= 2017 UEC European Track Championships – Men's team pursuit =

Men's team pursuit at the 2017 UEC European Track Championships
- UEC European Champion jersey
- Venue: Velodrom, Berlin
- Date: 18-19 October
- Competitors: 58 from 13 nations
- Winning time: 3:55.780

Medalists
gold medal	Louis Pijourlet; Corentin Ermenault; Florian Maitre; Benjamin Thomas; Thomas Denis	France
silver medal	Liam Bertazzo; Filippo Ganna; Francesco Lamon; Simone Consonni; Michele Scartezzini	Italy
bronze medal	Alexander Evtushenko; Mamyr Stash; Dmitri Sokolov; Aleksei Kurbatov; Sergey Shilov	Russia

The Men's team pursuit was held on 18 and 19 October 2017.

== Results ==
=== Qualifying ===
The fastest 8 teams qualify for the first round, from which the top 4 remain in contention for the gold medal final and the other 4 for the bronze medal final.

Rank	Name	Nation	Time	Notes
1	Thomas Denis; Corentin Ermenault; Florian Maitre; Benjamin Thomas	France	3:58.060	Q
2	Liam Bertazzo; Filippo Ganna; Francesco Lamon; Michele Scartezzini	Italy	3:58.720	Q
3	Alexander Evtushenko; Sergey Shilov; Dmitri Sokolov; Mamyr Stash	Russia	3:59.434	Q
4	Felix Groß; Theo Reinhardt; Kersten Thiele; Domenic Weinstein	Germany	3:59.730	Q
5	Julius Johansen; Niklas Larsen; Casper Pedersen; Casper von Folsach	Denmark	4:00.571	q
6	Claudio Imhof; Frank Pasche; Loïc Perizzolo; Cyrille Thièry	Switzerland	4:01.325	q
7	Alan Banaszek; Szymon Krawczyk; Szymon Sajnok; Daniel Staniszewski	Poland	4:01.709	q
8	Kenny De Ketele; Lindsay De Vylder; Gerben Thijssen; Sasha Weemaes	Belgium	4:02.954	q
9	Yauheni Karaliok; Siarhei Papok; Mikhail Shemetau; Raman Tsishkou	Belarus	4:05.780	
10	Volodymyr Dzhus; Roman Gladysh; Maksym Vasilyev; Illya Klepikov	Ukraine	4:08.056	
11	Vicente García de Mateos; Sebastián Mora; Albert Torres; Illart Zuazubiskar	Spain	4:09.542	
12	Alexandru Ciocan; Daniel Crista; Marius Petrache; Valentin Plesea	Romania	4:33.879	
	Steven Burke; Kian Emadi; Mark Stewart; Andy Tennant	Great Britain	DNF	

- Q = qualified; in contention for gold medal final
- q = qualified; in contention for bronze medal final

=== First round ===
First round heats are held as follows:
Heat 1: 6th v 7th qualifier
Heat 2: 5th v 8th qualifier
Heat 3: 2nd v 3rd qualifier
Heat 4: 1st v 4th qualifier

The winners of heats 3 and 4 proceed to the gold medal final. The remaining 6 teams are ranked on time, from which the top 2 proceed to the bronze medal final.

Rank	Heat	Name	Nation	Time	Notes
1	4	Thomas Denis; Corentin Ermenault; Florian Maitre; Benjamin Thomas	France	3:56.207	QG
2	3	Liam Bertazzo; Filippo Ganna; Francesco Lamon; Simone Consonni	Italy	3:56.917	QG
3	4	Felix Groß; Theo Reinhardt; Kersten Thiele; Domenic Weinstein	Germany	3:57.676	QB
4	3	Alexander Evtushenko; Mamyr Stash; Dmitri Sokolov; Aleksei Kurbatov	Russia	3:57.688	QB
5	2	Julius Johansen; Niklas Larsen; Casper Pedersen; Casper von Folsach	Denmark	3:57.693	
6	1	Alan Banaszek; Szymon Krawczyk; Szymon Sajnok; Bartosz Rudyk	Poland	3:58.523	
7	1	Claudio Imhof; Frank Pasche; Loïc Perizzolo; Cyrille Thièry	Switzerland	4:02.027	
8	2	Kenny De Ketele; Moreno De Pauw; Gerben Thijssen; Sasha Weemaes	Belgium	4:02.512	

- QG = qualified for gold medal final
- QB = qualified for bronze medal final

=== Finals ===
The final classification is determined in the medal finals.

Rank	Name	Nation	Time	Notes
Bronze medal final
3rd place, bronze medalist(s)	Alexander Evtushenko; Mamyr Stash; Dmitri Sokolov; Aleksei Kurbatov	Russia	3:57.517	
4	Felix Groß; Theo Reinhardt; Nils Schomber; Domenic Weinstein	Germany	3:58.435	
Gold medal final
1st place, gold medalist(s)	Louis Pijourlet; Corentin Ermenault; Florian Maitre; Benjamin Thomas	France	3:55.780	
2nd place, silver medalist(s)	Liam Bertazzo; Filippo Ganna; Francesco Lamon; Simone Consonni	Italy	3:55.986	
