= 2014 UEC European Track Championships – Men's team pursuit =

Men's team pursuit at the 2014 UEC European Track Championships
- UEC European Champion jersey
- Venue: Vélodrome Amédée Détraux, Baie-Mahault
- Date: 15-16 October
- Competitors: 57 from 13 nations

Medalists
| gold medal | Ed Clancy; Jon Dibben; Owain Doull; Andy Tennant | Great Britain |
| silver medal | Henning Bommel; Theo Reinhardt; Nils Schomber; Kersten Thiele; Leon Rohde | Germany |
| bronze medal | Alexey Kurbatov; Evgeny Kovalev; Ivan Kovalev; Alexander Serov; Artur Ershov | Russia |

The Men's team pursuit was held on 15–16 October 2014.

== Results ==
=== Qualifying ===
The fastest 8 teams qualify for the first round, from which the top 4 remain in contention for the gold medal final and the other 4 for the bronze medal final.

| Rank | Name | Nation | Time | Notes |
|---|---|---|---|---|
| 1 | Ed Clancy; Jon Dibben; Owain Doull; Andy Tennant | Great Britain | 4:12.022 | Q |
| 2 | Henning Bommel; Leon Rohde; Nils Schomber; Kersten Thiele | Germany | 4:13.975 | Q |
| 3 | Artur Ershov; Evgeny Kovalev; Ivan Kovalev; Alexander Serov | Russia | 4:14.856 | Q |
| 4 | Olivier Beer; Tom Bohli; Frank Pasche; Loïc Perizzolo | Switzerland | 4:15.607 | Q |
| 5 | Dion Beukeboom; Roy Eefting; Wim Stroetinga; Tim Veldt | Netherlands | 4:15.997 | q |
| 6 | Fabien Le Coguic; Julien Morice; Louis Pijourlet; Benjamin Thomas | France | 4:17.642 | q |
| 7 | Liam Bertazzo; Alex Buttazzoni; Marco Coledan; Elia Viviani | Italy | 4:19.030 | q |
| 8 | Roman Gladysh; Vitaliy Hryniv; Roman Shevchuk; Maksym Vasyliev | Ukraine | 4:19.305 | q |
| 9 | Andres Holm; Casper von Folsach; Casper Pedersen; Rasmus Quaade | Denmark | 4:20.601 | |
| 10 | Siarhei Papok; Raman Ramanau; Hardzei Tsishchanka; Raman Tsishkou | Belarus | 4:21.321 | |
| 11 | Sebastián Mora; David Muntaner; Eloy Teruel; Albert Torres | Spain | 4:21.444 | |
| 12 | Dominique Cornu; Kenny De Ketele; Moreno De Pauw; Otto Vergaerde | Belgium | 4:22.757 | |
| 13 | Cormac Clarke; Martyn Irvine; Ryan Mullen; Javan Nulty | Ireland | DNF | |

- Q = qualified; in contention for gold medal final
- q = qualified; in contention for bronze medal final

=== First round ===
First round heats are held as follows:
Heat 1: 6th v 7th qualifier
Heat 2: 5th v 8th qualifier
Heat 3: 2nd v 3rd qualifier
Heat 4: 1st v 4th qualifier

The winners of heats 3 and 4 proceed to the gold medal final. The remaining 6 teams are ranked on time, then proceed to the finals for bronze, 5th or 7th place.

| Rank | Heat | Name | Nation | Time | Notes |
|---|---|---|---|---|---|
| 1 | 3 | Henning Bommel; Leon Rohde; Nils Schomber; Kersten Thiele | Germany | 4:16.476 | QG |
| 2 | 4 | Ed Clancy; Jon Dibben; Owain Doull; Andy Tennant | Great Britain | 4:18.246 | QG |
| 3 | 3 | Artur Ershov; Evgeny Kovalev; Ivan Kovalev; Alexander Serov | Russia | 4:18.703 | QB |
| 4 | 1 | Fabien Le Coguic; Julien Morice; Louis Pijourlet; Benjamin Thomas | France | 4:21.772 | QB |
| 5 | 4 | Olivier Beer; Théry Schir; Frank Pasche; Loïc Perizzolo | Switzerland | 4:22.432 | Q5 |
| 6 | 1 | Liam Bertazzo; Alex Buttazzoni; Marco Coledan; Elia Viviani | Italy | 4:24.007 | Q5 |
| 7 | 2 | Roman Gladysh; Vitaliy Hryniv; Vladyslav Kreminskyi; Maksym Vasyliev | Ukraine | 4:24.825 | Q7 |
| 8 | 2 | Dion Beukeboom; Roy Eefting; Wim Stroetinga; Tim Veldt | Netherlands | 4:25.656 | Q7 |

- QG = qualified for gold medal final
- QB = qualified for bronze medal final
- Q5 = qualified for 5th place final
- Q7 = qualified for 7th place final

=== Finals ===
The final classification is determined in the ranking finals.

| Rank | Name | Nation | Time | Notes |
|---|---|---|---|---|
Final for 7th place
| 7 | Dion Beukeboom; Roy Eefting; Wim Stroetinga; Tim Veldt | Netherlands | 4:16.311 | |
| 8 | Roman Gladysh; Vitaliy Hryniv; Volodymyr Dzhus; Maksym Vasyliev | Ukraine | 4:18.711 | |
Final for 5th place
| 5 | Olivier Beer; Théry Schir; Frank Pasche; Tom Bohli | Switzerland | 4:12.926 | |
| 6 | Liam Bertazzo; Alex Buttazzoni; Marco Coledan; Elia Viviani | Italy | 4:17.497 | |
Bronze medal final
| 3rd place, bronze medalist(s) | Alexey Kurbatov; Evgeny Kovalev; Ivan Kovalev; Alexander Serov | Russia | 4:13.318 | |
| 4 | Fabien Le Coguic; Julien Morice; Louis Pijourlet; Benjamin Thomas | France | 4:16.940 | |
Gold medal final
| 1st place, gold medalist(s) | Ed Clancy; Jon Dibben; Owain Doull; Andy Tennant | Great Britain | 4:11.545 | |
| 2nd place, silver medalist(s) | Henning Bommel; Theo Reinhardt; Nils Schomber; Kersten Thiele | Germany | 4:12.342 | |
