= 2013 UEC European Track Championships – Men's team pursuit =

Men's team pursuit at the 2013 UEC European Track Championships
- UEC European Champion jersey
- Venue: Omnisport Apeldoorn, Apeldoorn
- Date: 18 October
- Competitors: 57 from 14 nations
- Winning time: 4:02.258

Medalists
gold medal	Owain Doull; Steven Burke; Ed Clancy; Andy Tennant; Sam Harrison	Great Britain
silver medal	Artur Ershov; Ivan Kovalev; Evgeny Kovalev; Alexander Serov	Russia
bronze medal	Tim Veldt; Dion Beukeboom; Roy Eefting; Jenning Huizenga	Netherlands

The Men's team pursuit at the 2013 UEC European Track Championships was held on 18 October 2013. 14 nations participated.

== Results ==
=== Qualifying ===
The fastest two teams progressed to the gold medal final; the following two progressed to the bronze medal final.

Rank	Name	Nation	Time	Notes
1/2	Owain Doull; Steven Burke; Ed Clancy; Sam Harrison	Great Britain	?	Q
1/2	Artur Ershov; Ivan Kovalev; Evgeny Kovalev; Alexander Serov	Russia	?	Q
3/4	Tim Veldt; Dion Beukeboom; Roy Eefting; Jenning Huizenga	Netherlands	?	q
3/4	Sebastián Mora; David Muntaner; Eloy Teruel; Albert Torres	Spain	?	q
5	Liam Bertazzo; Marco Coledan; Paolo Simion; Elia Viviani	Italy	4:07.614	
6	Jasper De Buyst; Kenny De Ketele; Moreno De Pauw; Gijs Van Hoecke	Belgium	4:07.952	
7	Olivier Beer; Loïc Perizzolo; Tom Bohli; Kilian Moser	Switzerland	4:10.584	
8	Casper von Folsach; Anders Holm; Mathias Krigbaum; Mathias Møller Nielsen	Denmark	4:11.057	
9	Vladimir Dzhus; Illya Klepikov; Oleksandr Lobov; Vitaly Popkov	Ukraine	4:11.497	
10	Raman Tsishkou; Aleh Ahiyevich; Siarhei Papok; Branislau Samoilau	Belarus	4:11.793	
11	Julien Duval; Damien Gaudin; Julien Morice; Sébastien Turgot	France	4:12.046	
12	Adrian Tekliński; Rafał Jeziorski; Mateusz Nowaczek; Mateusz Nowak	Poland	4:13.669	
13	Maximilian Beyer; Henning Bommel; Theo Reinhardt; Kersten Thiele	Germany	4:13.755	
14	Roman Fürst; Jan Kraus; František Sisr; Ondřej Vendolský	Czech Republic	4:14.276	

=== Finals ===
Final rankings were determined in the medal races.

Rank	Name	Nation	Time	Notes
1st place, gold medalist(s)	Owain Doull; Steven Burke; Ed Clancy; Andy Tennant	Great Britain	4:02.258	
2nd place, silver medalist(s)	Artur Ershov; Ivan Kovalev; Evgeny Kovalev; Alexander Serov	Russia	4:02.460	
3rd place, bronze medalist(s)	Tim Veldt; Dion Beukeboom; Roy Eefting; Jenning Huizenga	Netherlands	4:04.998	
4	Sebastián Mora; David Muntaner; Eloy Teruel; Albert Torres	Spain	4:05.605	
