= 2018 UEC European Track Championships – Men's team pursuit =

Men's team pursuit at the 2018 UEC European Track Championships
- Venue: Sir Chris Hoy Velodrome, Glasgow
- Date: 2–3 August
- Competitors: 53 from 12 nations
- Winning time: 3:55.401

Medalists
gold medal	Elia Viviani; Michele Scartezzini; Filippo Ganna; Francesco Lamon; Liam Bertazzo	Italy
silver medal	Cyrille Thièry; Frank Pasche; Stefan Bissegger; Théry Schir; Claudio Imhof	Switzerland
bronze medal	Ethan Hayter; Kian Emadi; Charlie Tanfield; Steven Burke; Oliver Wood	Great Britain

The men's team pursuit competition at the 2018 UEC European Track Championships was held on 2 and 3 August 2018.

== Results ==
=== Qualifying ===
The eight fastest teams advanced to the first round.

Rank	Name	Nation	Time	Behind	Notes
1	Elia Viviani; Liam Bertazzo; Filippo Ganna; Francesco Lamon	Italy	3:56.559		Q
2	Claudio Imhof; Cyrille Thièry; Stefan Bissegger; Frank Pasche	Switzerland	3:57.925	+1.366	Q
3	Benjamin Thomas; Adrien Garel; Corentin Ermenault; Louis Pijourlet	France	3:58.254	+1.695	Q
4	Ethan Hayter; Oliver Wood; Steven Burke; Kian Emadi	Great Britain	3:58.529	+1.970	Q
5	Alexander Evtushenko; Lev Gonov; Ivan Smirnov; Gleb Syritsa	Russia	3:58.746	+2.187	q
6	Theo Reinhardt; Leon Rohde; Nils Schomber; Domenic Weinstein	Germany	3:59.627	+3.068	q
7	Robbe Ghys; Kenny De Ketele; Lindsay De Vylder; Sasha Weemaes	Belgium	4:00.022	+3.463	q
8	Szymon Sajnok; Szymon Krawczyk; Dawid Czubak; Adrian Tekliński	Poland	4:01.261	+4.702	q
9	Raman Tsishkou; Yauheni Akhramenka; Yauheni Karaliok; Mikhail Shemetau	Belarus	4:03.582	+7.023	
10	Casper von Folsach; Matias Malmberg; Oliver Frederiksen; Rasmus Pedersen	Denmark	4:06.124	+9.565	
11	Volodymyr Dzhus; Ilya Klepikov; Timur Maleev; Maksym Vasilyev	Ukraine	4:07.001	+10.442	
12	Julio Amores; Joan Bennàssar; Marc Buades; Illart Zuazubiskar	Spain	4:15.166	+18.607	

=== First round ===
First round heats were held as follows:
Heat 1: 6th v 7th fastest
Heat 2: 5th v 8th fastest
Heat 3: 2nd v 3rd fastest
Heat 4: 1st v 4th fastest

The winners of heats 3 and 4 proceeded to the gold medal race. The remaining six teams were ranked on time, from which the top two proceeded to the bronze medal race.

Rank	Heat	Name	Nation	Time	Notes
1	4	Elia Viviani; Liam Bertazzo; Filippo Ganna; Francesco Lamon	Italy	3:54.778	QG
2	3	Claudio Imhof; Cyrille Thièry; Stefan Bissegger; Frank Pasche	Switzerland	3:56.452	QG
3	4	Ethan Hayter; Steven Burke; Kian Emadi; Charlie Tanfield	Great Britain	3:56.007	QB
4	1	Theo Reinhardt; Leon Rohde; Nils Schomber; Domenic Weinstein	Germany	3:56.852	QB
5	2	Szymon Sajnok; Szymon Krawczyk; Dawid Czubak; Bartosz Rudyk	Poland	3:58.781	
6	2	Alexander Evtushenko; Lev Gonov; Ivan Smirnov; Gleb Syritsa	Russia	3:59.095	
7	1	Robbe Ghys; Kenny De Ketele; Lindsay De Vylder; Sasha Weemaes	Belgium	3:59.519	
8	3	Benjamin Thomas; Adrien Garel; Aurélien Costeplane; Corentin Ermenault	France	4:08.283	

- QG = qualified for gold medal final
- QB = qualified for bronze medal final

=== Finals ===
Rank	Name	Nation	Time	Behind	Notes
Gold medal final
1st place, gold medalist(s)	Elia Viviani; Michele Scartezzini; Filippo Ganna; Francesco Lamon	Italy	3:55.401		
2nd place, silver medalist(s)	Cyrille Thièry; Frank Pasche; Stefan Bissegger; Théry Schir	Switzerland	3:59.705	+4.304	
Bronze medal final
3rd place, bronze medalist(s)	Ethan Hayter; Kian Emadi; Charlie Tanfield; Steven Burke	Great Britain	3:57.463		
4	Theo Reinhardt; Leon Rohde; Domenic Weinstein; Nils Schomber	Germany	4:00.007	+2.544	
