= 2018 UEC European Track Championships – Men's individual pursuit =

Men's individual pursuit at the 2018 UEC European Track Championships
- Venue: Sir Chris Hoy Velodrome, Glasgow
- Date: 5 August
- Competitors: 23 from 14 nations
- Winning time: 4:13.363

Medalists
gold medal	Domenic Weinstein	Germany
silver medal	Ivo Oliveira	Portugal
bronze medal	Claudio Imhof	Switzerland

The men's individual pursuit competition at the 2018 UEC European Track Championships was held on 5 August 2018.

== Results ==
=== Qualifying ===
The first two racers race for gold, the third and fourth fastest rider race for the bronze medal.

Rank	Name	Nation	Time	Behind	Notes
1	Domenic Weinstein	Germany	4:13.073		QG
2	Ivo Oliveira	Portugal	4:13.600	+0.527	QG
3	Alexander Evtushenko	Russia	4:16.028	+2.955	QB
4	Claudio Imhof	Switzerland	4:16.658	+3.585	QB
5	John Archibald	Great Britain	4:17.119	+4.046	
6	Filippo Ganna	Italy	4:17.260	+4.187	
7	Corentin Ermenault	France	4:17.636	+4.563	
8	Leon Rohde	Germany	4:17.878	+4.805	
9	Stefan Bissegger	Switzerland	4:21.059	+7.986	
10	Charlie Tanfield	Great Britain	4:21.837	+8.764	
11	Dawid Czubak	Poland	4:24.906	+11.833	
12	Louis Pijourlet	France	4:24.941	+11.868	
13	Bartosz Rudyk	Poland	4:26.115	+13.042	
14	Yauheni Akhramenka	Belarus	4:27.215	+14.142	
15	Nicolas Pietrula	Czech Republic	4:27.475	+14.402	
16	Mikhail Shemetau	Belarus	4:27.575	+14.502	
17	Marco Coledan	Italy	4:28.444	+15.371	
18	Volodymyr Dzhus	Ukraine	4:28.645	+15.572	
19	Timur Maleev	Ukraine	4:30.755	+17.682	
20	Joan Bennàssar	Spain	4:31.921	+18.848	
21	Illart Zuazubiskar	Spain	4:37.420	+24.347	
22	Sasha Weemaes	Belgium	4:40.059	+26.986	
23	Vitālijs Korņilovs	Latvia	4:51.903	+38.830	

- QG = qualified for gold medal final
- QB = qualified for bronze medal final

=== Finals ===
Rank	Name	Nation	Time	Behind	Notes
Gold medal final
1st place, gold medalist(s)	Domenic Weinstein	Germany	4:13.363		
2nd place, silver medalist(s)	Ivo Oliveira	Portugal	4:15.304	+1.941	
Bronze medal final
3rd place, bronze medalist(s)	Claudio Imhof	Switzerland	4:16.654		
4	Alexander Evtushenko	Russia	4:17.608	+0.954	
