= 2014 UEC European Track Championships – Men's points race =

Men's points race at the 2014 UEC European Track Championships
- UEC European Champion jersey
- Venue: Vélodrome Amédée Détraux, Baie-Mahault
- Date: 17 October
- Competitors: 29 from 15 nations

Medalists
gold medal	Benjamin Thomas	France
silver medal	Liam Bertazzo	Italy
bronze medal	Henning Bommel	Germany

The Men's points race was held on 17 October 2014. 29 riders participated over a distance of 40 km (120 laps), with sprints every 6 laps awarding 5, 3, 2 or 1 point to the first four; 20 points are also awarded/withdrawn for each lap gained/lost respectively.

== Results ==
Rank	Name	Nation	Sprint points	Lap points	Finish order	Total points
1st place, gold medalist(s)	Benjamin Thomas	France	37	0	7	37
2nd place, silver medalist(s)	Liam Bertazzo	Italy	30	0	5	30
3rd place, bronze medalist(s)	Henning Bommel	Germany	24	0	19	24
4	Otto Vergaerde	Belgium	17	0	1	17
5	Raman Ramanau	Belarus	14	0	2	14
6	Théry Schir	Switzerland	13	0	4	13
7	Morgan Kneisky	France	11	0	20	11
8	Theo Reinhardt	Germany	9	0	10	9
9	Casper von Folsach	Denmark	8	0	9	8
10	Marco Coledan	Italy	8	0	21	8
11	Andreas Graf	Austria	7	0	8	7
12	Eloy Teruel	Spain	7	0	13	7
13	Mark Christian	Great Britain	6	0	14	6
14	Wim Stroetinga	Netherlands	5	0	12	5
15	Roman Gladysh	Ukraine	4	0	3	4
16	Vitaliy Hryniv	Ukraine	4	0	16	4
17	Andreas Müller	Austria	4	0	18	4
18	Sebastián Mora	Spain	1	0	15	1
19	Ivan Kovalev	Russia	1	0	17	1
20	Daniel Hartvig	Denmark	0	0	6	0
21	Moreno De Pauw	Belgium	0	0	22	0
22	Hardzei Tsishchanka	Belarus	1	-20	11	-19
—	Thomas Fallon	Ireland	0	0	—	DNF
—	Aleksander Grigorev	Russia	2	0	—	DNF
—	Loïc Perizzolo	Switzerland	1	0	—	DNF
—	Cormac Clarke	Ireland	0	0	—	DNF
—	Theo Bos	Netherlands	0	0	—	DNF
—	Mateusz Nowak	Poland	1	0	—	DNF
—	Owain Doull	Great Britain	—	—	—	DSQ^{[A]}

- ^{^{A}}Owain Doull was disqualified for providing illegal assistance to Mark Christian.
