= 2015 UEC European Track Championships – Men's individual pursuit =

Men's individual pursuit at the 2015 UEC European Track Championships
- UEC European Champion jersey
- Venue: Velodrome Suisse, Grenchen
- Date: 17 October
- Competitors: 32 from 18 nations

Medalists
gold medal	Stefan Küng	Switzerland
silver medal	Domenic Weinstein	Germany
bronze medal	Dion Beukeboom	Netherlands

The Men's individual pursuit was held on 17 October 2015.

== Results ==
=== Qualifying ===
The fastest 4 competitors qualify for the medal finals.

Rank	Name	Nation	Time	Notes
1	Stefan Küng	Switzerland	4:15.678	QG
2	Domenic Weinstein	Germany	4:17.861	QG
3	Dion Beukeboom	Netherlands	4:19.562	QB
4	Julien Morice	France	4:21.696	QB
5	Andy Tennant	Great Britain	4:22.567	
6	Kirill Sveshnikov	Russia	4:22.803	
7	Silvan Dillier	Switzerland	4:23.575	
8	Dmitry Sokolov	Russia	4:23.830	
9	Mikhail Shemetau	Belarus	4:24.303	
10	Martyn Irvine	Ireland	4:24.737	
11	Vicente García de Mateos	Spain	4:25.802	
12	Jonathan Dufrasne	Belgium	4:26.245	
13	Filippo Ganna	Italy	4:27.027	
14	Nils Schomber	Germany	4:27.136	
15	Ivo Oliveira	Portugal	4:27.333	
16	Gijs Van Hoecke	Belgium	4:28.138	
17	Matthew Gibson	Great Britain	4:28.139	
18	Sebastián Mora	Spain	4:28.231	
19	Casper Pedersen	Denmark	4:28.620	
20	Michele Scartezzini	Italy	4:28.701	
21	Volodymyr Diuia	Ukraine	4:30.318	
22	Roy Eefting	Netherlands	4:30.500	
23	Damien Gaudin	France	4:30.508	
24	Daniel Hartvig	Denmark	4:31.522	
25	Recep Ünalan	Turkey	4:32.496	
26	Yauheni Karaliok	Belarus	4:32.619	
27	Roman Fürst	Czech Republic	4:34.150	
28	Nicolas Pietrula	Czech Republic	4:34.373	
29	Krisztián Lovassy	Hungary	4:34.483	
30	Marc Potts	Ireland	4:36.754	
31	Vitaliy Hryniv	Ukraine	4:38.584	
32	Mika Simola	Finland	4:41.077	

- QG = qualified for gold medal final
- QB = qualified for bronze medal final

=== Finals ===
The final classification is determined in the medal finals.

Rank	Name	Nation	Time	Notes
Bronze medal final
3rd place, bronze medalist(s)	Dion Beukeboom	Netherlands	4:21.669	
4	Julien Morice	France	4:22.140	
Gold medal final
1st place, gold medalist(s)	Stefan Küng	Switzerland	4:14.992	
2nd place, silver medalist(s)	Domenic Weinstein	Germany	4:17.775	
