= 2019 UEC European Track Championships – Men's individual pursuit =

Men's individual pursuit at the 2019 UEC European Track Championships
- Venue: Omnisport Apeldoorn, Apeldoorn
- Date: 19 October
- Competitors: 20 from 13 nations
- Winning time: 4:14.358

Medalists
gold medal	Corentin Ermenault	France
silver medal	Domenic Weinstein	Germany
bronze medal	Felix Groß	Germany

The men's individual pursuit competition at the 2019 UEC European Track Championships was held on 19 October 2019.

== Results ==
=== Qualifying ===
The first two racers raced for gold, the third and fourth fastest rider raced for the bronze medal.

Rank	Name	Nation	Time	Behind	Notes
1	Corentin Ermenault	France	4:10.314		QG
2	Domenic Weinstein	Germany	4:12.125	+1.811	QG
3	Stefan Bissegger	Switzerland	4:13.242	+2.928	QB
4	Felix Groß	Germany	4:14.617	+4.303	QB
5	Mikhail Shemetau	Belarus	4:17.144	+6.830	
6	Rune Herregodts	Belgium	4:17.599	+7.285	
7	Alexander Evtushenko	Russia	4:18.129	+7.815	
8	Davide Plebani	Italy	4:18.208	+7.894	
9	Szymon Krawczyk	Poland	4:18.626	+8.312	
10	Jonathan Milan	Italy	4:18.694	+8.380	
11	Valère Thiébaud	Switzerland	4:19.202	+8.888	
12	Xeno Young	Ireland	4:20.528	+10.214	
13	Wojciech Ziółkowski	Poland	4:23.448	+13.134	
14	Yauheni Akhramenka	Belarus	4:25.180	+14.866	
15	Louis Pijourlet	France	4:25.282	+14.968	
16	Iúri Leitão	Portugal	4:26.565	+16.251	
17	Viktor Filutás	Hungary	4:26.645	+16.331	
18	Kyrylo Tsarenko	Ukraine	4:32.767	+22.453	
19	Oleksander Kryvych	Ukraine	4:42.428	+32.114	
20	Vitālijs Korņilovs	Latvia	4:42.455	+32.141	

=== Finals ===
Rank	Name	Nation	Time	Behind	Notes
Gold medal final
1	Corentin Ermenault	France	4:14.358		
2	Domenic Weinstein	Germany	4:15.918	+1.560	
Bronze medal final
3	Felix Groß	Germany	4:13.240		
4	Stefan Bissegger	Switzerland	4:13.776	+0.536	
