= 2014 UEC European Track Championships =

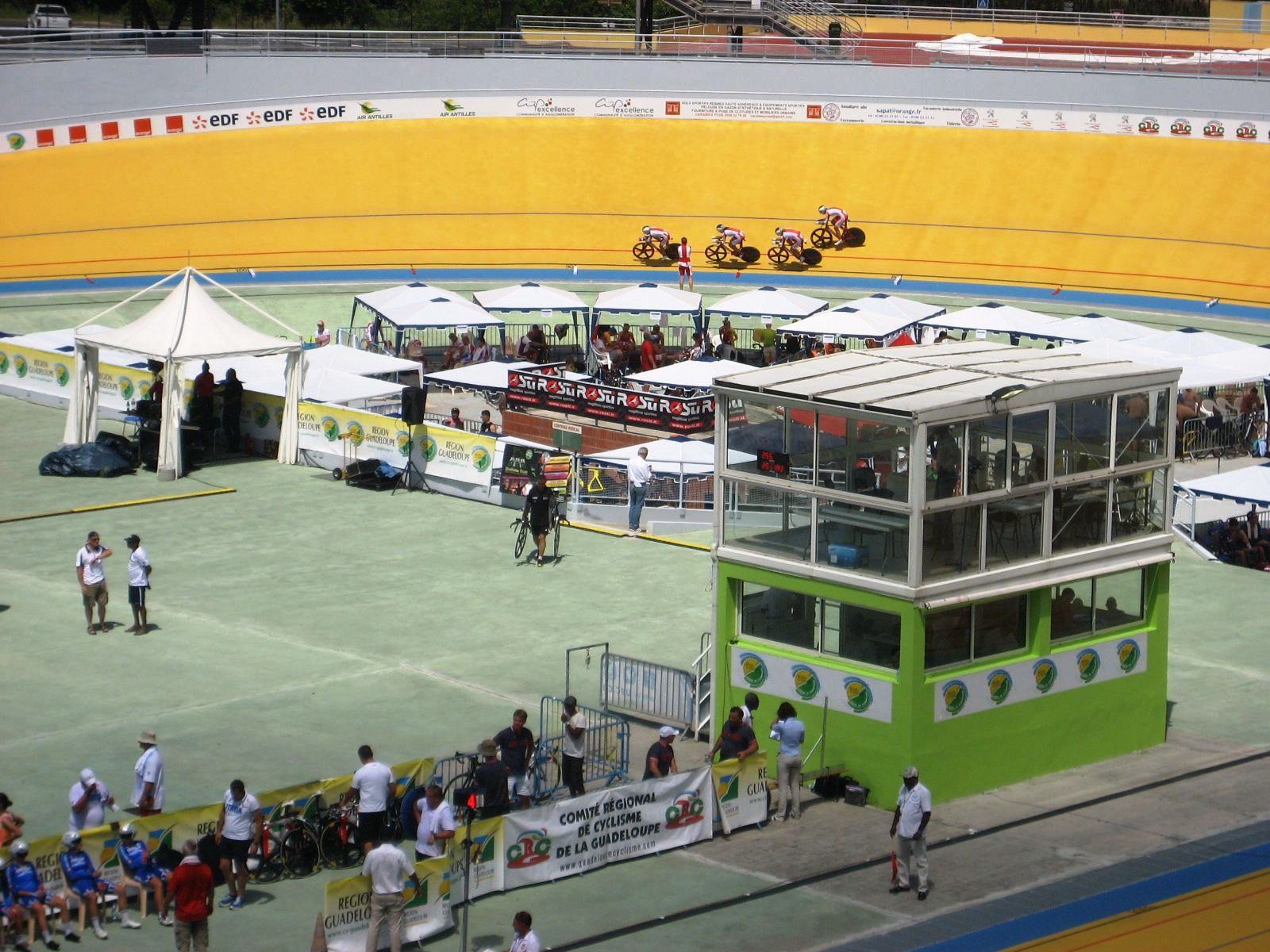
- Venue: Baie-Mahault, Guadeloupe, France
- Date(s): 16–19 October 2014
- Velodrome: Vélodrome Amédée Détraux
- Nations participating: 23
- Cyclists participating: 219 (93 women, 125 men)
- Events: 19 (9 women, 10 men)

The 2014 UEC European Track Championships was the fifth edition of the elite UEC European Track Championships in track cycling and took place at the Vélodrome Amédée Détraux in Baie-Mahault, Guadeloupe, France, between 16 and 19 October. The Event was organised by the European Cycling Union. All European champions are awarded the UEC European Champion jersey which may be worn by the champion throughout the year when competing in the same event at other competitions.

The programme for the 2014 championships was considerably extended, and all World Championship track events were held; ten Olympic events, (sprint, team sprint, keirin, team pursuit and omnium, for both men and women), for which qualification points for the 2016 Summer Olympics were available for the first time, and nine non-Olympic events; the men's madison race and points races, scratch races, sprint time trials (1000 metres for men, 500 metres for women) and individual pursuits for both genders were held as part of the championships. The omnium was held in its new format for the first time, ending with the points race, rather than the sprint time trial.

Unusually, the event was held on a fully outdoor concrete track with a 333-metre circumference, as opposed to the now standard 250 metre indoor wooden velodromes normally used in such events. As a result, several of the events (team sprints, omniums and points races) will be held over non-standard distances.

In addition, the event took place outside continental Europe for the first time, being held in the French caribbean province department of Guadeloupe.

== Summary ==
Great Britain topped the medal table with six golds, including a clean sweep of team and individual pursuit titles. Germany won the most medals, with thirteen including a fifth successive men's team sprint title, while Russia were second on golds, with four, and medals with eleven. There was a first ever medal for Austria, gold in the men's madison.

The most successful individual was Russia's Anastasiia Voinova with three gold medals.

The redesigned omnium event, where all points won in the first five events go forward into the final points race, was held in its new format for the first time. Despite the change, Laura Trott of Great Britain defended her title in the women's edition to retain her claim as most successful cyclist in the history of the event with six golds. 2013 points race winner, Elia Viviani of Italy won the men's event, having entered the final points race already with a clear lead. Katie Archibald became the first winner of the women's individual pursuit at the championships. In doing so she ended British team-mate Joanna Rowsell's monopoly on all available major international team and individual pursuit titles.

Ed Clancy's team pursuit gold made him the most successful male rider in the events history with five gold medals and one bronze medal in total. Grégory Baugé's sprint gold was his first, and was won on home soil, as Bauge was born in Guadeloupe.

Events were delayed on a number of occasions by rain on the outdoor track, and times in the timed events were, as expected, significantly slower than usual.

== Participating nations ==
218 cyclists (93 women, 125 men) from 23 nations participated at the championships. The number of cyclists per nation is shown in parentheses.

- Austria (2)
- Azerbaijan (4)
- Belarus (details) (14)
- Belgium (10)
- Czech Republic (6)
- Denmark (6)
- Finland (3)
- France (19) (host)
- Germany (17)
- Greece (5)
- Great Britain (details) (15)
- Hungary (1)
- Ireland (11)
- Italy (12)
- Lithuania (9)
- Netherlands (details) (11)
- Poland (14)
- Russia (22)
- Slovenia (1)
- Switzerland (7)
- Spain (15)
- Turkey (1)
- Ukraine (13)

== Events ==
Event	Gold		Silver		Bronze	
Men's Events
Sprint	Grégory Baugé; France		Damian Zieliński; Poland		Robert Förstemann; Germany	
Team sprint ^{§}	Germany; Robert Förstemann; Tobias Wächter; Joachim Eilers	59.602	France; Grégory Baugé; Kévin Sireau; Michaël D'Almeida	59.820	Russia; Pavel Yakushevskiy; Denis Dmitriev; Nikita Shurshin	1:00.061
Keirin	Joachim Eilers; Germany		Matthijs Büchli; Netherlands		Denis Dmitriev; Russia	
1 km time trial	Callum Skinner; Great Britain	1:02.399	Joachim Eilers; Germany	1:02.474	Quentin Lafargue; France	1:02.734
Omnium	Elia Viviani; Italy	219 pts	Jon Dibben; Great Britain	198 pts	Unai Elorriaga; Spain	179 pts
Team pursuit	Great Britain; Ed Clancy; Andy Tennant; Owain Doull; Jon Dibben	4:11.545	Germany; Henning Bommel; Theo Reinhardt; Nils Schomber; Kersten Thiele; Leon Rohde	4:12.342	Russia; Alexey Kurbatov; Evgeny Kovalev; Ivan Kovalev; Alexander Serov; Artur Ershov	4:13.318
Individual pursuit	Andy Tennant; Great Britain	4:32.686	Alexander Evtushenko; Russia	4:34.954	Kersten Thiele; Germany	4:32.878
Points race	Benjamin Thomas; France	37 pts	Liam Bertazzo; Italy	30 pts	Henning Bommel; Germany	24 pts
Scratch race	Otto Vergaerde; Belgium		Eloy Teruel; Spain		Ed Clancy; Great Britain	1 lap down
Madison	Austria; Andreas Graf; Andreas Müller	6 pts	Belgium; Otto Vergaerde; Kenny De Ketele	21 pts (1 lap down)	France; Vivien Brisse; Morgan Kneisky	18 pts (1 lap down)
Women's Events
Sprint	Anastasiia Voinova; Russia		Tania Calvo; Spain		Kristina Vogel; Germany	
Team sprint ^{§}	Russia; Elena Brezhniva; Anastasiia Voinova; Daria Shmeleva	44.341	Germany; Miriam Welte; Kristina Vogel	44.623	Netherlands; Elis Ligtlee; Shanne Braspennincx	45.302
Keirin	Kristina Vogel; Germany		Elena Brezhniva; Russia		Shanne Braspennincx; Netherlands	
500 m time trial	Anastasiia Voinova; Russia	34.242	Elis Ligtlee; Netherlands	34.776	Miriam Welte; Germany	34.842
Omnium	Laura Trott; Great Britain	199 pts	Jolien D'Hoore; Belgium	198 pts	Anna Knauer; Germany	167 pts
Team pursuit	Great Britain; Katie Archibald; Elinor Barker; Ciara Horne; Laura Trott; Joanna Rowsell	4:38.391	Russia; Tamara Balabolina; Irina Molicheva; Aleksandra Goncharova; Evgenia Romanyuta; Alexandra Chekina	4:45.364	Italy; Simona Frapporti; Beatrice Bartelloni; Tatiana Guderzo; Silvia Valsecchi; Maria Giulia Confalonieri	4:42.018
Individual pursuit	Katie Archibald; Great Britain	3:40.136	Mieke Kröger; Germany	3:42.153	Vilija Sereikaitė; Lithuania	3:45.811
Scratch race	Evgenia Romanyuta; Russia		Laurie Berthon; France		Elena Cecchini; Italy	
Points race	Eugenia Bujak; Poland	21 pts	Kelly Druyts; Belgium	14 pts	Elena Cecchini; Italy	14 pts

§ = raced over non-standard distance (men=1000 metres, women=660 metres)

- shaded events are non-Olympic
- riders named in italics did not contest the corresponding finals

== Medal table ==
Rank	Nation	Gold	Silver	Bronze	Total
1	GBR	6	1	1	8
2	RUS	4	3	3	10
3	GER	3	4	6	13
4	FRA	2	2	2	6
5	BEL	1	3	0	4
6	ITA	1	1	3	5
7	POL	1	1	0	2
8	AUT	1	0	0	1
9	NED	0	2	2	4
10	SPA	0	2	1	3
11	LTU	0	0	1	1
Totals (11 entries)		19	19	19	57
