= 2018 UCI Track Cycling World Championships – Men's madison =

Men's madison at the 2018 UCI Track Cycling World Championships
- Venue: Omnisport Apeldoorn
- Location: Apeldoorn, Netherlands
- Dates: 4 March
- Competitors: 32 from 16 nations
- Teams: 16
- Winning points: 53

Medalists
gold medal	Roger Kluge; Theo Reinhardt	Germany
silver medal	Albert Torres; Sebastián Mora	Spain
bronze medal	Cameron Meyer; Callum Scotson	Australia

The men's madison competition at the 2018 UCI Track Cycling World Championships was held on 4 March 2018 at the Omnisport Apeldoorn in Apeldoorn, Netherlands.

== Results ==
200 laps (50km) with 20 sprints were raced.

Rank	Name	Nation	Laps points	Sprint points	Total points
1st place, gold medalist(s)	Roger Kluge; Theo Reinhardt	Germany	20	33	53
2nd place, silver medalist(s)	Albert Torres; Sebastián Mora	Spain	20	25	45
3rd place, bronze medalist(s)	Cameron Meyer; Callum Scotson	Australia	20	17	37
4	Oliver Wood; Mark Stewart	Great Britain	0	36	36
5	Andreas Graf; Andreas Müller	Austria	20	12	32
6	Niklas Larsen; Casper von Folsach	Denmark	0	29	29
7	Benjamin Thomas; Morgan Kneisky	France	0	24	24
8	Kenny De Ketele; Moreno De Pauw	Belgium	0	23	23
9	Felix English; Mark Downey	Ireland	0	11	11
10	Simone Consonni; Liam Bertazzo	Italy	0	10	10
11	Roy Pieters; Wim Stroetinga	Netherlands	0	1	1
12	Tristan Marguet; Gaël Suter	Switzerland	–20	2	–18
13	Wojciech Pszczolarski; Daniel Staniszewski	Poland	–40	3	–37
	Regan Gough; Thomas Sexton	New Zealand	0	0	DNF
	Daniel Holloway; Adrian Hegyvary	United States	–60	5	DNF
	Leung Chun Wing; Cheung King Lok	Hong Kong	–60	0	DNF
