= Rad-Net Oßwald =

German cycling team

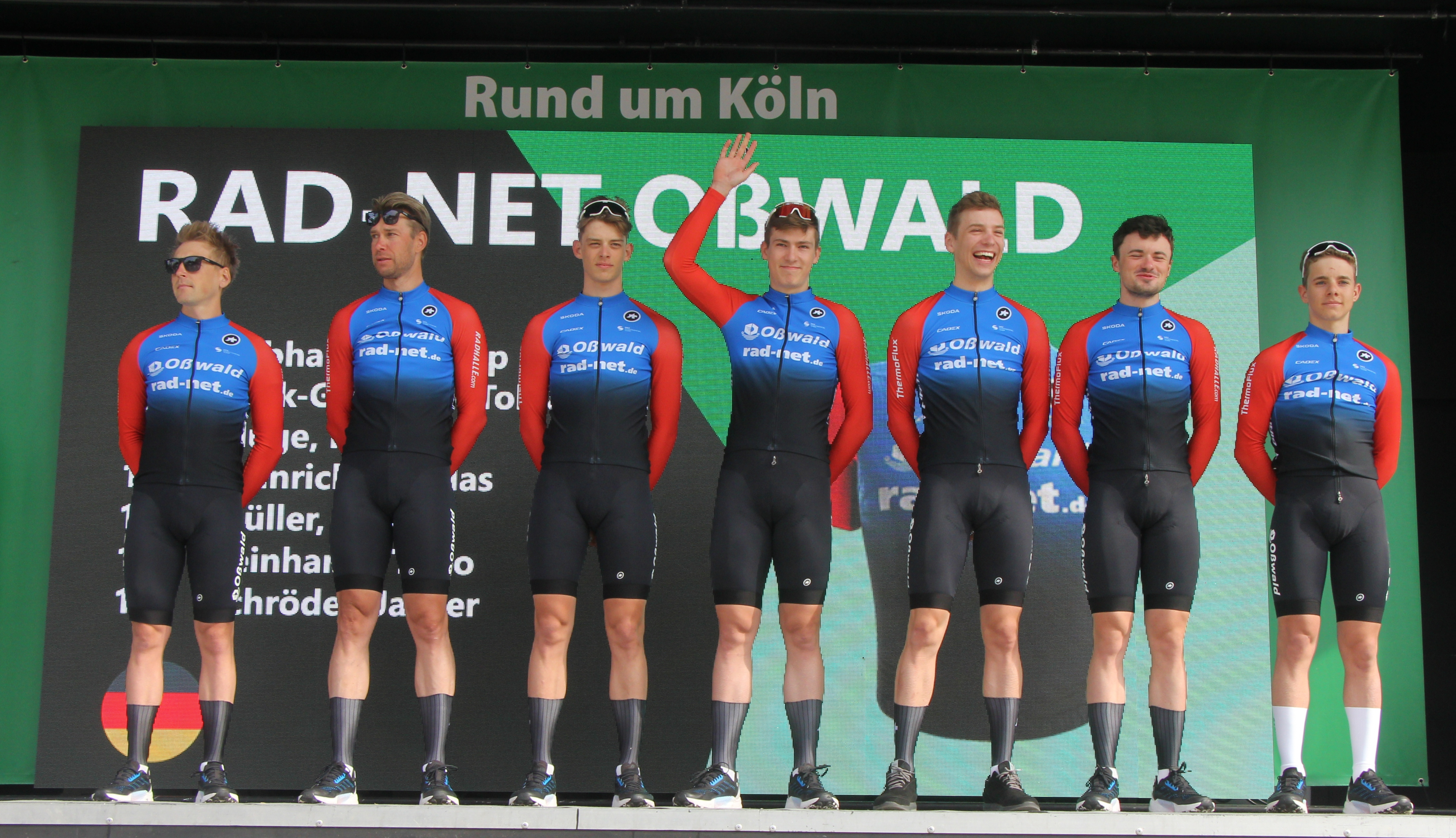
- The team in 2023

Team information
- UCI code: RNR (2013–2017, 2020–2022); HRN (2018–2019); RNO (2023–)
- Registered: Germany
- Founded: 2013
- Discipline: Road
- Status: Continental
- Bicycles: ROSE
- Website: Team home page

Key personnel
- Team managers: Ralf Grabsch; Frank Augustin; Arne Egner; Lucas Liss; Sven Meyer; Alexander Theis

Team name history
- 2013–2017 2018–2019 2020–2022 2023–: Rad-Net Rose Team (RNR); Heizomat–Rad-Net.de (HRN); Rad-Net Rose Team (RNR); Rad-Net Oßwald (RNO)
Jersey

Rad-Net Oßwald is a German UCI Continental team founded in 2013. It participates in UCI Continental Circuits races.

== Team roster ==
As of 22 February 2021.

Rider	Date of birth
Pirmin Benz (GER)	26 November 2000 (age 25)
Tobias Buck-Gramcko (GER)	1 January 2001 (age 25)
Laurin Drescher (GER)	6 February 2002 (age 24)
Jakob Geßner (GER)	1 February 2000 (age 26)
Felix Groß (GER)	4 September 1998 (age 28)
Nicolas Heinrich (GER)	2 December 2001 (age 24)
Moritz Kretschy (GER)	12 May 2002 (age 24)
Moritz Malcharek (GER)	29 July 1997 (age 29)

Rider	Date of birth
Henrik Pakalski (GER)	7 May 1999 (age 27)
Jannis Peter (GER)	30 October 2000 (age 25)
Theo Reinhardt (GER)	17 September 1990 (age 35)
Leon Rohde (GER)	10 May 1995 (age 31)
Linus Rosner (GER)	30 March 2001 (age 25)
Nils Schomber (GER)	15 March 1994 (age 32)
Marten Schomburg (GER)	20 January 2001 (age 25)
Henri Uhlig (GER)	1 August 2001 (age 25)

== Major wins ==
2013
Stage 1 Okolo Jižních Čech, Theo Reinhardt
2014
Stage 3 Okolo Jižních Čech, Emanuel Buchmann
2015
Stage 2 Szlakiem Grodów Piastowskich, Pascal Ackermann
Stage 1 Dookoła Mazowsza, Kersten Thiele
Stage 4 Dookoła Mazowsza, Nils Schomber
2016
Prologue Tour de Normandie, Lucas Liss
Stages 2 & 3 Bałtyk–Karkonosze Tour, Maximilian Beyer
UCI Road World Championships under-23 time trial, Marco Mathis
2017
Stage 3 Bałtyk–Karkonosze Tour, Maximilian Beyer
Stage 3 Dookoła Mazowsza, Theo Reinhardt
2018
Stage 2 Tour of Fuzhou, Leon Rohde

== World, European & National Champions ==
2014
European U23 Track (Madison), Domenic Weinstein
German Track (Team Pursuit), Henning Bommel
German Track (Team Pursuit), Kersten Thiele
German Track (Team Pursuit), Nils Schomber
German Track (Team Pursuit), Theo Reinhardt
German Track (Individual Pursuit), Domenic Weinstein
German Track (Omnium), Theo Reinhardt

2015
World Track (Scratch race), Lucas Liß
German Track (Individual Pursuit), Domenic Weinstein
German Track (Team Pursuit), Domenic Weinstein
German Track (Team Pursuit), Henning Bommel
German Track (Team Pursuit), Nils Schomber
German Track (Team Pursuit), Theo Reinhardt
German Team Time Trial, Marco Mathis
German Team Time Trial, Kersten Thiele
German Team Time Trial, Joshua Stritzinger
German Team Time Trial, Nils Schomber
German Team Time Trial, Domenic Weinstein
German Team Time Trial, Theo Reinhardt

2017
German Track (Individual Pursuit), Domenic Weinstein
German Track (Team Pursuit), Kersten Thiele
German Track (Team Pursuit), Theo Reinhardt
German Track (Team Pursuit), Lucas Liß
German Track (Team Pursuit), Domenic Weinstein
German Track (Madison), Kersten Thiele
German Track (Madison), Theo Reinhardt
German Track (Scratch race), Lucas Liß
German U23 Time Trial, Patrick Haller
German Track (Scratch race), Leif Lampater
