= Henning Bommel =

German cyclist (born 1983)

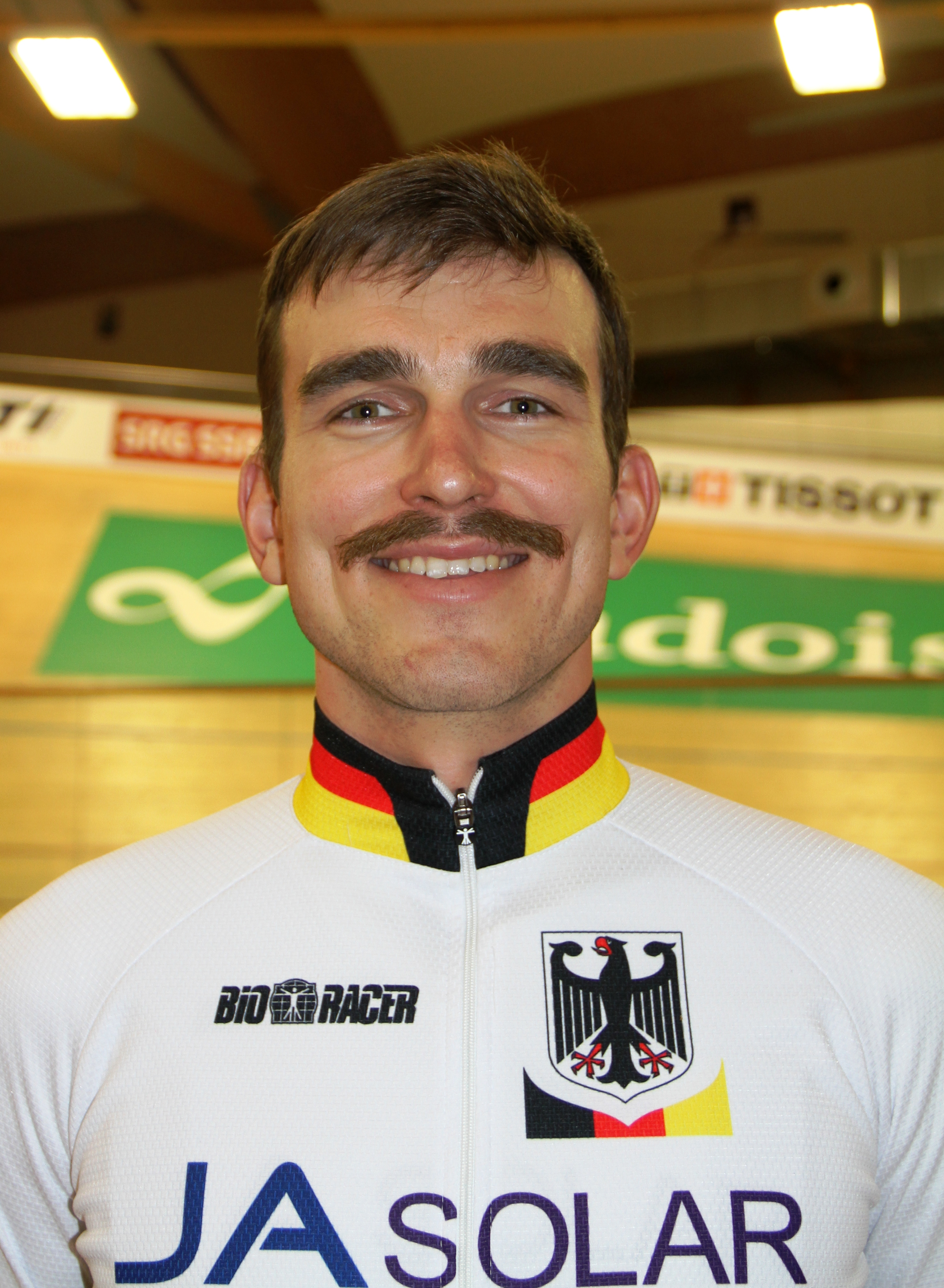
- Bommel in 2015

Personal information
- Born: 23 February 1983 (age 43) Finsterwalde, East Germany

Cycling career
- Sport: Cycling
- Current team: Dauner–Akkon
- Disciplines: Track; Road
- Role: Rider

Amateur teams
- 2004–2008: Berliner TSC
- 2004–2005: KED–Bianchi Rad-Team Berlin
- 2017: RK Endspurt 09 Cottbus
- 2018: Track Team Brandenburg
- 2018: KED–Stevens Radteam Berlin

Professional teams
- 2009–2012: LKT Team Brandenburg
- 2013–2017: Rad-Net Rose Team
- 2019: LKT Team Brandenburg
- 2020–: Dauner–Akkon

Henning Bommel (born 23 February 1983) is a German professional racing cyclist, who currently rides for UCI Continental team Dauner–Akkon. He rode at the 2015 UCI Track Cycling World Championships.

== Major results ==
=== Track ===
2001
1st Team pursuit, National Junior Track Championships (with Robert Bengsch, Daniel Musiol and Florian Piper)
2nd Team pursuit, UCI Juniors Track World Championships (with Robert Bengsch, Karl-Christian Konig and Christoph Meschenmoser)
2002
2nd Team pursuit, National Track Championships
2003
3rd Team pursuit, National Track Championships
2004
National Track Championships

2nd Madison
2nd Team pursuit

2005
3rd Team pursuit, National Track Championships
2nd Madison, National Track Championships
2007
3rd Points race, National Track Championships
2008
1st Team pursuit, National Track Championships (with Robert Bartko, Robert Bengsch and Frank Schulz)
2010
National Track Championships

1st Team pursuit (with Robert Bartko, Johannes Kahra and Stefan Schäfer)
2nd Madison

2011
1st Team pursuit, National Track Championships (with Nikias Arndt, Stefan Schäfer and Franz Schiewer)
2012
1st Team pursuit, National Track Championships (with Michel Koch, Kersten Thiele and Yuriy Vasyliv)
2nd Team pursuit, UEC European Track Championships (with Maximilian Beyer, Lucas Liss and Theo Reinhardt)
2013
3rd Madison, UCI Track Cycling World Championships (with Theo Reinhardt)
2014
1st Team pursuit, National Track Championships (with Theo Reinhardt, Nils Schomber and Kersten Thiele)
UEC European Track Championships

2nd Team pursuit (with Theo Reinhardt, Leon Rohde, Nils Schomber and Kersten Thiele)
3rd Points race

2015
1st Team pursuit, National Track Championships (with Theo Reinhardt, Nils Schomber and Domenic Weinstein)
2017
National Track Championships

1st Points race
3rd Team pursuit

2018
National Track Championships

2nd Madison
2nd Team pursuit

=== Road ===
2006
1st Stage 1 Tour de Serbie
2008
1st Stage 5 Tour of Bulgaria
2009
1st Road race, World Military Road Championships
2010
2nd Overall Dookoła Mazowska
2012
3rd Rund um den Sachsenring
2018
3rd Road race, World Military Road Championships
