= Domenic Weinstein =

German cyclist (born 1994)

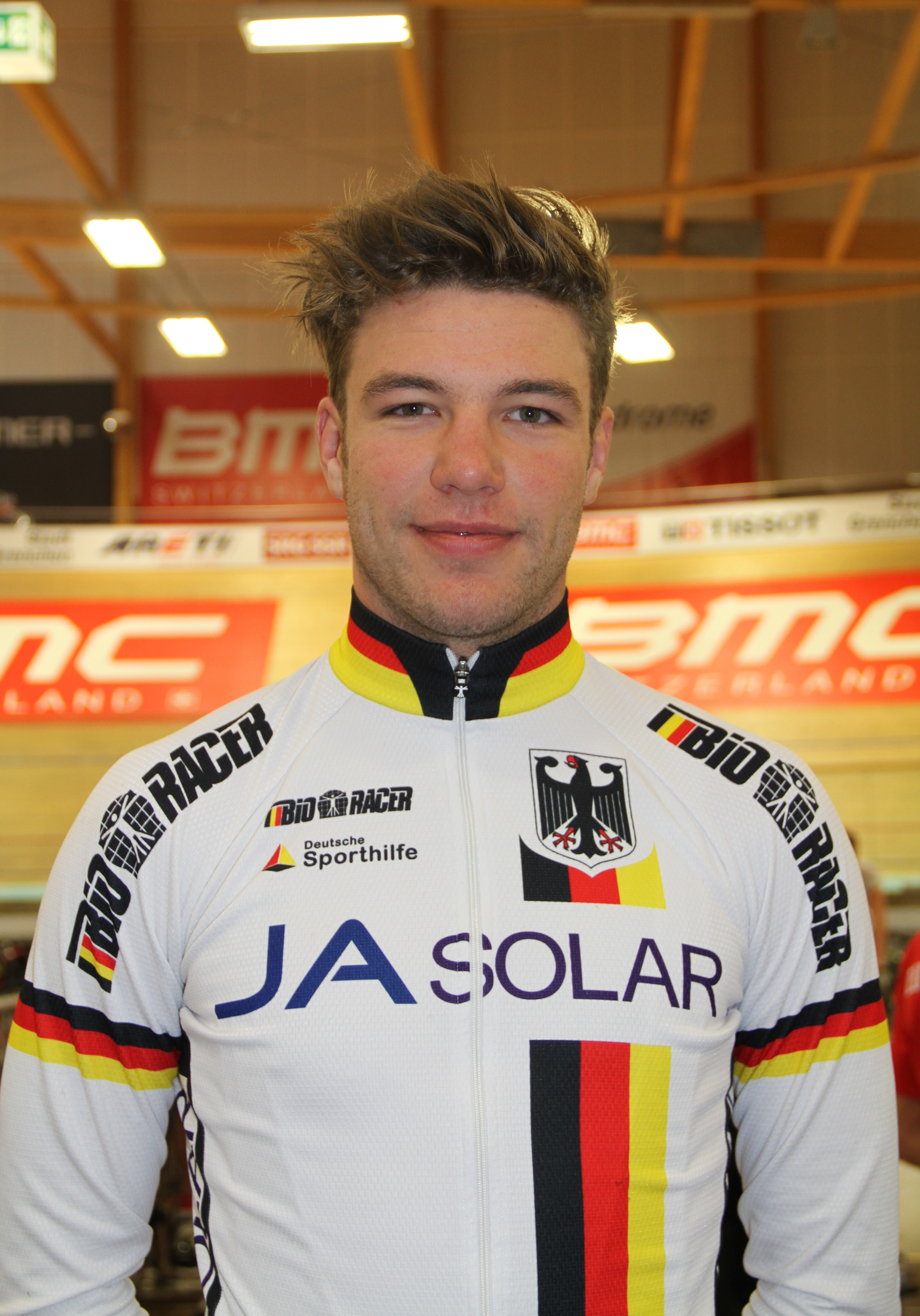
- Weinstein at the 2015 UEC European Track Championships

Personal information
- Full name: Domenic Weinstein
- Born: 27 August 1994 (age 32) Villingen-Schwenningen, Germany
- Height: 1.88 m (6 ft 2 in)
- Weight: 83 kg (183 lb)

Cycling career
- Sport: Cycling
- Disciplines: Road; Track
- Role: Rider
- Rider type: Pursuitist (track)

Amateur teams
- 2007–2012: RSC Donaueschingen
- 2011–2012: LV Team Rothaus Baden

Professional team
- 2013–2020: Rad-Net Rose Team
Medal record
Men's track cycling
Representing Germany
World Championships
Silver medal – second place	2016 London	Individual pursuit
Silver medal – second place	2019 Pruszków	Individual pursuit
European Championships
Gold medal – first place	2018 Glasgow	Individual pursuit
Silver medal – second place	2015 Grenchen	Individual pursuit
Silver medal – second place	2019 Apeldoorn	Individual pursuit
Bronze medal – third place	2017 Berlin	Individual pursuit

Domenic Weinstein (born 27 August 1994) is a German professional racing cyclist, who most recently rode for UCI Continental team Rad-Net Rose Team. He rode at the 2015 UCI Track Cycling World Championships.

== Major results ==
2011
1st Points race, UCI Junior Track World Championships
1st Madison, National Junior Track Championships (with Arne Egner)
2012
UEC European Junior Track Championships

3rd Team pursuit (with Leon Rohde, Nils Schomber and Jonas Tenbrock)
3rd Madison (with Pascal Ackermann)

2013
2nd Team sprint, National Track Championships
2014
UEC European Under-23 Track Championships

1st Madison (with Leon Rohde)
3rd Team pursuit (with Marco Mathis, Leon Rohde and Sebastian Wotschke)

2nd Individual pursuit, National Track Championships
3rd Time trial, National Under-23 Road Championships
2015
National Track Championships

1st Individual pursuit
1st Team pursuit (with Henning Bommel, Theo Reinhardt and Nils Schomber)
3rd Omnium

1st Team time trial, National Road Championships
1st Individual pursuit, UCI World Cup, Cali
2nd Individual pursuit, UEC European Track Championships
4th Time trial, National Under-23 Road Championships
6th Overall Dookoła Mazowsza
2016
1st Team time trial, National Road Championships
2nd Individual pursuit, UCI Track World Championships
2017
National Track Championships

1st Individual pursuit
1st Team pursuit (with Lucas Liss, Theo Reinhardt and Kersten Thiele)

2nd Team pursuit, UCI World Cup, Pruszków
3rd Individual pursuit, UEC European Track Championships
2018
1st Team pursuit, UEC European Track Championships
1st Individual pursuit, National Track Championships
2019
1st Team pursuit, UCI World Cup, Hong Kong
2nd Individual pursuit, UCI Track World Championships
2nd Individual pursuit, UEC European Track Championships
2021
UCI Track Nations Cup, Hong Kong

1st Team pursuit
2nd Individual pursuit

2022
3rd Team pursuit, UCI Track Nations Cup, Milton
