= Nils Schomber =

German cyclist

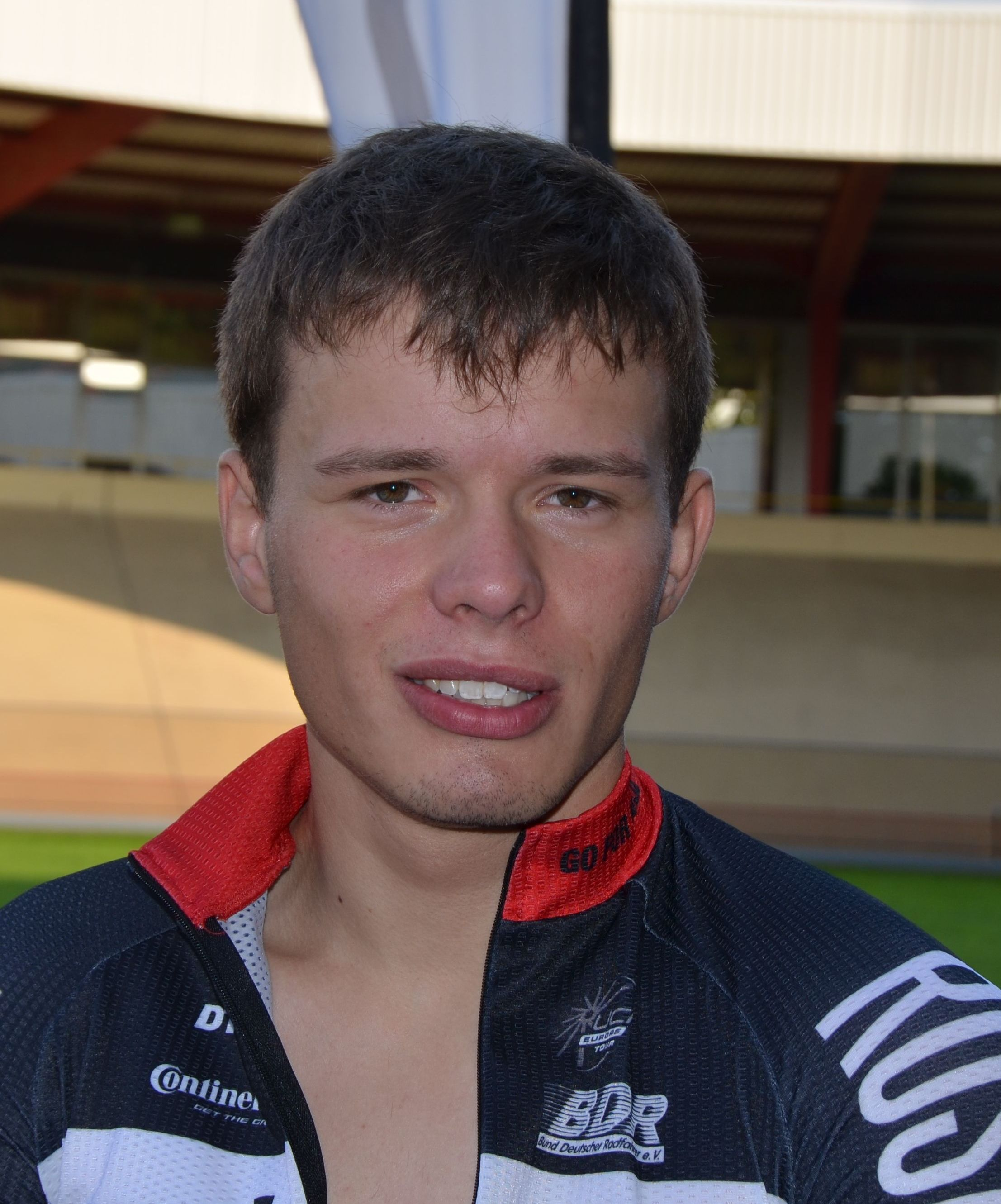
- Schomber in 2014

Personal information
- Full name: Nils Schomber
- Born: 15 March 1994 (age 32)

Cycling career
- Sport: Cycling
- Disciplines: Road; Track
- Role: Rider
- Rider type: Time trialist (road); Pursuitist (track)

Amateur teams
- 2006: RSC Grevenbroich
- 2007–2008: SG Kaarst
- 2009–2012: VfR Büttgen 1912
- 2011–2012: Sportforum Kaarst–Büttgen BL-Team

Professional team
- 2013–2021: Rad-Net Rose Team

Nils Schomber (born 15 March 1994) is a German cyclist, who most recently rode for UCI Continental team Rad-Net Rose Team. He rode in the individual pursuit and team pursuit at the 2014 UCI Track Cycling World Championships.

== Major results ==
2011
National Junior Track Championships

1st Individual pursuit
1st Team pursuit (with Ruben Zepuntke, Stefan Schneider and Nils Politt)

2012
National Junior Track Championships

1st Individual pursuit
1st Madison (with Nils Politt)

1st Time trial, National Junior Road Championships
UEC European Junior Track Championships

2nd Individual pursuit
3rd Team pursuit

2013
National Track Championships

2nd Omnium
3rd Scratch
3rd Team pursuit

2014
1st Team pursuit, National Track Championships (with Kersten Thiele, Henning Bommel and Theo Reinhardt)
2nd Team pursuit, UEC European Track Championships (with Henning Bommel, Theo Reinhardt, Leon Rohde and Kersten Thiele)
2015
1st Team pursuit, National Track Championships (with Henning Bommel, Theo Reinhardt and Domenic Weinstein)
National Road Championships

1st Team time trial
3rd Under-23 time trial

1st Stage 4 Dookoła Mazowsza
6th Overall Tour de Berlin
2017
2nd Team pursuit, National Track Championships
2018
National Track Championships

3rd Individual pursuit
3rd Team pursuit

2019
1st Team pursuit, National Track Championships (with Felix Groß, Theo Reinhardt and Leon Rohde)
