= Leon Rohde =

German cyclist (born 1995)

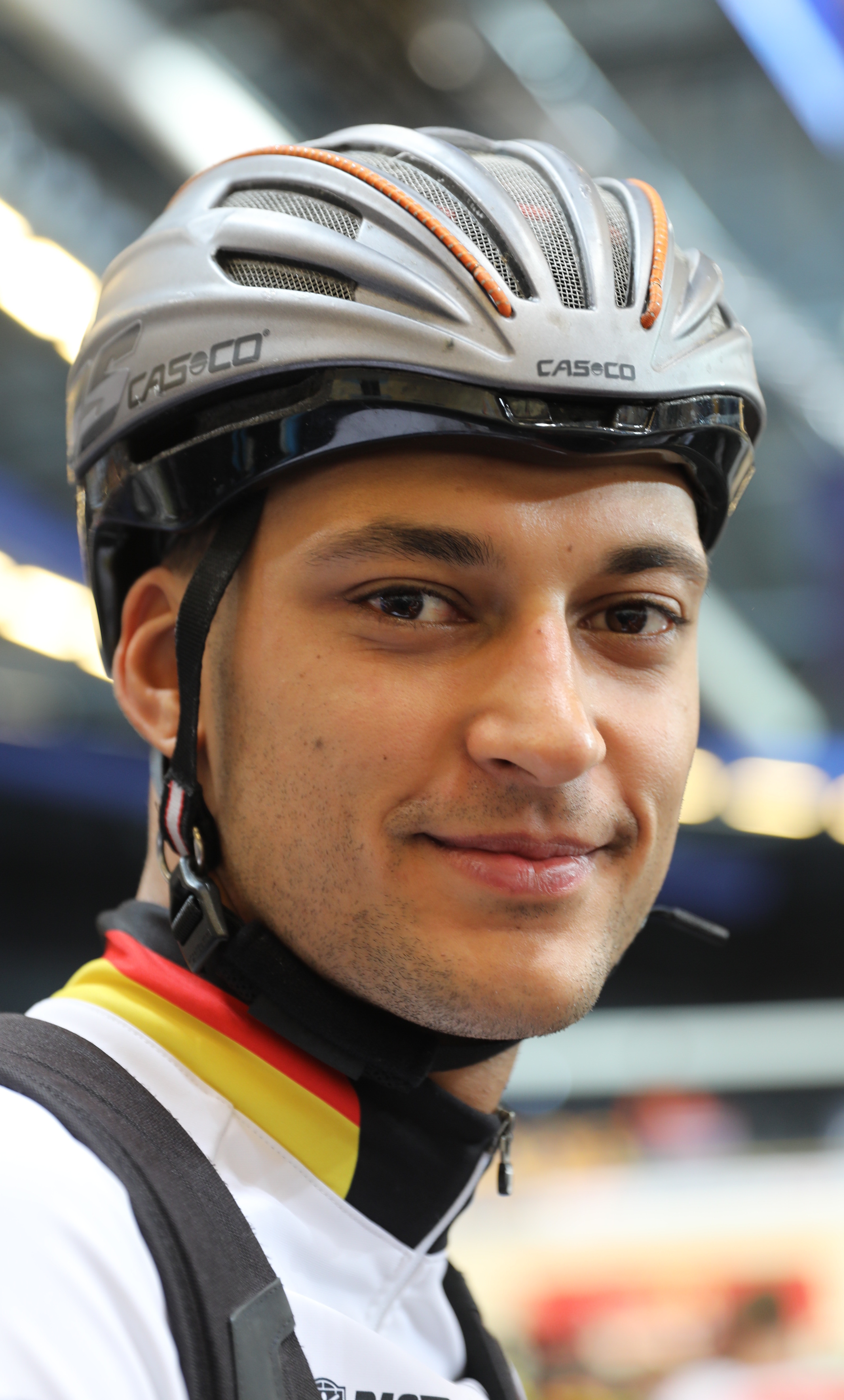
- Rohde in 2018

Personal information
- Full name: Leon R. Rohde
- Born: 10 May 1995 (age 31) Altona, Hamburg
- Height: 1.87 m (6 ft 2 in)
- Weight: 72 kg (159 lb)

Cycling career
- Sport: Cycling
- Disciplines: Track; Road
- Role: Rider

Amateur team
- 2017: Team Sunweb (stagiaire)

Professional teams
- 2014–2016: LKT Team Brandenburg
- 2017: Development Team Sunweb
- 2018–2022: Heizomat–rad-net.de
- 2023: Santic–Wibatech
Medal record
Representing Germany
Men's track cycling
European Championships
Silver medal – second place	2014 Baie-Mahault	Team pursuit

Leon R. Rohde (born 10 May 1995) is a German road and track cyclist, who last for UCI Continental team Santic–Wibatech.

== Major results ==
2011
1st Road race, National Novice Road Championships
National Novice Track Championships

1st Madison
1st Team pursuit

3rd Criterium, European Youth Summer Olympic Festival
2012
3rd Team pursuit, UEC European Junior Track Championships
3rd Overall Driedaagse van Axel
2013
National Junior Track Championships

1st Individual pursuit
1st Team pursuit

2nd Road race, National Junior Road Championships
3rd Omnium, National Track Championships
2014
UEC European Under-23 Track Championships

1st Madison (with Domenic Weinstein)
3rd Team pursuit

1st Points race, National Track Championships
5th Overall Tour de Berlin

1st Young riders classification

2015
1st Madison, 2015–16 UCI Track Cycling World Cup, Cali (with Kersten Thiele)
National Track Championships

2nd Individual pursuit
3rd Team pursuit

2016
3rd Team time trial, National Road Championships
3rd Individual pursuit, National Track Championships
8th Overall Carpathian Couriers Race U-23
10th Overall Tour de Berlin
2017
7th Overall Le Triptyque des Monts et Châteaux
8th ZLM Tour
2018
1st Stage 2 Tour of Fuzhou
National Track Championships

1st Scratch
3rd Team pursuit

3rd Team time trial, National Road Championships
2019
1st Team pursuit, National Track Championships (with Felix Groß, Theo Reinhardt and Nils Schomber)
2020
4th Puchar MON
2022
1st Team pursuit, National Track Championships
