= Frank Pasche =

Swiss cyclist

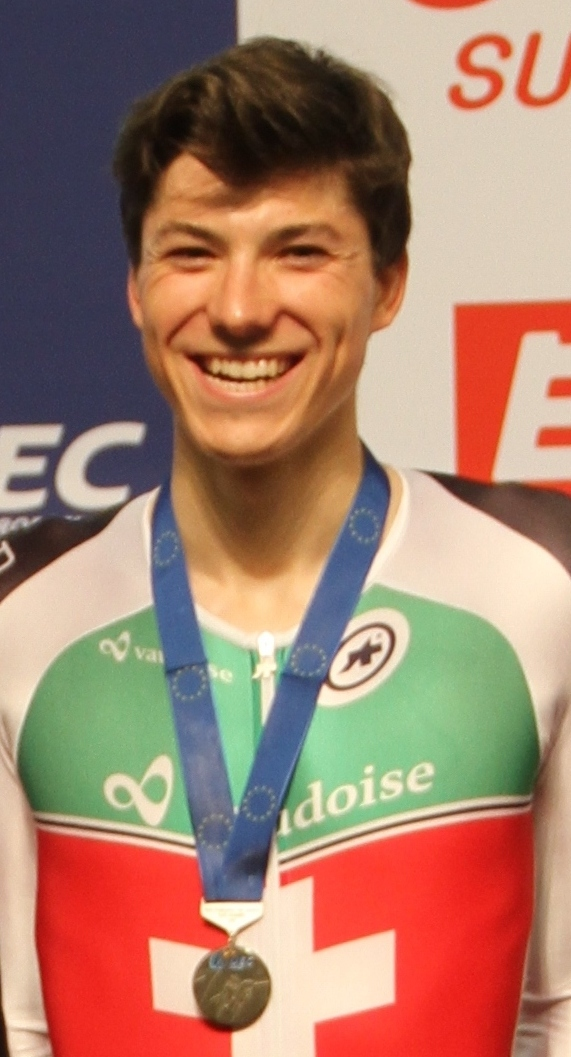
- Pasche in 2015

Personal information
- Full name: Frank Pasche
- Born: 19 March 1993 (age 33) Châtel-Saint-Denis, Switzerland

Cycling career
- Sport: Cycling
- Current team: Retired
- Disciplines: Track; Road
- Role: Rider

Amateur teams
- 2012–2013: Roth Echafaudages
- 2014–2015: VC Mendrisio–PL Valli
- 2017–2018: Cyclophile Lausannois
- 2018–2019: Team Vulco–VC Vaulx-en-Velin

Professional team
- 2016: Team Roth
Medal record
Representing Switzerland
Men's track cycling
European Championships
Silver medal – second place	2015 Grenchen	Team pursuit
Silver medal – second place	2018 Glasgow	Team pursuit

Frank Pasche (born 19 March 1993) is a Swiss former professional racing cyclist. He rode at the 2015 UCI Track Cycling World Championships, and is a two time silver medalist in the team pursuit at the UEC European Track Championships.

== Major results ==
=== Track ===
2012
2012–13 UCI World Cup

3rd Team pursuit, Cali

3rd Team pursuit, National Championships
2013
1st Team pursuit, UEC European Under-23 Championships
2014
1st Team pursuit, UEC European Under-23 Championships
National Championships

1st Madison (with Loïc Perizzolo)
1st Team pursuit
2nd Omnium
2nd Kilometer
2nd Scratch

2015
UEC European Under-23 Championships

1st Madison (with Théry Schir)
1st Omnium
2nd Team pursuit

National Championships

1st Kilometer
2nd Points race
3rd Madison
3rd Individual pursuit

2nd Team pursuit, UEC European Championships
2015–16 UCI World Cup

2nd Team pursuit, Cali

2016
3rd Omnium, National Championships
2017
National Championships

2nd Team pursuit
3rd Madison
3rd Individual pursuit

2018
2nd Team pursuit, UEC European Championships
2nd Kilometer, National Championships
2019
2018–19 UCI World Cup

3rd Team pursuit, Cambridge

=== Road ===
2015
National Under-23 Championships

2nd Road race
3rd Time trial

2018
4th Overall Tour of Mevlana
