= Alex Buttazzoni =

Italian cyclist

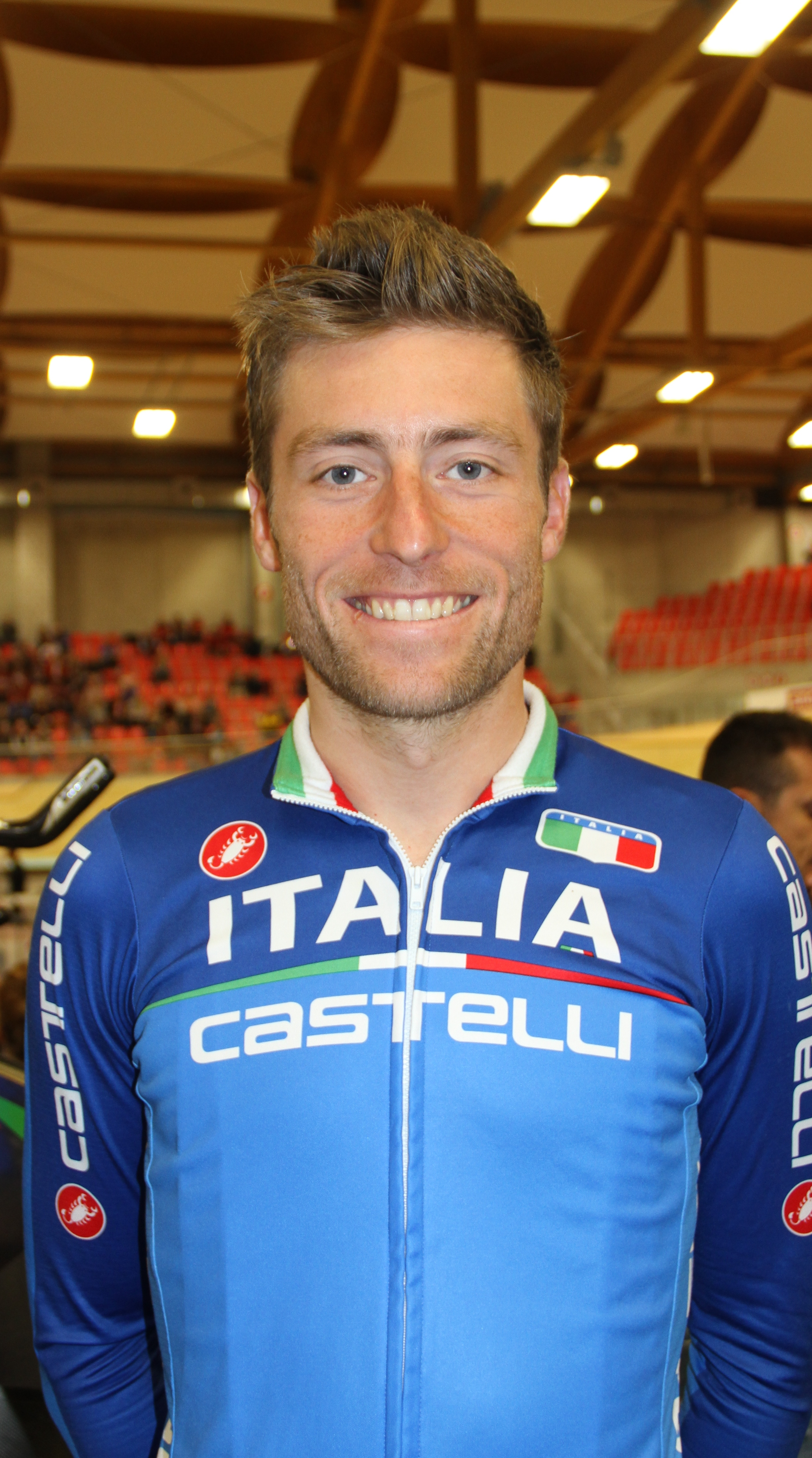
- Buttazzoni at the 2015 UEC European Track Championships

Personal information
- Born: 11 March 1985 (age 41) San Daniele del Friuli, Italy

Cycling career
- Sport: Cycling
- Role: Rider

Alex Buttazzoni (born 11 March 1985) is an Italian professional racing cyclist. He rode at the 2015 UCI Track Cycling World Championships.
