= Dion Beukeboom =

Dutch cyclist (born 1989)

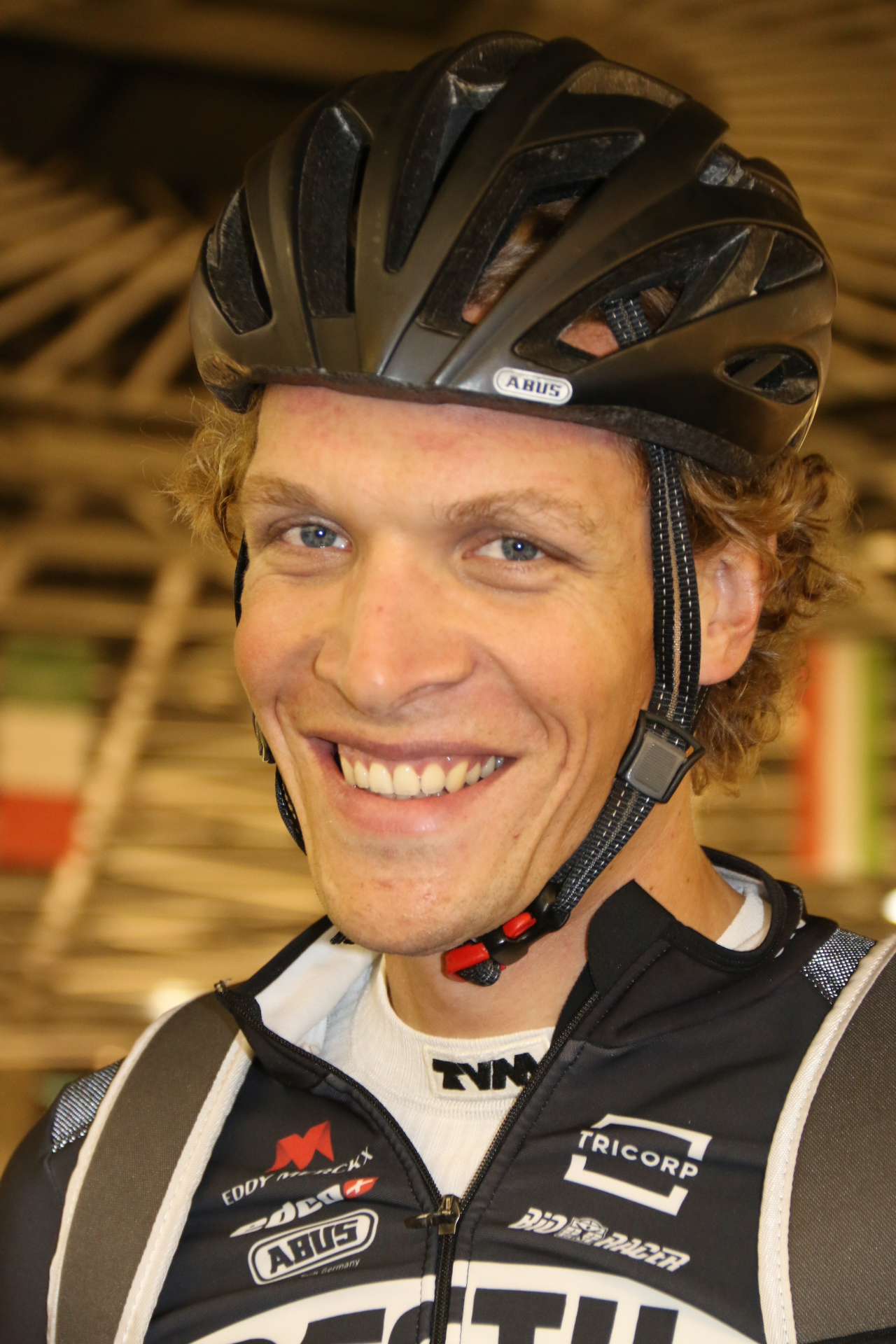
- Beukeboom at the 2017 UEC European Track Championships

Personal information
- Full name: Dion Beukeboom
- Born: 2 February 1989 (age 37)

Cycling career
- Sport: Cycling
- Current team: Retired
- Disciplines: Road; Track
- Role: Rider

Professional teams
- 2012–2014: Cycling Team De Rijke
- 2015–2016: Parkhotel Valkenburg Continental Team
- 2017: Destil–Jo Piels
- 2018–2019: Vlasman Cycling Team
Medal record
Representing Netherlands
Men's track cycling
European Championships
Bronze medal – third place	2015 Grenchen	Individual pursuit
Bronze medal – third place	2016 Yvelines	Individual pursuit

Dion Beukeboom (born 2 February 1989) is a Dutch former racing cyclist, who rode professionally between 2012 and 2019 for the Cyclingteam de Rijke, Parkhotel Valkenburg Continental Team, Destil–Jo Piels and Vlasman Cycling Team squads. He rode at the 2013 UCI Road World Championships.

== Major results ==
2011
5th Road race, National Under-23 Road Championships
2012
3rd Individual pursuit, National Track Championships
8th Overall Tour de Normandie

1st Stage 7

2013
1st Prologue (TTT) Volta a Portugal
National Track Championships

2nd Individual pursuit
2nd Scratch
3rd Omnium

3rd Team pursuit, UEC European Track Championships
2014
National Track Championships

1st Individual pursuit
2nd Scratch

2015
1st Stage 5a (ITT) Olympia's Tour
3rd Individual pursuit, UEC European Track Championships
7th Rutland–Melton CiCLE Classic
2016
National Track Championships

1st Individual pursuit
3rd Madison (with Jeff Vermeulen)

2nd Himmerland Rundt
3rd Individual pursuit, UEC European Track Championships
3rd Individual pursuit, 2016–17 UCI Track Cycling World Cup, Glasgow
4th Overall Flèche du Sud
5th Rutland–Melton CiCLE Classic
9th Ronde van Noord-Holland
2017
National Track Championships

1st Individual pursuit
2nd Madison (with Jan-Willem van Schip)

4th Ronde van Noord-Holland
2018
3rd Arno Wallaard Memorial
4th Time trial, National Road Championships
9th PWZ Zuidenveld Tour
