= Dawid Czubak =

Polish cyclist

Personal information
- Full name: Dawid Czubak
- Born: 30 September 1998 (age 28)

Cycling career
- Sport: Cycling
- Disciplines: Track; Road
- Role: Rider
- Rider type: Time-trialist

Professional team
- 2017–2018: Voster Uniwheels Team

Dawid Czubak (born 30 September 1998) is a Polish road and track cyclist, who last rode for UCI Continental team Voster ATS Team. Representing Poland at international competitions, Czubak competed at the 2016 UEC European Track Championships in the team pursuit event.
