= Louis Pijourlet =

French cyclist

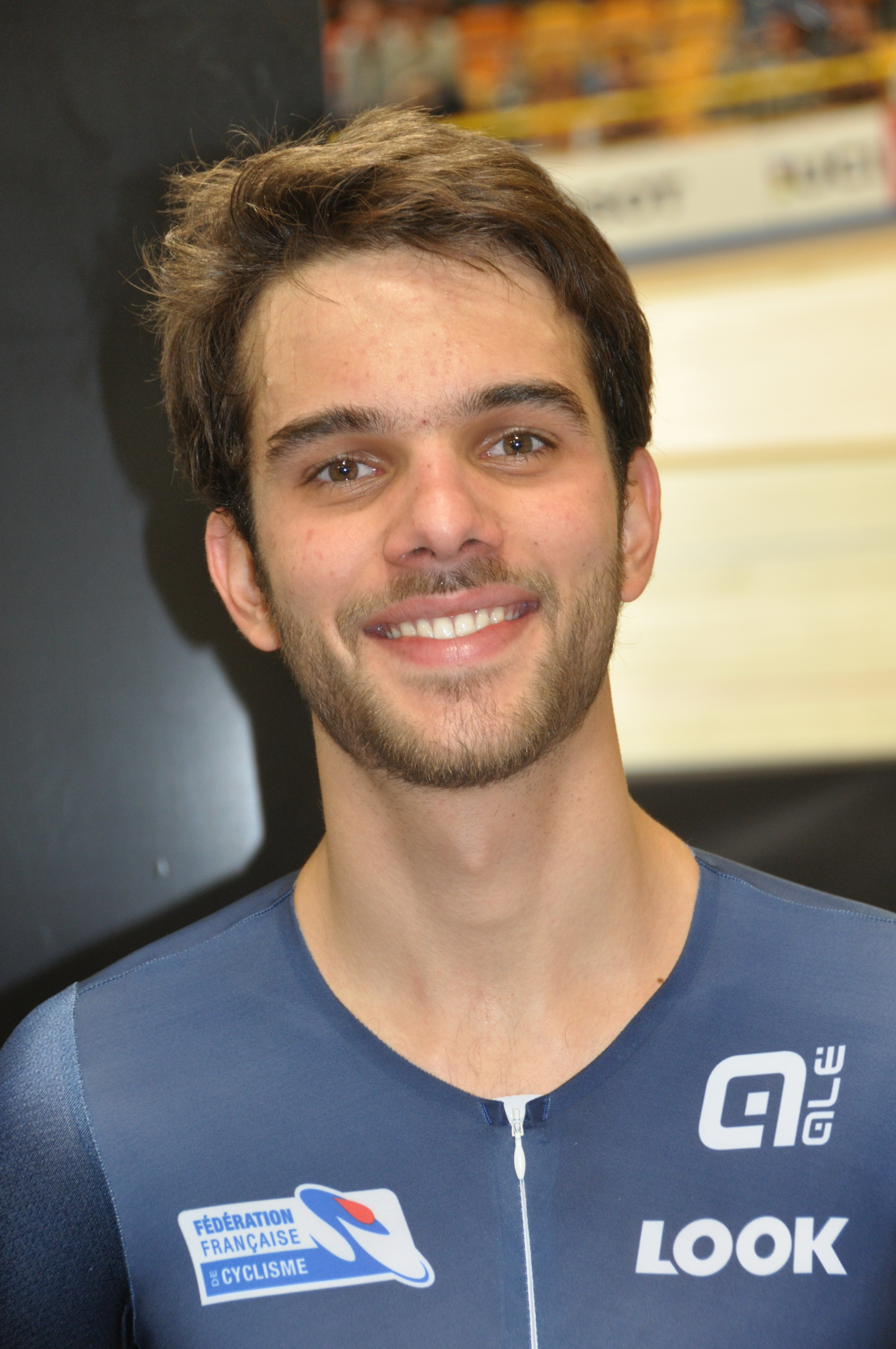
- Pijourlet in 2016

Personal information
- Born: 17 October 1995 (age 30)

Cycling career
- Sport: Cycling
- Discipline: Track cycling
Medal record
Representing France
Men's track cycling
European Championships
Gold medal – first place	2017 Berlin	Team pursuit
Men's para-cycling
Track World Championships
Silver medal – second place	2023 Glasgow	Individual pursuit B

Louis Pijourlet (born 17 October 1995) is a French male track cyclist, representing France at international competitions. He participated at the 2014 UEC European Track Championships in the men's team pursuit. He won the bronze medal at the 2016-17 UCI Track Cycling World Cup, Round 2 in Apeldoorn in the team pursuit.
