= Roman Fürst =

Czech cyclist

Roman Furst
Personal information
- Born: 5 May 1991 (age 35)

Cycling career
- Sport: Cycling
- Discipline: Track cycling
- Role: Rider
- Rider type: Individual pursuit

Roman Furst (born 5 May 1991) is a Czech male track cyclist. He competed in the individual pursuit event at the 2013 UCI Track Cycling World Championships.
