= Vélodrome Amédée Détraux =

Velodrome in Baie-Mahault, Guadeloupe, France

Vélodrome Amédée Detraux
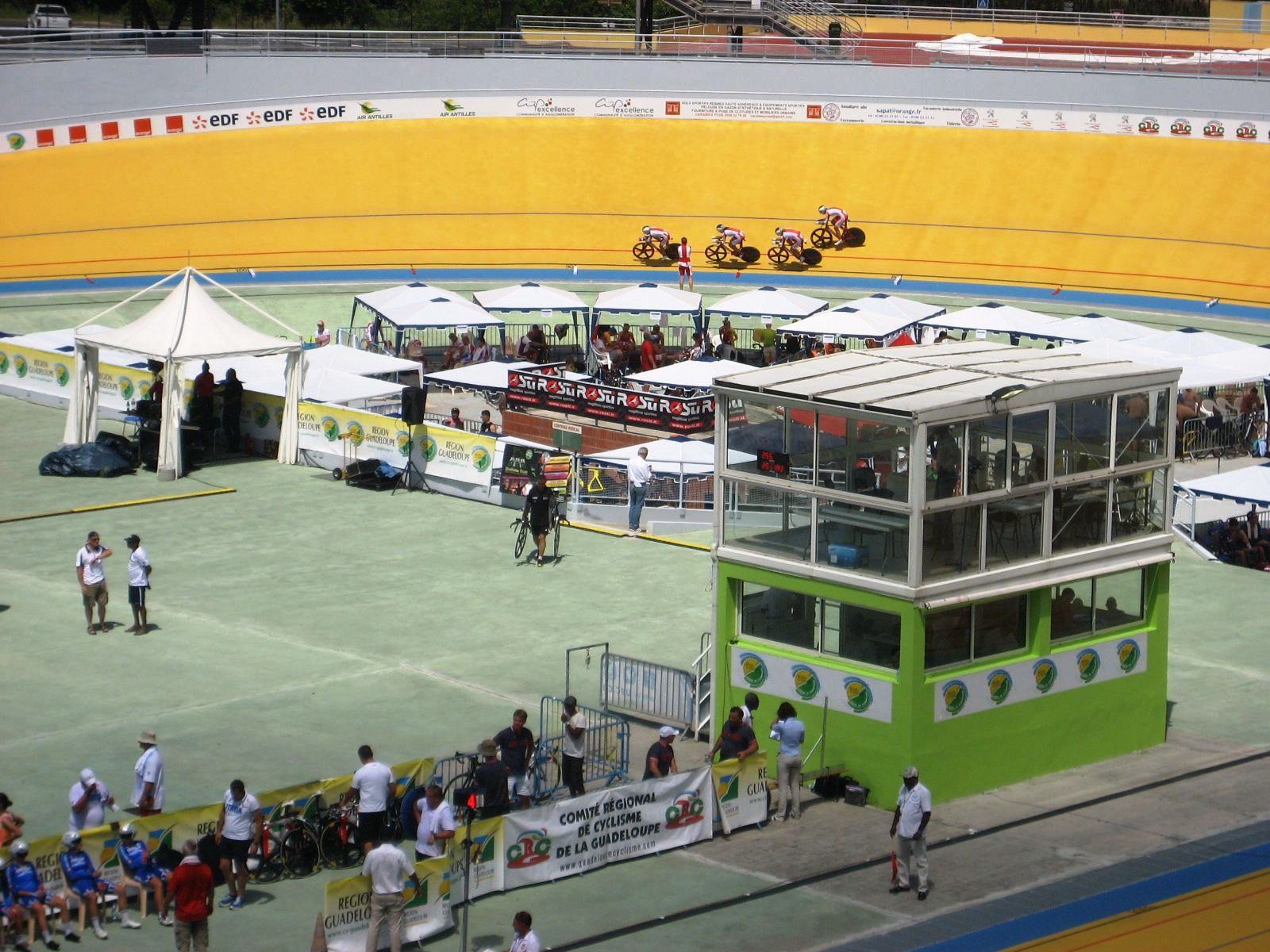
- Vélodrome Amédée Detraux (2014)
- Interactive map of Vélodrome Amédée Detraux
- Former names: Vélodrome de Gourde-Liane
- Location: Baie-Mahault, Guadeloupe, France
- Coordinates: 16.249274°N 61.594079°W
- Capacity: 9000
- Surface: Concrete

The Vélodrome Amédée Détraux is an outdoor velodrome in Baie-Mahault, Guadeloupe, France. Before 2010 it was called Vélodrome de Gourde-Liane. The concrete track has a length of 333 m (364 yd) and is the largest velodrome of the Antilles. It has a capacity for 9000 spectators, making it the largest stadium in Guadeloupe.

The track was used primarily for regional, national, and international track cycling sprint events. It was last used by a local team and the Guadeloupe national team in late 2015, one month before preparations began at the stadium to host the first round of the 2016 Davis Cup.

It hosted for the first time in the Antilles the French National Track Championships in 2009 and the 2014 UEC European Track Championships in October 2014.

It has been used for tennis, hosting the 2016 Davis Cup 1st round between France and Canada .

== See also ==
- List of cycling tracks and velodromes

Preceded by Omnisport Apeldoorn; Apeldoorn	European Track Championships; Venue; 2014	Succeeded by Velodrome Suisse; Grenchen
