= Illart Zuazubiskar =

Spanish cyclist (born 1990)

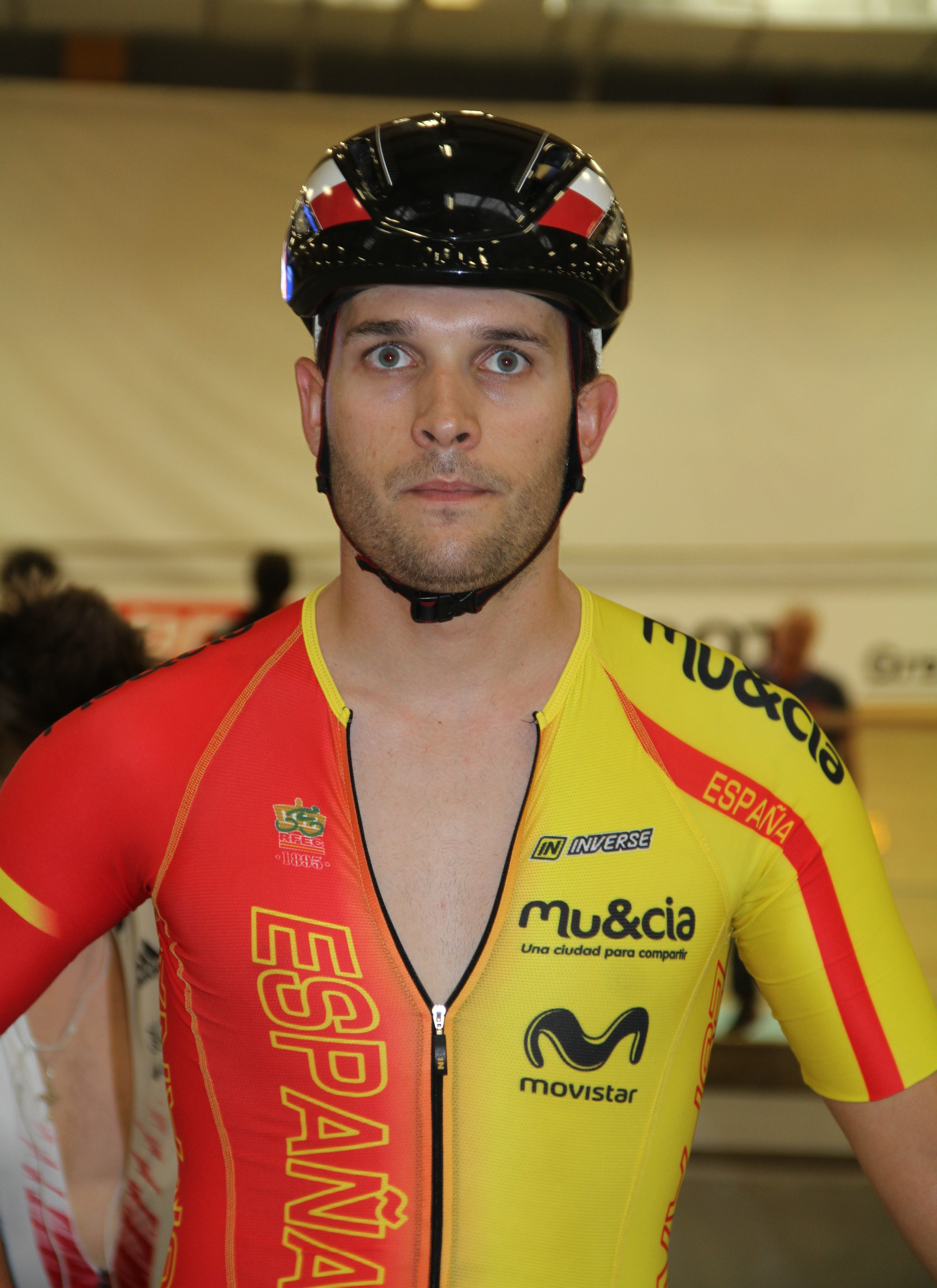
- Illart Zuazubiskar (2015)

Personal information
- Full name: Illart Zuazubiskar Gallastegi
- Born: 18 February 1990 (age 36) Durango, Biscay, Spain

Cycling career
- Sport: Cycling
- Disciplines: Track; Road
- Role: Rider

Amateur teams
- 2009–2011: Seguros Bilbao
- 2015: Fundación Euskadi–EDP
- 2016–2018: Ampo–Goierriko VG

Professional team
- 2012–2014: Orbea

Illart Zuazubiskar Gallastegi (born 2 February 1990) is a Spanish track cyclist. He competed at the 2015, 2016, 2018, 2020 and 2021 UCI Track Cycling World Championships.

== Major results ==
=== Track ===
2012
National Championships

2nd Individual pursuit
2nd Team pursuit

2013
2nd Individual pursuit, National Championships
2014
National Championships

2nd Individual pursuit
2nd Madison
2nd Team pursuit

2016
National Championships

2nd Team pursuit
3rd Madison

2017
3rd Team pursuit, National Championships
2018
National Championships

2nd Team pursuit
3rd Omnium
3rd Madison

2020
1st Madison, National Championships (with Xabier Azparren )
2021
1st Madison, National Championships (with Telmo Semperena)

=== Road ===
2011
5th Time trial, National Under-23 Road Championships
2014
1st Stage 1 (TTT) Tour de Gironde
2016
1st Stage 1 Vuelta a Cantabria
1st Stage 1 (TTT) Tour of Galicia
