= Liam Bertazzo =

Italian cyclist (born 1992)

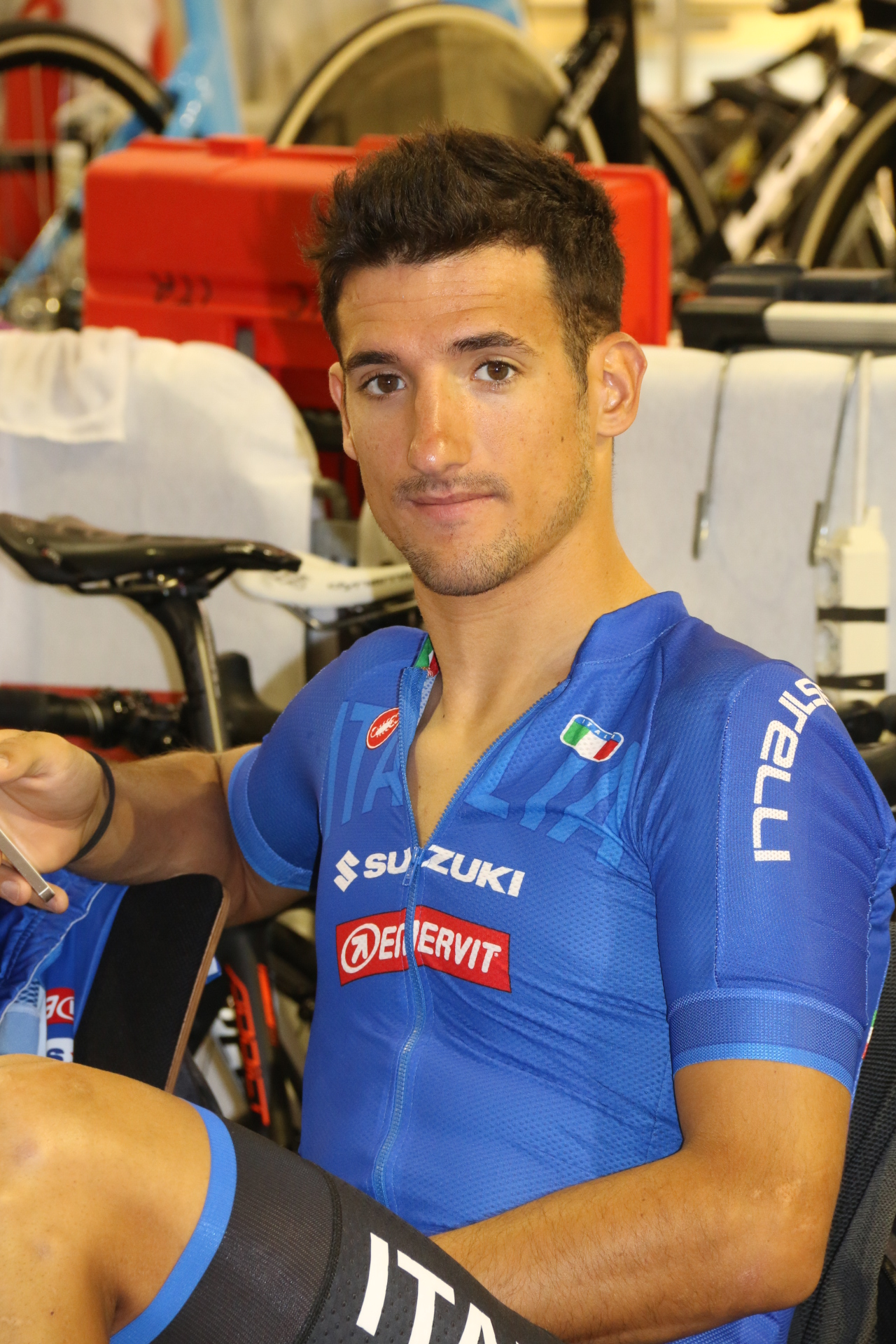
- Bertazzo in 2017

Personal information
- Born: 17 February 1992 (age 34) Este, Veneto, Italy
- Height: 180 cm (5 ft 11 in)
- Weight: 75 kg (165 lb)

Cycling career
- Sport: Cycling
- Current team: Maloja Pushbikers
- Disciplines: Road; Track
- Role: Rider

Amateur teams
- 2007–2008: ACD Monselice
- 2009–2010: Team La Torre
- 2011–2013: U.C. Trevigiani–Dynamon–Bottoli

Professional teams
- 2014: MG Kvis–Trevigiani
- 2015–2021: Southeast Pro Cycling
- 2022–: Maloja Pushbikers

Major wins
- Track World Championships Team pursuit (2021)
Medal record
Men's track cycling
Representing Italy
World Championships
Gold medal – first place	2021 Roubaix	Team pursuit
Silver medal – second place	2015 Yvelines	Madison
Bronze medal – third place	2017 Hong Kong	Team pursuit
Bronze medal – third place	2018 Apeldoorn	Team pursuit
European Games
Silver medal – second place	2019 Minsk	Team pursuit
European Championships
Gold medal – first place	2013 Apeldoorn	Madison
Gold medal – first place	2018 Glasgow	Team pursuit
Silver medal – second place	2014 Baie-Mahault	Points race
Silver medal – second place	2016 Yvelines	Team pursuit
Silver medal – second place	2017 Berlin	Team pursuit
Bronze medal – third place	2012 Panevėžys	Team pursuit

Liam Bertazzo (born 17 February 1992) is an Italian racing cyclist, who currently rides for UCI Continental team Maloja Pushbikers. He rode at the 2014 UCI Road World Championships. He was named in the start list for the 2016 Giro d'Italia.

== Major results ==
=== Road ===
2009
2nd Trofeo San Rocco
2012
9th Circuito del Porto
2013
2nd Circuito del Porto
2014
1st Stage 1 Tour de Serbie
3rd Gran Premio della Liberazione
4th Circuito del Porto
7th Road race, UEC European Under-23 Championships
2016
6th Dwars door het Hageland
2017
1st Overall Tour of China I

1st Points classification
1st Stage 2

6th Heistse Pijl
7th La Popolarissima
2020
3rd Team relay, UEC European Championships

==== Grand Tour general classification results timeline ====
Grand Tour	2016	2017	2018
Giro d'Italia	DNF	—	143
Tour de France	—	—	—
Vuelta a España	—	—	—

Legend
—	Did not compete
DNF	Did not finish

=== Track ===
2009
National Junior Championships

1st Points race
1st Team pursuit

2010
1st Team pursuit, National Junior Championships
2nd Team pursuit, UEC European Junior Championships
2011
3rd Madison, National Championships (with Omar Bertazzo)
2012
National Championships

2nd Scratch
3rd Madison (with Omar Bertazzo)

3rd Team pursuit, UEC European Championships
2013
1st Madison, UEC European Championships (with Elia Viviani)
2014
2nd Points race, UEC European Championships
National Championships

2nd Points race
3rd Individual pursuit

2015
2nd Madison, UCI World Championships (with Elia Viviani)
2016
2nd Team pursuit, UEC European Championships
2nd Omnium, National Championships
2017
1st Team pursuit, UCI World Cup, Pruszków
2nd Team pursuit, UEC European Championships
3rd Team pursuit, UCI World Championships
2018
1st Team pursuit, UEC European Championships
1st Six Days of Fiorenzuola (with Francesco Lamon)
3rd Team pursuit, UCI World Championships
2019
2nd Team pursuit, European Games
2021
1st Team pursuit, UCI World Championships
