= Marco Coledan =

Italian cyclist

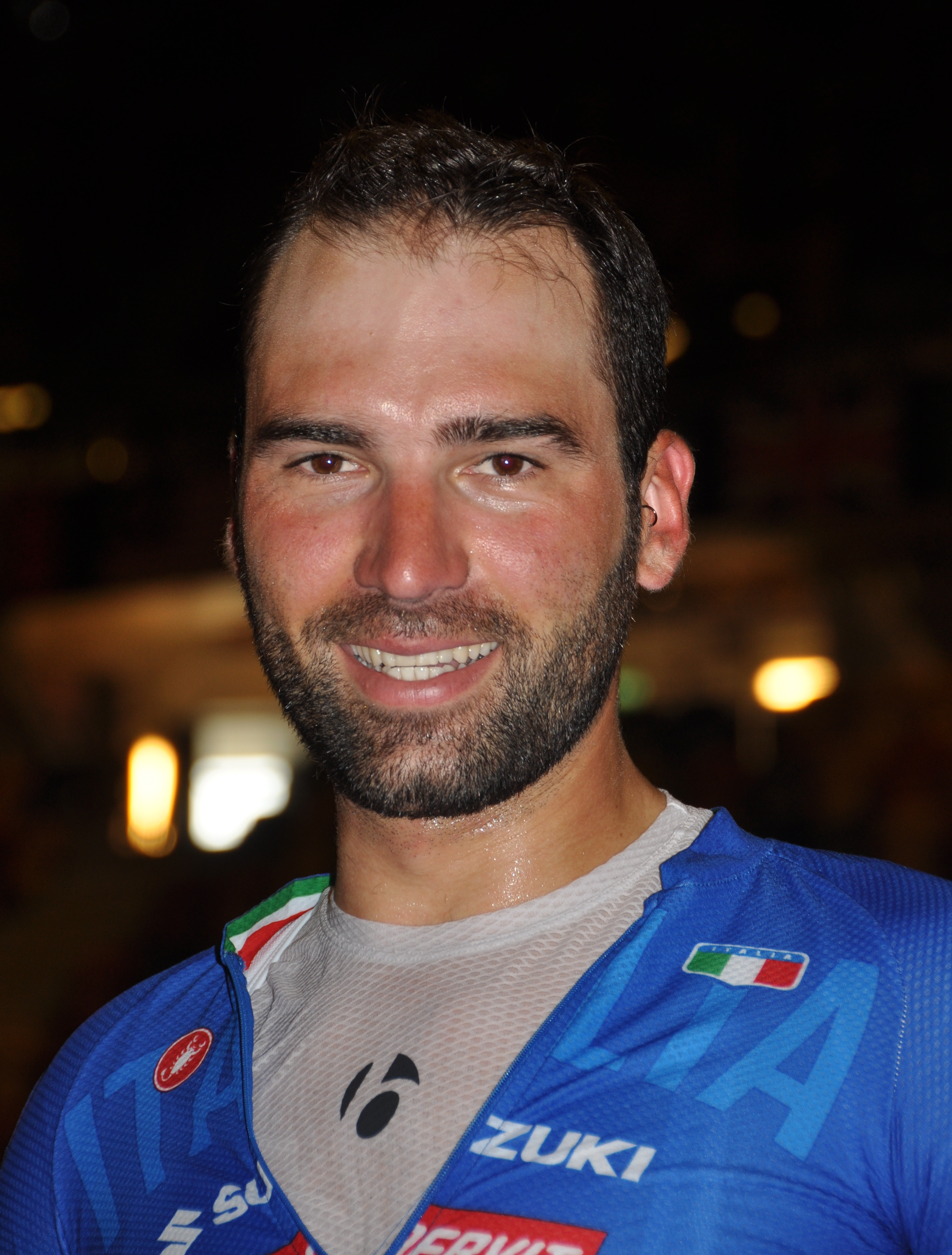
- Coledan at the 2018 UCI Track Cycling World Championships

Personal information
- Born: 22 August 1988 (age 38) Motta di Livenza, Italy
- Height: 1.90 m (6 ft 3 in)
- Weight: 83 kg (183 lb; 13.1 st)

Cycling career
- Sport: Cycling
- Current team: Retired
- Disciplines: Road; Track
- Role: Rider
- Rider type: All-rounder

Amateur team
- 2007–2011: U.C. Trevigiani–Dynamon

Professional teams
- 2012–2014: Colnago–CSF Bardiani
- 2015–2017: Trek Factory Racing
- 2018: Wilier Triestina–Selle Italia
Medal record
Representing Italy
Men's track cycling
World Championships
Silver medal – second place	2015 Yvelines	Madison
European Championships
Gold medal – first place	2006 Athens	Junior individual pursuit
Bronze medal – third place	2008 Pruszków	Under-23 individual pursuit
Bronze medal – third place	2010 Saint Petersburg	Under-23 individual pursuit

Marco Coledan (born 22 August 1988) is an Italian former road and track racing cyclist, who rode professionally between 2012 and 2018 for the Bardiani–CSF, Trek–Segafredo and Wilier Triestina–Selle Italia teams. He participated in four Grand Tours: the Giro d'Italia in 2012, 2015, 2016 and 2018.

== Major results ==
2006
1st Individual pursuit, UEC European Junior Track Championships
2007
3rd Time trial, National Under-23 Road Championships
2008
3rd Individual pursuit, UEC European Under-23 Track Championships
2009
1st Stage 1 Giro della Regione Friuli Venezia Giulia
6th Memorial Davide Fardelli
2010
3rd Individual pursuit, UEC European Under-23 Track Championships
2011
6th Circuito del Porto
2012
1st Stage 1b (TTT) Monviso-Venezia — Il Padania
2013
1st Individual pursuit, 2013–14 UCI Track Cycling World Cup, Manchester
3rd Team pursuit, 2012–13 UCI Track Cycling World Cup, Aguascalientes
2014
1st Six Days of Fiorenzuola (with Alex Buttazzoni)
2015
1st Stage 1 (TTT) Tour of Alberta
2nd Madison, UCI Track World Championships (with Elia Viviani)
2016
5th Road race, National Road Championships
2018
1st Stage 8 Tour du Maroc

=== Grand Tour general classification results timeline ===
Grand Tour	2012	2013	2014	2015	2016	2017	2018
Giro d'Italia	153	—	—	163	129	—	146
Tour de France	Did not contest during career						
Vuelta a España	Did not contest during career						

Legend
—	Did not compete
DNF	Did not finish
