= Alexey Kurbatov =

Russian bicycle racer

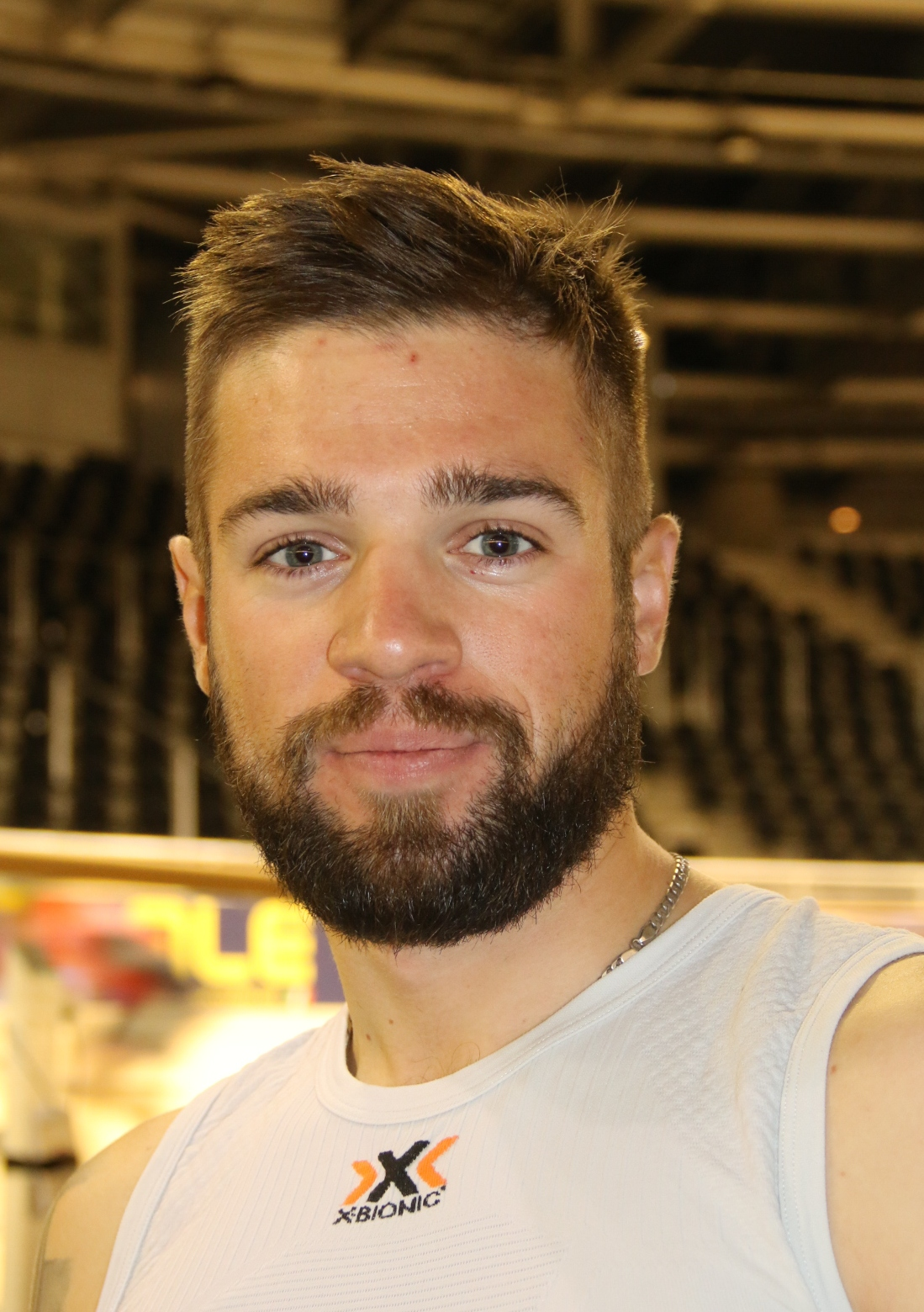
- Kurbatov in 2017.

Personal information
- Full name: Alexey Yuryevich Kurbatov
- Born: 9 May 1994 (age 32) Russia

Cycling career
- Sport: Cycling
- Discipline: Road
- Role: Rider

Amateur teams
- 2017: Moscow
- 2018: MGFSO

Professional teams
- 2013–2014: Russian Helicopters
- 2015–2016: RusVelo
- 2019: Gazprom–RusVelo
Medal record
European Championships
Bronze medal – third place	2017 Berlin	Team Pursuit

Alexey Yuryevich Kurbatov (Russian: Алексей Юрьевич Курбатов; born 9 May 1994) is a Russian cyclist, who most recently rode for UCI Professional Continental team Gazprom–RusVelo. He participated in the 2016 Olympics road race.
