= Felix Groß =

German cyclist

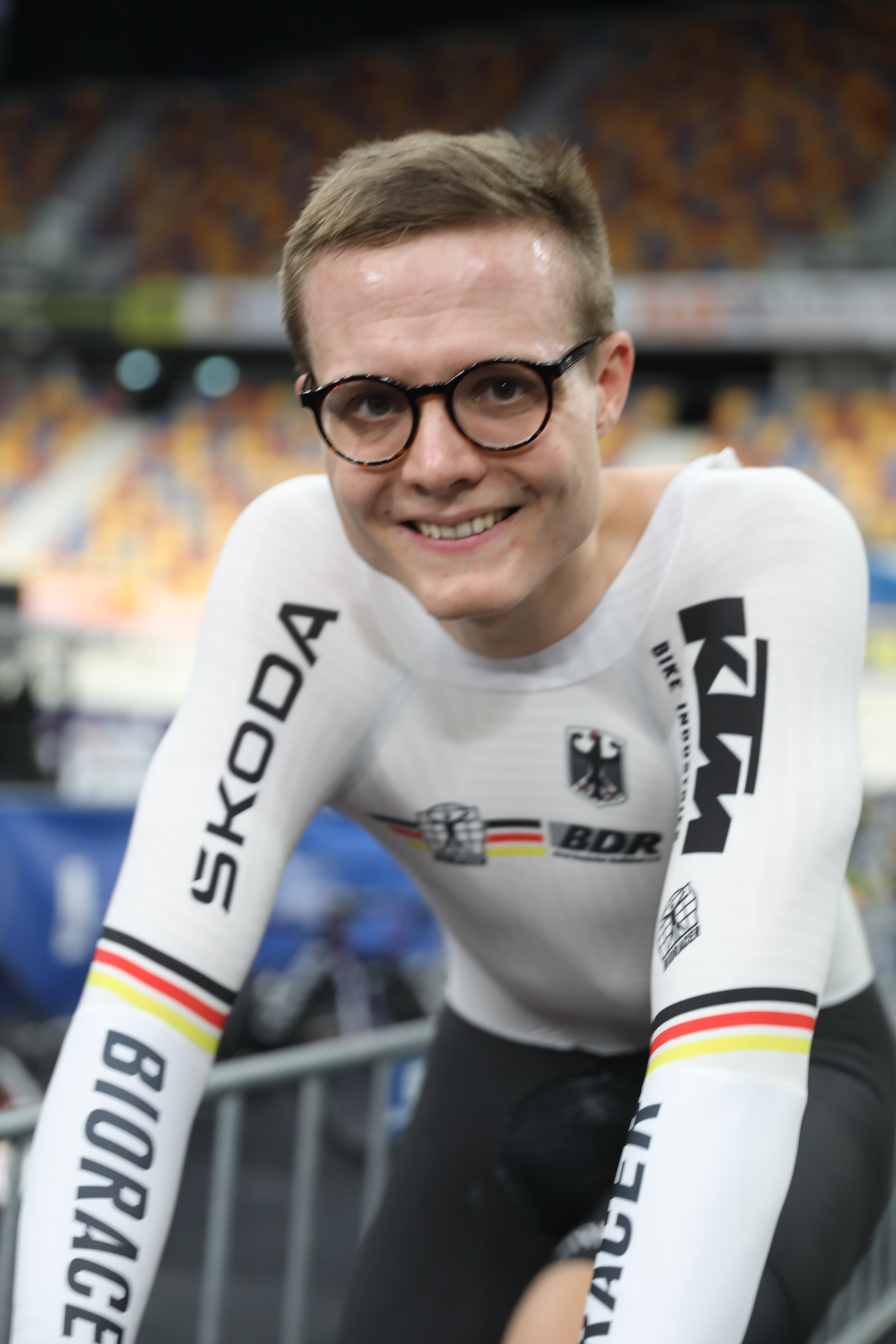
- Groß in 2024

Personal information
- Full name: Felix Groß
- Born: 4 September 1998 (age 28) Feuchtwangen, Germany
- Height: 1.84 m (6 ft 0 in)
- Weight: 71 kg (157 lb)

Cycling career
- Sport: Cycling
- Current team: Rad-Net Oßwald
- Disciplines: Track; Road
- Role: Rider

Amateur teams
- 2008–2010: SC DHfK Leipzig
- 2011–2016: RSV 54 Venusberg
- 2015–2016: Junioren Schwalbe Team Sachsen

Professional teams
- 2017–2021: Rad-Net Rose Team
- 2021: UAE Team Emirates (stagiaire)
- 2022–2023: UAE Team Emirates
- 2024–: Rad-Net Oßwald
Medal record
Representing Germany
Men's track cycling
World Championships
Bronze medal – third place	2024 Ballerup	Team pursuit
European Championships
Bronze medal – third place	2019 Apeldoorn	Individual pursuit

Felix Groß (anglicised as Gross; born 4 September 1998) is a German cyclist, who currently rides for UCI Continental team Rad-Net Oßwald. He rode in the men's team pursuit event at the 2018 UCI Track Cycling World Championships.

In May 2021, Groß signed a three-year contract with UCI WorldTeam UAE Team Emirates, to commence from the start of the 2022 season. Prior to this, Groß rode for the team as a stagiaire in the second half of the 2021 season. He ended up leaving the team at the end of the 2023 season.

== Major results ==
=== Road ===
2016
National Junior Championships

1st Road race
3rd Time trial

9th Time trial, UEC European Junior Championships
2018
3rd Time trial, Military World Games
2019
1st An der Red Bull Arena
1st Stage 2 Oderrundfahrt
2020
1st Puchar Ministra Obrony Narodowej
4th Overall Dookoła Mazowsza

1st Points classification
1st Young rider classification
1st Stages 2 (ITT) & 4

=== Track ===
2016
National Junior Championships

1st Individual pursuit
2nd Team sprint

2017
2nd Team pursuit, National Championships
2017–18 UCI World Cup

3rd Team pursuit, Pruszków

2018
1st Individual pursuit, UEC European Under-23 Championships
National Championships

1st Team pursuit
2nd Individual pursuit

2019
1st Individual pursuit, UEC European Under-23 Championships
2019–20 UCI World Cup

1st Team pursuit, Hong Kong

National Championships

1st Individual pursuit
1st Team pursuit
2nd Kilometer

3rd Individual pursuit, UEC European Championships
2020
UEC European Under-23 Championships

1st Individual pursuit
1st Kilometer
3rd Team pursuit

2021
UCI Nations Cup

1st Kilometer, Hong Kong
1st Team pursuit, Hong Kong

2024
National Championships

1st Individual pursuit
1st Team pursuit
2nd Kilometer

3rd Team pursuit, UCI World Championships
