= Mikhail Shemetau =

Belarusian cyclist

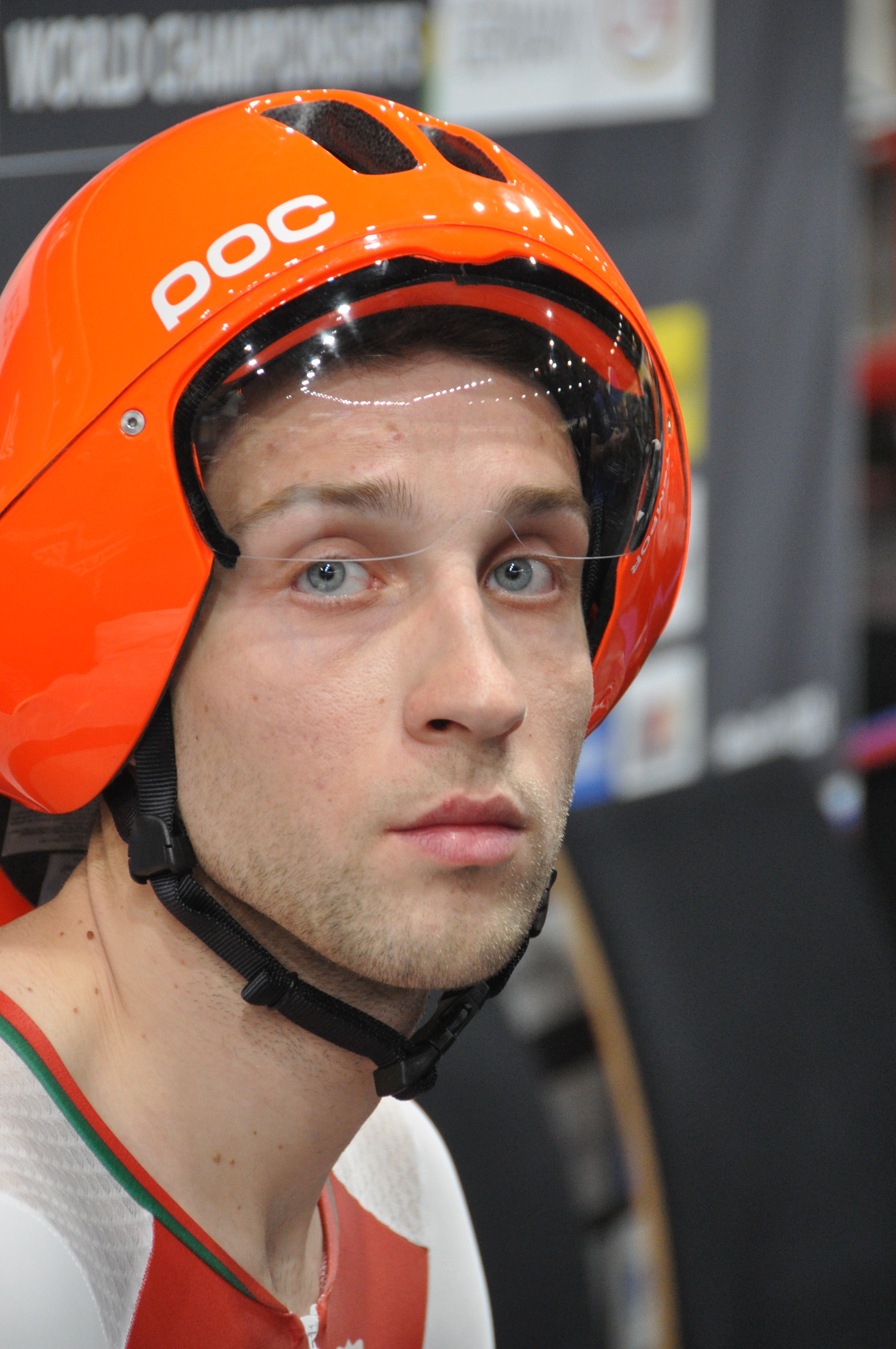
- Shemetau at the 2020 UCI Track Cycling World Championships

Personal information
- Full name: Mikhail Shemetau
- Born: 21 July 1994 (age 32) Grodno, Belarus

Cycling career
- Sport: Cycling
- Disciplines: Track; Road
- Role: Rider

Professional team
- 2017: Minsk Cycling Club

Mikhail Shemetau (born 21 July 1994) is a Belarusian road and track cyclist, who represents Belarus at international competitions. He competed at the 2016 UCI Track Cycling World Championships in the individual pursuit event and at the 2016 UEC European Track Championships in the team pursuit event.
