= Loïc Perizzolo =

Swiss cyclist

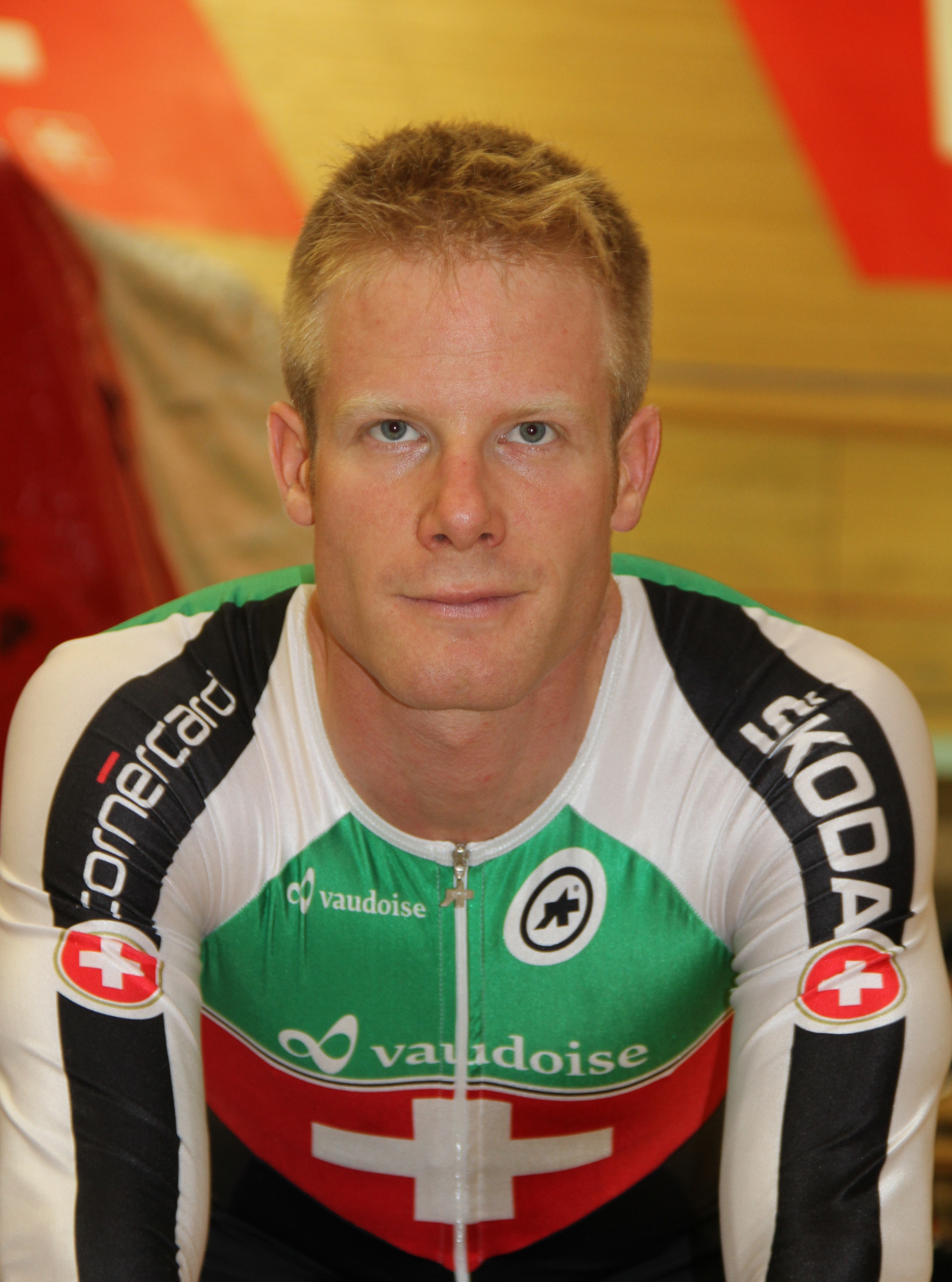

Personal information
- Born: 20 October 1988 (age 37) Veyrier, Switzerland

Cycling career
- Sport: Cycling
- Discipline: Track
- Role: Rider
Medal record
Representing Switzerland
Men's track cycling
European Championships
Gold medal – first place	2016 Yvelines	Elimination race

Loïc Perizzolo (born 20 October 1988, in Veyrier) is a Swiss racing cyclist who competes on the track.

== Career wins ==
2006 - UIV Cup Dortmund, U23 (GER)
