= Theo Reinhardt =

German cyclist (born 1990)

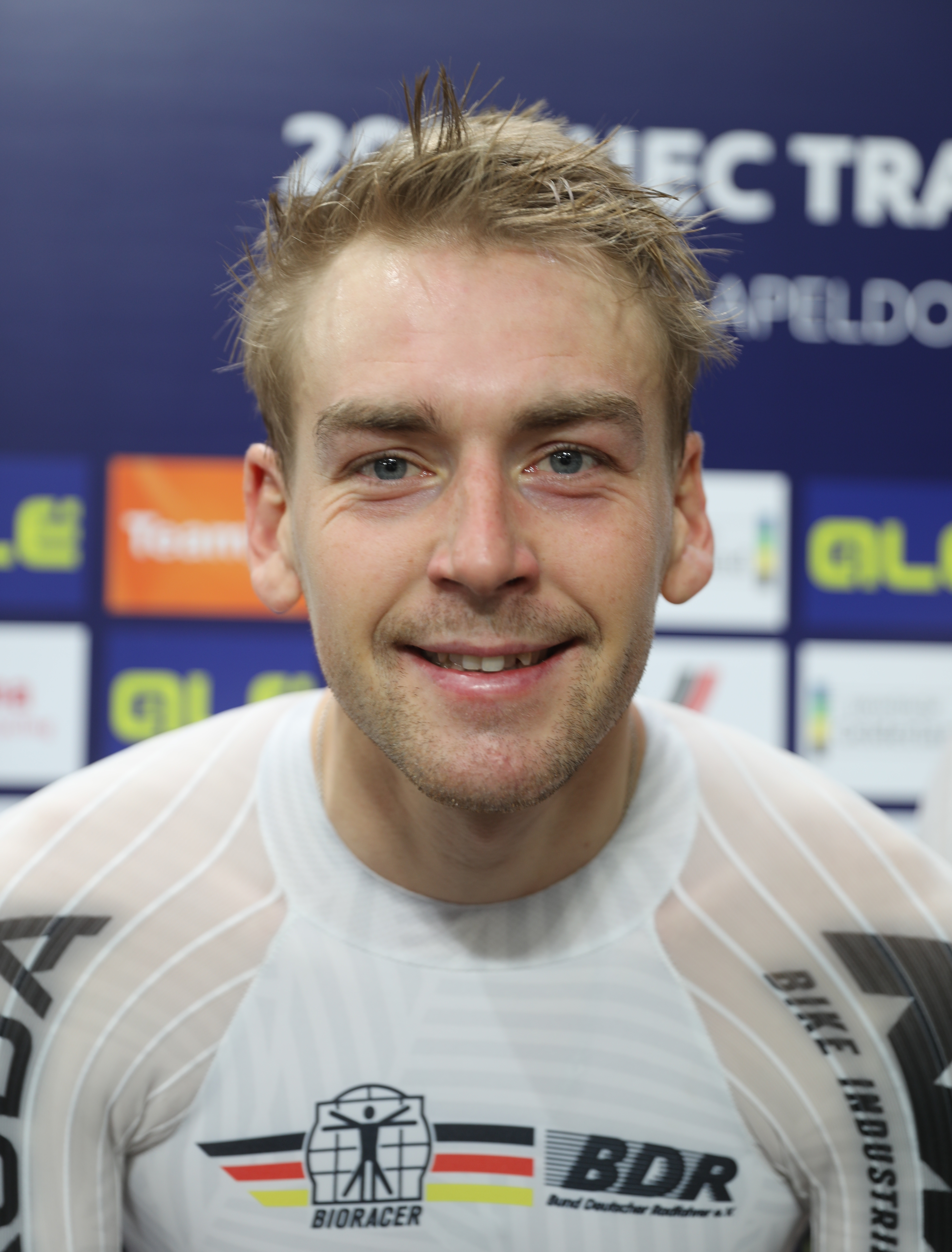
- Reinhardt in 2024

Personal information
- Full name: Theo Reinhardt
- Born: 17 September 1990 (age 36) Berlin, Germany
- Height: 1.77 m (5 ft 10 in)
- Weight: 68 kg (150 lb)

Cycling career
- Sport: Cycling
- Current team: Rad-Net Oßwald
- Disciplines: Track; Road
- Role: Rider

Amateur team
- 2012: SC Berlin RG KED

Professional team
- 2013–: Rad-Net Rose Team

Major wins
- Track World Championships Madison (2018, 2019)
Medal record
Men's track cycling
Representing Germany
World Championships
Gold medal – first place	2018 Apeldoorn	Madison
Gold medal – first place	2019 Pruszków	Madison
Bronze medal – third place	2013 Minsk	Madison
Bronze medal – third place	2020 Berlin	Madison
European Championships
Gold medal – first place	2022 Munich	Madison
Gold medal – first place	2023 Grenchen	Madison
Gold medal – first place	2024 Apeldoorn	Madison
Silver medal – second place	2012 Panevėžys	Team pursuit
Silver medal – second place	2014 Baie-Mahault	Team pursuit
Silver medal – second place	2018 Glasgow	Madison
Silver medal – second place	2022 Munich	Elimination
Bronze medal – third place	2019 Apeldoorn	Madison

Theo Reinhardt (born 17 September 1990) is a German professional racing cyclist, who currently rides for UCI Continental team Rad-Net Oßwald. He has competed at the UCI Track Cycling World Championships, every year since 2013.

== Major results ==
=== Road ===
2010
6th Overall Tour du Loir-et-Cher
2011
1st Stage 4 Tour de Berlin
2013
2nd Overall Okolo Jižních Čech

1st Stage 1

5th Overall Tour de Serbie
2015
1st Team time trial, National Championships
1st Stage 3 Okolo Jižních Čech
2017
1st Stage 3 Dookoła Mazowsza

=== Track ===
2008
1st Madison, National Junior Championships (with Thomas Juhas)
3rd Team pursuit, UEC European Junior Championships
2010
UEC European Under-23 Championships

2nd Team pursuit
3rd Madison (with Ralf Matzka)

2012
2nd Team pursuit, UEC European Championships
2013
3rd Madison, UCI World Championships (with Henning Bommel)
2014
National Championships

1st Omnium
1st Team pursuit

2nd Team pursuit, UEC European Championships
2015
1st Team pursuit, National Championships
2017
National Championships

1st Madison (with Kersten Thiele)
1st Team pursuit

2018
1st Madison, UCI World Championships (with Roger Kluge)
2nd Madison, UEC European Championships (with Roger Kluge)
3rd Six Days of London (with Roger Kluge)
3rd Six Days of Berlin (with Roger Kluge)
2019
1st Madison, UCI World Championships (with Roger Kluge)
National Championships

1st Madison (with Maximilian Beyer)
1st Points race
1st Team pursuit

1st Six Days of Berlin (with Roger Kluge)
3rd Madison, UEC European Championships (with Maximilian Beyer)
2020
3rd Madison, UCI World Championships (with Roger Kluge)
2022
1st Six Days of Berlin (with Roger Kluge)
2nd Elimination, UEC European Championships
2024
1st Madison, UEC European Championships (with Roger Kluge)
2nd Three Days of London (with Roger Kluge)
