= Kersten Thiele =

German cyclist

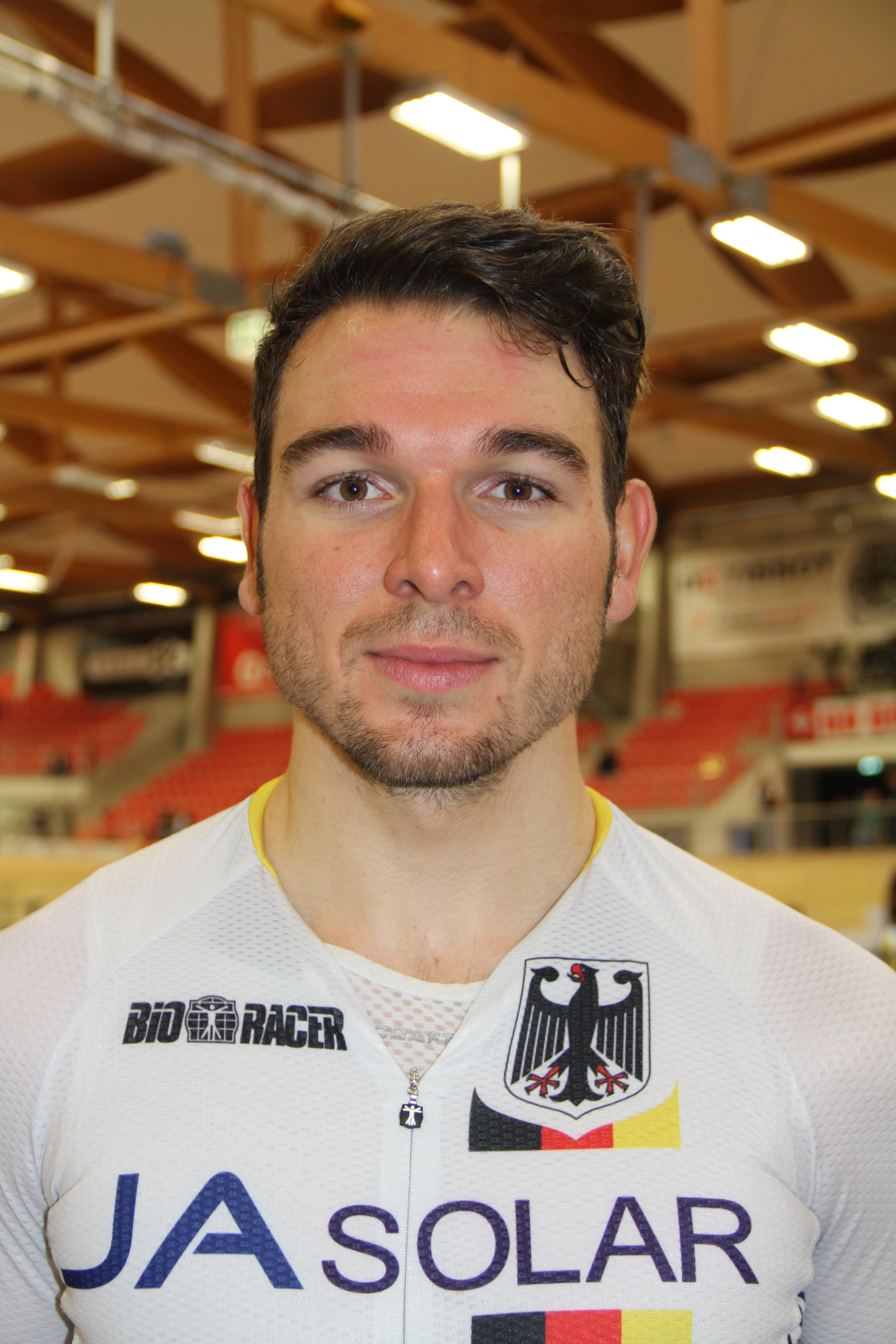
- Thiele at the 2015 UEC European Track Championships

Personal information
- Born: 29 September 1992 (age 34) Göttingen, Germany
- Height: 179 cm (5 ft 10 in)
- Weight: 75 kg (165 lb)

Cycling career
- Sport: Cycling
- Role: Rider

Kersten Thiele (born 29 September 1992) is a German professional racing cyclist. He rode at the 2015 UCI Track Cycling World Championships. He competed at the 2016 Summer Olympics as a member of the German men's team pursuit. The team finished in fifth place.
