= 2018 UCI Track Cycling World Championships – Men's points race =

Men's points race at the 2018 UCI Track Cycling World Championships
- Venue: Omnisport Apeldoorn
- Location: Apeldoorn, Netherlands
- Dates: 2 March
- Competitors: 22 from 22 nations
- Winning points: 70

Medalists
gold medal	Cameron Meyer	Australia
silver medal	Jan-Willem van Schip	Netherlands
bronze medal	Mark Stewart	Great Britain

The men's points race competition at the 2018 UCI Track Cycling World Championships was held on 2 March 2018 at the Omnisport Apeldoorn in Apeldoorn, Netherlands.

== Results ==
160 laps (40 km) were raced with 16 sprints.

Rank	Name	Nation	Lap points	Sprint points	Total points
1st place, gold medalist(s)	Cameron Meyer	Australia	40	30	70
2nd place, silver medalist(s)	Jan-Willem van Schip	Netherlands	20	32	52
3rd place, bronze medalist(s)	Mark Stewart	Great Britain	40	9	49
4	Cheung King Lok	Hong Kong	40	8	48
5	Kenny De Ketele	Belgium	40	6	46
6	Andreas Graf	Austria	40	2	42
7	Christos Volikakis	Greece	20	20	40
8	Eloy Teruel	Spain	20	18	38
9	Regan Gough	New Zealand	20	12	32
10	Liam Bertazzo	Italy	20	4	24
11	Mark Downey	Ireland	20	0	20
12	Morgan Kneisky	France	0	10	10
13	Alan Banaszek	Poland	0	9	9
14	João Matias	Portugal	0	6	7
15	Vitaliy Hryniv	Ukraine	0	6	7
16	Cyrille Thièry	Switzerland	0	5	5
17	Krisztián Lovassy	Hungary	0	4	4
18	Raman Ramanau	Belarus	0	3	3
19	Eric Young	United States	0	1	1
20	Denis Nekrasov	Russia	−20	2	−18
21	Andrej Strmiska	Slovakia	−20	0	−20
–	Jan Kraus	Czech Republic	−20	DNF	
–	Maximilian Beyer	Germany	DNS		
