= 2016 UEC European Track Championships – Men's team pursuit =

Men's team pursuit at the 2016 UEC European Track Championships
- UEC European Champion jersey
- Venue: Vélodrome de Saint-Quentin-en-Yvelines, Yvelines
- Date: 19-20 October
- Competitors: 59 from 14 nations

Medalists
gold medal	Thomas Denis; Corentin Ermenault; Florian Maitre; Sylvain Chavanel; Benjamin Thomas	France
silver medal	Filippo Ganna; Simone Consonni; Francesco Lamon; Michele Scartezzini; Liam Bertazzo	Italy
bronze medal	Matthew Bostock; Oliver Wood; Kian Emadi Coffin; Mark Stewart; Steven Burke	Great Britain

The Men's team pursuit was held on 19-20 October 2016.

== Results ==
=== Qualifying ===
The fastest 8 teams qualify for the first round, from which the top 4 remain in contention for the gold medal final and the other 4 for the bronze medal final.

Rank	Name	Nation	Time	Notes
1	Thomas Denis; Corentin Ermenault; Florian Maitre; Benjamin Thomas	France	4:00.108	Q
2	Niklas Larsen; Frederik Rodenberg Madsen; Casper Pedersen; Casper von Folsach	Denmark	4:01.055	Q
3	Liam Bertazzo; Simone Consonni; Francesco Lamon; Michele Scartezzini	Italy	4:01.197	Q
4	Alexey Kurbatov; Viktor Manakov; Sergey Shilov; Dmitry Sokolov	Russia	4:01.713	Q
5	Dion Beukeboom; Roy Eefting; Roy Pieters; Jan-Willem Van Schip	Netherlands	4:02.559	q
6	Matthew Bostock; Steven Burke; Kian Emadi Coffin; Mark Stewart	Great Britain	4:03.021	q
7	Kenny De Ketele; Moreno De Pauw; Lindsay De Vylder; Robbe Ghys	Belgium	4:04.467	q
8	Dawid Czubak; Szymon Sajnok; Daniel Staniszewski; Adrian Tekliński	Poland	4:05.161	q
9	Xavier Cañellas; Vicente García de Mateos; Sebastián Mora; Albert Torres	Spain	4:05.192	
10	Yauheni Akhramenka; Yauheni Karaliok; Mikhail Shemetau; Raman Tsishkou	Belarus	4:05.269	
11	Claudio Imhof; Gino Mader; Loïc Perizzolo; Gaël Suter	Switzerland	4:05.354	
12	Jasper Frahm; Leif Lampater; Lucas Liss; Sebastian Wotschke	Germany	4:06.902	
13	Vitaliy Hryniv; Volodymyr Kogut; Dmytro Ponomarenko; Volodymyr Fredyuk	Ukraine	4:10.106	
14	Michal Kohout; Jan Kraus; Nicolas Pietrula; Ondřej Vendolský	Czech Republic	4:13.008	

- Q = qualified; in contention for gold medal final
- q = qualified; in contention for bronze medal final

=== First round ===
First round heats are held as follows:
Heat 1: 6th v 7th qualifier
Heat 2: 5th v 8th qualifier
Heat 3: 2nd v 3rd qualifier
Heat 4: 1st v 4th qualifier

The winners of heats 3 and 4 proceed to the gold medal final. The remaining 6 teams are ranked on time, from which the top 2 proceed to the bronze medal final.

Rank	Heat	Name	Nation	Time	Notes
1	3	Liam Bertazzo; Simone Consonni; Francesco Lamon; Michele Scartezzini	Italy	3:57.564	QG
2	4	Thomas Denis; Corentin Ermenault; Florian Maitre; Sylvain Chavanel	France	3:58.261	QG
3	1	Matthew Bostock; Oliver Wood; Kian Emadi Coffin; Mark Stewart	Great Britain	3:57.945	QB
4	2	Dion Beukeboom; Roy Eefting; Roy Pieters; Jan-Willem Van Schip	Netherlands	3:58.465	QB
5	3	Niklas Larsen; Frederik Rodenberg Madsen; Casper Pedersen; Casper von Folsach	Denmark	3:59.334	
6	4	Alexey Kurbatov; Viktor Manakov; Sergey Shilov; Dmitry Sokolov	Russia	4:00.094	
7	1	Kenny De Ketele; Moreno De Pauw; Lindsay De Vylder; Robbe Ghys	Belgium	4:01.800	
8	2	Dawid Czubak; Szymon Sajnok; Daniel Staniszewski; Adrian Tekliński	Poland	4:03.333	

- QG = qualified for gold medal final
- QB = qualified for bronze medal final

=== Finals ===
The final classification is determined in the medal finals.

Rank	Name	Nation	Time	Notes
Bronze medal final
3rd place, bronze medalist(s)	Matthew Bostock; Oliver Wood; Kian Emadi Coffin; Mark Stewart	Great Britain		
4	Dion Beukeboom; Roy Eefting; Roy Pieters; Jan-Willem Van Schip	Netherlands	OVL	
Gold medal final
1st place, gold medalist(s)	Thomas Denis; Corentin Ermenault; Florian Maitre; Sylvain Chavanel	France	3:57.594	
2nd place, silver medalist(s)	Filippo Ganna; Simone Consonni; Francesco Lamon; Michele Scartezzini	Italy	3:58.871	
