= 2019 UEC European Track Championships – Men's madison =

Men's madison at the 2019 UEC European Track Championships
- Venue: Omnisport Apeldoorn, Apeldoorn
- Date: 20 October
- Competitors: 36 from 18 nations
- Winning points: 52

Medalists
| gold medal | Lasse Norman Hansen; Michael Mørkøv | Denmark |
| silver medal | Yoeri Havik; Jan-Willem van Schip | Netherlands |
| bronze medal | Maximilian Beyer; Theo Reinhardt | Germany |

The men's madison competition at the 2019 UEC European Track Championships was held on 20 October 2019.

== Results ==
200 laps (50 km) with 20 sprints were raced.

| Rank | Name | Nation | Lap points | Sprint points | Finish order | Total points |
|---|---|---|---|---|---|---|
| 1st place, gold medalist(s) | Lasse Norman Hansen; Michael Mørkøv | Denmark | | 52 | 3 | 52 |
| 2nd place, silver medalist(s) | Yoeri Havik; Jan-Willem van Schip | Netherlands | | 37 | 1 | 37 |
| 3rd place, bronze medalist(s) | Maximilian Beyer; Theo Reinhardt | Germany | 20 | 17 | 10 | 37 |
| 4 | Morgan Kneisky; Benjamin Thomas | France | | 34 | 2 | 34 |
| 5 | Sebastián Mora; Albert Torres | Spain | | 20 | 5 | 20 |
| 6 | Simone Consonni; Elia Viviani | Italy | | 18 | 4 | 18 |
| 7 | Robin Froidevaux; Théry Schir | Switzerland | | 17 | 12 | 17 |
| 8 | Matthew Walls; Oliver Wood | Great Britain | | 13 | 13 | 13 |
| 9 | Andreas Graf; Andreas Müller | Austria | | 9 | 15 | 9 |
| 10 | Szymon Krawczyk; Daniel Staniszewski | Poland | | 2 | 11 | 2 |
| 11 | Iúri Leitão; Rui Oliveira | Portugal | | 1 | 8 | 1 |
| 12 | Kenny De Ketele; Robbe Ghys | Belgium | | 1 | 14 | 1 |
| 13 | Yauheni Karaliok; Raman Tsishkou | Belarus | | 0 | 16 | 0 |
| 14 | Mark Downey; Fintan Ryan | Ireland | –20 | 3 | 7 | –17 |
| 15 | Viktor Manakov; Sergey Rostovtsev | Russia | –40 | 5 | 9 | –35 |
| 16 | Volodymyr Dzhus; Vitaliy Hryniv | Ukraine | –40 | 2 | 6 | –38 |
| 17 | Daniel Babor; Jan Kraus | Czech Republic | –60 | 0 | 17 | –60 |
| 18 | Christos Volikakis; Zafeiris Volikakis | Greece | –80 | 0 | 18 | –80 |
