= 2021 UEC European Track Championships – Men's madison =

Men's madison at the 2021 UEC European Track Championships
- Venue: Tissot Velodrome, Grenchen
- Date: 9 October
- Competitors: 36 from 18 nations
- Teams: 18
- Winning points: 60

Medalists
gold medal	Yoeri Havik; Jan-Willem van Schip	Netherlands
silver medal	Kenny De Ketele; Lindsay De Vylder	Belgium
bronze medal	Iúri Leitão; Rui Oliveira	Portugal

The men's madison competition at the 2021 UEC European Track Championships was held on 9 October 2021.

== Results ==
200 laps (50 km) with 20 sprints were raced.

Rank	Name	Nation	Lap points	Sprint points	Finish order	Total points
1st place, gold medalist(s)	Yoeri Havik; Jan-Willem van Schip	Netherlands	40	20	9	60
2nd place, silver medalist(s)	Kenny De Ketele; Lindsay De Vylder	Belgium	0	56	1	56
3rd place, bronze medalist(s)	Iúri Leitão; Rui Oliveira	Portugal	20	29	4	49
4	Elia Viviani; Michele Scartezzini	Italy	0	37	8	37
5	Lev Gonov; Vlas Shichkin	Russia	20	14	7	34
6	Thomas Boudat; Morgan Kneisky	France	0	19	10	19
7	Roger Kluge; Alan Banaszek	Germany	0	11	2	11
8	Rhys Britton; Oliver Wood	Great Britain	0	8	5	8
9	Frederik Wandahl; Matias Malmberg	Denmark	0	7	3	7
10	Tristan Marguet; Claudio Imhof	Switzerland	0	6	6	6
11	Roman Gladysh; Vitaliy Hryniv	Ukraine	–20	3	13	–17
12	Daniel Babor; Denis Rugovac	Czech Republic	–60	5	11	–55
13	Erik Martorell; Sebastián Mora	Spain	–80	10	12	–70
14	Bartosz Rudyk; Daniel Staniszewski	Poland	–40	6	–	DNF
14	Yauheni Karaliok; Dzianis Mazur	Belarus	–40	0	–	DNF
14	Dimitrios Christakos; Zisis Soulios	Greece	–60	0	–	DNF
14	Itamar Einhorn; Rotem Tene	Israel	–40	0	–	DNF
14	Krisztián Lovassy; Gergő Orosz	Hungary	–60	0	–	DNF
