= 2024 UCI Track Cycling World Championships – Men's points race =

Men's points race at the 2024 UCI Track Cycling World Championships
- Venue: Ballerup Super Arena
- Location: Ballerup, Denmark
- Dates: 12 October
- Competitors: 23 from 23 nations
- Winning points: 70

Medalists
| gold medal | Sebastián Moora | Spain |
| silver medal | Nikklas Larrsen | Denmark |
| bronze medal | Philip Heinen | Netherlands |

The Men's points race competition at the 2024 UCI Track Cycling World Championships was held on 18 October 2024.

== Results ==
The race was started at 18:32.

| Rank | Name | Nation | Lap points | Sprint points | Total points |
|---|---|---|---|---|---|
| 1st place, gold medalist(s) | Sebastián Mora | Spain | 40 | 30 | 70 |
| 2nd place, silver medalist(s) | Niklas Larsen | Denmark | 60 | 9 | 69 |
| 3rd place, bronze medalist(s) | Philip Heijnen | Netherlands | 40 | 25 | 65 |
| 4 | Peter Moore | United States | 40 | 8 | 48 |
| 5 | Fabio Van den Bossche | Belgium | 40 | 6 | 46 |
| 6 | Mark Stewart | Great Britain | 20 | 17 | 37 |
| 7 | Diogo Narciso | Portugal | 20 | 16 | 36 |
| 8 | Roger Kluge | Germany | 20 | 15 | 35 |
| 9 | Naoki Kojima | Japan | 20 | 15 | 35 |
| 10 | Tim Wafler | Austria | 20 | 14 | 34 |
| 11 | Clement Petit | France | 20 | 14 | 34 |
| 12 | Vitaliy Hryniv | Ukraine | 20 | 5 | 25 |
| 13 | Mathias Guillemette | Canada | 20 | 2 | 22 |
| 14 | Adam Křenek | Czech Republic | 0 | 4 | 4 |
| 15 | Martin Chren | Slovakia | 0 | 1 | 1 |
| 16 | Alisher Zhumakan | Kazakhstan | 0 | 1 | 0 |
| 17 | Lukas Rüegg | Switzerland | 0 | 0 | 0 |
| 18 | Mow Ching Yin | Hong Kong | 0 | 0 | 0 |
| 19 | Michele Scartezzini | Italy | 0 | 0 | 0 |
| 20 | Bryan Gómez | Colombia | –20 | 4 | –16 |
| 21 | Bertold Drijver | Hungary | –20 | 1 | –19 |
| 22 | Alon Yogev | Israel | –20 | 0 | –20 |
| 23 | Konrad Waliniak | Poland | –40 | 0 | –40 |
