= 2017 Dutch National Track Championships =

Track cycling tournament

- Venue: Alkmaar, Netherlands
- Date(s): 20, 27–29 December 2017
- Velodrome: Sportpaleis Alkmaar

The 2017 Dutch National Track Championships were the Dutch national Championship for track cycling, organized by the KNWU. They took place in Alkmaar, the Netherlands on 20, 27, 28 and 29 December 2017

== Medal summary ==
Event	Gold	Silver	Bronze
Men's Events
Men's sprint	Matthijs Büchli	Harrie Lavreysen	Theo Bos
Men's 1 km time trial	Harrie Lavreysen	Sam Ligtlee	Carlo Cesar
Men's keirin	Matthijs Büchli	Jeffrey Hoogland	Carlo Cesar
Men's individual pursuit	Dion Beukeboom	Roy Eefting	Daan Hoole
Men's scratch	Roy Eefting	Jan Willem van Schip	Wim Stroetinga
Men's points race	Yoeri Havik	Jan Willem van Schip	Roy Pieters
Men's madison	Wim Stroetinga; Yoeri Havik	Dion Beukeboom; Jan Willem van Schip	Raymond Kreder; Ramon Sinkeldam
Women's Events
Women's sprint	Laurine van Riessen	Elis Ligtlee	Shanne Braspennincx
Women's 500 m time trial	Kyra Lamberink	Laurine van Riessen	Shanne Braspennincx
Women's keirin	Laurine van Riessen	Steffie van der Peet	Hetty van de Wouw
Women's individual pursuit	Amy Pieters	Loes Adegeest	Michelle de Graaf
Women's scratch	Kirsten Wild	Marjolein van 't Geloof	Lorena Wiebes
Women's points race	Marjolein van 't Geloof	Roxane Knetemann	Marit Raaijmakers
Women's madison			
