= Cycling at the 2019 European Games – Men's madison =

Men's madison at the 2019 European Games
- Venue: Minsk Velodrome
- Date: 29 June
- Competitors: 28 from 14 nations
- Winning points: 43

Medalists
gold medal	Robin Froidevaux; Tristan Marguet	Switzerland
silver medal	Jan-Willem van Schip; Yoeri Havik	Netherlands
bronze medal	Andreas Graf; Andreas Müller	Austria

The men's madison competition at the 2019 European Games was held at the Minsk Velodrome on 29 June 2019.

== Results ==
200 laps (50 km) were raced with 20 sprints.

Rank	Name	Nation	Sprint																				Laps		Total	Finish order
Rank	Name	Nation	1	2	3	4	5	6	7	8	9	10	11	12	13	14	15	16	17	18	19	20	+	−	Total	Finish order
1st place, gold medalist(s)	Robin Froidevaux; Tristan Marguet	Switzerland		2	3		3			2		5		2		5			1				20		43	6
2nd place, silver medalist(s)	Jan-Willem van Schip; Yoeri Havik	Netherlands	5			5	1		2	3	2	3		3	3	1				3		10			41	1
3rd place, bronze medalist(s)	Andreas Graf; Andreas Müller	Austria								5	5								5		2		20		37	8
4	Fabio Van den Bossche; Moreno De Pauw	Belgium	1	3		3				1	1			1	2	2	1	1	2	2	5				25	9
5	Rui Oliveira; João Matias	Portugal						2				2	2		5		2		3	1	1	6			24	2
6	Francesco Lamon; Davide Plebani	Italy				1	5	3	1				1				3			5	3				22	11
7	Raman Tsishkou; Yauheni Karaliok	Belarus							5			1		5		3		5				2			21	4
8	Mark Downey; Fintan Ryan	Ireland	3	1	2								5				5	2							18	5
9	Szymon Krawczyk; Wojciech Pszczolarski	Poland				2		1			3				1			3							10	7
10	Gleb Syritsa; Lev Gonov	Russia			5																	4			9	3
11	Roman Gladysh; Vitaliy Hryniv	Ukraine					2	5	3				3											20	–7	10
12	Daniel Babor; Luděk Lichnovský	Czech Republic		5																				40	–35	12
	Christos Volikakis; Zafeiris Volikakis	Greece	2		1																			20		DNF
	Illart Zuazubiskar; Óscar Pelegrí	Spain																						60		DNF
