= Cycling at the 2024 Summer Olympics – Men's Madison =

Men's Madison at the Games of the XXXIII Olympiad
- Olympic track cycling
- Venues: Vélodrome National de Saint-Quentin-en-Yvelines
- Date: 10 August 2024
- Competitors: 30 from 15 nations
- Teams: 15
- Winning points: 55

Medalists
1st place, gold medalist(s)		Iúri Leitão; Rui Oliveira	Portugal
2nd place, silver medalist(s)		Simone Consonni; Elia Viviani	Italy
3rd place, bronze medalist(s)		Niklas Larsen; Michael Mørkøv	Denmark

The men's Madison event at the 2024 Summer Olympics took place on 10 August 2024 at the Vélodrome National de Saint-Quentin-en-Yvelines.

== Background ==
This was the 5th appearance of the event after it was introduced at the 2000 Olympics.

== Competition format ==
A madison race is a tag team points race that involves all 16 teams competing at once. One cyclist from each team competes at a time; the two team members can swap at any time by touching (including pushing and hand-slinging). The distance is 200 laps (50 km). Teams score points in two ways: lapping the field and sprints. A team that gains a lap on the field earns 20 points; one that loses a lap has 20 points deducted. Every 10th lap is a sprint, with the first to finish the lap earning 5 points, second 3 points, third 2 points, and fourth 1 point. The points values are doubled for the final sprint. There is only one round of competition.

== Schedule ==
All times are Central European Time (UTC+2)

Date	Time	Round
10 August 2024	17:59	Final

== Results ==
Rank	Cyclist	Nation	Sprint																				Laps		Finish order	Total
Rank	Cyclist	Nation	1	2	3	4	5	6	7	8	9	10	11	12	13	14	15	16	17	18	19	20	+	−	Finish order	Total
1st place, gold medalist(s)	Iúri Leitão; Rui Oliveira	Portugal				5	3											2	5	5	5	10	20		1	55
2nd place, silver medalist(s)	Simone Consonni; Elia Viviani	Italy			5			5		5	5		2					1				4	20		3	47
3rd place, bronze medalist(s)	Niklas Larsen; Michael Mørkøv	Denmark	1	3							3	5		2	3		1				3		20		5	41
4	Aaron Gate; Campbell Stewart	New Zealand		2	1		2		5			3	3	1		3		3	3	3	2	2			4	33
5	Roger Kluge; Theo Reinhardt	Germany				3		1	1				5		5					1	1	6			2	23
6	Shunsuke Imamura; Kazushige Kuboki	Japan								3				5					2	2			20	20	6	12
7	Denis Rugovac; Jan Voneš	Czech Republic									2					5	5						20	20	8	12
8	Sebastián Mora; Albert Torres	Spain					5	3	3			2				2								20	12	-5
9	Oliver Wood; Mark Stewart	Great Britain			2				2				1	3	1		2							20	9	-9
10	Lindsay De Vylder; Fabio Van den Bossche	Belgium	3	1		2	1			2														20	10	-11
11	Thomas Boudat; Benjamin Thomas	France										1				1								20	13	-18
12	Sam Welsford; Kelland O'Brien	Australia	2		3	1		2			1				2									60	7	-49
13	Mathias Guillemette; Michael Foley	Canada																						40	DNF	
14	Raphael Kokas; Maximilian Schmidbauer	Austria	5																				20	80	DNF	
(Note: The Netherlands were disqualified after the race for “improper conduct and behavior that endangers another rider”, as van Schip had collided with British rider Oliver Wood.)	Yoeri Havik; Jan-Willem van Schip	Netherlands																							DSQ	
