= 2018 UCI Track Cycling World Championships – Men's scratch =

Men's scratch at the 2018 UCI Track Cycling World Championships
- Venue: Omnisport Apeldoorn
- Location: Apeldoorn, Netherlands
- Dates: 1 March
- Competitors: 23 from 23 nations

Medalists
gold medal	Yauheni Karaliok	Belarus
silver medal	Michele Scartezzini	Italy
bronze medal	Callum Scotson	Australia

The men's scratch competition at the 2018 UCI Track Cycling World Championships was held on 1 March 2018 at the Omnisport Apeldoorn in Apeldoorn, Netherlands.

== Results ==
The race was started at 19:53.

Rank	Name	Nation	Laps down
1st place, gold medalist(s)	Yauheni Karaliok	Belarus	
2nd place, silver medalist(s)	Michele Scartezzini	Italy	
3rd place, bronze medalist(s)	Callum Scotson	Australia	
4	Roman Gladysh	Ukraine	−1
5	Rui Oliveira	Portugal	−1
6	Wim Stroetinga	Netherlands	−1
7	Xavier Cañellas	Spain	−1
8	Christos Volikakis	Greece	−1
9	Andreas Müller	Austria	−1
10	Maximilian Beyer	Germany	−1
11	Adrien Garel	France	−1
12	Christopher Latham	Great Britain	−1
13	Marc Potts	Ireland	−1
14	Krisztián Lovassy	Hungary	−1
15	Tristan Marguet	Switzerland	−1
16	Maxim Piskunov	Russia	−1
17	Thomas Sexton	New Zealand	−1
18	Filip Taragel	Slovakia	−1
19	Robbe Ghys	Belgium	−1
20	Leung Chun Wing	Hong Kong	−1
21	Adrian Tekliński	Poland	−1
–	Yacine Chalel	Algeria	DNF
–	Jiří Hochmann	Czech Republic	DNF
