= 2019 UEC European Track Championships – Men's points race =

Men's points race at the 2019 UEC European Track Championships
- Venue: Omnisport Apeldoorn, Apeldoorn
- Date: 19 October
- Competitors: 22 from 22 nations
- Winning points: 98

Medalists
gold medal	Bryan Coquard	France
silver medal	Jan-Willem van Schip	Netherlands
bronze medal	Michele Scartezzini	Italy

The men's points race competition at the 2019 UEC European Track Championships was held on 19 October 2019.

== Results ==
160 laps (40 km) were raced with 16 sprints.

Rank	Name	Nation	Lap points	Sprint points	Finish order	Total points
1st place, gold medalist(s)	Bryan Coquard	France	80	18	2	98
2nd place, silver medalist(s)	Jan-Willem van Schip	Netherlands	60	33	3	93
3rd place, bronze medalist(s)	Michele Scartezzini	Italy	80	8	14	88
4	Christos Volikakis	Greece	60	25	4	85
5	Ethan Hayter	Great Britain	60	16	13	76
6	Matias Malmberg	Denmark	60	8	18	68
7	Vladislav Kulikov	Russia	40	15	1	55
8	César Martingil	Portugal	40	13	7	53
9	Cyrille Thièry	Switzerland	40	10	12	50
10	Mark Downey	Ireland	40	8	15	48
11	Bartosz Rudyk	Poland	40	5	11	45
12	Gerben Thijssen	Belgium	40	5	19	45
13	Óscar Pelegrí	Spain	20	13	5	33
14	Daniel Crista	Romania	20	5	8	25
15	Viktor Filutás	Hungary	20	2	6	22
16	Stefan Matzner	Austria	20	2	16	22
17	Raman Ramanau	Belarus	20	1	9	21
18	Nicolas Pietrula	Czech Republic	20		10	20
19	Vladiislav Shcherban	Ukraine	0		17	0
	Leon Rohde	Germany	0		22	DNF
	Martin Chren	Slovakia	–40		20	DNF
	Vitālijs Korņilovs	Latvia	–80		21	DNF
