= 2019 UCI Track Cycling World Championships – Men's points race =

Men's points race at the 2019 UCI Track Cycling World Championships
- Venue: BGŻ Arena
- Location: Pruszków, Poland
- Dates: 1 March
- Competitors: 23 from 23 nations
- Winning points: 104

Medalists
gold medal	Jan-Willem van Schip	Netherlands
silver medal	Sebastián Mora	Spain
bronze medal	Mark Downey	Ireland

The Men's points race competition at the 2019 UCI Track Cycling World Championships was held on 1 March 2019.

== Results ==
The race was started at 18:30. 160 laps (40 km), with 16 sprints were raced.

Rank	Name	Nation	Lap points	Sprint points	Total points
1st place, gold medalist(s)	Jan-Willem van Schip	Netherlands	60	44	104
2nd place, silver medalist(s)	Sebastián Mora	Spain	60	16	76
3rd place, bronze medalist(s)	Mark Downey	Ireland	60	7	67
4	Wojciech Pszczolarski	Poland	60	7	67
5	Liam Bertazzo	Italy	40	21	61
6	Vitaliy Hryniv	Ukraine	40	14	54
7	Kelland O'Brien	Australia	40	11	51
8	Mark Stewart	Great Britain	40	10	50
9	Kenny De Ketele	Belgium	40	10	50
10	Felipe Peñaloza	Chile	40	8	48
11	Raman Ramanau	Belarus	40	5	45
12	Florian Maitre	France	40	3	43
13	Muradjan Khalmuratov	Uzbekistan	40	0	40
14	Cyrille Thièry	Switzerland	20	11	31
15	Stefan Matzner	Austria	20	7	27
16	Park Sang-hoon	South Korea	20	5	25
17	Leung Ka Yu	Hong Kong	20	4	24
18	Thomas Sexton	New Zealand	20	1	21
19	Nicolas Pietrula	Czech Republic	20	0	20
20	Viktor Filutas	Hungary	0	3	3
21	Turakit Boonratanathanakorn	Thailand	0	0	0
22	Yacine Chalel	Algeria	−20	0	−20
23	Assylkhan Turar	Kazakhstan	−20	0	−20
