= 2016 UEC European Track Championships – Men's points race =

Men's points race at the 2016 UEC European Track Championships
- UEC European Champion jersey
- Venue: Vélodrome de Saint-Quentin-en-Yvelines, Yvelines
- Date: 22 October
- Competitors: 23 from 23 nations

Medalists
gold medal	Niklas Larsen	Denmark
silver medal	Kenny De Ketele	Belgium
bronze medal	Raman Ramanau	Belarus

The Men's points race was held on 22 October 2016. 23 riders participated over a distance of 40 km (160 laps), with sprints every 10 laps awarding 5, 3, 2 or 1 point to the first four (double in the final sprint); 20 points are also awarded/withdrawn for each lap gained/lost respectively.

== Results ==
Rank	Name	Nation	Sprint points	Lap points	Finish order	Total points
1st place, gold medalist(s)	Niklas Larsen	Denmark	23	60	4	83
2nd place, silver medalist(s)	Kenny De Ketele	Belgium	13	40	20	53
3rd place, bronze medalist(s)	Raman Ramanau	Belarus	16	20	1	36
4	Oliver Wood	Great Britain	13	20	5	33
5	Andreas Graf	Austria	12	20	11	32
6	Jan-Willem van Schip	Netherlands	11	20	6	31
7	Wojciech Pszczolarski	Poland	11	20	10	31
8	Michele Scartezzini	Italy	7	20	9	27
9	Dmitry Strakhov	Russia	6	20	13	26
10	Lucas Liss	Germany	3	20	7	23
11	Krisztián Lovassy	Hungary	1	20	8	21
12	Marc Potts	Ireland	11	0	2	11
13	Julio Amores	Spain	11	0	18	11
14	Thomas Denis	France	10	0	3	10
15	Vitaliy Hryniv	Ukraine	10	0	17	10
16	Anders Oddli	Norway	10	0	19	10
17	Claudio Imhof	Switzerland	6	0	12	6
18	Filip Taragel	Slovakia	6	0	14	6
19	Martin Bláha	Czech Republic	3	0	16	3
20	Rafael Silva	Portugal	1	0	15	1
–	Mher Mkrtchyan	Armenia	3	0	–	DNF
–	Sotirios Bretas	Greece	0	0	–	DNF
–	Nikolay Genov	Bulgaria	0	−20	–	DNF
