= 2019 UEC European Track Championships – Men's scratch =

Men's scratch at the 2019 UEC European Track Championships
- Venue: Omnisport Apeldoorn, Apeldoorn
- Date: 17 October
- Competitors: 23 from 23 nations

Medalists
gold medal	Sebastián Mora	Spain
silver medal	Christos Volikakis	Greece
bronze medal	Wim Stroetinga	Netherlands

The men's scratch competition at the 2019 UEC European Track Championships was held on 17 October 2019.

== Results ==
First rider across the line without a net lap loss wins.

Rank	Name	Nation	Laps down
1st place, gold medalist(s)	Sebastián Mora	Spain	
2nd place, silver medalist(s)	Christos Volikakis	Greece	
3rd place, bronze medalist(s)	Wim Stroetinga	Netherlands	
4	Yauheni Karaliok	Belarus	
5	Matthew Walls	Great Britain	
6	Bryan Coquard	France	
7	Simone Consonni	Italy	
8	Filip Prokopyszyn	Poland	
9	Maximilian Beyer	Germany	
10	Sergey Rostovtsev	Russia	
11	Fabio Van den Bossche	Belgium	
12	Felix English	Ireland	
13	Stefan Mastaller	Austria	
14	Lukas Rüegg	Switzerland	
15	Vitaliy Hryniv	Ukraine	
16	Matias Malmberg	Denmark	
17	Krisztián Lovassy	Hungary	
18	Edgar Stepanyan	Armenia	
	Iúri Leitão	Portugal	Did not finish
	Daniel Babor	Czech Republic	Did not finish
	Vitālijs Korņilovs	Latvia	Did not finish
	Martin Chren	Slovakia	Did not finish
	Daniel Crista	Romania	Did not finish
