= 2024 UEC European Track Championships – Men's points race =

Men's points race at the 2024 UEC European Track Championships
- Venue: Omnisport Apeldoorn, Apeldoorn
- Date: 14 January
- Competitors: 21 from 21 nations
- Winning points: 66

Medalists
gold medal	Niklas Larsen	Denmark
silver medal	Sebastián Mora	Spain
bronze medal	Oscar Nilsson-Julien	France

The men's points race competition at the 2024 UEC European Track Championships was held on 14 January 2024.

== Results ==
160 laps (40 km) were raced with 16 sprints.

Rank	Name	Nation	Lap points	Sprint points	Finish order	Total points
1st place, gold medalist(s)	Niklas Larsen	Denmark	40	26	4	66
2nd place, silver medalist(s)	Sebastián Mora	Spain	40	18	8	58
3rd place, bronze medalist(s)	Oscar Nilsson-Julien	France	20	25	6	45
4	Yanne Dorenbos	Netherlands	20	21	5	41
5	William Perrett	Great Britain	20	16	3	36
6	Diogo Narciso	Portugal	20	16	14	36
7	Felix Ritzinger	Austria	20	7	9	27
8	Vitaliy Hryniv	Ukraine	20	2	15	22
9	Daniel Crista	Romania	0	21	1	21
10	Bertold Drijver	Hungary	0	13	11	13
11	Adam Křenek	Czech Republic	0	10	2	10
12	Simon Vitzthum	Switzerland	0	7	7	7
13	Martin Chren	Slovakia	0	0	12	0
14	Robbe Ghys	Belgium	0	0	16	0
15	Michele Scartezzini	Italy	–20	4	13	–16
16	Alon Yogev	Israel	–20	0	10	–20
17	Benjamin Boos	Germany	–40	0	–	DNF
18	Bartosz Rudyk	Poland	–40	1	–	DNF
19	Gustav Johansson	Sweden	–60	0	–	DNF
20	Georgios Boutopoulos	Greece	–40	0	–	DNF
21	Vitālijs Korņilovs	Latvia	–20	0	–	DNF
