= 2023 UCI Track Cycling World Championships – Men's madison =

Men's madison at the 2023 UCI Track Cycling World Championships
- Venue: Sir Chris Hoy Velodrome
- Location: Glasgow, United Kingdom
- Dates: 8 August
- Competitors: 36 from 18 nations
- Teams: 18
- Winning points: 37

Medalists
gold medal	Jan Willem van Schip; Yoeri Havik	Netherlands
silver medal	Oliver Wood; Mark Stewart	Great Britain
bronze medal	Aaron Gate; Campbell Stewart	New Zealand

The Men's madison competition at the 2023 UCI Track Cycling World Championships was held on 8 August 2023.

== Results ==
The race was started at 19:44.

Rank	Riders	Nation	Laps points	Sprint points	Total points
1st place, gold medalist(s)	Jan Willem van Schip; Yoeri Havik	Netherlands	0	37	37
2nd place, silver medalist(s)	Oliver Wood; Mark Stewart	Great Britain	0	35	35
3rd place, bronze medalist(s)	Aaron Gate; Campbell Stewart	New Zealand	0	34	34
4	Lindsay De Vylder; Robbe Ghys	Belgium	0	32	32
5	Lasse Norman Leth; Michael Mørkøv	Denmark	0	28	28
6	Benjamin Thomas; Thomas Boudat	France	0	16	16
7	Roger Kluge; Theo Reinhardt	Germany	0	14	14
8	Sebastián Mora; Albert Torres Barceló	Spain	0	14	14
9	Elia Viviani; Michele Scartezzini	Italy	0	9	9
10	Rui Oliveira; Ivo Oliveira	Portugal	0	8	8
11	Felix Ritzinger; Maximilian Schmidbauer	Austria	0	0	0
12	Shunsuke Imamura; Kazushige Kuboki	Japan	–40	3	–37
—	Alan Banaszek; Szymon Sajnok	Poland	Did not finish		
—	Denis Rugovac; Jan Voneš	Czech Republic	Did not finish		
—	Claudio Imhof; Lukas Rüegg	Switzerland	Did not finish		
—	Leung Chun Wing; Leung Ka Yu	Hong Kong	Did not finish		
—	Gavin Hoover; Colby Lange	United States	Did not finish		
—	Dylan Bibic; Mathias Guillemette	Canada	Did not finish		
