= 2015 UEC European Track Championships – Men's scratch =

Men's scratch race at the 2015 UEC European Track Championships
- UEC European Champion jersey
- Venue: Velodrome Suisse, Grenchen
- Date: 15 October
- Competitors: 23 from 23 nations

Medalists
gold medal	Sebastián Mora	Spain
silver medal	Tristan Marguet	Switzerland
bronze medal	Adrian Tekliński	Poland

The Men's scratch was held on 15 October 2015.

== Results ==
Rank	Name	Nation	Laps down
1st place, gold medalist(s)	Sebastián Mora	Spain	
2nd place, silver medalist(s)	Tristan Marguet	Switzerland	-1
3rd place, bronze medalist(s)	Adrian Tekliński	Poland	-1
4	Wim Stroetinga	Netherlands	-1
5	Andreas Müller	Austria	-1
6	Andrey Sazanov	Russia	-1
7	Krisztián Lovassy	Hungary	-1
8	Matthew Gibson	Great Britain	-1
9	Benjamin Thomas	France	-1
10	Ioannis Spanopoulos	Greece	-2
11	Martyn Irvine	Ireland	-2
12	Ivo Oliveira	Portugal	-2
13	Ahmet Örken	Turkey	-2
14	Otto Vergaerde	Belgium	-2
15	Alexander Perez	Norway	-2
16	Hardzei Tsishchanka	Belarus	-2
17	Lucas Liss	Germany	-2
18	Alex Buttazzoni	Italy	-2
19	Casper von Folsach	Denmark	-2
—	Stanislav Krastev	Bulgaria	DNF
—	Jiří Hochmann	Czech Republic	DNF
—	Mika Simola	Finland	DNF
—	Maksym Vasyliev	Ukraine	DNF
