= 2022 UCI Track Cycling World Championships – Men's points race =

Men's points race at the 2022 UCI Track Cycling World Championships
- Venue: Vélodrome National
- Location: Saint-Quentin-en-Yvelines, France
- Dates: 14 October
- Competitors: 21 from 21 nations
- Winning points: 76

Medalists
gold medal	Yoeri Havik	Netherlands
silver medal	Roger Kluge	Germany
bronze medal	Fabio Van den Bossche	Belgium

The Men's points race competition at the 2022 UCI Track Cycling World Championships was held on 14 October 2022.

== Results ==
The race was started at 18:32.

Rank	Name	Nation	Lap points	Sprint points	Total points
1st place, gold medalist(s)	Yoeri Havik	Netherlands	60	16	76
2nd place, silver medalist(s)	Roger Kluge	Germany	40	27	67
3rd place, bronze medalist(s)	Fabio Van den Bossche	Belgium	40	24	64
4	Corbin Strong	New Zealand	40	22	62
5	William Perrett	Great Britain	40	21	61
6	Grant Koontz	United States	40	7	47
7	Gustav Johansson	Sweden	40	0	40
8	Wojciech Pszczolarski	Poland	20	14	34
9	Michele Scartezzini	Italy	20	7	27
10	Valère Thiébaud	Switzerland	20	2	22
11	Mykyta Yakovlev	Ukraine	20	2	22
12	Alon Yogev	Israel	20	1	21
13	Mathias Guillemette	Canada	0	16	16
14	Thomas Boudat	France	0	11	11
15	João Matias	Portugal	0	10	10
16	Iván Ruiz	Argentina	0	1	1
17	James Moriarty	Australia	−40	6	−34
18	José Muñiz	Mexico	−40	0	−40
19	Martin Chren	Slovakia	−60	0	−60
–	Lotfi Tchambaz	Algeria	Did not finish		
–	Jan Voneš	Czech Republic	Did not finish		
