= 2018 UCI Track Cycling World Championships – Men's omnium =

Men's omnium at the 2018 UCI Track Cycling World Championships
- Venue: Omnisport Apeldoorn
- Location: Apeldoorn, Netherlands
- Dates: 3 March
- Competitors: 24 from 24 nations
- Winning points: 111

Medalists
| gold medal | Szymon Sajnok | Poland |
| silver medal | Jan-Willem van Schip | Netherlands |
| bronze medal | Simone Consonni | Italy |

The men's omnium competition at the 2018 UCI Track Cycling World Championships was held on 3 March 2018 at the Omnisport Apeldoorn in Apeldoorn, Netherlands.

== Results ==
=== Scratch race ===
The scratch race was started at 14:41.

| Rank | Name | Nation | Laps down |
|---|---|---|---|
| 1 | Jan van Schip | Netherlands | |
| 2 | Eiya Hashimoto | Japan | |
| 3 | Daniel Holloway | United States | |
| 4 | Christos Volikakis | Greece | |
| 5 | Claudio Imhof | Switzerland | |
| 6 | Simone Consonni | Italy | |
| 7 | Benjamin Thomas | France | |
| 8 | Raman Tsishkou | Belarus | |
| 9 | Maximilian Beyer | Germany | |
| 10 | Ivo Oliveira | Portugal | |
| 11 | Szymon Sajnok | Poland | |
| 12 | Oliver Wood | Great Britain | |
| 13 | Campbell Stewart | New Zealand | |
| 14 | Albert Torres | Spain | |
| 15 | Lindsay De Vylder | Belgium | |
| 16 | Felix English | Ireland | |
| 17 | Tomas Contte | Argentina | |
| 18 | Niklas Larsen | Denmark | |
| 19 | Mamyr Stash | Russia | |
| 20 | Aidan Caves | Canada | |
| 21 | Ignacio Prado | Mexico | |
| 22 | Roman Gladysh | Ukraine | |
| 23 | Nicolas Pietrula | Czech Republic | |
| 24 | Leung Chun Wing | Hong Kong | |

=== Tempo race ===
The tempo race was started at 16:27.

| Rank | Name | Nation | Laps down | Total points |
|---|---|---|---|---|
| 1 | Ivo Oliveira | Portugal | 20 | 28 |
| 2 | Szymon Sajnok | Poland | 20 | 25 |
| 3 | Campbell Stewart | New Zealand | 20 | 25 |
| 4 | Ignacio Prado | Mexico | 20 | 25 |
| 5 | Simone Consonni | Italy | 20 | 23 |
| 6 | Mamyr Stash | Russia | 20 | 22 |
| 7 | Raman Tsishkou | Belarus | 20 | 21 |
| 8 | Maximilian Beyer | Germany | 20 | 21 |
| 9 | Roman Gladysh | Ukraine | 20 | 20 |
| 10 | Oliver Wood | Great Britain | 0 | 3 |
| 11 | Christos Volikakis | Greece | 0 | 1 |
| 12 | Benjamin Thomas | France | 0 | 1 |
| 13 | Aidan Caves | Canada | 0 | 1 |
| 14 | Jan van Schip | Netherlands | 0 | 0 |
| 15 | Niklas Larsen | Denmark | 0 | 0 |
| 16 | Daniel Holloway | United States | 0 | 0 |
| 17 | Felix English | Ireland | 0 | 0 |
| 18 | Claudio Imhof | Switzerland | 0 | 0 |
| 19 | Albert Torres | Spain | 0 | 0 |
| 20 | Lindsay De Vylder | Belgium | 0 | 0 |
| 21 | Tomas Contte | Argentina | 0 | 0 |
| 22 | Eiya Hashimoto | Japan | 0 | 0 |
| 23 | Leung Chun Wing | Hong Kong | 0 | 0 |
| 24 | Nicolas Pietrula | Czech Republic | 0 | 0 |

=== Elimination race ===
The elimination race was started at 18:52.

| Rank | Name | Nation |
|---|---|---|
| 1 | Szymon Sajnok | Poland |
| 2 | Jan van Schip | Netherlands |
| 3 | Simone Consonni | Italy |
| 4 | Claudio Imhof | Switzerland |
| 5 | Roman Gladysh | Ukraine |
| 6 | Raman Tsishkou | Belarus |
| 7 | Benjamin Thomas | France |
| 8 | Campbell Stewart | New Zealand |
| 9 | Mamyr Stash | Russia |
| 10 | Niklas Larsen | Denmark |
| 11 | Albert Torres | Spain |
| 12 | Ignacio Prado | Mexico |
| 13 | Eiya Hashimoto | Japan |
| 14 | Lindsay De Vylder | Belgium |
| 15 | Oliver Wood | Great Britain |
| 16 | Daniel Holloway | United States |
| 17 | Christos Volikakis | Greece |
| 18 | Maximilian Beyer | Germany |
| 19 | Tomas Contte | Argentina |
| 20 | Leung Chun Wing | Hong Kong |
| 21 | Aidan Caves | Canada |
| 22 | Felix English | Ireland |
| 23 | Ivo Oliveira | Portugal |
| 24 | Nicolas Pietrula | Czech Republic |

=== Overall ===
After all events including points race.

| Rank | Name | Nation | Lap points | Sprint points | Total points |
|---|---|---|---|---|---|
| 1st place, gold medalist(s) | Szymon Sajnok | Poland | 0 | 13 | 111 |
| 2nd place, silver medalist(s) | Jan-Willem van Schip | Netherlands | 0 | 15 | 107 |
| 3rd place, bronze medalist(s) | Simone Consonni | Italy | 0 | 6 | 104 |
| 4 | Ivo Oliveira | Portugal | 20 | 11 | 94 |
| 5 | Campbell Stewart | New Zealand | 0 | 15 | 93 |
| 6 | Oliver Wood | Great Britain | 20 | 18 | 90 |
| 7 | Raman Tsishkou | Belarus | 0 | 3 | 87 |
| 8 | Niklas Larsen | Denmark | 40 | 6 | 86 |
| 9 | Benjamin Thomas | France | 0 | 9 | 83 |
| 10 | Eiya Hashimoto | Japan | 20 | 7 | 82 |
| 11 | Claudio Imhof | Switzerland | 0 | 0 | 72 |
| 12 | Christos Volikakis | Greece | 0 | 3 | 65 |
| 13 | Albert Torres | Spain | 20 | 6 | 64 |
| 14 | Ignacio Prado | Mexico | 0 | 6 | 59 |
| 15 | Maximilian Beyer | Germany | 0 | 2 | 58 |
| 16 | Mamyr Stash | Russia | 0 | 0 | 58 |
| 17 | Roman Gladysh | Ukraine | 0 | 0 | 57 |
| 18 | Daniel Holloway | United States | 0 | 1 | 57 |
| 19 | Felix English | Ireland | 20 | 0 | 39 |
| 20 | Lindsay De Vylder | Belgium | 0 | 0 | 28 |
| 21 | Aidan Caves | Canada | 0 | 0 | 19 |
| 22 | Tomas Contte | Argentina | 0 | 0 | 13 |
| 23 | Leung Chun Wing | Hong Kong | 0 | 0 | 4 |
| 23 | Nicolas Pietrula | Czech Republic | −20 | 0 | −17 |
