= Carlos Salgueiro =

Portuguese cyclist

Personal information
- Full name: Carlos Miguel Salgueiro
- Born: 9 June 1999 (age 27) Lisbon, Portugal
- Height: 1.83 m (6 ft 0 in)
- Weight: 68 kg (150 lb)

Cycling career
- Sport: Cycling
- Current team: Team Tavira / Crédito Agrícola
- Disciplines: Road, Track, Cyclo-cross
- Role: Rider

Professional teams
- 2020–2021: LA Alumínios / LA Sport
- 2022–: Atum General / Tavira / AP Maria Nova Hotel
Medal record
Men's track cycling
Representing Portugal
World Championships
| Bronze medal – third place | 2026 Shanghai | Points race |

Carlos Miguel Salgueiro (born 9 June 1999) is a Portuguese professional road bicycle racer, who rides for UCI Continental team Team Tavira / Crédito Agrícola. He won the bronze medal in the points race at the 2026 UCI Track Cycling World Championships.

== Career ==
Competing on the track, he won the individual pursuit at the 2026 Portuguese Track Cycling Championships in January 2026. In August 2026, he won the prologue at the GP Douro Internacional. In October, he won the bronze medal in the points race at the UCI Track Cycling World Championships in Shanghai, China.

== Major results ==
=== Road ===
2020
9th Road race, European Under-23 Championships
2021
2nd Time trial, National Under-23 Championships
2022
5th Time trial, National Championships
6th Clássica da Arrábida
2023
1st Stage 4 Grande Prémio Jornal de Notícias
4th Time trial, National Championships
2024
1st Stage 8 Grande Prémio Jornal de Notícias
2025
1st Memorial Bruno Neves
2026
1st Stage 3 Grande Prémio O Jogo
1st Prologue GP Douro Internacional
5th Time trial, National Championships
5th Overall Grande Prémio Jornal de Notícias

=== Track ===
2026
1st Madison (with Diogo Narciso), National Championships
3rd Points race, UCI World Championships

=== Cyclo-cross ===
2016–2017
1st National Junior Championships
2017–2018
1st National Junior Championships
2018–2019
2nd National Under-23 Championships
2019–2020
1st National Under-23 Championships
2020–2021
3rd National Championships
