= Michal Kohout =

Czech track cyclist

Personal information
- Born: 18 January 1996 (age 30)

Cycling career
- Sport: Cycling
- Discipline: Track cycling

Michal Kohout (born 18 January 1996) is a Czech male track cyclist, representing Czech Republic at international competitions. He competed at the 2016 UEC European Track Championships in the team pursuit event.
