= Oscar Nilsson-Julien =

French cyclist

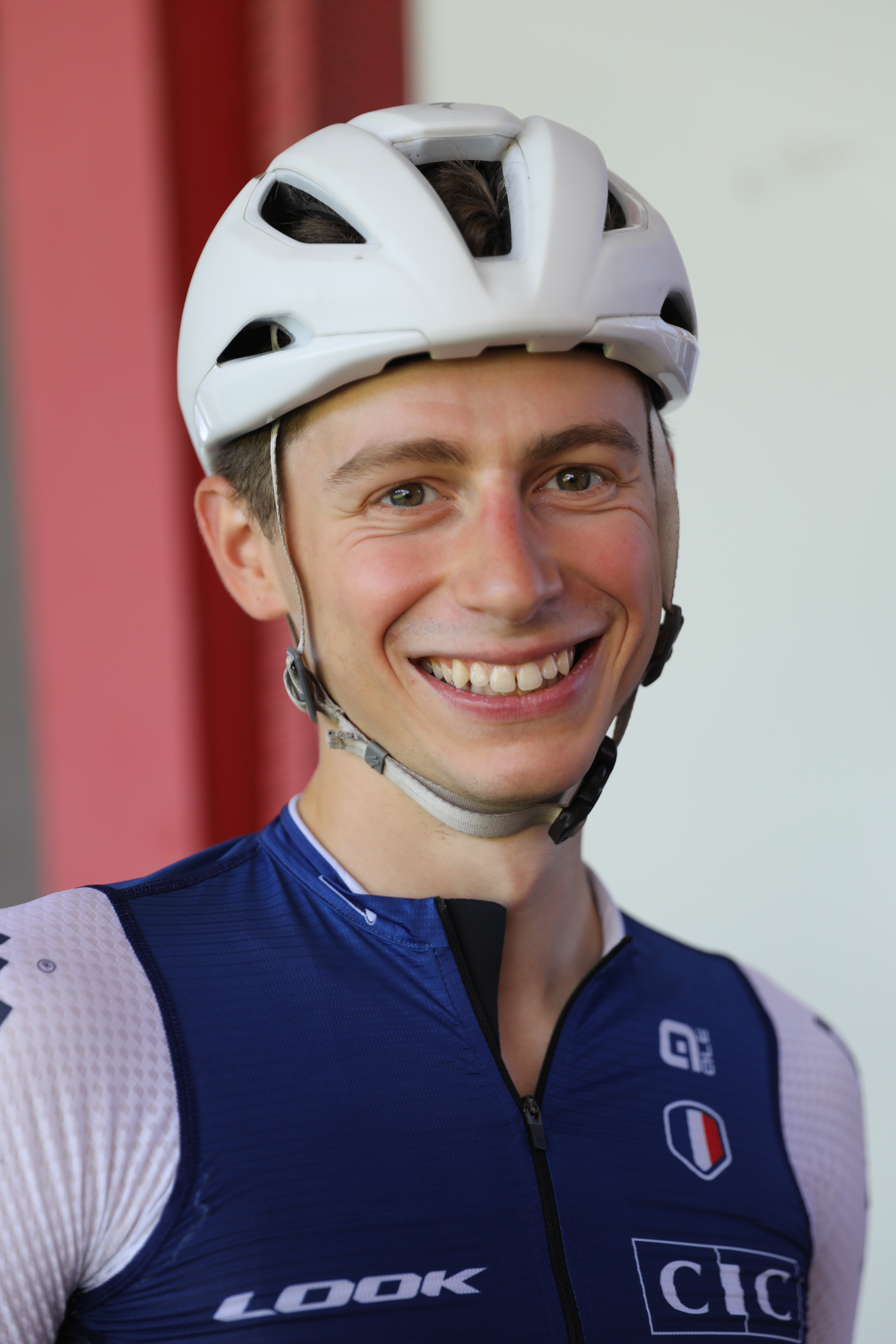
- Nilsson-Julien in 2024

Personal information
- Born: 10 January 2002 (age 24) Kentish Town, London, England

Cycling career
- Sport: Cycling
- Current team: AVC Aix-en-Provence
- Disciplines: Track; Road
- Role: Rider
- Rider type: All-rounder

Amateur teams
- 2019: VC Londres
- 2020: Fensham Howes–MAS Design
- 2021–2022: GB Cycling Senior Academy
- 2022: Team Inspired
- 2023–: AVC Aix-en-Provence
Medal record
Men's track cycling
Representing France
European Championships
Bronze medal – third place	2024 Apeldoorn	Points race

Oscar Nilsson-Julien (born 10 January 2002) is a French road and track cyclist and a member of the French Olympic track squad. He started out representing Great Britain as a junior and U23 rider. In 2023, he switched UCI nationality to represent France.

== Cycling career ==
Nilsson-Julien started riding at Herne Hill Velodrome in 2011, aged 9, joining the VC Londres cycling club. He raced for VCL between 2014 and 2020 and remains an honorary member.

He won the European U23 Omnium title at the 2022 UEC European Under-23 Track Championships. He was also the 2022 British Elite Omnium champion, taking the title at the 2022 British National Track Championships. In addition to this, he won silver medals in three other events at the 2022 British championships: in the points race, scratch and Madison.

In 2023, he finished second in the general classification at the U23 Vuelta a Hispania, winning the first stage and the team time trial stage in the process. Other road racing victories include winning the 2023 Chrono47 team time trial in the Coupe de France as well as victories at GP Getbeets, Aaarschot GP and Putte GP in Belgium. Results as a junior include ninth in the time trial at the 2019 UCI Junior Road World Championships and the team pursuit at the 2019 UEC European Junior Track Championships.

After changing to French nationality, he won the points race and finished second in the omnium at the 2024 French National Track Championships. He also took bronze in the points race at the 2024 European Track Championships in Apeldoorn. He also won a bronze medal in the 2024 French National Amateur Time Trial Championships as well as taking the 2024 Tour de la Mirabelle (UCI 2.2).

== Major results ==
=== Road ===
2019
1st Prologue Junior Tour of Wales
1st Cadence National Junior Road Race
2nd Overall Isle of Man Junior Tour
9th Time trial, UCI World Junior Championships
2022
9th Chrono des Nations U23
2023
2nd Overall Vuelta a Hispania

1st Stages 1 (TTT) & 2

2024
1st Overall Tour de la Mirabelle

1st Stage 4 Tour du Piemont Pyreneen
3rd French National Amateur ITT

=== Track ===
2019
1st Team pursuit, UEC European Junior Championships
1st Scratch, British National Junior Championships
2022
1st Omnium, UEC European Under-23 Championships
British National Championships

1st Omnium
2nd Points race
2nd Scratch
2nd Madison (with Jack Brough)

2024
French National Championships

1st Points race
2nd Omnium

3rd Points race, UEC European Championships

2nd Omnium, UCI Nations Cup, Hong Kong
