= Yoeri Havik =

Dutch cyclist (born 1991)

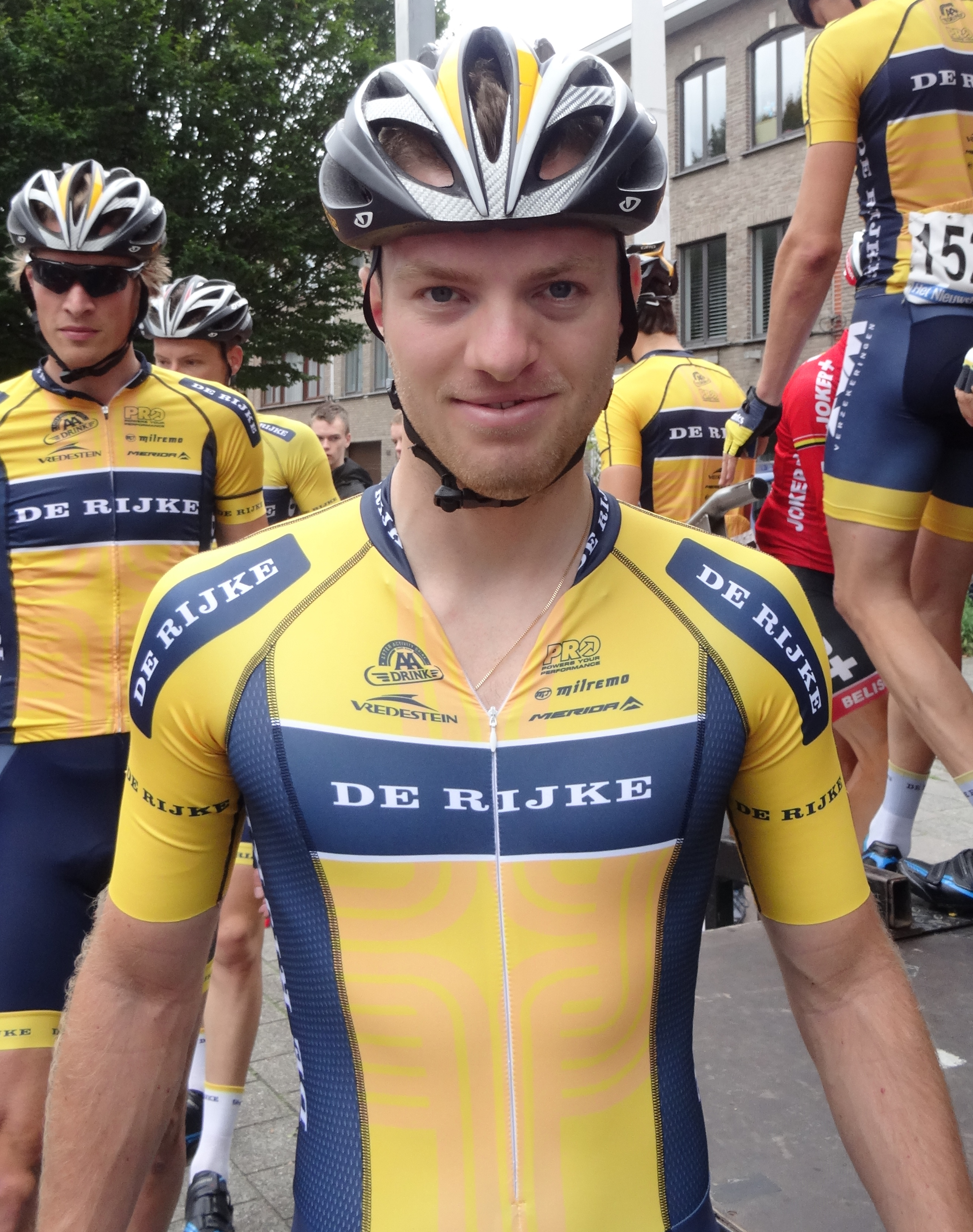
- Havik in 2014

Personal information
- Born: 19 February 1991 (age 35) Zaandam, Netherlands
- Height: 1.79 m (5 ft 10 in)
- Weight: 70 kg (154 lb)

Cycling career
- Sport: Cycling
- Current team: BEAT CC p/b Saxo
- Disciplines: Road; Track
- Role: Rider

Professional teams
- 2010–2014: Van Vliet–EBH Elshof
- 2015: SEG Racing
- 2016: Team3M
- 2017: Team Raleigh–GAC
- 2018–2020: Vlasman Cycling Team
- 2021–: BEAT Cycling

Major wins
- Track World Championships Madison (2023) Points race (2022)
Medal record
Men's track cycling
Representing the Netherlands
World Championships
Gold medal – first place	2022 Saint-Quentin-en-Yvelines	Points race
Gold medal – first place	2023 Glasgow	Madison
Bronze medal – third place	2025 Santiago	Elimination
European Games
Silver medal – second place	2019 Minsk	Madison
European Championships
Gold medal – first place	2021 Grenchen	Madison
Silver medal – second place	2019 Apeldoorn	Madison

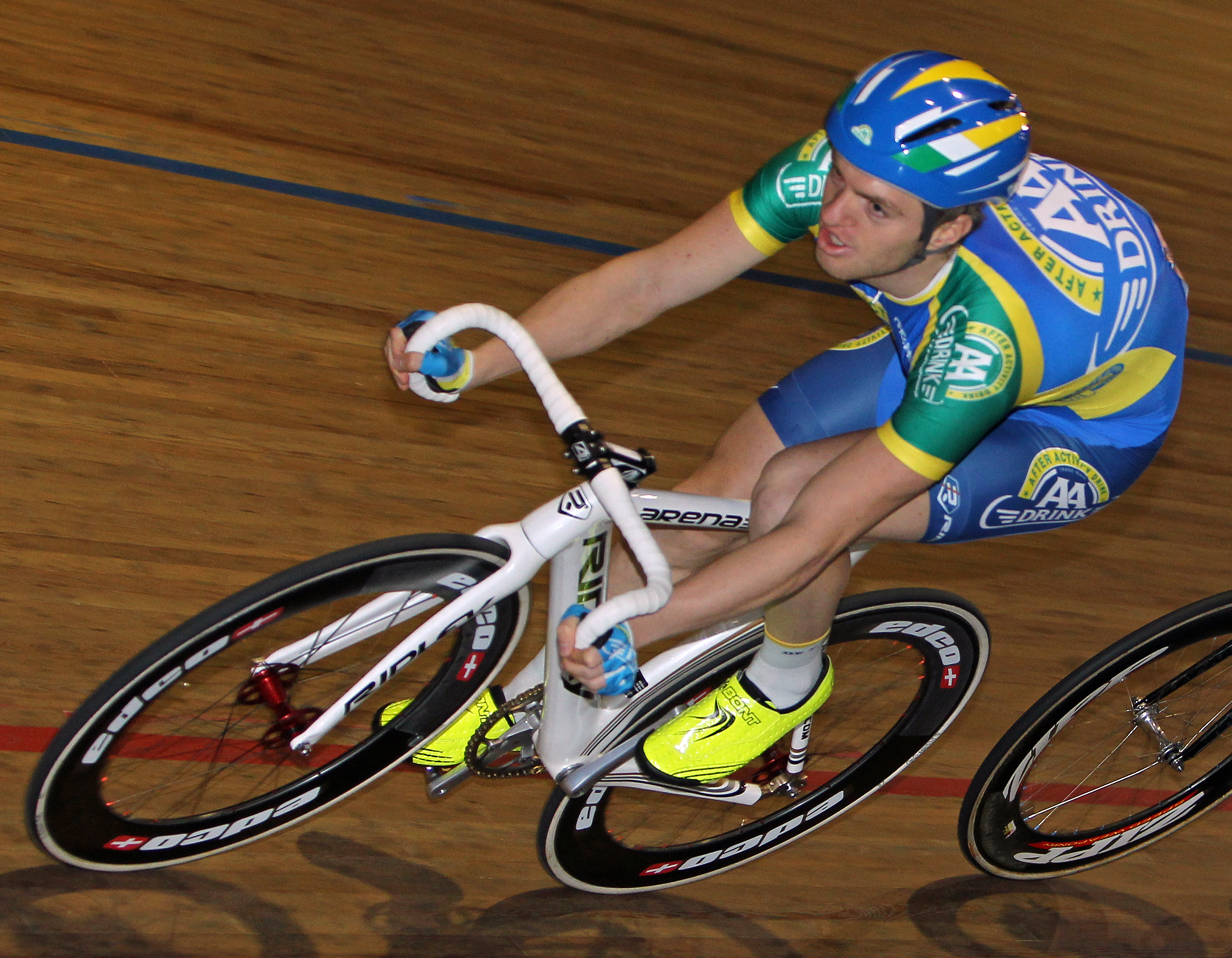
Photo by Rob Duin: Yoeri Havik on the track in 2013

Yoeri Havik (born 19 February 1991) is a Dutch cyclist, who currently rides for UCI Continental team BEAT CC p/b Saxo.

== Major results ==
=== Road ===
2008
1st Omloop der Vlaamse Gewesten
8th Grand Prix Bati-Metallo
2009
5th Omloop Mandel-Leie-Schelde Juniors
5th Remouchamps–Ferrières–Remouchamps
2010
6th Dwars door het Hageland
7th Antwerpse Havenpijl
9th Nationale Sluitingsprijs
2011
4th Nationale Sluitingsprijs
4th Dutch Food Valley Classic
4th Ronde van Noord-Holland
5th Münsterland Giro
5th Omloop der Kempen
5th Dorpenomloop Rucphen
6th ZLM Tour
8th Schaal Sels
10th Ronde van Vlaanderen U23
2012
1st Stage 4 Tour de Normandie
3rd Omloop der Kempen
4th Antwerpse Havenpijl
5th Omloop van het Waasland
6th Trofeo Migjorn
2013
1st ZLM Tour
1st Himmerland Rundt
3rd Grote 1-MeiPrijs
4th Skive–Løbet
6th Ronde van Noord-Holland
8th La Côte Picarde
8th Riga Grand Prix
9th Trofeo Palma
9th Trofeo Migjorn
2014
1st Antwerpse Havenpijl
4th Zuid Oost Drenthe Classic I
6th Ronde van Midden-Nederland
7th De Kustpijl
9th Kampioenschap van Vlaanderen
10th Omloop van het Houtland
10th Trofeo Palma
2015
3rd Fyen Rundt
4th Ronde van Overijssel
7th Arno Wallaard Memorial
7th Ronde van Noord-Holland
10th GP Horsens
2016
3rd ZODC Zuidenveld Tour
2018
4th PWZ Zuidenveld Tour
4th Grote Prijs Jean-Pierre Monseré
9th Gooikse Pijl
10th Kampioenschap van Vlaanderen
2019
3rd Midden–Brabant Poort Omloop
9th De Kustpijl

=== Track ===
2007
National Junior Championships

2nd Points race
2nd Madison
2nd Individual pursuit

2008
National Junior Championships

1st Points race
1st Madison
2nd Individual pursuit

2009
3rd Madison, National Championships (with Barry Markus)
2010
2nd Madison, National Championships (with Barry Markus)
2011
1st Six Days of Tilburg (with Nick Stöpler)
2nd Madison (with Niki Terpstra), National Championships
3rd Madison, UEC European Under-23 Championships (with Nick Stöpler)
3rd Six Days of Amsterdam (with Nick Stöpler)
2012
3rd Six Days of Rotterdam (with Danny Stam)
2013
National Championships

1st Scratch
1st Derny

3rd Six Days of Rotterdam (with Nick Stöpler)
2014
National Championships

1st Madison (with Dylan van Baarle)
1st Derny

1st Six Days of Amsterdam (with Niki Terpstra)
2015
1st Madison, National Championships (with Dylan van Baarle)
2016
3rd Six Days of Berlin (with Nick Stöpler)
3rd Six Days of Rotterdam (with Niki Terpstra)
2017
National Championships

1st Points race
1st Madison (with Wim Stroetinga)

1st Six Days of Berlin (with Wim Stroetinga)
3rd Six Days of Bremen (with Jesper Mørkøv)
3rd Six Days of Copenhagen (with Wim Stroetinga)
3rd Six Days of Ghent (with Wim Stroetinga)
2018
1st Madison, National Championships (with Wim Stroetinga)
1st Six Days of London (with Wim Stroetinga)
1st Six Days of Berlin (with Wim Stroetinga)
2nd Six Days of Bremen (with Achim Burkart)
2nd Six Days of Copenhagen (with Moreno De Pauw)
2nd Six Days of Rotterdam (with Wim Stroetinga)
2019
National Championships

1st Points race
1st Madison (with Wim Stroetinga)

2nd Madison, UEC European Championships (with Jan-Willem van Schip)
2nd Madison, European Games (with Jan-Willem van Schip)
2nd Madison, UCI World Cup, Cambridge (with Roy Pieters)
3rd Six Days of Copenhagen (with Matias Malmberg)
3rd Six Days of London (with Wim Stroetinga)
3rd Six Days of Rotterdam (with Wim Stroetinga)
2020
1st Madison, UCI World Cup, Milton (with Jan-Willem van Schip)
1st Six Days of Rotterdam (with Wim Stroetinga)
3rd Six Days of Fiorenzuola (with Jan-Willem van Schip)
2021
1st Madison, UEC European Championships (with Jan-Willem van Schip)
National Championships

1st Elimination
1st Madison (with Cees Bol)
1st Points race
1st Scratch

2022
1st Points race, UCI World Championships
UCI Nations Cup

1st Madison, Milton (with Jan-Willem van Schip)
2nd Elimination, Glasgow
2nd Elimination, Milton

2nd Six Days of Rotterdam (with Niki Terpstra)
2023
1st Madison, UCI World Championships (with Jan-Willem van Schip)
2nd Six Days of Ghent (with Jan-Willem van Schip)
2024
3rd Three Days of London (with Ben Wiggins)
2025
1st Six Days of Bremen (with Nils Politt)
2nd Madison, UCI Nations Cup, Konya (with Vincent Hoppezak)
2nd Six Days of Ghent (with Jules Hesters)
3rd Elimination, UCI World Championships
