= Dmytro Ponomarenko =

Ukrainian cyclist

Personal information
- Born: 10 February 1991 (age 35)

Cycling career
- Sport: Cycling
- Discipline: Track cycling

Dmytro Ponomarenko (born 10 February 1991) is a Ukrainian male track cyclist, representing Ukraine at international competitions. He competed at the 2016 UEC European Track Championships in the team pursuit event.
