= 2026 UCI Track Cycling World Championships – Men's points race =

Men's points race at the 2026 UCI Track Cycling World Championships
- Venue: Shanghai Velodrome
- Location: Shanghai, China
- Dates: 16 October
- Competitors: 24 from 24 nations
- Winning points: 35

Medalists
gold medal	Mark Stewart	Great Britain
silver medal	Benjamin Thomas	France
bronze medal	Carlos Salgueiro	Portugal

The Men's points race competition at the 2026 UCI Track Cycling World Championships was held on 16 October 2026.

== Results ==
160 laps (40 km) were raced with 16 sprints.

Rank	Name	Nation	Lap points	Sprint points	Finish order	Total points
1st place, gold medalist(s)	Mark Stewart	Great Britain	0	35	2	35
2nd place, silver medalist(s)	Benjamin Thomas	France	0	28	4	28
3rd place, bronze medalist(s)	Carlos Salgueiro	Portugal	0	27	5	27
4	Carl-Frederik Bévort	Denmark	0	25	1	25
5	Li Ni	China	0	12	3	12
6	Moritz Augenstein	Germany	0	9	16	9
7	Niccolò Galli	Italy	0	8	6	8
8	Alan Banaszek	Poland	0	6	17	6
9	Noah Bögli	Switzerland	0	5	9	5
10	Heimo Fugger	Austria	0	4	12	4
11	Jules Hesters	Belgium	0	3	10	3
12	Naoki Kojima	Japan	0	1	8	1
13	Vincent Hoppezak	Netherlands	0	0	13	0
14	Vlas Shichkin	Individual Neutral Athletes	0	0	19	0
15	Peter Moore	United States	−20	5	7	−15
16	Héctor Álvarez	Spain	−20	5	15	−15
17	Liam Walsh	Australia	−20	5	18	−15
18	George Jackson	New Zealand	−20	3	11	−17
19	Milan Kadlec	Czechia	−20	1	14	−19
20	Red Walters	Grenada	−40	5	–	DNF
20	Gabriel Nava	Mexico	−40	0	–	DNF
20	Dmitriy Noskov	Kazakhstan	−40	0	–	DNF
20	Sergey Rostovtsev	Uzbekistan	−40	0	–	DNF
	Ramazan Yılmaz	Turkey	−40	0	–	ABD
