= Óscar Pelegrí =

Spanish cyclist (born 1994)

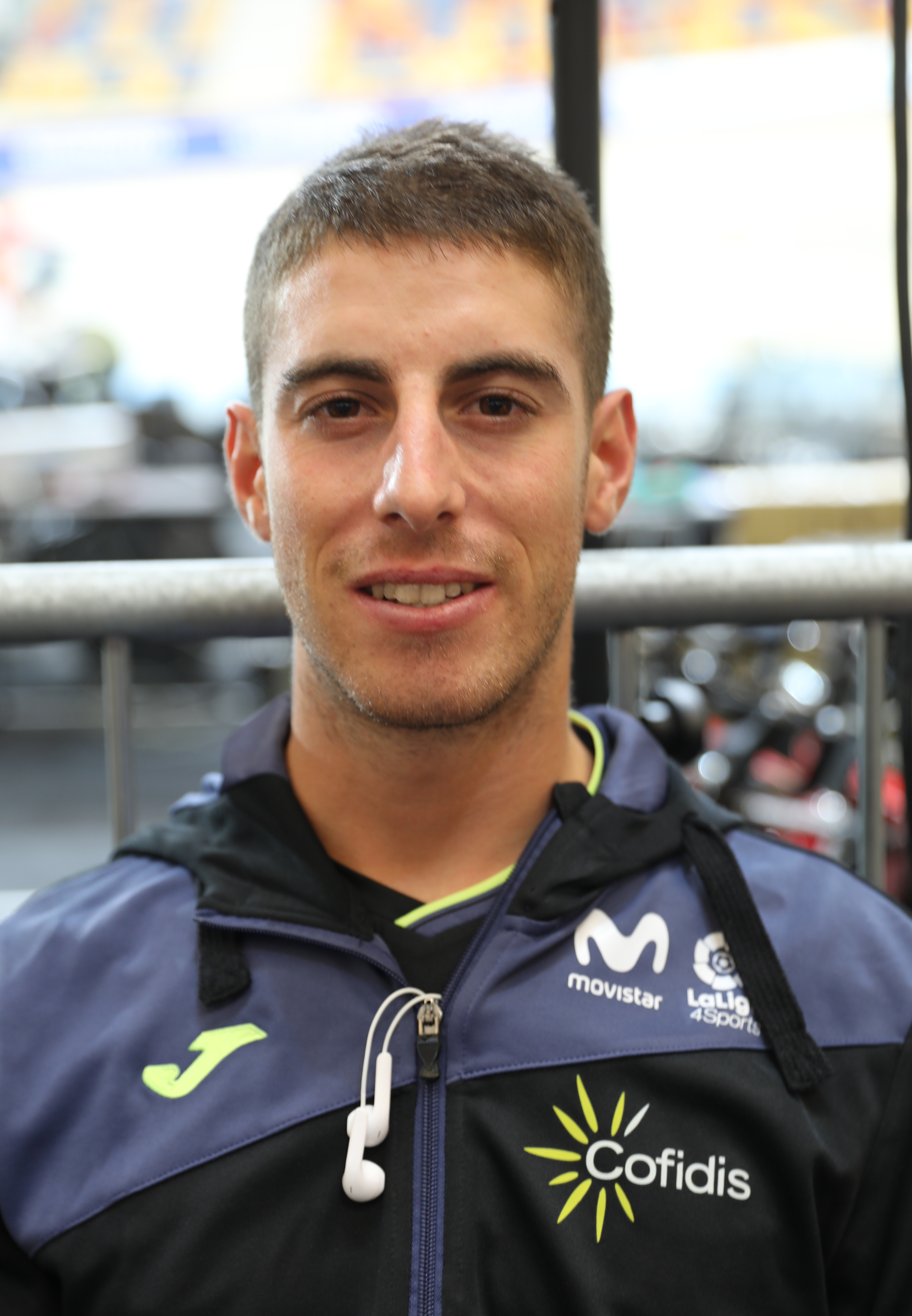
- Pelegrí in 2019

Personal information
- Full name: Óscar Pelegrí Ferrandis
- Born: 30 May 1994 (age 32) Betxí, Spain
- Height: 1.75 m (5 ft 9 in)
- Weight: 63 kg (139 lb)

Cycling career
- Sport: Cycling
- Current team: Retired
- Disciplines: Road; Track
- Role: Rider

Amateur teams
- 2013: Koplad–Uni2
- 2014: GSport–Valencia Terra i Mar
- 2015: Mutua de Levante–Valencia Terra y Mar
- 2016: Seguros Bilbao
- 2017: Caja Rural–Seguros RGA amateur

Professional teams
- 2016: Amore & Vita–Selle SMP (stagiaire)
- 2017: Caja Rural–Seguros RGA (stagiaire)
- 2018: Rádio Popular–Boavista
- 2019–2020: Vito–Feirense–PNB
- 2021: Electro Hiper Europa
- 2022–2024: Burgos BH

Óscar Pelegrí Ferrandis (born 30 May 1994) is a Spanish former road and track cyclist, who competed as a professional from 2018 to 2024. He competed at the 2019 UEC European Track Championships.

== Major results ==
2015
3rd Road race, National Under-23 Road Championships
2016
1st Road race, National Under-23 Road Championships
2017
National Track Championships

2nd Madison (with Sebastián Mora)
2nd Team pursuit

2018
National Track Championships

1st Madison (with Sebastián Mora)
3rd Team pursuit

1st Stage 3 Grande Prémio de Portugal N2
8th Clássica da Arrábida
2021
1st Stage 3 Tour de Bretagne
4th Overall Tour of Bulgaria
5th Overall In the Steps of Romans
5th Overall Okolo Jižních Čech
2023
1st Stage 1a (TTT) GP Beiras e Serra da Estrela
