= Robin Froidevaux =

Swiss cyclist (born 1998)

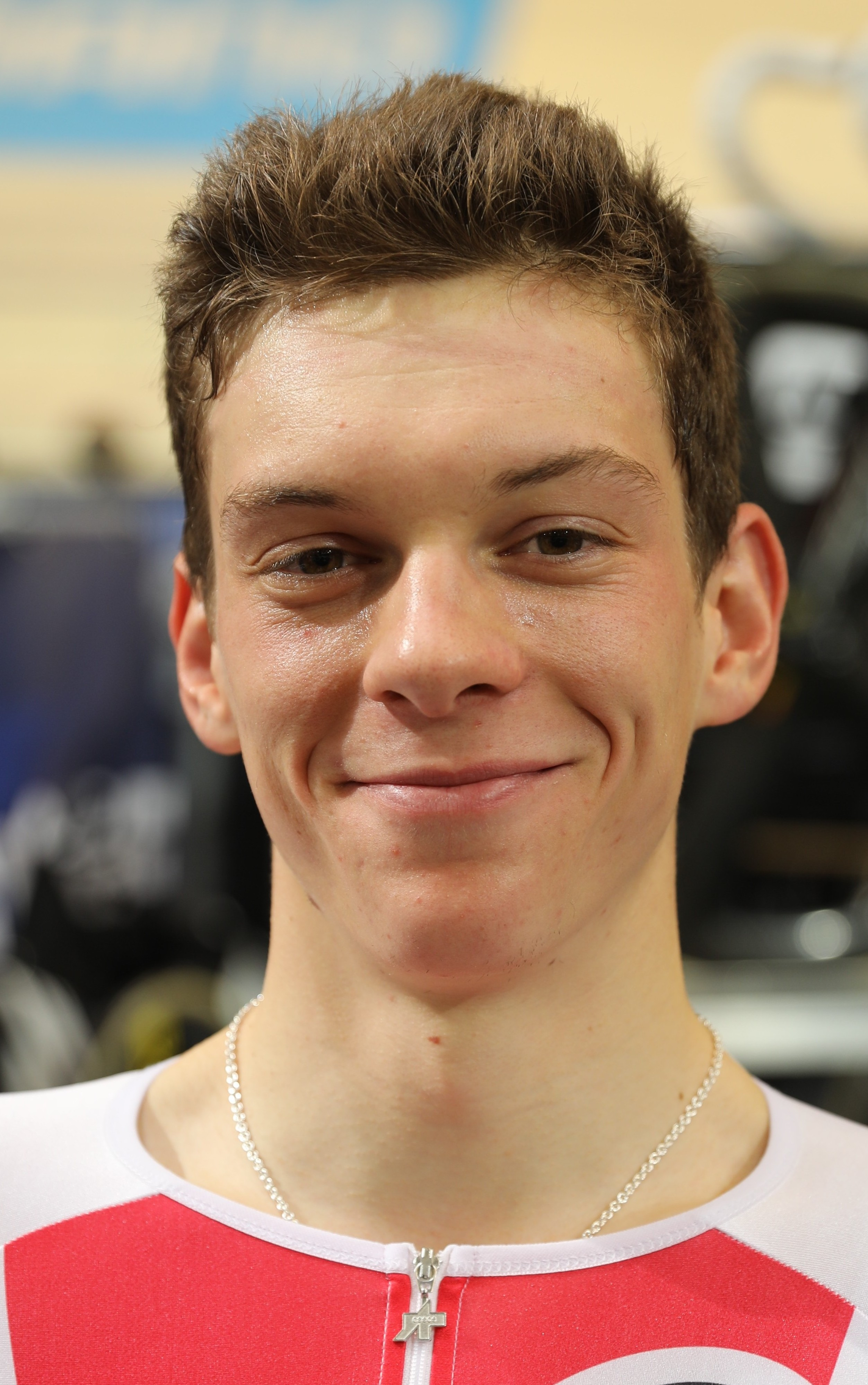
- Froidevaux in 2019

Personal information
- Full name: Robin Froidevaux
- Born: 17 October 1998 (age 27) Morges, Switzerland
- Height: 1.82 m (6 ft 0 in)
- Weight: 71 kg (157 lb)

Cycling career
- Sport: Cycling
- Current team: Tudor Pro Cycling Team
- Disciplines: Road; Track
- Role: Rider

Amateur team
- 2017: Roth–Akros Devo

Professional teams
- 2018–2020: Akros–Renfer SA
- 2021–: Swiss Racing Academy

Major wins
- One-day races and Classics National Road Race Championships (2022)
Medal record
European Games
Gold medal – first place	2019 Minsk	Madison
Bronze medal – third place	2019 Minsk	Team pursuit

Robin Froidevaux (born 17 October 1998) is a Swiss road and track cyclist, who currently rides for UCI ProTeam Tudor Pro Cycling Team.

== Major results ==
=== Gravel ===
2022
1st Serenissima Gravel

=== Road ===
2015
3rd Time trial, National Junior Championships
2016
2nd E3 Harelbeke Juniors
9th Road race, UEC European Junior Championships
2018
2nd Road race, National Under-23 Championships
2019
1st Stage 2 (TTT) Tour de l'Avenir
8th Road race, UEC European Under-23 Championships
8th Road race, European Games
10th Overall Tour du Jura
2020
2nd Team relay, UEC European Championships
3rd Time trial, National Under-23 Championships
6th Overall Orlen Nations Grand Prix
2021
5th Overall Tour d'Eure-et-Loir
2022
National Championships

1st Road race
4th Time trial

Istrian Spring Trophy

1st Points classification
1st Stage 3

9th La Roue Tourangelle

==== Grand Tour general classification results timeline ====
Grand Tour	2024
Giro d'Italia	136
Tour de France	—
Vuelta a España	—

Legend
—	Did not compete
DNF	Did not finish

=== Track ===
2015
2nd Team pursuit, UCI World Junior Championships
2016
1st Omnium, National Junior Championships
2017
2nd Madison, National Championships
3rd Team pursuit, UCI World Cup, Milton
2018
2nd Team pursuit, UEC European Under-23 Championships
2nd Omnium, National Championships
2019
European Games

1st Madison (with Tristan Marguet)
3rd Team pursuit

UCI World Cup

1st Team pursuit, Cambridge
3rd Team pursuit, Brisbane

National Championships

1st Omnium
1st Madison (with Théry Schir)

UEC European Under-23 Championships

3rd Madison (with Mauro Schmid)
3rd Team pursuit

2020
National Championships

1st Sprint
1st Madison (with Théry Schir)

2021
1st Madison (with Théry Schir), National Championships
