= Tristan Marguet =

Swiss cyclist (born 1987)

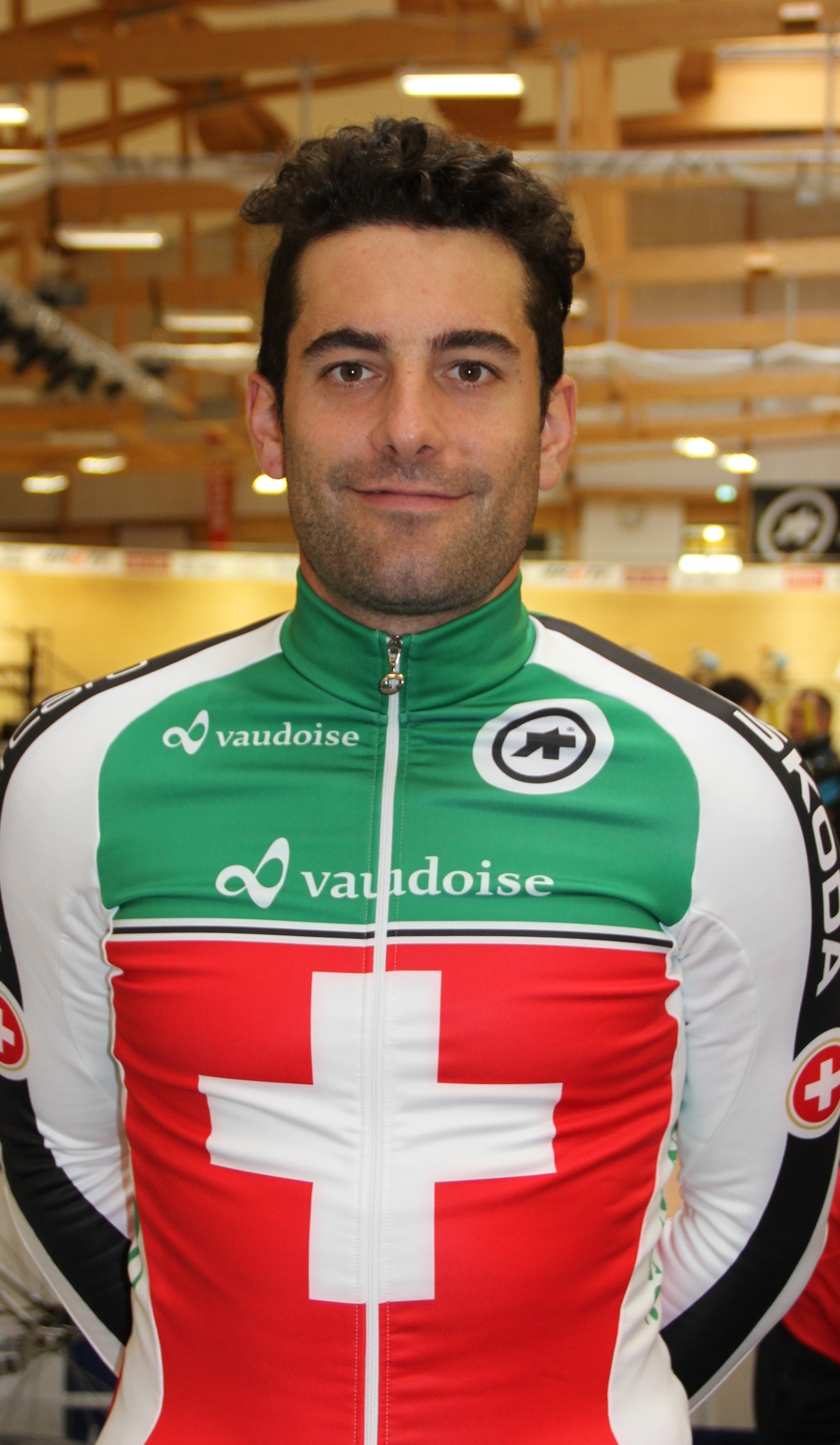
- Marguet at the 2015 UEC European Track Championships

Personal information
- Full name: Tristan Marguet
- Born: 22 August 1987 (age 39) Monthey, Switzerland

Cycling career
- Sport: Cycling
- Current team: RC Olympia Biel
- Disciplines: Road; Track
- Role: Rider

Amateur teams
- 2014: RC Olympia Biel
- 2017–: RC Olympia Biel

Professional teams
- 2011: Marco Polo
- 2015–2016: Roth–Škoda
Medal record
Representing Switzerland
Men's track cycling
European Games
Gold medal – first place	2019 Minsk	Madison
European Track Championships
Silver medal – second place	2015 Grenchen	Scratch
Bronze medal – third place	2018 Glasgow	Scratch

Tristan Marguet (born 3 November 1987) is a road and track cyclist from Switzerland. He competed at the 2010, 2011 and 2013 UCI Track Cycling World Championships. He won the silver medal in the scratch at the 2015 UEC European Track Championships in Grenchen, Switzerland.

== Major results ==
2009
1st Stage 4 Tour de Berlin
2015
2nd Scratch, UEC European Track Championships
3rd Ronde van Noord-Holland
2018
1st Stage 2 Tour of Black Sea
3rd Scratch, UEC European Track Championships
2019
1st Madison, European Games (with Robin Froidevaux)
