= Mark Stewart (cyclist) =

British bicycle racer

- Stewart at the 2026 Tour of Britain

Personal information
- Born: 25 August 1995 (age 31) Dundee, Scotland
- Height: 1.8 m (5 ft 11 in)
- Weight: 70 kg (154 lb)

Cycling career
- Sport: Cycling
- Current team: Modern Adventure Pro Cycling
- Disciplines: Road; Track
- Role: Rider

Amateur teams
- 2020: Vet4Farm (guest)
- 2020: Southland Cycling (guest)
- 2021: Trust House (guest)

Professional teams
- 2017: An Post–Chain Reaction
- 2019–2021: Ribble Pro Cycling
- 2022–2023: Bolton Equities Black Spoke Pro Cycling
- 2024–2025: Team Corratec–Vini Fantini
- 2026–: Modern Adventure Pro Cycling

Major wins
- Track World Championships Points race (2026)
Medal record
Men's track cycling
Representing Great Britain
World Championships
Gold medal – first place	2026 Shanghai	Points race
Silver medal – second place	2023 Glasgow	Madison
Silver medal – second place	2025 Santiago	Madison
Bronze medal – third place	2018 Apeldoorn	Points race
European Championships
Bronze medal – third place	2016 Yvelines	Team pursuit
Representing Scotland
Commonwealth Games
Silver medal – second place	2026 Glasgow	Elimination
Gold medal – first place	2018 Gold Coast	Points race

Mark Stewart (born 25 August 1995) is a Scottish road and track cyclist, who currently rides for UCI ProTeam Modern Adventure Pro Cycling. Representing Great Britain and Scotland at international competitions, Stewart is the 2026 World champion and 2018 Commonwealth Games champion in the points race, and a four-time medalist at the world championships. He won the bronze medal at the 2016 UEC European Track Championships in the team pursuit.

== Career ==
He was announced as part of the An Post–Chain Reaction team's squad for the 2017 season. In November 2018 it was announced that he would ride for Ribble Pro Cycling in the 2019 season.

Following the travel restrictions brought about by the COVID-19 pandemic in 2020, Stewart based himself in New Zealand, having been in the country to visit his partner Emma Cumming, following the 2020 UCI Track Cycling World Championships held in Germany. Due to this, Stewart competed in both the New Zealand National Track Championships in December 2020, and the New Zealand National Road Championships in February 2021. At the Track Championships, Stewart won a gold medal in the omnium, and a silver medal with Adrian Hegyvary in the madison; he also won a silver medal in the road race at the Road Championships, finishing behind George Bennett.

Stewart's 2022 season, with his new team Bolton Equities Black Spoke Pro Cycling, started with the New Zealand Cycle Classic where the team won the first stage a Team time trial by 22 seconds. Teammate Regan Gough held yellow going into Stage 2 where a group of 13 riders got an advantage of 15 minutes on the peloton Stewart was part of this group. By finishing second on the stage he moved in to the lead of the General classification. He managed to hold the lead all the way to the end even taking a greater lead overall by winning the uphill finish in stage 4. Stewart won the tour overall to win his first Stage race. In April 2022, Stewart won the British National Madison Championships with William Perrett.

On 4 July 2024, Stewart was name the travelling reserve on the Team GB men's track endurance squad for the Paris 2024 Olympic Games. He raced in the first two rounds of the team pursuit competition alongside Ethan Hayter, Ethan Vernon, Charlie Tanfield and Ollie Wood, together winning a silver medal. In the madison, he took the place of Hayter, who had withdrawn due to a thigh strain suffered in the team pursuit. Stewart partnered Wood, with whom he had medalled in the madison at the 2023 World Championships. They finished ninth after a difficult race in which Wood had a heavy crash that the Netherlands were later disqualified for.

In the 2025 UCI Track Cycling World Championships, Stewart won a silver medal in the madison partnering Josh Tarling.

Stewart won a silver medal in the elimination race at the 2026 Commonwealth Games. At the 2026 UCI Track Cycling World Championships, he became the world champion in the points race, after finishing seven points ahead of Benjamin Thomas.

== Major results ==
=== Road ===
2017
9th Grand Prix Criquielion
2021
2nd Road race, New Zealand National Championships
2022
1st Overall New Zealand Cycle Classic

1st Mountains classification
1st Stages 1 (TTT) & 4

1st Overall Tour of Romania
3rd Overall International Tour of Hellas
2023
2nd Per sempre Alfredo
3rd GP Industria & Artigianato di Larciano
2024
1st Sprints classification, UAE Tour
2025
1st Overall Tour de Kumano

1st Stage 3

4th Overall Tour of Japan

=== Track ===
2014–2015
1st Points race, National Championships
3rd Team pursuit, UCI World Cup, Cali
2015–2016
UCI World Cup

1st Scratch, Cambridge
3rd Madison, Cambridge (with Germain Burton)

National Championships

1st Team pursuit
1st Scratch

2016–2017
UCI World Cup

1st Team pursuit, Glasgow
3rd Madison, Apeldoorn (with Oli Wood)

1st Points race, Fiorenzuola d'Arda
3rd Team pursuit, UEC European Championships
2017–2018
UEC European Under–23 Championships

1st Individual pursuit
1st Omnium

UCI World Cup

2nd Points race, Milton
3rd Madison, Milton (with Oli Wood)

3rd Points race, UCI World Championships
2018–2019
1st Points race, Commonwealth Games
UCI World Cup

2nd Points race, Saint-Quentin-en-Yvelines
2nd Team pursuit, Saint-Quentin-en-Yvelines
2nd Madison, Milton (with Oli Wood)
2nd Madison, Berlin (with Oli Wood)
2nd Omnium, Milton
3rd Team pursuit, Milton

2nd Scratch, National Championships
2019–2020
UCI World Cup

1st Overall Points race
1st Points race, Minsk
2nd Omnium, Glasgow
3rd Madison, Hong Kong (with Fred Wright)

2020–2021
1st Omnium, New Zealand National Championships
2021–2022
1st Madison, National Championships (with William Perrett)
2022–2023
3rd Overall Endurance, UCI Champions League

1st Scratch, Palma
1st Scratch, London II
3rd Elimination, Palma

2nd Madison, UCI World Championships (with Ollie Wood)
2025–2026
2nd Madison, UCI World Championships (with Josh Tarling)
2026–2027
1st Points race, UCI World Championships
