= Raman Ramanau =

Belarusian cyclist

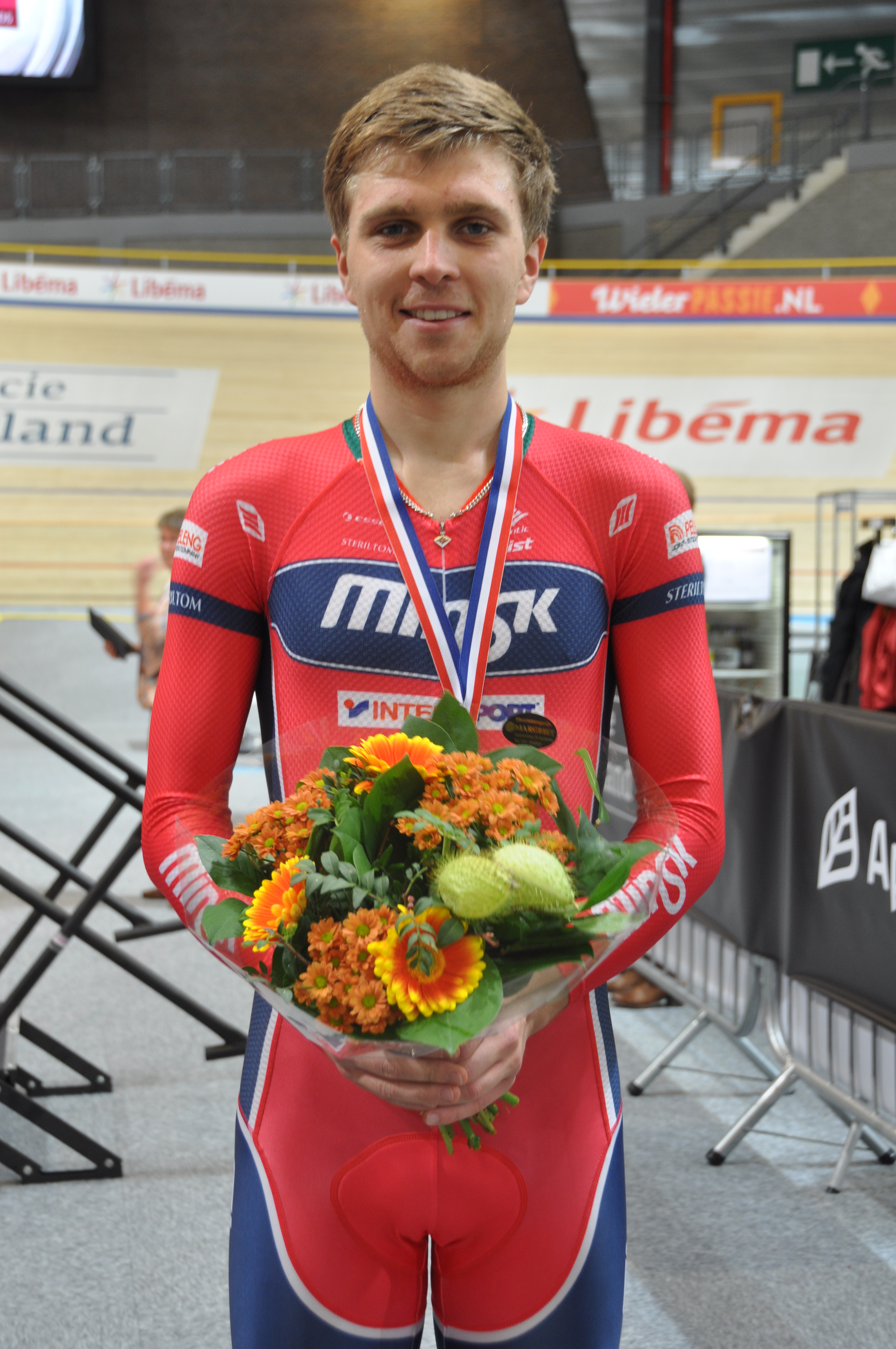
- Ramanau in 2016

Personal information
- Full name: Raman Ramanau
- Born: 3 July 1994 (age 32) Mazyr, Belarus
- Height: 1.78 m (5 ft 10 in)
- Weight: 68 kg (150 lb)

Cycling career
- Sport: Cycling
- Current team: BelAZ
- Disciplines: Road; Track
- Role: Rider

Professional teams
- 2015–2020: Minsk
- 2021–: BelAZ
Medal record
Representing Belarus
Men's track cycling
European Championships
Bronze medal – third place	2016 Yvelines	Points race

Raman Ramanau (born 3 July 1994) is a Belarusian professional racing cyclist, who currently rides for UCI Continental team BelAZ. He rode at the 2015 UCI Track Cycling World Championships.

== Major results ==
=== Road ===
2012
4th Overall La Coupe du Président de la Ville de Grudziądz
2015
6th Grand Prix of Moscow
2016
3rd Belgrade–Banja Luka I
7th Memoriał Andrzeja Trochanowskiego
2020
5th GP Belek

=== Track ===
2012
National Track Championships

2nd Team pursuit
2nd Scratch
3rd Omnium

2013
3rd Points race, UEC European Under-23 Championships
2014
1st Team pursuit, National Track Championships
3rd Scratch, UEC European Under-23 Championships
2015
UEC European Under-23 Championships

1st Points race
3rd Team pursuit

2016
1st Points race, 2016–17 UCI Track Cycling World Cup, Apeldoorn
3rd Points race, UEC European Championships
3rd Points race, UEC European Under-23 Championships
4th Scratch, UCI Track World Championships
2017
National Track Championships

1st Team pursuit
1st Madison
3rd Scratch

2018
1st Team pursuit, National Track Championships
