= Roy Pieters =

Dutch cyclist (born 1989)

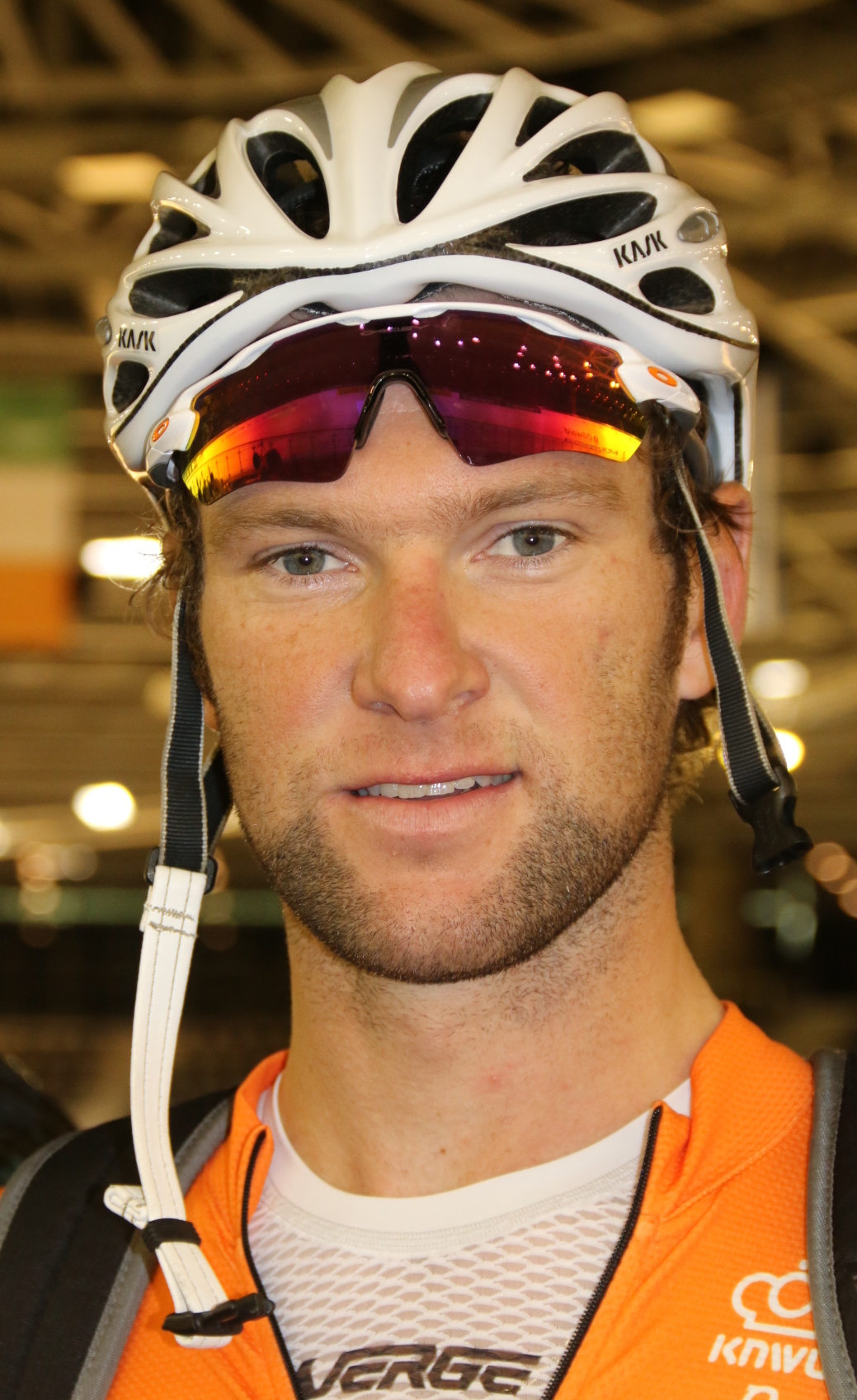
- Pieters in 2017

Personal information
- Born: 12 June 1989 (age 37) Haarlem

Cycling career
- Sport: Cycling
- Discipline: Track cycling

Roy Pieters (born 12 June 1989) is a Dutch male track cyclist, representing Netherlands at international competitions. He competed at the 2016 UEC European Track Championships in the team pursuit.
