= Wim Stroetinga =

Dutch cyclist (born 1985)

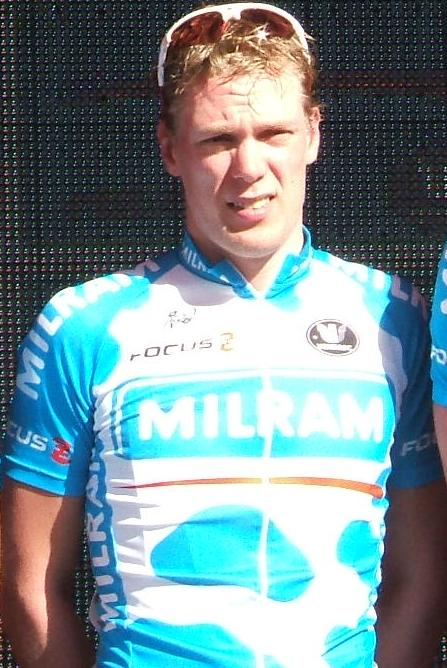
- Stroetinga at the 2009 Tour Down Under

Personal information
- Full name: Willem Stroetinga
- Nickname: Wim
- Born: 23 May 1985 (age 41) Drachten, Netherlands
- Height: 5 ft 9 in (1.75 m)
- Weight: 152 lb (69 kg; 10.9 st)

Cycling career
- Sport: Cycling
- Current team: Retired
- Disciplines: Track; Road
- Role: Rider

Amateur teams
- 2004: Netherlands Track
- 2008: Ubbink–Syntec Cycling Team
- 2011: Ubbink–Koga
- 2017: Vlasman Cycling Team

Professional teams
- 2005: Team Löwik Meubelen–Van Losser
- 2006: Fondas–P3Transfer Team
- 2007: Ubbink–Syntec Cycling Team
- 2009–2010: Team Milram
- 2012–2014: Koga Cycling Team
- 2015–2016: Parkhotel Valkenburg Continental Team
- 2018–2020: Vlasman Cycling Team
Medal record
Men's track cycling
Representing Netherlands
World Championships
| Silver medal – second place | 2007 Palma de Mallorca | Scratch |
| Silver medal – second place | 2008 Manchester | Scratch |
| Bronze medal – third place | 2012 Melbourne | Scratch |
European Championships
| Bronze medal – third place | 2016 Yvelines | Scratch |
| Bronze medal – third place | 2019 Apeldoorn | Scratch |

Willem Stroetinga (born 23 May 1985 in Drachten) is a Dutch former professional racing cyclist.

== Major results ==
=== Road ===
2005
1st Ronde van Midden-Nederland
1st Skara Grand Prix
1st Stage 3 OZ Wielerweekend
2nd Amicon-Van Keulen Omloop
3rd Tour de Monde
3rd Meeùs Race Lierop
4th Parel van de Veluwe
2006
1st Stage 4 Olympia's Tour
1st Stage 3 Ronde van Antwerpen
2nd Overall PWZ Zuidenveld Tour
2nd Dorpenomloop door Drenthe
3rd Omloop Schokland
2007
1st Stage 2a Ronde van Antwerpen
3rd Ronde van Noord-Holland
2009
2nd Down Under Classic
7th Neuseen Classics
8th Dutch Food Valley Classic
9th Ronde van het Groene Hart
2010
4th Nationale Sluitingsprijs
7th Trofeo Mallorca
2011
1st Appelscha
1st Ronde van Midden-Nederland
Olympia's Tour

1st Stages 2, 3 & 4

2nd Dutch Food Valley Classic
3rd Nationale Sluitingsprijs
2012
1st Nationale Sluitingsprijs
1st Stage 1 Olympia's Tour
3rd Overall Ronde van Overijssel

1st Stage 1

3rd Ronde van Haarlemmerliede en Spaarnwoude
2013
1st Stage 6 Olympia's Tour
3rd Kernen Omloop Echt-Susteren
4th Ruddervoorde Koerse
9th Ronde van Noord-Holland
10th Ronde van Limburg
2014
1st Zuid Oost Drenthe Classic I
1st Ronde van Midden-Nederland
2nd Overall Olympia's Tour

1st Points classification
1st Stages 3, 4, 5 & 6

2015
1st Himmerland Rundt
Olympia's Tour

1st Points classification
1st Stages 1b, 3 & 5b

2nd Zuid Oost Drenthe Classic I
3rd GP Viborg
2016
1st Stage 5 Ster ZLM Toer
3rd Road race, National Road Championships
2018
3rd Ronde van Noord-Holland
4th Fyen Rundt
5th Ronde van Midden-Nederland

=== Track ===
2002
1st Scratch, UCI World Junior Championships
2003
UEC European Junior Championships

1st Points race
2nd Team pursuit

National Junior Championships

1st Keirin
3rd Points race

2004
1st Scratch, National Championships
1st UIV Cup
2nd Team pursuit, UEC European Under-23 Championships
2nd Team pursuit, 04–05 UCI World Cup Classics, Moscow
2005
National Track Championships

1st Scratch
2nd Points race

04–05 UCI World Cup Classics

1st Scratch, Sydney
2nd Team pursuit, Moscow

3rd Scratch, UEC European Under-23 Championships
3rd Team pursuit, 05–06 UCI World Cup Classics, Manchester
2006
1st Scratch, UEC European Under-23 Championships
National Championships

1st Scratch
1st Madison (with Niki Terpstra)

3rd Scratch, UCI World Cup Classics, Sydney
2007
National Championships

1st Madison (with Niki Terpstra)
2nd Scratch
3rd Points race
3rd Individual pursuit

2nd Scratch, UCI World Championships
2nd Madison, UEC European Under-23 Championships (with Pim Ligthart)
2nd Scratch, UCI World Cup Classics, Los Angeles
2008
1st Omnium, UEC European Championships
National Championships

1st Points race
1st Individual pursuit
1st Scratch
1st Madison (with Peter Schep)

07–08 UCI World Cup Classics

1st Scratch, Copenhagen
3rd Madison, Copenhagen (with Peter Schep)
3rd Scratch, Los Angeles

08–09 UCI World Cup Classics, Manchester

1st Scratch
3rd Team pursuit

2nd Scratch, UCI World Championships
2010
2nd Scratch, National Championships
2011
2nd Six Days of Amsterdam
2nd Six Days of Ghent (with Peter Schep)
National Championships

3rd Points race
3rd Madison (with Peter Schep)

3rd Team pursuit, UCI World Cup, Astana
2012
1st Points race, National Championships
1st Six Days of Rotterdam (with Peter Schep)
3rd Scratch, UCI World Championships
2013
2nd Six Days of Ghent (with Iljo Keisse)
2nd Six Days of Rotterdam (with Peter Schep)
2014
1st Six Days of Bremen (with Leif Lampater)
2015
3rd Six Days of Bremen (with Leif Lampater)
2016
3rd Scratch, UEC European Championships
2017
3rd Six Days of Copenhagen (with Yoeri Havik)
3rd Six Days of Ghent (with Yoeri Havik)
3rd Six Days of Rotterdam (with Dylan van Baarle)
2018
1st Six Days of Berlin (with Yoeri Havik)
1st Six Days of London (with Yoeri Havik)
2nd Six Days of Rotterdam (with Yoeri Havik)
2019
3rd Scratch, UEC European Championships
3rd Six Days of London (with Yoeri Havik)
3rd Six Days of Rotterdam (with Yoeri Havik)

== See also ==
- List of Dutch Olympic cyclists
