= Mark Downey =

Irish road and track cyclist

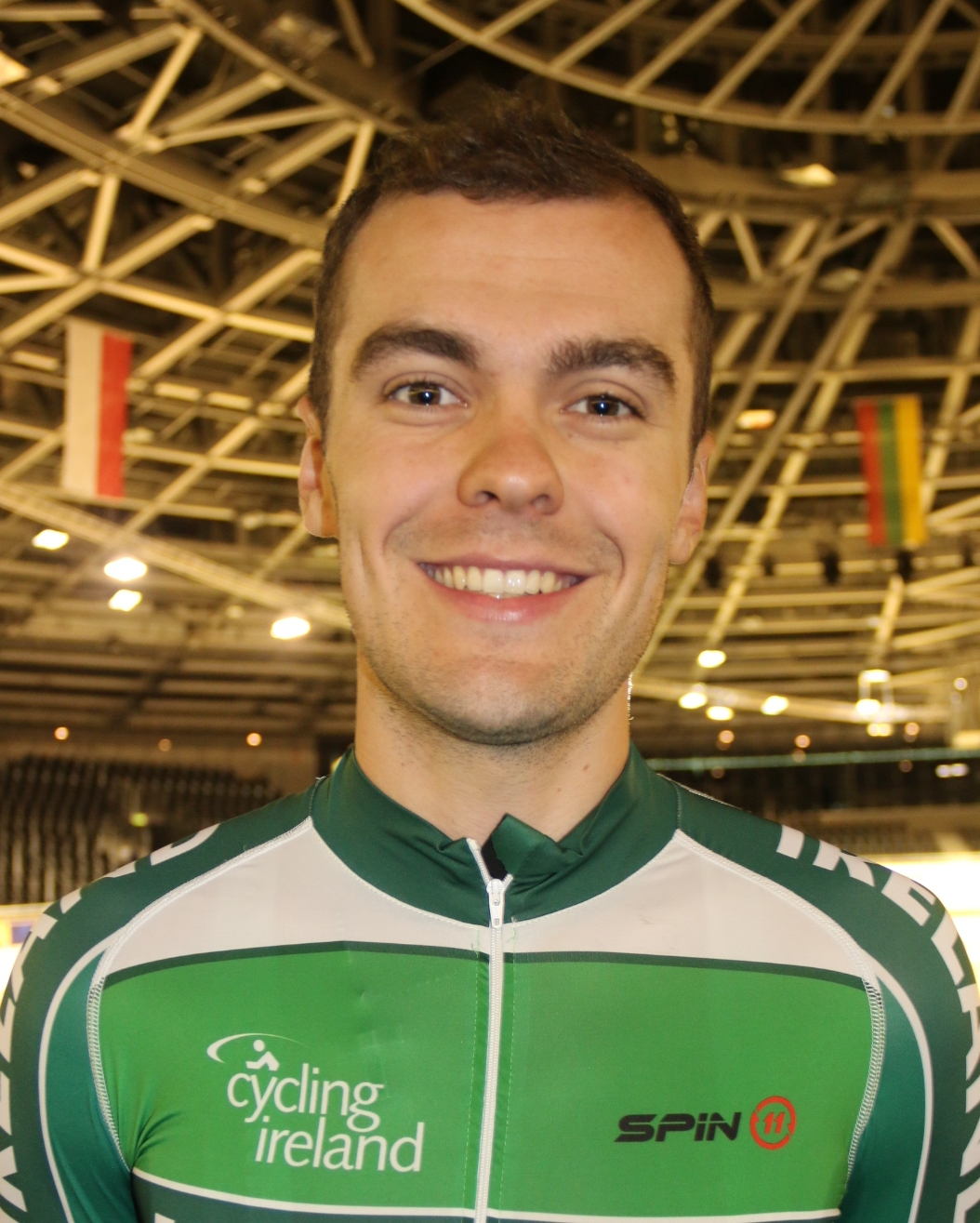
- Downey in 2017

Personal information
- Full name: Mark Downey
- Born: 3 July 1996 (age 30) Dromore, County Down, Northern Ireland
- Height: 1.83 m (6 ft 0 in)
- Weight: 74 kg (163 lb)

Cycling career
- Sport: Cycling
- Current team: Côtes d'Armor–Marie Morin–Véranda Rideau
- Disciplines: Track; Road
- Role: Rider
- Rider type: Puncheur

Amateur teams
- 2015: Banbridge CC
- 2016: VC Toucy
- 2017: CC Etupes
- 2020–: Côtes d'Armor–Marie Morin–Véranda Rideau

Professional teams
- 2018: WIGGINS
- 2019: EvoPro Racing
Medal record
World Championships
Bronze medal – third place	2019 Pruszków	Points race

Mark Downey (born 3 July 1996) is an Irish road and track cyclist, who currently rides for French amateur team Côtes d'Armor–Marie Morin–Véranda Rideau.

As a junior he competed at the 2014 UCI Road World Championships in the Men's junior time trial and also at the 2015 UCI Road World Championships in the Men's junior time trial.

On the track he competed at the 2015 UEC European Track Championships in the points race and team pursuit. He won the gold medal at the 2016–17 UCI Track Cycling World Cup, Round 2 in Apeldoorn in the points race. He also won the third round of the World Cup points race held in Cali, Colombia following that event he picked up a silver in the madison with his teammate Felix English. Concluding his 2017 World Cup campaign Downey won the madison in LA round 4 and was overall series winner in the points race.

== Major results ==
=== Road ===
2015
5th Time trial, National Road Championships
2016
1st Stage 6 Tour Nivernais Morvan
2017
9th Road race, UCI World Under-23 Championships
2018
3rd Road race, National Championships
3rd Overall Volta ao Alentejo

1st Young rider classification

4th Road race, Commonwealth Games
4th Clássica da Arrábida

=== Track ===
2016
1st Points race – Apeldoorn, UCI World Cup
2nd Points race, UEC European Under-23 Championships
2017
UCI World Cup

1st Points race, Cali
1st Madison (with Felix English), Los Angeles
2nd Madison (with Felix English), Cali

3rd Points race, UEC European Under-23 Championships
2019
3rd Points race, UCI World Championships
