= Maximilian Beyer =

German cyclist (born 1993)

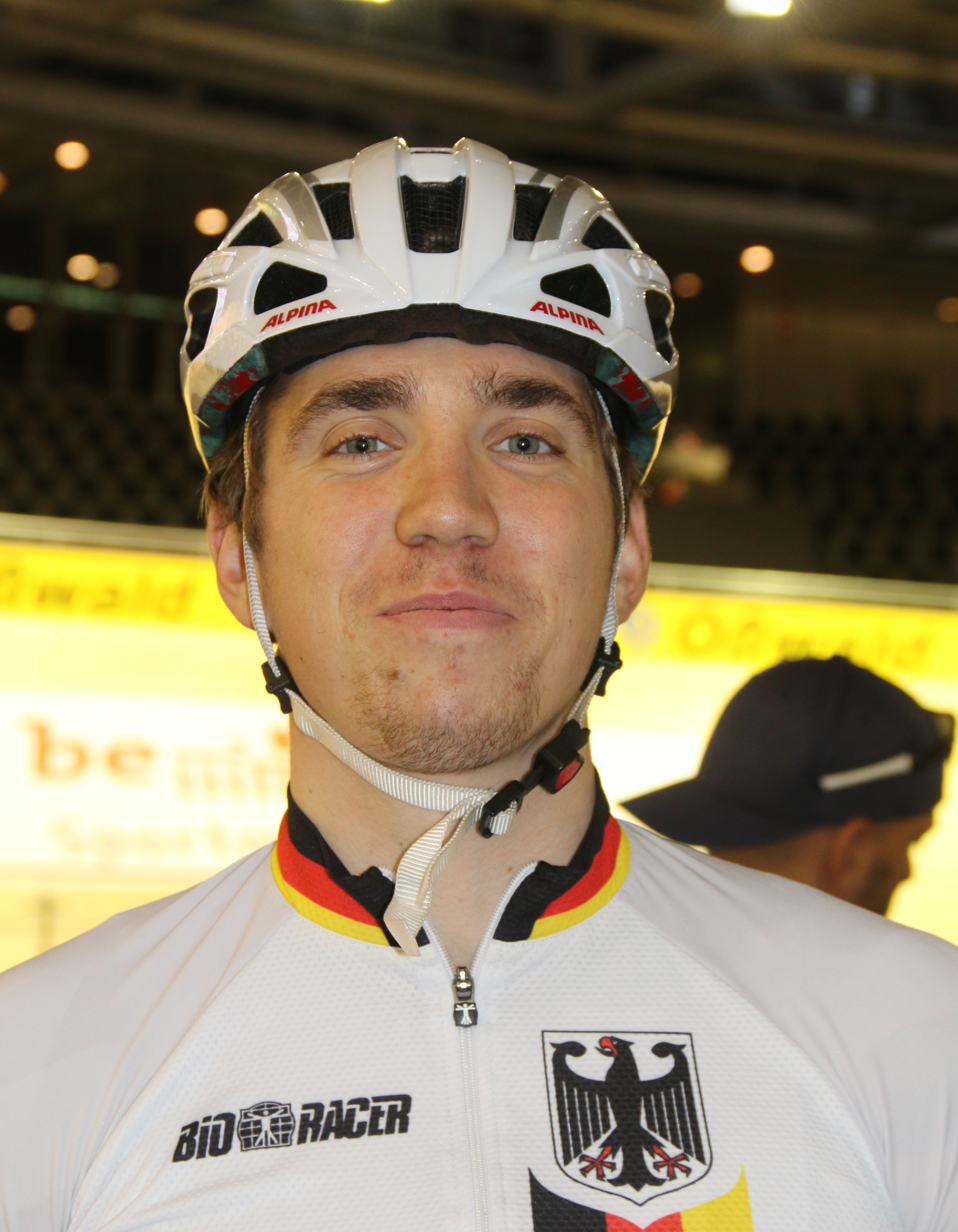
- Beyer in 2017

Personal information
- Full name: Maximilian Beyer
- Born: 28 December 1993 (age 32) Nordhausen, Germany

Cycling career
- Sport: Cycling
- Current team: Berliner TSC
- Disciplines: Track; Road
- Role: Rider

Amateur teams
- 2004–2005: SC Berlin
- 2006: Berliner TSC
- 2007–2014: SC Berlin
- 2010–2011: KED–Junior-Team Berlin
- 2012–2014: RG KED–Bianchi Team Berlin
- 2014: Rad-Net Rose Team (stagiaire)
- 2017: RSV Irschenberg
- 2017: Maloja Pushbikers
- 2021–: Berliner TSC

Professional team
- 2015–2020: Rad-Net Rose Team
Medal record
Representing Germany
Men's track cycling
World Championships
Bronze medal – third place	2015 Yvelines	Points race
European Championships
Silver medal – second place	2012 Panevėžys	Team pursuit
Bronze medal – third place	2017 Berlin	Points race
Bronze medal – third place	2019 Apeldoorn	Madison

Maximilian Beyer (born 28 December 1993) is a German racing cyclist, who currently rides for German amateur team Berliner TSC. He rode at the 2015 UCI Track Cycling World Championships.

== Major results ==
2010
3rd Team pursuit, UCI Junior Track World Championships
2011
1st Points race, National Junior Track Championships
2012
National Track Championships

1st Scratch
2nd Omnium
3rd Team pursuit

2nd Team pursuit, UEC European Track Championships
2013
National Track Championships

1st Omnium
1st Scratch
2nd Individual pursuit
3rd Points race

2014
1st Stage 3 Tour de Berlin
National Track Championships

2nd Madison
3rd Team pursuit

2015
3rd Points race, UCI Track Cycling World Championships
2016
National Track Championships

1st Omnium
1st Team pursuit (with Leif Lampater, Lucas Liss and Marco Mathis)

Bałtyk–Karkonosze Tour

1st Stages 2 & 3

1st Stage 1 Dookoła Mazowsza
2017
1st Stage 3 Bałtyk–Karkonosze Tour
National Track Championships

2nd Madison
2nd Omnium
3rd Points race
3rd Scratch

3rd Points race, UEC European Track Championships
2018
3rd Team pursuit, National Track Championships
2019
National Track Championships

1st Madison (with Theo Reinhardt)
1st Omnium
1st Scratch

3rd Madison, UEC European Track Championships
