= Jan-Willem van Schip =

Dutch cyclist (born 1994)

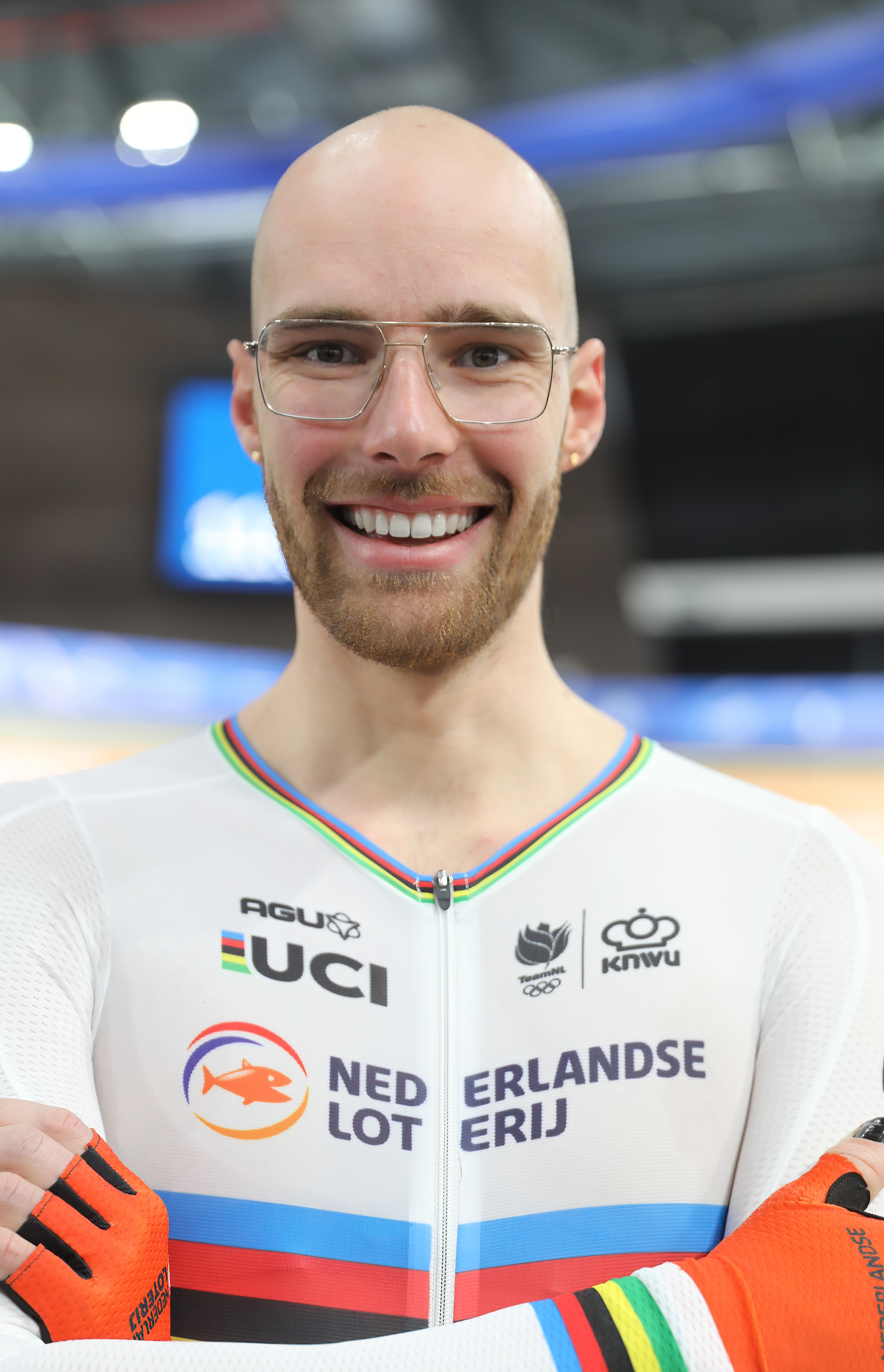
- Van Schip in 2024

Personal information
- Born: 20 August 1994 (age 32) Schalkwijk, Netherlands
- Height: 1.94 m (6 ft 4 in)
- Weight: 84 kg (185 lb)

Cycling career
- Sport: Cycling
- Current team: Azerion / Villa Valkenburg
- Disciplines: Road; Track
- Role: Rider

Amateur team
- 2013: Jan van Arckel

Professional teams
- 2014: Koga Cycling Team
- 2015: Baby-Dump Cyclingteam
- 2016–2017: Cyclingteam Join-S–De Rijke
- 2018–2019: Roompot–Nederlandse Loterij
- 2020–2022: BEAT Cycling Club
- 2023–: ABLOC CT

Major wins
- Track World Championships Madison (2023) Points race (2019)
Medal record
Men's track cycling
Representing the Netherlands
World Championships
| Gold medal – first place | 2019 Pruszków | Points race |
| Gold medal – first place | 2023 Glasgow | Madison |
| Silver medal – second place | 2018 Apeldoorn | Points race |
| Silver medal – second place | 2018 Apeldoorn | Omnium |
| Silver medal – second place | 2020 Berlin | Omnium |
European Games
| Gold medal – first place | 2019 Minsk | Omnium |
| Silver medal – second place | 2019 Minsk | Points race |
| Silver medal – second place | 2019 Minsk | Madison |
European Championships
| Gold medal – first place | 2021 Grenchen | Madison |
| Silver medal – second place | 2019 Apeldoorn | Points race |
| Silver medal – second place | 2019 Apeldoorn | Madison |

Jan-Willem van Schip (born 20 August 1994) is a Dutch professional road and track cyclist, who currently rides for UCI Continental team Azerion / Villa Valkenburg. He was disqualified from the men's Madison final at the 2024 Summer Olympics after headbutting his Team GB rival Ollie Wood and knocking him off his bike.

On the road he has been disqualified several times for using equipment (handlebars, seatpost) that UCI has declared illegal.

He announced his retirement on 12 September 2026, setting his farewell race to be the Six Days of Rotterdam that December.

== Major results ==
=== Road ===
2016
1st Grote Prijs Marcel Kint
1st Stage 1 Tour of Mersin
3rd Time trial, National Under-23 Championships
3rd Kernen Omloop Echt-Susteren
4th Overall Olympia's Tour

1st Points classification
1st Stage 2

6th ZODC Zuidenveld Tour
7th Ronde van Overijssel
2017
1st Ronde van Drenthe
1st Stage 3 Tour de Normandie
1st Stage 2 An Post Rás
1st Stage 3 Okolo Jižních Čech
5th Gooikse Pijl
5th Ronde van Noord-Holland
10th Arno Wallaard Memorial
2018
1st Slag om Norg
4th Great War Remembrance Race
5th Antwerp Port Epic
8th Tour de l'Eurométropole
2019
1st Stage 1 Tour of Belgium
4th Omloop van het Houtland
7th Dwars door het Hageland
8th Heistse Pijl
8th Antwerp Port Epic
2021
2nd Ronde van de Achterhoek
2022
7th Overall ZLM Tour
2024
2nd Overall Tour de la Mirabelle

=== Track ===
2017
National Championships

1st Omnium
2nd Scratch
2nd Points race
2nd Madison

2018
1st Omnium, UCI World Cup, Minsk
UCI World Championships

2nd Points race
2nd Omnium

National Championships

2nd Scratch
2nd Points race

2019
1st Points race, UCI World Championships
European Games

1st Omnium
2nd Points race
2nd Madison (with Yoeri Havik)

1st Omnium, National Championships
UEC European Championships

2nd Madison (with Yoeri Havik)
2nd Points race

2020
UCI World Cup, Milton

1st Madison (with Yoeri Havik)
1st Omnium

2nd Omnium, UCI World Championships
2021
1st Madison, UEC European Championships (with Yoeri Havik)
2022
UCI Nations Cup, Milton

1st Madison (with Yoeri Havik)
2nd Omnium

2023
1st Madison, UCI World Championships (with Yoeri Havik)
2nd Six Days of Ghent (with Yoeri Havik)
3rd Omnium, UCI Nations Cup, Milton
