= Sebastián Mora =

Spanish racing cyclist (born 1988)

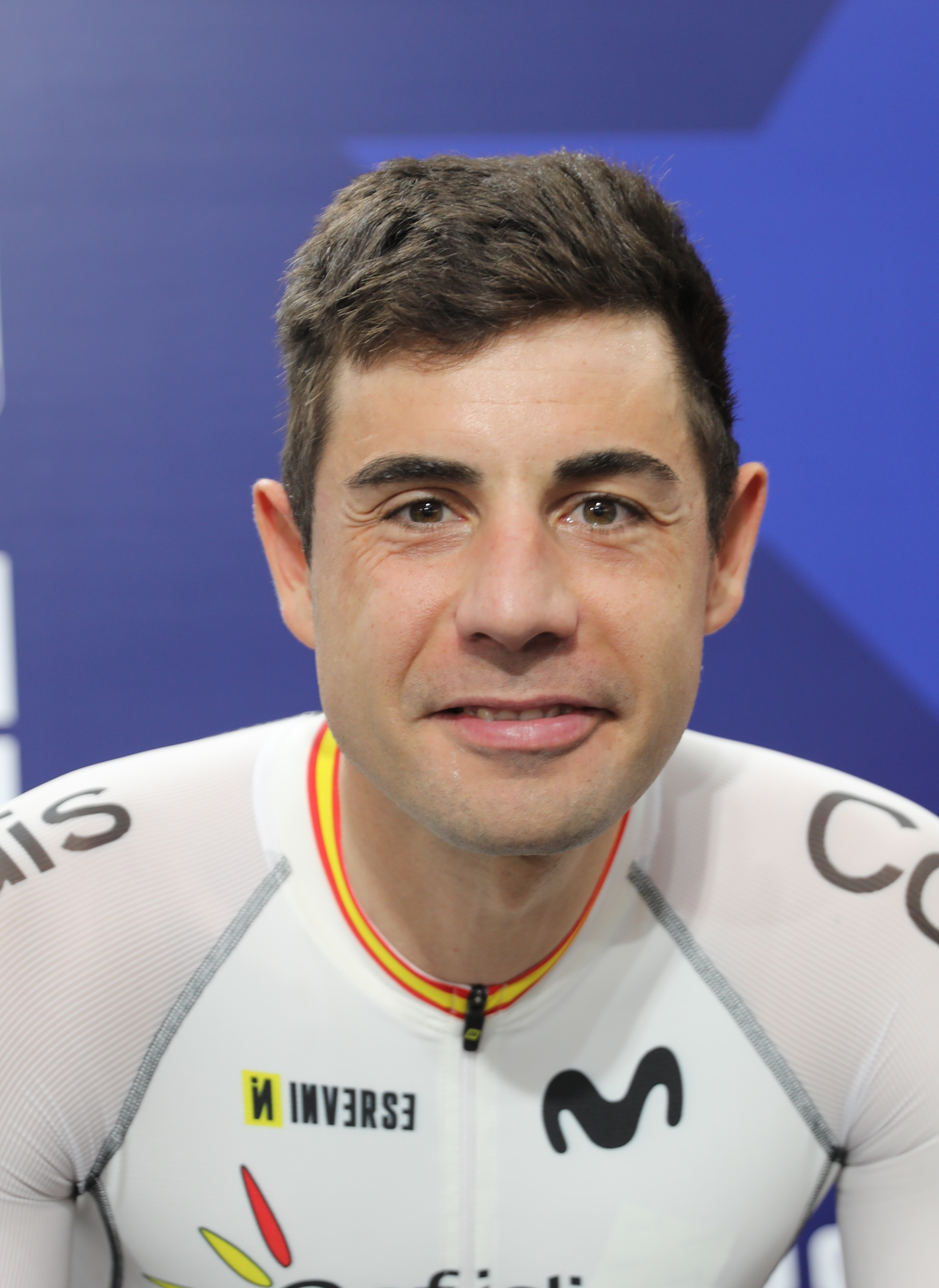
- Mora in 2024

Personal information
- Born: Sebastián Mora Vedri; 19 February 1988 (age 38) Villarreal, Spain
- Height: 1.81 m (5 ft 11 in)
- Weight: 70 kg (154 lb)

Cycling career
- Sport: Cycling
- Current team: Burgos Burpellet BH
- Disciplines: Track; Road
- Role: Rider

Amateur teams
- 2007: Würth
- 2009–2010: Asfaltos Guerola–CA Valencia Terra i Mar
- 2011–2012: UPV–Bancaja–CC Alginet
- 2013: Atika Sport–Asmeval
- 2014: CC Pasarela–Lucciol
- 2015: Atika–Safir Fruits
- 2018: Ginestar–ULB Sports

Professional teams
- 2014: Matrix Powertag
- 2016–2017: Team Raleigh–GAC
- 2019: Caja Rural–Seguros RGA
- 2020–2021: Movistar Team
- 2022: Manuela Fundación
- 2023–: Burgos BH

Major wins
- Track World Championships Scratch (2016) Points race (2024)
Medal record
Men's track cycling
Representing Spain
World Championships
Gold medal – first place	2016 London	Scratch
Gold medal – first place	2024 Ballerup	Points race
Silver medal – second place	2018 Apeldoorn	Madison
Silver medal – second place	2019 Pruszków	Points
Silver medal – second place	2020 Berlin	Points
Bronze medal – third place	2016 London	Madison
Bronze medal – third place	2020 Berlin	Scratch
European Championships
Gold medal – first place	2015 Grenchen	Scratch
Gold medal – first place	2015 Grenchen	Madison
Gold medal – first place	2016 Yvelines	Madison
Gold medal – first place	2019 Apeldoorn	Scratch
Gold medal – first place	2020 Plovdiv	Points
Gold medal – first place	2020 Plovdiv	Madison
Silver medal – second place	2024 Apeldoorn	Points race
Bronze medal – third place	2022 Munich	Omnium
U23 & Junior European Championships
Gold medal – first place	2010 Saint Petersburg	U23 Scratch
Gold medal – first place	2010 Saint Petersburg	U23 Madison

Sebastián Mora Vedri (born 19 February 1988) is a Spanish track cyclist and road cyclist, who currently rides for UCI ProTeam Burgos Burpellet BH. At the 2012 Summer Olympics, he competed in the Men's team pursuit for the national team.

== Major results ==
=== Road ===
2014
1st Stage 5 Tour of Thailand
2018
5th Time trial, National Road Championships

=== Track ===
2015
UEC European Championships

1st Madison (with Albert Torres)
1st Scratch

2016
UCI World Championships

1st Scratch
3rd Madison (with Albert Torres)

1st Madison, UEC European Championships (with Albert Torres)
1st Six Days of Rotterdam (with Albert Torres)
2018
2nd Madison, UCI World Championships (with Albert Torres)
2019
1st Scratch, UEC European Championships
2nd Points race, UCI World Championships
2020
UEC European Championships

1st Madison (with Albert Torres)
1st Points race

UCI World Championships

2nd Points race
3rd Scratch

2022
3rd Omnium, UEC European Championships
2024
1st Points race, UCI World Championships
2nd Points race, UEC European Championships
2025
1st Madison, UCI Nations Cup, Konya (with Albert Torres)
