= Michele Scartezzini =

Italian cyclist (born 1992)

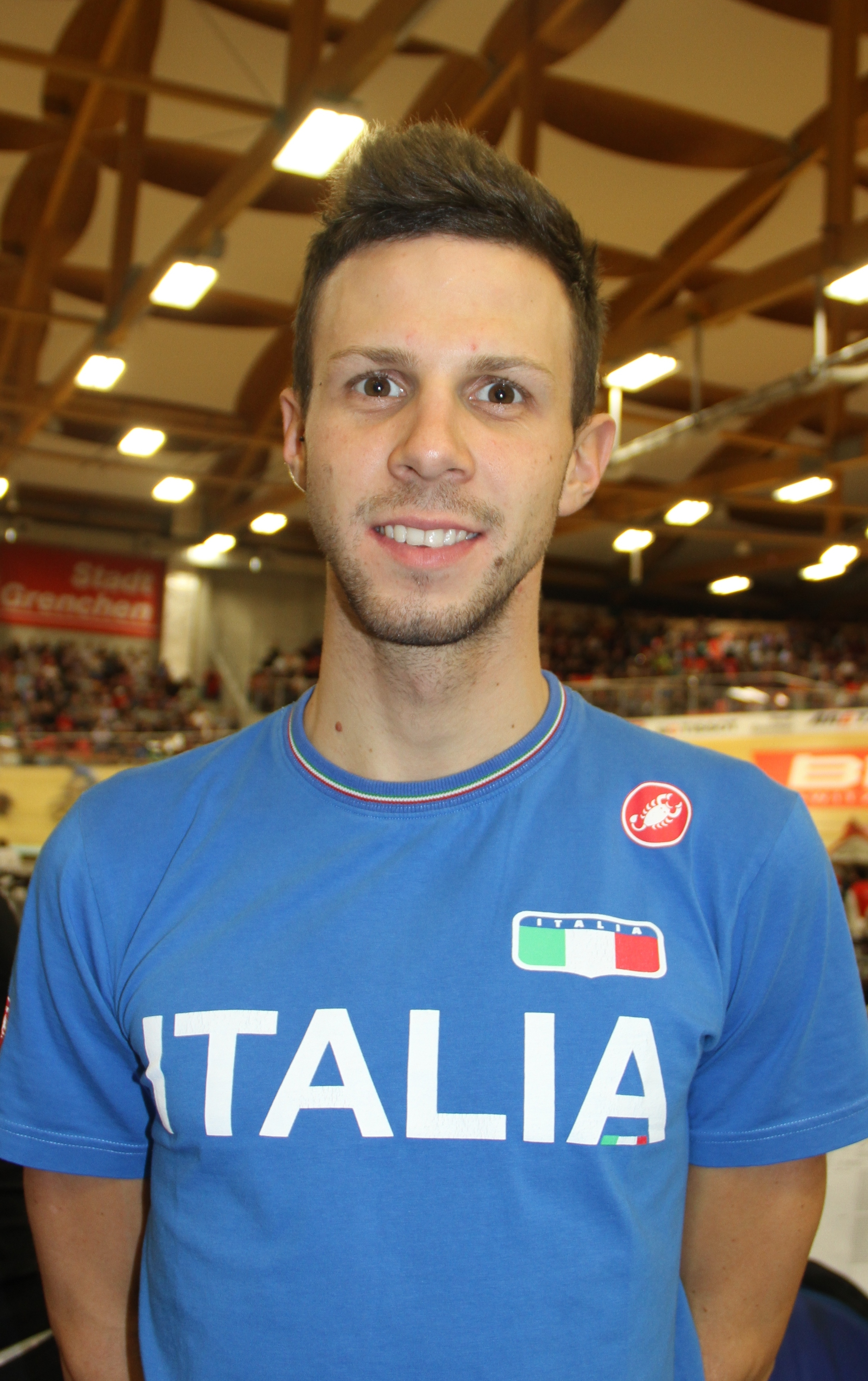
- Scartezzini in 2015

Personal information
- Born: 10 January 1992 (age 34) Isola della Scala, Italy
- Height: 1.83 m (6 ft 0 in)
- Weight: 63 kg (139 lb)

Cycling career
- Sport: Cycling
- Current team: Biesse–Carrera–Premac
- Disciplines: Road; Track
- Role: Rider
- Rider type: Pursuitist (track)

Amateur teams
- 2007–2010: U.S. Azzanese
- 2012–2013: U.C. Trevigiani–Dynamon–Bottoli

Professional teams
- 2014: Continental Team Astana
- 2015–2019: MG.K Vis–Vega
- 2020–: Biesse–Arvedi
Medal record
Men's track cycling
Representing Italy
World Championships
| Silver medal – second place | 2018 Apeldoorn | Scratch |
| Silver medal – second place | 2021 Roubaix | Madison |
| Bronze medal – third place | 2017 Hong Kong | Team pursuit |
| Bronze medal – third place | 2020 Berlin | Team pursuit |
European Championships
| Gold medal – first place | 2018 Glasgow | Team pursuit |
| Silver medal – second place | 2016 Yvelines | Team pursuit |
| Silver medal – second place | 2017 Berlin | Team pursuit |
| Silver medal – second place | 2019 Apeldoorn | Team pursuit |
| Silver medal – second place | 2023 Grenchen | Madison |
| Bronze medal – third place | 2012 Panevėžys | Team pursuit |
| Bronze medal – third place | 2019 Apeldoorn | Points race |

Michele Scartezzini (born 10 January 1992) is an Italian road and track cyclist, who currently competes for UCI Continental team Biesse–Carrera–Premac. He has competed at the UCI Track Cycling World Championships, since 2011, winning a silver medal in the scratch race in 2018 and bronze medals in the team pursuit in 2017 and 2020.

== Major results ==
2012
3rd Team pursuit, UEC European Track Championships
6th Coppa della Pace
2013
1st Trofeo Piva
4th Trofeo Edil C
2014
7th Trofeo Banca Popolare di Vicenza
8th Overall Tour of China I
8th Gran Premio Palio del Recioto
2015
3rd Memorial Denis Zanette e Daniele Del Ben
7th GP Adria Mobil
8th Trofeo Matteotti
2016
1st Six Days of Fiorenzuola (with Elia Viviani)
2nd Team pursuit, UEC European Track Championships
6th Trofeo Edil C
10th Circuito del Porto
2017
2nd Team pursuit, UEC European Track Championships
3rd Team pursuit, UCI Track World Championships
2018
1st Team pursuit, UEC European Track Championships
2nd Scratch race, UCI Track World Championships
2019
UEC European Track Championships

2nd Team pursuit
3rd Points race

2020
3rd Team pursuit, UCI Track World Championships
2021
2nd Madison, UCI Track World Championships (with Simone Consonni)
2022
UCI Track Nations Cup, Cali

1st Madison (with Francesco Lamon)
1st Team pursuit

2023
2nd Team pursuit, UCI Nations Cup, Milton
2025
3rd Six Days of Berlin (with Elia Viviani)
