= Vitaliy Hryniv =

Ukrainian cyclist (born 1995)

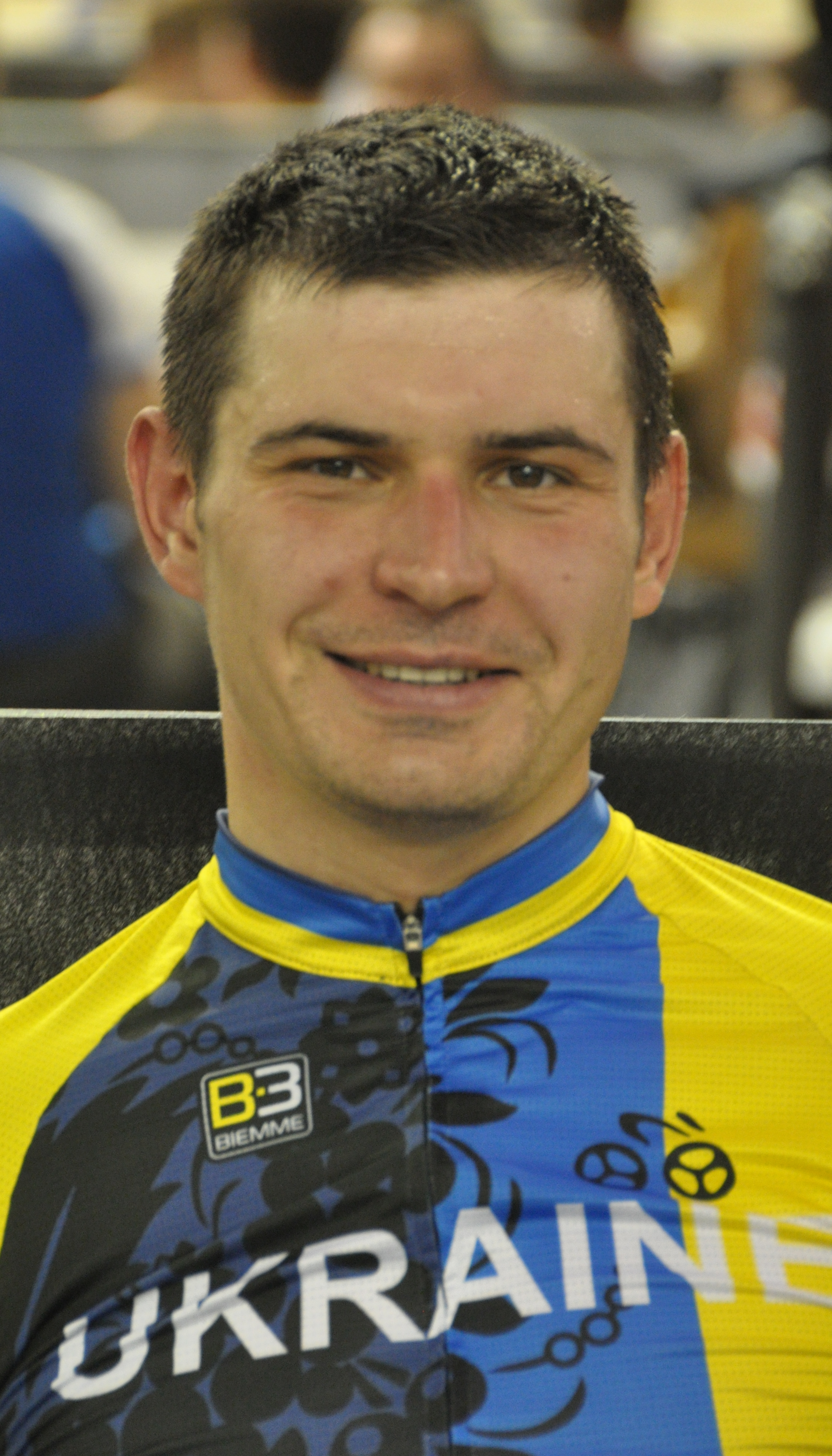
- Vitaliy Hryniv (2018)

Personal information
- Born: 5 April 1995 (age 31) Ternopil, Ukraine

Cycling career
- Sport: Cycling
- Discipline: Track cycling
- Role: Rider
- Rider type: points race madison team pursuit

Vitaliy Hryniv (born 5 April 1995) is a Ukrainian male track cyclist. He competed in the points race event and madison event at the 2015 UCI Track Cycling World Championships.
