= UEC European Track Championships – Men's individual pursuit =

UEC European Champion jersey

The men's individual pursuit at the UEC European Track Championships was first competed in 2014 in Guadeloupe, France.

== Medalists ==
Championships	Gold	Silver	Bronze
2014 Guadeloupe	Andrew Tennant (GBR)	Alexander Evtushenko (RUS)	Kersten Thiele (GER)
2015 Grenchen	Stefan Küng (SUI)	Domenic Weinstein (GER)	Dion Beukeboom (NED)
2016 Saint-Quentin-en-Yvelines	Corentin Ermenault (FRA)	Filippo Ganna (ITA)	Dion Beukeboom (NED)
2017 Berlin	Filippo Ganna (ITA)	Ivo Oliveira (PRT)	Domenic Weinstein (GER)
2018 Glasgow	Domenic Weinstein (GER)	Ivo Oliveira (PRT)	Claudio Imhof (SUI)
2019 Apeldoorn	Corentin Ermenault (FRA)	Domenic Weinstein (GER)	Felix Groß (GER)
2020 Plovdiv	Ivo Oliveira (POR)	Jonathan Milan (ITA)	Lev Gonov (RUS)
2021 Grenchen	Jonathan Milan (ITA)	Lev Gonov (RUS)	Claudio Imhof (SUI)
2022 Munich	Nicolas Heinrich (GER)	Davide Plebani (ITA)	Manlio Moro (ITA)
2023 Grenchen	Jonathan Milan (ITA)	Daniel Bigham (GBR)	Tobias Buck-Gramcko (GER)
2024 Apeldoorn	Daniel Bigham (GBR)	Charlie Tanfield (GBR)	Rasmus Pedersen (DEN)
2025 Heusden-Zolder	Josh Charlton (GBR)	Ivo Oliveira (POR)	Michael Gill (GBR)
2026 Konya	Lev Gonov (AIN)	Robin Juel Skivild (DEN)	Renato Favero (ITA)
