= 2014 UEC European Track Championships – Men's individual pursuit =

Men's individual pursuit at the 2014 UEC European Track Championships
- UEC European Champion jersey
- Venue: Vélodrome Amédée Détraux, Baie-Mahault
- Date: 18 October
- Competitors: 24 from 13 nations

Medalists
gold medal	Andy Tennant	Great Britain
silver medal	Alexander Evtushenko	Russia
bronze medal	Kersten Thiele	Germany

The Men's individual pursuit was held on 18 October 2014.

== Results ==
=== Qualifying ===
The fastest 4 competitors qualify for the medal finals.

Rank	Name	Nation	Time	Notes
1	Andy Tennant	Great Britain	4:33.581	QG
2	Alexander Evtushenko	Russia	4:36.372	QG
3	Nils Schomber	Germany	4:37.315	QB
4	Kersten Thiele	Germany	4:37.830	QB
5	Tom Bohli	Switzerland	4:39.533	
6	Dion Beukeboom	Netherlands	4:40.865	
7	Alexander Serov	Russia	4:41.007	
8	Siarhei Papok	Belarus	4:42.109	
9	Julien Morice	France	4:42.243	
10	Illart Zuazubiskar	Spain	4:43.524	
11	Volodymyr Dzhus	Ukraine	4:44.473	
12	Ryan Mullen	Ireland	4:44.800	
13	Aleh Ahiyevich	Belarus	4:47.151	
14	Roy Eefting	Netherlands	4:47.192	
15	Ed Clancy	Great Britain	4:49.370	
16	Marco Coledan	Italy	4:50.901	
17	Dominique Cornu	Belgium	4:51.322	
18	Casper von Folsach	Denmark	4:51.391	
19	Fabien Le Coguic	France	4:51.875	
20	Sebastián Mora	Spain	4:53.203	
21	Olivier Beer	Switzerland	4:53.604	
22	Daniel Hartvig	Denmark	4:54.608	
23	Roman Shevchuk	Ukraine	4:54.710	
24	Liam Bertazzo	Italy	5:04.550	

- QG = qualified for gold medal final
- QB = qualified for bronze medal final

=== Finals ===
The final classification is determined in the medal finals.

Rank	Name	Nation	Time	Notes
Bronze medal final
3rd place, bronze medalist(s)	Kersten Thiele	Germany	4:32.878	
4	Nils Schomber	Germany	4:34.604	
Gold medal final
1st place, gold medalist(s)	Andy Tennant	Great Britain	4:32.686	
2nd place, silver medalist(s)	Alexander Evtushenko	Russia	4:34.954	
