= UEC European Track Championships – Women's 500 m/1 km time trial =

UEC European Champion jersey

The women's 500 m time trial at the UEC European Track Championships was first competed in 2014 in Guadeloupe, France.

In 2025, the race distance was increased to 1 km, equalling the distance competed by the men.

== Medalists ==
=== 500 m time trial (2014–2024) ===
Championships	Gold	Silver	Bronze
2014 Guadeloupe	Anastasiia Voinova (RUS)	Elis Ligtlee (NED)	Miriam Welte (GER)
2015 Grenchen	Anastasiia Voinova (RUS)	Elis Ligtlee (NED)	Daria Shmeleva (RUS)
2016 Saint-Quentin-en-Yvelines	Daria Shmeleva (RUS)	Pauline Grabosch (GER)	Anastasiia Voinova (RUS)
2017 Berlin	Miriam Welte (GER)	Pauline Grabosch (GER)	Daria Shmeleva (RUS)
2018 Glasgow	Daria Shmeleva (RUS)	Olena Starikova (UKR)	Miriam Welte (GER)
2019 Apeldoorn	Anastasiia Voinova (RUS)	Daria Shmeleva (RUS)	Olena Starikova (UKR)
2020 Plovdiv	Daria Shmeleva (RUS)	Anastasiia Voinova (RUS)	Miriam Vece (ITA)
2021 Grenchen	Daria Shmeleva (RUS)	Pauline Grabosch (GER)	Yana Tyshchenko (RUS)
2022 Munich	Emma Hinze (GER)	Olena Starikova (UKR)	Miriam Vece (ITA)
2023 Grenchen	Emma Hinze (GER)	Taky Marie-Divine Kouamé (FRA)	Hetty van de Wouw (NED)
2024 Apeldoorn	Katy Marchant (GBR)	Taky Marie-Divine Kouamé (FRA)	Pauline Grabosch (GER)

=== 1 km time trial ===
Championships	Gold	Silver	Bronze
2025 Heusden-Zolder	Hetty van de Wouw (NED)	Martina Fidanza (ITA)	Clara Schneider (GER)
2026 Konya	Mathilde Gros (FRA)	Miriam Vece (ITA)	Yana Burlakova (AIN)
