= UEC European Track Championships – Women's keirin =

UEC European Champion jersey

The Women's keirin at the European Track Championships was first competed in 2010 in Poland.

The Keirin consists of several rounds with heats until the final.

== Medalists ==
| Championships | Gold | Silver | Bronze |
|---|---|---|---|
| 2010 Pruszków | Olga Panarina (BLR) | Simona Krupeckaitė (LTU) | Lyubov Shulika (UKR) |
| 2011 Apeldoorn | Victoria Pendleton (GBR) | Clara Sanchez (FRA) | Sandie Clair (FRA) |
| 2012 Panevėžys | Simona Krupeckaitė (LTU) | Ekaterina Gnidenko (RUS) | Elena Brezhniva (RUS) |
| 2013 Apeldoorn | Elis Ligtlee (NED) | Kristina Vogel (GER) | Virginie Cueff (FRA) |
| 2014 Guadeloupe | Kristina Vogel (GER) | Elena Brezhniva (RUS) | Shanne Braspennincx (NED) |
| 2015 Grenchen | Elis Ligtlee (NED) | Virginie Cueff (FRA) | Ekaterina Gnidenko (RUS) |
| 2016 Saint-Quentin-en-Yvelines | Liubov Basova (UKR) | Nicky Degrendele (BEL) | Simona Krupeckaitė (LTU) |
| 2017 Berlin | Kristina Vogel (GER) | Simona Krupeckaitė (LTU) | Liubov Basova (UKR) |
| 2018 Glasgow | Mathilde Gros (FRA) | Nicky Degrendele (BEL) | Daria Shmeleva (RUS) |
| 2019 Apeldoorn | Mathilde Gros (FRA) | Lea Friedrich (GER) | Daria Shmeleva (RUS) |
| 2020 Plovdiv | Olena Starikova (UKR) | Sára Kaňkovská (CZE) | Helena Casas (ESP) |
| 2021 Grenchen | Lea Friedrich (GER) | Olena Starikova (UKR) | Yana Tyshchenko (RUS) |
| 2022 Munich | Lea Friedrich (GER) | Urszula Łoś (POL) | Olena Starikova (UKR) |
| 2023 Grenchen | Lea Friedrich (GER) | Emma Finucane (GBR) | Emma Hinze (GER) |
| 2024 Apeldoorn | Lea Friedrich (GER) | Emma Finucane (GBR) | Hetty van de Wouw (NED) |
| 2025 Heusden-Zolder | Steffie van der Peet (NED) | Rhian Edmunds (GBR) | Hetty van de Wouw (NED) |
| 2026 Konya | Alina Lysenko (AIN) | Mathilde Gros (FRA) | Lea Friedrich (GER) |
