= UEC European Track Championships – Men's keirin =

UEC European Champion jersey

The Men's keirin at the European Track Championships was first competed in 2010 in Poland.

The Keirin consists of heats in which the first two or three riders advance until the final.

The most successful competitor in the event is the Dutch rider Harrie Levreysen, who has won the title four times as of 2025.

== Medalists ==
Championships	Gold	Silver	Bronze
2010 Pruszków	Jason Kenny (GBR)	Matthew Crampton (GBR)	Adam Ptáčník (CZE)
2011 Apeldoorn	Matthew Crampton (GBR)	Christos Volikakis (GRE)	François Pervis (FRA)
2012 Panevėžys	Tobias Wächter (GER)	Joachim Eilers (GER)	Denis Dmitriev (RUS)
2013 Panevėžys	Maximilian Levy (GER)	Jason Kenny (GBR)	François Pervis (FRA)
2014 Guadeloupe	Joachim Eilers (GER)	Matthijs Büchli (NED)	Denis Dmitriev (RUS)
2015 Grenchen	Pavel Kelemen (CZE)	François Pervis (FRA)	Denis Dmitriev (RUS)
2016 Saint-Quentin-en-Yvelines	Tomáš Bábek (CZE)	Andriy Vynokurov (UKR)	Charly Conord (FRA)
2017 Berlin	Maximilian Levy (GER)	Shane Perkins (RUS)	Andriy Vynokurov (UKR)
2018 Glasgow	Stefan Bötticher (GER)	Sébastien Vigier (FRA)	Jack Carlin (GBR)
2019 Apeldoorn	Harrie Lavreysen (NED)	Denis Dmitriev (RUS)	Matthijs Büchli (NED)
2020 Plovdiv	Maximilian Levy (GER)	Denis Dmitriev (RUS)	Sotirios Bretas (GRE)
2021 Grenchen	Jeffrey Hoogland (NED)	Tom Derache (FRA)	Joachim Eilers (GER)
2022 Munich	Sébastien Vigier (FRA)	Maximilian Dörnbach (GER)	Melvin Landerneau (FRA)
2023 Grenchen	Harrie Lavreysen (NED)	Patryk Rajkowski (POL)	Jeffrey Hoogland (NED)
2024 Apeldoorn	Harrie Lavreysen (NED)	Mateusz Rudyk (POL)	Stefano Moro (ITA)
2025 Heusden-Zolder	Harrie Lavreysen (NED)	Maximilian Dörnbach (GER)	Tom Derache (FRA)
2026 Konya	Matthew Richardson (GBR)	Harrie Lavreysen (NED)	Lowie Nulens (BEL)
