= 2015 UEC European Track Championships – Men's team pursuit =

Men's team pursuit at the 2015 UEC European Track Championships
- UEC European Champion jersey
- Venue: Velodrome Suisse, Grenchen
- Date: 14-15 October
- Competitors: 63 from 14 nations

Medalists
gold medal	Jon Dibben; Owain Doull; Andy Tennant; Bradley Wiggins; Steven Burke; Matthew Gibson	Great Britain
silver medal	Silvan Dillier; Stefan Küng; Frank Pasche; Théry Schir	Switzerland
bronze medal	Lasse Norman Hansen; Daniel Hartvig; Casper Pedersen; Rasmus Quaade; Mathias Møller Nielsen	Denmark

The Men's team pursuit was held on 14-15 October 2015.

== Results ==
=== Qualifying ===
The fastest 8 teams qualify for the first round, from which the top 4 remain in contention for the gold medal final and the other 4 for the bronze medal final.

Rank	Name	Nation	Time	Notes
1	Steven Burke; Andy Tennant; Owain Doull; Bradley Wiggins	Great Britain	3:57.277	Q, CR
2	Silvan Dillier; Stefan Küng; Frank Pasche; Théry Schir	Switzerland	3:59.026	Q
3	Thomas Boudat; Bryan Coquard; Damien Gaudin; Julien Morice	France	4:00.735	Q
4	Viktor Manakov; Sergey Shilov; Dmitry Sokolov; Kirill Sveshnikov	Russia	4:01.152	Q
5	Lasse Norman Hansen; Mathias Møller Nielsen; Casper Pedersen; Rasmus Quaade	Denmark	4:02.319	q
6	Henning Bommel; Leon Rohde; Kersten Thiele; Domenic Weinstein	Germany	4:02.341	q
7	Jasper De Buyst; Kenny De Ketele; Jonathan Dufrasne; Gijs Van Hoecke	Belgium	4:02.459	q
8	Elia Viviani; Liam Bertazzo; Simone Consonni; Filippo Ganna	Italy	4:02.884	q
9	Dion Beukeboom; Roy Eefting; Wim Stroetinga; Jan-Willem van Schip	Netherlands	4:03.271	
10	Illart Zuazubiskar; Sebastián Mora; Eloy Teruel; Albert Torres	Spain	4:03.864	
11	Raman Tsishkou; Yauheni Akhramenka; Yauheni Karaliok; Raman Ramanau	Belarus	4:04.878	
12	Roman Gladysh; Vitaliy Hryniv; Vladyslav Kreminskyi; Maksym Vasyliev	Ukraine	4:09.127	
13	Ondřej Vendolský; Roman Fürst; Nicolas Pietrula; František Sisr	Czech Republic	4:10.599	
14	Fintan Ryan; Mark Downey; Felix English; Martyn Irvine	Ireland	4:11.539	

- Q = qualified; in contention for gold medal final
- q = qualified; in contention for bronze medal final

=== First round ===
First round heats are held as follows:
Heat 1: 6th v 7th qualifier
Heat 2: 5th v 8th qualifier
Heat 3: 2nd v 3rd qualifier
Heat 4: 1st v 4th qualifier

The winners of heats 3 and 4 proceed to the gold medal final. The remaining 6 teams are ranked on time, then proceed to the finals for bronze, 5th or 7th place.

Rank	Heat	Name	Nation	Time	Notes
1	3	Silvan Dillier; Stefan Küng; Frank Pasche; Théry Schir	Switzerland	3:56.791	QG, CR
2	4	Steven Burke; Owain Doull; Matthew Gibson; Bradley Wiggins	Great Britain	3:57.513	QG
3	2	Lasse Norman Hansen; Mathias Møller Nielsen; Casper Pedersen; Rasmus Quaade	Denmark	3:56.960	QB
4	3	Thomas Boudat; Bryan Coquard; Damien Gaudin; Julien Morice	France	3:58.940	QB
5	4	Viktor Manakov; Sergey Shilov; Dmitry Sokolov; Kirill Sveshnikov	Russia	4:00.380	Q5
6	1	Henning Bommel; Leon Rohde; Kersten Thiele; Domenic Weinstein	Germany	4:01.026	Q5
7	1	Jasper De Buyst; Kenny De Ketele; Jonathan Dufrasne; Gijs Van Hoecke	Belgium	4:01.192	Q7
8	2	Elia Viviani; Liam Bertazzo; Simone Consonni; Filippo Ganna	Italy	4:01.211	Q7

- QG = qualified for gold medal final
- QB = qualified for bronze medal final
- Q5 = qualified for 5th place final
- Q7 = qualified for 7th place final

=== Finals ===
The final classification is determined in the ranking finals.

Rank	Name	Nation	Time	Notes
Final for 7th place
7	Elia Viviani; Liam Bertazzo; Simone Consonni; Michele Scartezzini	Italy	4:01.040	
8	Kenny De Ketele; Moreno De Pauw; Jonathan Dufrasne; Gijs Van Hoecke	Belgium	4:03.808	
Final for 5th place
5	Leon Rohde; Nils Schomber; Kersten Thiele; Domenic Weinstein	Germany	4:00.933	
6	Alexander Serov; Sergey Shilov; Dmitry Sokolov; Kirill Sveshnikov	Russia	4:01.299	
Bronze medal final
3rd place, bronze medalist(s)	Lasse Norman Hansen; Daniel Hartvig; Casper Pedersen; Rasmus Quaade	Denmark	3:57.930	
4	Thomas Boudat; Bryan Coquard; Damien Gaudin; Julien Morice	France	3:59.041	
Gold medal final
1st place, gold medalist(s)	Jon Dibben; Owain Doull; Andy Tennant; Bradley Wiggins	Great Britain	3:55.243	CR
2nd place, silver medalist(s)	Silvan Dillier; Stefan Küng; Frank Pasche; Théry Schir	Switzerland	3:57.245	
