= UEC European Track Championships – Women's scratch race =

UEC European Champion jersey

The women's scratch race at the UEC European Track Championships was first competed in 2014 in Guadeloupe, France.

The scratch race consists of a single race over a certain length. The winner is the first to cross the line, taking into cyclists who have lapped the peloton.

One of the less controllable events on the track, the first eleven editions of the event up to 2024 produced eleven different gold medalists. Martina Fidanza was the first cyclist to win a second title. Kirsten Wild of the Netherlands has the unique distinction of winning a medal of each colour.

== Medalists ==
Championships	Gold	Silver	Bronze
2014 Guadeloupe	Evgenia Romanyuta (RUS)	Laurie Berthon (FRA)	Elena Cecchini (ITA)
2015 Grenchen	Laura Trott (GBR)	Kirsten Wild (NED)	Roxane Fournier (FRA)
2016 Saint-Quentin-en-Yvelines	Ausrine Trebaite (LTU)	Elinor Barker (GBR)	Kirsten Wild (NED)
2017 Berlin	Trine Schmidt (DEN)	Evgenia Augustinas (RUS)	Tetyana Klimchenko (UKR)
2018 Glasgow	Kirsten Wild (NED)	Emily Kay (GBR)	Jolien D'Hoore (BEL)
2019 Apeldoorn	Emily Nelson (GBR)	Shannon McCurley (IRL)	Maria Martins (POR)
2020 Plovdiv	Martina Fidanza (ITA)	Hanna Tserakh (BLR)	Tetyana Klimchenko (UKR)
2021 Grenchen	Katie Archibald (GBR)	Valentine Fortin (FRA)	Daria Pikulik (POL)
2022 Munich	Anita Stenberg (NOR)	Jessica Roberts (GBR)	Nikola Wielowska (POL)
2023 Grenchen	Maria Martins (POR)	Eukene Larrarte (ESP)	Daria Pikulik (POL)
2024 Apeldoorn	Clara Copponi (FRA)	Lani Wittevrongel (BEL)	Martina Fidanza (ITA)
2025 Heusden-Zolder	Martina Fidanza (ITA)	Lorena Wiebes (NED)	Maria Martins (POR)
2026 Konya	Hélène Hesters (BEL)	Aline Seitz (SUI)	Lena Charlotte Reißner (GER)
