= UEC European Track Championships – Men's points race =

UEC European Champion jersey

The Men's points race at the European Track Championships was first competed in 2011 in the Netherlands.

The Points race consists of 160 laps or 40 kilometres (24.9 miles), with a sprint every 10 rounds to gain points. A lap ahead of the other riders is worth 20 points.

== Medalists ==
Championships	Gold	Silver	Bronze
2011 Apeldoorn	Rafał Ratajczyk; Poland	Silvan Dillier; Switzerland	Milan Kadlec; Czech Republic
2012 Panevėžys	Elia Viviani; Italy	Kirill Sveshnikov; Russia	Sergiy Lagkuti; Ukraine
2013 Apeldoorn	Elia Viviani; Italy	Thomas Boudat; France	Eloy Teruel; Spain
2014 Guadeloupe	Benjamin Thomas; France	Liam Bertazzo; Italy	Henning Bommel; Germany
2015 Grenchen	Wojciech Pszczolarski; Poland	Benjamin Thomas; France	Claudio Imhof; Switzerland
2016 Saint-Quentin-en-Yvelines	Niklas Larsen; Denmark	Kenny De Ketele; Belgium	Raman Ramanau; Belarus
2017 Berlin	Alan Banaszek; Poland	Niklas Larsen; Denmark	Maximilian Beyer; Germany
2018 Glasgow	Wojciech Pszczolarski; Poland	Kenny De Ketele; Belgium	Stefan Matzner; Austria
2019 Apeldoorn	Bryan Coquard; France	Jan van Schip; Netherlands	Christos Volikakis; Greece
2020 Plovdiv	Sebastián Mora; Spain	Matteo Donegà; Italy	Daniel Crista; Romania
2021 Grenchen	Benjamin Thomas; France	Iúri Leitão; Portugal	Vlas Shichkin; Russia
2022 Munich	Benjamin Thomas; France	Robbe Ghys; Belgium	Vincent Hoppezak; Netherlands
2023 Grenchen	Simone Consonni; Italy	Albert Torres; Spain	Donavan Grondin; France
2024 Apeldoorn	Niklas Larsen; Denmark	Sebastián Mora; Spain	Oscar Nilsson-Julien; France
2025 Heusden-Zolder	Iúri Leitão; Portugal	Yanne Dorenbos; Netherlands	Jasper De Buyst; Belgium
2026 Konya	Tim Torn Teutenberg; Germany	Conrad Haugsted; Denmark	Jasper De Buyst; Belgium
