= UEC European Track Championships – Women's sprint =

UEC European Champion jersey

The Women's sprint at the European Track Championships was first competed in 2010 in Poland.

The Sprint consists of a qualifying, followed by a knockout system until the final.

== Medalists ==
Championships	Gold	Silver	Bronze
2010 Pruszków	Sandie Clair; France	Kristina Vogel; Germany	Simona Krupeckaitė; Lithuania
2011 Apeldoorn	Lyubov Shulika; Ukraine	Olga Panarina; Belarus	Viktoria Baranova; Russia
2012 Panevėžys	Olga Panarina; Belarus	Anastasiia Voinova; Russia	Simona Krupeckaitė; Lithuania
2013 Apeldoorn	Kristina Vogel; Germany	Elis Ligtlee; Netherlands	Jessica Varnish; Great Britain
2014 Guadeloupe	Anastasiia Voinova; Russia	Tania Calvo; Spain	Kristina Vogel; Germany
2015 Grenchen	Elis Ligtlee; Netherlands	Anastasiia Voinova; Russia	Kristina Vogel; Germany
2016 Saint-Quentin-en-Yvelines	Simona Krupeckaitė; Lithuania	Anastasiia Voinova; Russia	Tania Calvo; Spain
2017 Berlin	Kristina Vogel; Germany	Mathilde Gros; France	Daria Shmeleva; Russia
2018 Glasgow	Daria Shmeleva; Russia	Anastasiia Voinova; Russia	Mathilde Gros; France
2019 Apeldoorn	Anastasiia Voinova; Russia	Olena Starikova; Ukraine	Lea Friedrich; Germany
2020 Plovdiv	Anastasiia Voinova; Russia	Daria Shmeleva; Russia	Olena Starikova; Ukraine
2021 Grenchen	Shanne Braspennincx; Netherlands	Lea Friedrich; Germany	Mathilde Gros; France
2022 Munich	Emma Hinze; Germany	Mathilde Gros; France	Laurine van Riessen; Netherlands
2023 Grenchen	Lea Friedrich; Germany	Pauline Grabosch; Germany	Sophie Capewell; Great Britain
2024 Apeldoorn	Emma Finucane; Great Britain	Lea Friedrich; Germany	Emma Hinze; Germany
2025 Heusden-Zolder	Yana Burlakova; Individual Neutral Athletes	Rhian Edmunds; Great Britain	Alina Lysenko; Individual Neutral Athletes
2026 Konya	Emma Finucane; Great Britain	Sophie Capewell; Great Britain	Alina Lysenko; Individual Neutral Athletes
