= 2016 UEC European Track Championships =

- Venue: Saint-Quentin-en-Yvelines, France
- Date: 19–23 October 2016
- Velodrome: Vélodrome de Saint-Quentin-en-Yvelines
- Nations participating: 27
- Events: 22 (11 women, 11 men)

The 2016 UEC European Track Championships was the seventh edition of the elite UEC European Track Championships in track cycling and took place at the Velodrome de Saint-Quentin-en-Yvelines in Saint-Quentin-en-Yvelines, France, between 19 and 23 October. The event was organised by the European Cycling Union. All European champions were awarded the UEC European Champion jersey which may be worn by the champion throughout the year when competing in the same event at other competitions.

The 10 Olympic events (sprint, team sprint, team pursuit, keirin and omnium for men and women), as well as 12 other events were on the program for these European Championships. For the first time ever, the Madison was on the program for women.

== Schedule ==
Schedule only indicating the finals.

Date	Men's finals	Women's finals
Wednesday 19 October	1 km Time Trial, Scratch Race	500m Time Trial, Elimination Race
Thursday 20 October	Team Sprint, Team Pursuit, Elimination Race	Team Sprint, Team Pursuit, Scratch Race
Friday 21 October	Omnium	Pursuit, Keirin, Points Race
Saturday 22 October	Sprint, Pursuit, Points Race	Omnium
Sunday 23 October	Keirin, Madison	Sprint, Madison

== Events ==
Event	Gold		Silver		Bronze	
Men's events
Sprint	Pavel Yakushevskiy; Russia		Roy van den Berg; Netherlands		Andriy Vynokurov; Ukraine	
Team sprint	Poland; Maciej Bielecki; Kamil Kuczyński; Mateusz Rudyk; Mateusz Lipa	43.211	Great Britain; Jack Carlin; Ryan Owens; Joseph Truman	43.398	Germany; Eric Engler; Robert Förstemann; Jan May	43.083
Team pursuit	France; Thomas Denis; Corentin Ermenault; Florian Maitre; Sylvain Chavanel; Benjamin Thomas	3:57.594	Italy; Filippo Ganna; Simone Consonni; Francesco Lamon; Michele Scartezzini; Liam Bertazzo	3:58.871	Great Britain; Matthew Bostock; Oliver Wood; Kian Emadi Coffin; Mark Stewart; Steven Burke	caught opponent
Keirin	Tomáš Bábek; Czech Republic		Andriy Vynokurov; Ukraine		Charly Conord; France	
Omnium	Albert Torres; Spain	126 pts	Gaël Suter; Switzerland	123 pts	Benjamin Thomas; France	114 pts
1km time trial^{[N]}	Quentin Lafargue; France	1:00.685	Eric Engler; Germany	1:00.807	Tomáš Bábek; Czech Republic	1:00.966
Pursuit^{[N]}	Corentin Ermenault; France	4:18.778	Filippo Ganna; Italy	4:19.084	Dion Beukeboom; Netherlands	4:21.905
Points race^{[O]}	Niklas Larsen; Denmark	83 pts	Kenny De Ketele; Belgium	53 pts	Raman Ramanau; Belarus	36 pts
Scratch race^{[O]}	Gaël Suter; Switzerland		Adrian Tekliński; Poland		Wim Stroetinga; Netherlands	-1 Lap
Elimination race^{[O]}	Loïc Perizzolo; Switzerland		Christos Volikakis; Greece		Jiří Hochmann; Czech Republic	
Madison^{[N]}	Spain; Sebastián Mora; Albert Torres	51 pts	France; Morgan Kneisky; Benjamin Thomas	45 pts	Belgium; Kenny De Ketele; Moreno De Pauw	44 pts
Women's events
Sprint	Simona Krupeckaitė; Lithuania		Anastasia Voinova; Russia		Tania Calvo; Spain	
Team sprint	Russia; Daria Shmeleva; Anastasia Voinova	33.356	Spain; Tania Calvo; Helena Casas	33.425	Lithuania; Simona Krupeckaitė; Miglė Marozaitė	33.871
Team pursuit	Italy; Elisa Balsamo; Tatiana Guderzo; Simona Frapporti; Silvia Valsecchi; Francesca Pattaro	4:22.314	Poland; Justyna Kaczkowska; Katarzyna Pawłowska; Daria Pikulik; Nikol Płosaj; Łucja Pietrzak	4:27.845	Great Britain; Emily Kay; Dannielle Khan; Manon Lloyd; Emily Nelson	4:26.744
Keirin	Lyubov Basova; Ukraine		Nicky Degrendele; Belgium		Simona Krupeckaitė; Lithuania	
Omnium	Katie Archibald; Great Britain	141 pts	Kirsten Wild; Netherlands	135 pts	Lotte Kopecky; Belgium	131 pts
500m Time Trial^{[N]}	Daria Shmeleva; Russia	34.310	Pauline Grabosch; Germany	34.318	Anastasia Voinova; Russia	34.483
Pursuit^{[N]}	Katie Archibald; Great Britain	3:29.878	Justyna Kaczkowska; Poland	3:33.188	Anna Turvey; Ireland	3:36.591
Points race^{[O]}	Kirsten Wild; Netherlands	25 pts	Jolien D'Hoore; Belgium	24 pts	Katarzyna Pawłowska; Poland	14 pts
Scratch race^{[O]}	Aušrinė Trebaitė; Lithuania		Elinor Barker; Great Britain		Kirsten Wild; Netherlands	
Elimination race^{[O]}	Kirsten Wild; Netherlands		Katie Archibald; Great Britain		Laurie Berthon; France	
Madison^{[N]}	Belgium; Jolien D'Hoore; Lotte Kopecky	36 pts	Great Britain; Emily Kay; Emily Nelson	26 pts	Netherlands; Nina Kessler; Kirsten Wild	22 pts

=== Notes ===
- Competitors named in italics only participated in rounds prior to the final.
- ^{^{N}} These events are not contested in the Olympics.
- ^{^{O}} In the Olympics, these events are contested within the omnium only.

== Medal table ==
* Host nation (France)

Rank	Nation	Gold	Silver	Bronze	Total
1	France (FRA)*	3	1	3	7
2	Russia (RUS)	3	1	1	5
3	Great Britain (GBR)	2	4	2	8
4	Netherlands (NED)	2	2	4	8
5	Spain (ESP)	2	1	1	4
6	Switzerland (SUI)	2	1	0	3
7	Lithuania (LTU)	2	0	2	4
8	Belgium (BEL)	1	3	2	6
9	Poland (POL)	1	3	1	5
10	Italy (ITA)	1	2	0	3
11	Ukraine (UKR)	1	1	1	3
12	Czech Republic (CZE)	1	0	2	3
13	Denmark (DEN)	1	0	0	1
14	Germany (GER)	0	2	1	3
15	Greece (GRE)	0	1	0	1
16	Belarus (BLR)	0	0	1	1
16	Ireland (IRL)	0	0	1	1
Totals (17 entries)		22	22	22	66
