= UEC European Track Championships – Women's individual pursuit =

European Champion Jersey

The European Champion Jersey

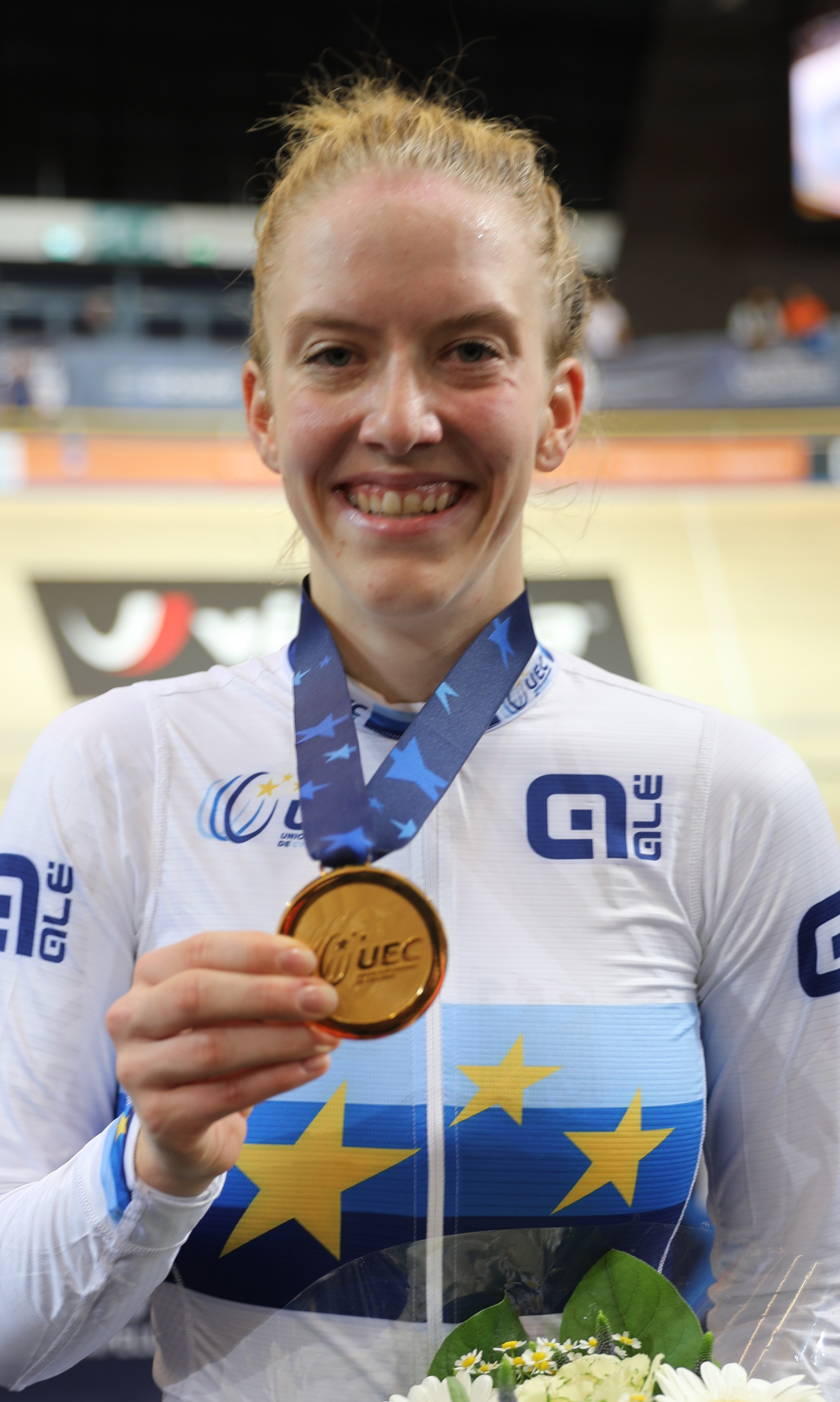
Franziska Brausse in her champions jersey, 2019

The original European Champions Jersey until 2015

The women's individual pursuit at the UEC European Track Championships was first competed in 2014 in Guadeloupe, France. Katie Archibald dominated the event in its early years, winning its first four editions, before finally being pushed into silver in 2018 by Lisa Brennauer of Germany and bronze in 2019 behind Franziska Brausse of Germany.

Brausse and Brennauer, along with Briton Josie Knight are the only multiple winners beside Archibald with two titles each. Archibald is the only rider to retain the title, which she did three times.

The event from a national viewpoint has been entirely dominated by Germany and Great Britain, taking all of the first thirteen titles between them (Great Britain eight, and Germany five) and over two-thirds of all available medals between them.

Beginning in 2025, the distance of the event increased from 3000 metres to 4000 metres to match the men's individual event, with Great Britain's Anna Morris taking the first 4000 metre title in a new world record.

== Medalists ==
Championships	Gold	Silver	Bronze
2014 Guadeloupe	Katie Archibald; Great Britain	Mieke Kröger; Germany	Vilija Sereikaitė; Lithuania
2015 Grenchen	Katie Archibald; Great Britain	Élise Delzenne; France	Ciara Horne; Great Britain
2016 Saint-Quentin-en-Yvelines	Katie Archibald; Great Britain	Justyna Kaczkowska; Poland	Anna Turvey; Ireland
2017 Berlin	Katie Archibald; Great Britain	Justyna Kaczkowska; Poland	Silvia Valsecchi; Italy
2018 Glasgow	Lisa Brennauer; Germany	Katie Archibald; Great Britain	Justyna Kaczkowska; Poland
2019 Apeldoorn	Franziska Brausse; Germany	Lisa Brennauer; Germany	Katie Archibald; Great Britain
2020 Plovdiv	Neah Evans; Great Britain	Martina Alzini; Italy	Silvia Valsecchi; Italy
2021 Grenchen	Lisa Brennauer; Germany	Marion Borras; France	Mieke Kröger; Germany
2022 Munich	Mieke Kröger; Germany	Lisa Brennauer; Germany	Vittoria Guazzini; Italy
2023 Grenchen	Franziska Brausse; Germany	Josie Knight; Great Britain	Mieke Kröger; Germany
2024 Apeldoorn	Josie Knight; Great Britain	Franziska Brauße; Germany	Anna Morris; Great Britain
2025 Heusden-Zolder	Anna Morris; Great Britain	Vittoria Guazzini; Italy	Mieke Kröger; Germany
2026 Konya	Josie Knight; Great Britain	Federica Venturelli; Italy	Millie Couzens; Great Britain
