= UEC European Track Championships – Women's team sprint =

UEC European Champion jersey

The Women's team sprint at the UEC European Track Championships was first contested at Pruszków, Poland in 2010.

As of 2016, the team sprint consists of a qualifying round, first round and the medal finals.

== Medalists ==
Championships	Gold	Silver	Bronze
2010 Pruszków	France; Sandie Clair; Clara Sanchez	United Kingdom; Victoria Pendelton; Jessica Varnish	Germany; Kristina Vogel; Miriam Welte
2011 Apeldoorn	United Kingdom; Victoria Pendleton; Jessica Varnish	Ukraine; Lyubov Shulika; Olena Tsyos	Germany; Kristina Vogel; Miriam Welte
2012 Panevėžys	Lithuania; Simona Krupeckaitė; Gintarė Gaivenytė	Russia; Anastasiia Voinova; Daria Shmeleva	France; Sandie Clair; Olivia Montauban
2013 Apeldoorn	Russia; Olga Stretsova; Elena Brezhniva	Germany; Kristina Vogel; Miriam Welte	United Kingdom; Jessica Varnish; Becky James
2014 Guadeloupe	Russia; Anastasiia Voinova; Elena Brezhniva; Daria Shmeleva	Germany; Kristina Vogel; Miriam Welte	Netherlands; Elis Ligtlee; Shanne Braspennincx
2015 Grenchen	Russia; Anastasiia Voinova; Daria Shmeleva	Germany; Kristina Vogel; Miriam Welte	Netherlands; Elis Ligtlee; Laurine van Riessen
2016 Saint-Quentin-en-Yvelines	Russia; Daria Shmeleva; Anastasiia Voinova	Spain; Tania Calvo; Helena Casas	Lithuania; Simona Krupeckaitė; Miglė Marozaitė
2017 Berlin	Russia; Daria Shmeleva; Anastasiia Voinova	Germany; Kristina Vogel; Miriam Welte	Netherlands; Kyra Lamberink; Shanne Braspennincx
2018 Glasgow	Russia; Daria Shmeleva; Anastasiia Voinova	Ukraine; Liubov Basova; Olena Starikova	Germany; Miriam Welte; Emma Hinze
2019 Apeldoorn	Russia; Daria Shmeleva; Anastasiia Voinova; Ekaterina Rogovaya	Germany; Lea Friedrich; Emma Hinze	Netherlands; Kyra Lamberink; Shanne Braspennincx; Steffie van der Peet
2020 Plovdiv	Russia; Anastasia Voynova; Daria Shmeleva; Natalia Antonova; Ekaterina Rogovaya	Great Britain; Milly Tanner; Blaine Ridge-Davis; Lusia Steele; Lauren Bate	Ukraine; Liubov Basova; Olena Starikova; Oleksandra Lohviniuk
2021 Grenchen	Netherlands; Shanne Braspennincx; Kyra Lamberink; Hetty van de Wouw; Steffie van der Peet	Germany; Lea Friedrich; Pauline Grabosch; Alessa-Catriona Pröpster	Russia; Natalia Antonova; Daria Shmeleva; Yana Tyshchenko; Anastasia Voynova
2022 Munich	Germany; Lea Friedrich; Pauline Grabosch; Emma Hinze	Netherlands; Shanne Braspennincx; Kyra Lamberink; Hetty van de Wouw; Steffie van der Peet	Poland; Marlena Karwacka; Urszula Łoś; Nikola Sibiak
2023 Grenchen	Germany; Lea Friedrich; Pauline Grabosch; Emma Hinze; Alessa-Catriona Pröpster	Great Britain; Lauren Bell; Emma Finucane; Katy Marchant; Sophie Capewell	Netherlands; Kyra Lamberink; Hetty van de Wouw; Steffie van der Peet
2024 Apeldoorn	Germany; Lea Friedrich; Pauline Grabosch; Emma Hinze	Great Britain; Sophie Capewell; Emma Finucane; Katy Marchant; Lowri Thomas	Netherlands; Kyra Lamberink; Hetty van de Wouw; Steffie van der Peet
2025 Heusden-Zolder	Netherlands; Kimberly Kalee; Hetty van de Wouw; Steffie van der Peet	Great Britain; Lauren Bell; Rhian Edmunds; Rhianna Parris-Smith	Germany; Lea Friedrich; Pauline Grabosch; Clara Schneider
2026 Konya	Germany; Lea Friedrich; Pauline Grabosch; Clara Schneider	United Kingdom; Sophie Capewell; Rhianna Parris-Smith; Lowri Thomas; Lauren Bell	Netherlands; Kimberly Kalee; Hetty van de Wouw; Steffie van der Peet
