= UEC European Track Championships – Men's scratch race =

UEC European Champion jersey

The Men's scratch race at the UEC European Track Championships was first competed in 2014 in Guadeloupe, France.

The scratch race consists of a single race of 15 km. The winner is the first to cross the line, taking into cyclists who have lapped the peloton.

== Medalists ==
Championships	Gold	Silver	Bronze
2014 Guadeloupe	Otto Vergaerde; Belgium	Eloy Teruel; Spain	Ed Clancy; Great Britain
2015 Grenchen	Sebastián Mora; Spain	Tristan Marguet; Switzerland	Adrian Tekliński; Poland
2016 Saint-Quentin-en-Yvelines	Gaël Suter; Switzerland	Adrian Tekliński; Poland	Wim Stroetinga; Netherlands
2017 Berlin	Adrien Garel; France	Krisztián Lovassy; Hungary	Roman Gladysh; Ukraine
2018 Glasgow	Roman Gladysh; Ukraine	Adrien Garel; France	Tristan Marguet; Switzerland
2019 Apeldoorn	Sebastián Mora; Spain	Christos Volikakis; Greece	Wim Stroetinga; Netherlands
2020 Plovdiv	Iúri Leitão; Portugal	Roman Gladysh; Ukraine	Oliver Wood; Great Britain
2021 Grenchen	Rui Oliveira; Portugal	Vincent Hoppezak; Netherlands	JB Murphy; Ireland
2022 Munich	Iúri Leitão; Portugal	Moritz Malcharek; Germany	Roy Eefting; Netherlands
2023 Grenchen	Oliver Wood; Great Britain	Roy Eefting; Netherlands	Donavan Grondin; France
2024 Apeldoorn	Iúri Leitão; Portugal	Tim Wafler; Austria	Tobias Hansen; Denmark
2025 Heusden-Zolder	Iúri Leitão; Portugal	Vincent Hoppezak; Netherlands	William Tidball; Great Britain
2026 Konya	Alex Vogel; Switzerland	Ilya Savekin; Individual Neutral Athletes	Vincent Hoppezak; Netherlands
