= UEC European Track Championships – Men's elimination race =

UEC European Champion jersey

The Men's elimination race at the UEC European Track Championships was first competed in 2015 in Grenchen, Switzerland.

The elimination race, also known colloquially as "the Devil" (from the idiom "devil take the hindmost"), is a race in which at the end of every second lap the last rider to cross the line is eliminated from the race. The final two cyclists then take part in what amounts to a rolling start match sprint. Although included in the omnium for several years, its first stand alone appearance was in 2015.

== Medalists ==
Championships	Gold	Silver	Bronze
2015 Grenchen	Bryan Coquard (FRA)	Simone Consonni (ITA)	Christopher Latham (GBR)
2016 Saint-Quentin-en-Yvelines	Loïc Perizzolo (SUI)	Christos Volikakis (GRE)	Jiří Hochmann (CZE)
2017 Berlin	Gerben Thijssen (BEL)	Maksim Piskunov (RUS)	Rui Oliveira (POR)
2018 Glasgow	Matthew Walls (GBR)	Rui Oliveira (POR)	Szymon Krawczyk (POL)
2019 Apeldoorn	Elia Viviani (ITA)	Bryan Coquard (FRA)	Filip Prokopyszyn (POL)
2020 Plovdiv	Matthew Walls (GBR)	Iúri Leitão (POR)	Sergey Rostovtsev (RUS)
2021 Grenchen	Sergey Rostovtsev (RUS)	João Matias (POR)	Thomas Boudat (FRA)
2022 Munich	Elia Viviani (ITA)	Theo Reinhardt (GER)	Jules Hesters (BEL)
2023 Grenchen	Tim Torn Teutenberg (GER)	Rui Oliveira (POR)	Philip Heijnen (NED)
2024 Apeldoorn	Tobias Hansen (DEN)	William Tidball (GBR)	Jules Hesters (BEL)
2025 Heusden-Zolder	Tim Torn Teutenberg (GER)	Rui Oliveira (POR)	Jules Hesters (BEL)
2026 Konya	Tobias Hansen (DEN)	Tim Torn Teutenberg (GER)	Jules Hesters (BEL)
