= UEC European Track Championships – Women's team pursuit =

UEC European Champion jersey

The Women's team pursuit at the European Track Championships was first competed in 2010 in Poland. Originally raced by three riders over 3000 metres, in 2013 it became a four rider, 4000 metre event identical to the men's equivalent.

The Team pursuit competition at the European championships consists of a qualifying round raced as a time trial, followed by a final between the two fastest teams and the race for the bronze medal between the teams in 3rd and 4th place after qualification.

The most successful country in the event has been Great Britain with ten of the seventeen titles won by the British teams. Katie Archibald is the most successful rider in the event with eight titles and one silver medal, narrowly ahead of compatriots Laura Kenny also with eight gold medals and Elinor Barker with six golds medals and one silver.

== Medalists ==
Championships	Gold	Silver	Bronze
2010 Pruszków	Great Britain; Katie Colclough; Wendy Houvenaghel; Laura Trott	Lithuania; Vaida Pikauskaitė; Vilija Sereikaitė; Aušrinė Trebaitė	Germany; Lisa Brennauer; Verena Jooss; Madeleine Sandig
2011 Apeldoorn	Great Britain; Danielle King; Joanna Rowsell; Laura Trott	Germany; Charlotte Becker; Lisa Brennauer; Madeleine Sandig	Belarus; Alena Dylko; Aksana Papko; Tatsiana Sharakova
2012 Panevėžys	Lithuania; Aušrinė Trebaitė; Vilija Sereikaitė; Vaida Pikauskaitė	Poland; Katarzyna Pawłowska; Eugenia Bujak; Małgorzata Wojtyra	Belarus; Tatsiana Sharakova; Alena Dylko; Aksana Papko
2013 Apeldoorn	Great Britain; Danielle King; Joanna Rowsell; Laura Trott; Elinor Barker; Katie Archibald	Poland; Katarzyna Pawłowska; Eugenia Bujak; Małgorzata Wojtyra; Edyta Jasińska	Russia; Aleksandra Chekina; Evgenia Romanyuta; Gulnaz Badykova; Maria Mishina
2014 Guadeloupe	Great Britain; Laura Trott; Ciara Horne; Elinor Barker; Katie Archibald; Joanna Rowsell	Russia; Tamara Balabolina; Irina Molicheva; Aleksandra Goncharova; Evgenia Romanyuta; Alexandra Chekina	Italy; Simona Frapporti; Beatrice Bartelloni; Tatiana Guderzo; Silvia Valsecchi; Maria Giulia Confalonieri
2015 Grenchen	Great Britain; Laura Trott; Elinor Barker; Katie Archibald; Joanna Rowsell; Ciara Horne	Russia; Tamara Balabolina; Gulnaz Badykova; Aleksandra Chekina; Maria Savitskaya; Evgenia Romanyuta; Aleksandra Goncharova	Belarus; Katsiaryna Piatrouskaya; Polina Pivavarava; Ina Savenka; Marina Shmayankova
2016 Saint-Quentin-en-Yvelines	Italy; Simona Frapporti; Elisa Balsamo; Tatiana Guderzo; Silvia Valsecchi; Francesca Pattaro	Poland; Katarzyna Pawłowska; Justyna Kaczkowska; Daria Pikulik; Nikol Płosaj; Łucja Pietrzak	Great Britain; Emily Kay; Dannielle Khan; Manon Lloyd; Emily Nelson
2017 Berlin	Italy; Elisa Balsamo; Tatiana Guderzo; Silvia Valsecchi; Letizia Paternoster	Great Britain; Emily Kay; Elinor Barker; Manon Lloyd; Katie Archibald	Poland; Katarzyna Pawłowska; Justyna Kaczkowska; Daria Pikulik; Nikol Płosaj
2018 Glasgow	Great Britain; Laura Trott; Elinor Barker; Katie Archibald; Neah Evans; Ellie Dickinson	Italy; Elisa Balsamo; Tatiana Guderzo; Silvia Valsecchi; Letizia Paternoster	Germany; Charlotte Becker; Gudrun Stock; Mike Kroger; Lisa Brennauer
2019 Apeldoorn	Great Britain; Katie Archibald; Neah Evans; Ellie Dickinson; Laura Kenny	Germany; Franziska Brausse; Lisa Brennauer; Gudrun Stock; Lisa Klein	Italy; Elisa Balsamo; Martina Alzini; Vittoria Guazzini; Letizia Paternoster
2020 Plovdiv	Great Britain; Josie Knight; Laura Kenny; Katie Archibald; Neah Evans; Elinor Barker	Italy; Martina Alzini; Elisa Balsamo; Chiara Consonni; Vittoria Guazzini; Rachele Barbieri	Ukraine; Anna Nahirna; Tetyana Klimchenko; Viktoriya Bondar; Yuliia Biriukova
2021 Grenchen	Germany; Franziska Brausse; Lisa Brennauer; Mieke Kröger; Laura Süßemilch; Lena Charlotte Reißner	Italy; Martina Alzini; Rachele Barbieri; Martina Fidanza; Silvia Zanardi; Letizia Paternoster	Ireland; Mia Griffin; Emily Kay; Kelly Murphy; Alice Sharpe
2022 Munich	Germany; Franziska Brausse; Lisa Brennauer; Mieke Kröger; Lisa Klein	Italy; Letizia Paternoster; Rachele Barbieri; Vittoria Guazzini; Silvia Zanardi; Martina Fidanza	France; Victoire Berteau; Marion Borras; Clara Copponi; Valentine Fortin
2023 Grenchen	Great Britain; Josie Knight; Anna Morris; Katie Archibald; Neah Evans; Elinor Barker	Italy; Martina Alzini; Elisa Balsamo; Vittoria Guazzini; Martina Fidanza; Letizia Paternoster	Germany; Franziska Brausse; Laura Süßemilch; Mieke Kröger; Lisa Klein
2024 Apeldoorn	Italy; Elisa Balsamo; Martina Fidanza; Vittoria Guazzini; Letizia Paternoster	Great Britain; Megan Barker; Josie Knight; Anna Morris; Jessica Roberts; Neah Evans	Germany; Franziska Brauße; Lisa Klein; Lena Charlotte Reißner; Laura Süßemilch; Mieke Kröger
2025	Italy; Martina Alzini; Chiara Consonni; Martina Fidanza; Vittoria Guazzini	Germany; Franziska Brauße; Lisa Klein; Mieke Kröger; Laura Süßemilch	Great Britain; Sophie Leech; Tegan Lewis; Elizabeth Lister; Anna Morris; Neah Evans
2026	Great Britain; Katie Archibald; Millie Couzens; Josie Knight; Anna Morris; Kate Richardson	Germany; Franziska Brauße; Lisa Klein; Mieke Kröger; Laura Süßemilch	Italy; Elisa Balsamo; Letizia Paternoster; Linda Sanarini; Federica Venturelli
