= UEC European Track Championships – Women's elimination race =

UEC European Champion jersey

The Women's elimination race at the UEC European Track Championships was first competed in 2015 in Grenchen, Switzerland.

The elimination race, also known colloquially as "the Devil" (from the idiom "devil take the hindmost"), is a race in which at the end of every second lap the last rider to cross the line is eliminated from the race. The final two cyclists then take part in what amounts to a rolling start match sprint. Although included in the omnium for several years, its first stand alone appearance was in 2015.

Lotte Kopecky is the most successful cyclists in this event, with four European titles for Belgium.

== Medalists ==
Championships	Gold	Silver	Bronze
2015 Grenchen	Katie Archibald (GBR)	Annalisa Cucinotta (ITA)	Irene Usabiaga (ESP)
2016 Saint-Quentin-en-Yvelines	Kirsten Wild (NED)	Katie Archibald (GBR)	Laurie Berthon (FRA)
2017 Berlin	Kirsten Wild (NED)	Evgenia Augustinas (RUS)	Maria Giulia Confalonieri (ITA)
2018 Glasgow	Laura Kenny (GBR)	Anna Knauer (GER)	Evgenia Augustinas (RUS)
2019 Apeldoorn	Kirsten Wild (NED)	Emily Nelson (GBR)	Nikol Płosaj (POL)
2020 Plovdiv	Elinor Barker (GBR)	Rachele Barbieri (ITA)	Maria Martins (POR)
2021 Grenchen	Valentine Fortin (FRA)	Letizia Paternoster (ITA)	Neah Evans (GBR)
2022 Munich	Lotte Kopecky (BEL)	Pfeiffer Georgi (GBR)	Mylene De Zoete (NED)
2023 Grenchen	Lotte Kopecky (BEL)	Valentine Fortin (FRA)	Maike van der Duin (NED)
2024 Apeldoorn	Lotte Kopecky (BEL)	Lea Lin Teutenberg (GER)	Jessica Roberts (GBR)
2025 Heusden-Zolder	Lara Gillespie (IRL)	Hélène Hesters (BEL)	Lisa van Belle (NED)
2026 Konya	Lotte Kopecky (BEL)	Victoire Berteau (FRA)	Lea Lin Teutenberg (GER)
