= 2017 UEC European Track Championships =

Continental track cycling competition

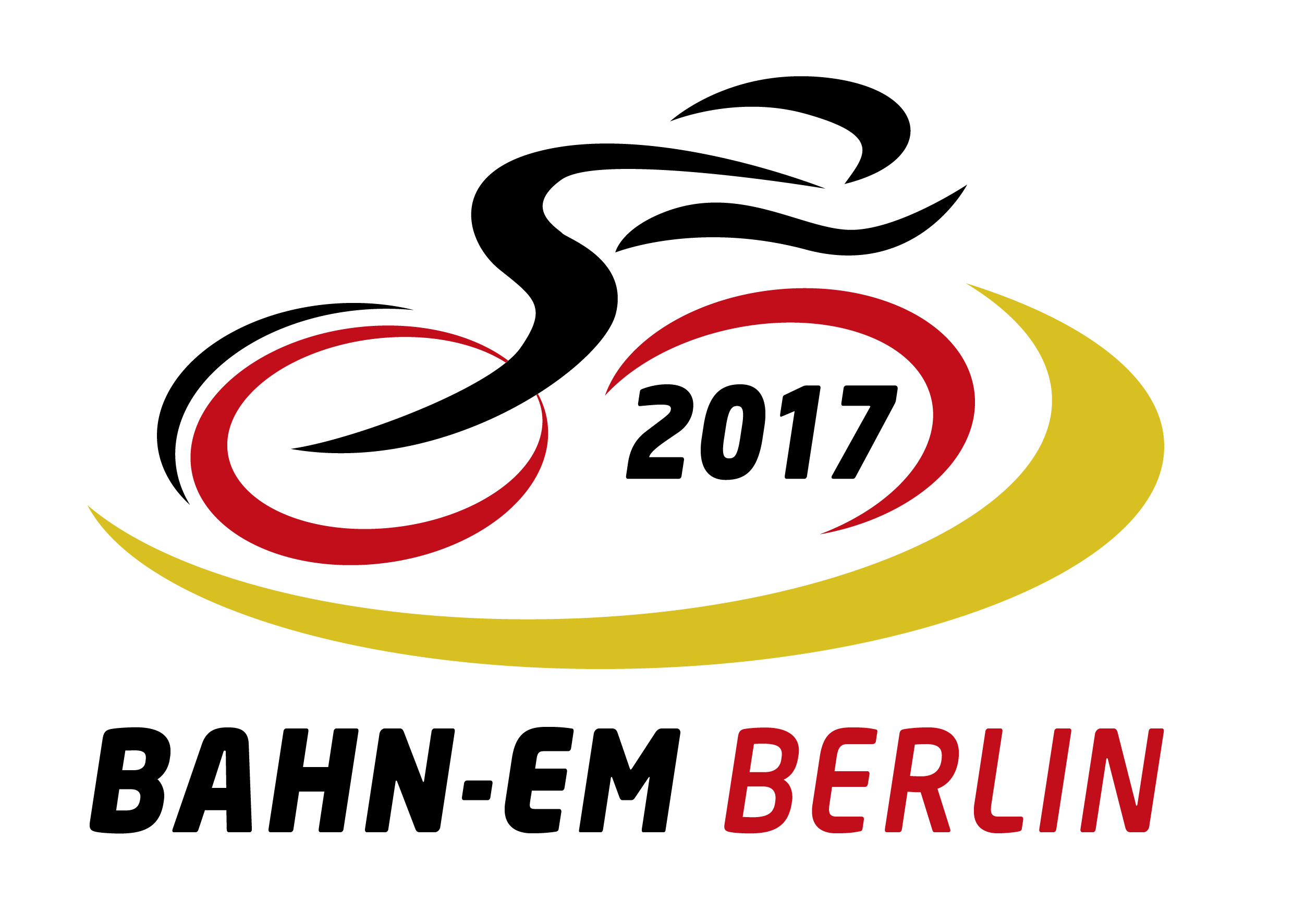
- Venue: Berlin, Germany
- Date: 19–22 October 2017
- Velodrome: Velodrom
- Events: 23 (11 women, 12 men)

The 2017 UEC European Track Championships was the eighth edition of the elite UEC European Track Championships in track cycling and took place at the Velodrom in Berlin, Germany, from 19 to 22 October 2017. The event was organised by the European Cycling Union. All European champions were awarded the UEC European Champion jersey which could have been worn by the champion throughout the year when competing in the same event at other competitions.

The 12 Olympic events (sprint, team sprint, team pursuit, keirin, madison and omnium for men and women), as well as 11 other events were on the program for these European Championships.

== Schedule ==
Schedule only indicating the finals.

Date	Men's finals	Women's finals
Thursday 19 October	Team Sprint, Team Pursuit, Scratch Race	Team Sprint, Team Pursuit, Elimination Race
Friday 20 October	Sprint, Elimination Race, Omnium	500m Time Trial, Pursuit, Points Race
Saturday 21 October	1 km Time Trial, Pursuit, Points Race, Stayer	Omnium, Keirin, Scratch Race
Sunday 22 October	Keirin, Madison	Sprint, Madison

== Events ==
Event	Gold		Silver		Bronze	
Men's Events
Sprint	Sébastien Vigier; France		Jeffrey Hoogland; Netherlands		Denis Dmitriev; Russia	
Team Sprint	France; Benjamin Edelin; Sébastien Vigier; Quentin Lafargue	43.254	Germany; Robert Förstemann; Maximilian Levy; Joachim Eilers	43.337	Netherlands; Jeffrey Hoogland; Harrie Lavreysen; Matthijs Büchli	43.405
Team Pursuit	France; Louis Pijourlet; Corentin Ermenault; Florian Maitre; Benjamin Thomas; Thomas Denis	3:55.780	Italy; Liam Bertazzo; Filippo Ganna; Francesco Lamon; Simone Consonni; Michele Scartezzini	3:55.986	Russia; Alexander Evtushenko; Mamyr Stash; Dmitri Sokolov; Aleksei Kurbatov; Sergey Shilov	3:57.517
Keirin	Maximilian Levy; Germany		Shane Perkins; Russia		Andrii Vynokurov; Ukraine	
Omnium	Albert Torres; Spain	142	Julius Johansen; Denmark	140	Benjamin Thomas; France	137
Madison	France; Florian Maitre; Benjamin Thomas	43	Denmark; Niklas Larsen; Casper Pedersen	42	Poland; Wojciech Pszczolarski; Daniel Staniszewski	40
1km Time Trial^{[N]}	Jeffrey Hoogland; Netherlands	1:00.700	Joachim Eilers; Germany	1:00.733	Quentin Lafargue; France	1:00.906
Pursuit^{[N]}	Filippo Ganna; Italy	4:15.994	Ivo Oliveira; Portugal	4:18.991	Domenic Weinstein; Germany	4:15.405
Points Race^{[O]}	Alan Banaszek; Poland	49	Niklas Larsen; Denmark	45	Maximilian Beyer; Germany	34
Scratch Race^{[O]}	Adrien Garel; France		Krisztián Lovassy; Hungary		Roman Gladysh; Ukraine	
Elimination Race^{[O]}	Gerben Thijssen; Belgium		Maksim Piskunov; Russia		Rui Oliveira; Portugal	
Stayer (50 km)^{[N]}	Germany; Franz Schiewer; Gerhard Geßler	46:17	Netherlands; Reinier Honig; Jos Pronk	46:19	Germany; Stefan Schäfer; Peter Bauerlein	46:30
Women's Events
Sprint	Kristina Vogel; Germany		Mathilde Gros; France		Daria Shmeleva; Russia	
Team Sprint	Russia; Anastasiia Voinova; Daria Shmeleva	32.560	Germany; Miriam Welte; Kristina Vogel; Pauline Grabosch	32.807	Netherlands; Kyra Lamberink; Shanne Braspennincx; Hetty van de Wouw	33.180
Team Pursuit	Italy; Elisa Balsamo; Tatiana Guderzo; Letizia Paternoster; Silvia Valsecchi	4:17.853	Great Britain; Emily Kay; Elinor Barker; Manon Lloyd; Katie Archibald; Ellie Dickinson	4:21.164	Poland; Justyna Kaczkowska; Katarzyna Pawłowska; Daria Pikulik; Nikol Płosaj	4:24.705
Keirin	Kristina Vogel; Germany		Simona Krupeckaitė; Lithuania		Lyubov Basova; Ukraine	
Omnium	Katie Archibald; Great Britain	127	Kirsten Wild; Netherlands	120	Elisa Balsamo; Italy	102
Madison	Great Britain; Elinor Barker; Eleanor Dickinson	58	Ireland; Lydia Boylan; Lydia Gurley	50	Netherlands; Amy Pieters; Kirsten Wild	46
500m Time Trial^{[N]}	Miriam Welte; Germany	33.321	Pauline Grabosch; Germany	33.559	Daria Shmeleva; Russia	33.757
Pursuit^{[N]}	Katie Archibald; Great Britain	3:29.328	Justyna Kaczkowska; Poland	3:32.452	Silvia Valsecchi; Italy	3:33.908
Points Race^{[O]}	Trine Schmidt; Denmark	62	Gulnaz Badykova; Russia	31	Tatsiana Sharakova; Belarus	29
Scratch Race^{[O]}	Trine Schmidt; Denmark		Tetyana Klimchenko; Ukraine		Evgenia Augustinas; Russia	
Elimination Race^{[O]}	Kirsten Wild; Netherlands		Evgenia Augustinas; Russia		Maria Giulia Confalonieri; Italy	

=== Notes ===
- Competitors named in italics only participated in rounds prior to the final.
- ^{^{N}} These events are not contested in the Olympics.
- ^{^{O}} In the Olympics, these events are contested within the omnium only.

== Medal table ==
* Host nation (Germany)

Rank	Nation	Gold	Silver	Bronze	Total
1	Germany (GER)*	5	4	3	12
2	France (FRA)	5	1	2	8
3	Great Britain (GBR)	3	1	0	4
4	Netherlands (NED)	2	3	3	8
5	Denmark (DEN)	2	3	0	5
6	Italy (ITA)	2	1	3	6
7	Russia (RUS)	1	4	5	10
8	Poland (POL)	1	1	2	4
9	Belgium (BEL)	1	0	0	1
9	Spain (ESP)	1	0	0	1
11	Ukraine (UKR)	0	1	3	4
12	Portugal (POR)	0	1	1	2
13	Hungary (HUN)	0	1	0	1
13	Ireland (IRL)	0	1	0	1
13	Lithuania (LTU)	0	1	0	1
16	Belarus (BLR)	0	0	1	1
Totals (16 entries)		23	23	23	69

== See also ==
- 2017 UEC European Track Championships (under-23 & junior)
