= Casper Pedersen =

Danish cyclist (born 1996)

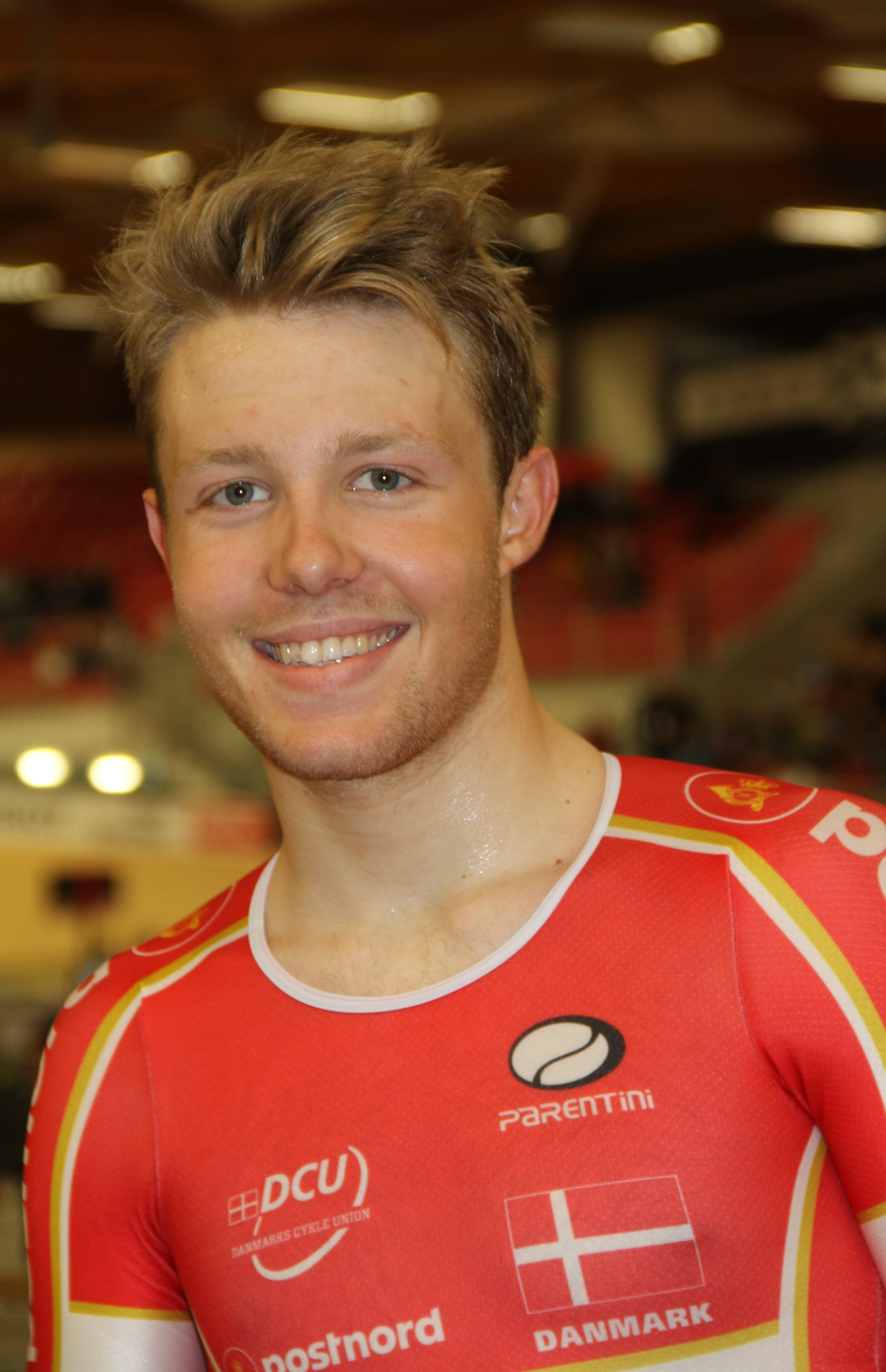
- Pedersen at the 2015 UEC European Track Championships

Personal information
- Full name: Casper Philip Pedersen
- Born: 15 March 1996 (age 30) Copenhagen, Denmark
- Height: 1.86 m (6 ft 1 in)
- Weight: 74 kg (163 lb)

Cycling career
- Sport: Cycling
- Current team: Soudal–Quick-Step
- Disciplines: Road; Track
- Role: Rider

Professional teams
- 2015–2016: Riwal Platform
- 2017: Team Giant–Castelli
- 2018: Aqua Blue Sport
- 2019–2022: Team Sunweb
- 2023–: Soudal–Quick-Step

Major wins
- One-day races and Classics Paris–Tours (2020)
Medal record
Representing Denmark
Men's track cycling
European Track Championships
| Bronze medal – third place | 2015 Grenchen | Team pursuit |
| Silver medal – second place | 2017 Berlin | Madison |
Men's road bicycle racing
European Championships
| Gold medal – first place | 2017 Herning | Under-23 road race |

Casper Philip Pedersen (born 15 March 1996) is a road and track cyclist from Denmark, who currently rides for UCI WorldTeam Soudal–Quick-Step.

In 2015, he competed at the 2015 UCI Track Cycling World Championships in the men's omnium. He won the bronze medal in the team pursuit at the 2015 UEC European Track Championships in Grenchen, Switzerland. In September 2018, Team Sunweb announced that Pedersen would join them on a three-year deal from 2019, initially with a role as a domestique in the Flanders classics and the team's sprint train. In 2020, he won his first race with the team at Paris–Tours in a two-man sprint with Benoît Cosnefroy. In 2023, he moved to Soudal–Quick-Step, and won the Figueira Champions Classic that February.

== Major results ==
=== Road ===
2014
2nd Paris–Roubaix Juniors
2015
3rd Scandinavian Race Uppsala
2016
2nd Road race, National Under-23 Championships
7th Eschborn-Frankfurt City Loop U23
2017 (1 pro win)
1st Road race, UEC European Under-23 Championships
1st GP Horsens
1st Stage 2 Flèche du Sud
2nd Fyen Rundt
2nd Eschborn-Frankfurt City Loop U23
3rd Road race, National Under-23 Championships
3rd Overall Danmark Rundt

1st Stage 1

10th Overall Kreiz Breizh Elites
2018
5th Overall Four Days of Dunkirk

1st Young rider classification

2020 (1)
1st Paris–Tours
2021
6th Overall Okolo Slovenska
2023 (1)
1st Figueira Champions Classic
3rd Overall Tour of Belgium
4th Trofeo Calvia
2025
3rd Road race, National Championships
4th E3 Saxo Classic
2026
3rd NXT Classic

==== Grand Tour general classification results timeline ====
| Grand Tour | 2019 | 2020 | 2021 | 2022 | 2023 | 2024 |
|---|---|---|---|---|---|---|
| Giro d'Italia | — | — | — | — | — | — |
| Tour de France | — | 92 | 111 | — | — | DNF |
| Vuelta a España | 103 | — | — | — | 140 | |

Legend
| — | Did not compete |
| DNF | Did not finish |

=== Track ===
2013
3rd Omnium, UCI World Junior Championships
2014
1st Omnium, UCI World Junior Championships
3rd Team pursuit, UCI World Cup, London
2015
3rd Team pursuit, UEC European Championships
2016
2nd Team pursuit, UCI World Cup, Hong Kong
2017
UCI World Cup

1st Team pursuit, Cali
2nd Madison, Los Angeles (with Julius Johansen)
2nd Team pursuit, Manchester

2nd Madison, UEC European Championships (with Niklas Larsen)
