= UEC European Track Championships – Women's points race =

Track cycling event

UEC European Champion jersey

The Women's points race at the European Track Championships was first competed in 2011 in the Netherlands.

The Points race lasts for a distance of 25 kilometres (15.5 miles) – 100 laps – with sprints every 10 rounds to gain extra points, a lap ahead of the other riders results in 20 points. In the 2014 edition, held on an outsized (333 metre) concrete outdoor velodrome, the race lasted 24 kilometres in 72 laps, with sprints every sixth lap.

== Medalists ==
Championships	Gold	Silver	Bronze
2011 Apeldoorn	Evgenia Romanyuta (RUS)	Katarzyna Pawłowska (POL)	Jarmila Machačová (CZE)
2012 Panevėžys	Stephanie Pohl (GER)	Evgenia Romanyuta (RUS)	Elke Gebhardt (GER)
2013 Apeldoorn	Kirsten Wild (NED)	Dani King (GBR)	Leire Olaberria (ESP)
2014 Guadeloupe	Eugenia Bujak (POL)	Kelly Druyts (BEL)	Elena Cecchini (ITA)
2015 Grenchen	Katarzyna Pawłowska (POL)	Élise Delzenne (FRA)	Stephanie Pohl (GER)
2016 Saint-Quentin-en-Yvelines	Kirsten Wild (NED)	Jolien D'Hoore (BEL)	Katarzyna Pawłowska (POL)
2017 Berlin	Trine Schmidt (DEN)	Gulnaz Badykova (RUS)	Tatsiana Sharakova (BLR)
2018 Glasgow	Maria Giulia Confalonieri (ITA)	Ina Savenka (BLR)	Gulnaz Badykova (RUS)
2019 Apeldoorn	Maria Giulia Confalonieri (ITA)	Tatsiana Sharakova (BLR)	Ganna Solovei (UKR)
2020 Plovdiv	Katie Archibald (GBR)	Silvia Zanardi (ITA)	Karolina Karasiewicz (POL)
2021 Grenchen	Gulnaz Khatuntseva (RUS)	Shari Bossuyt (BEL)	Lonneke Uneken (NED)
2022 Munich	Lotte Kopecky (BEL)	Silvia Zanardi (ITA)	Victoire Berteau (FRA)
2023 Grenchen	Anita Stenberg (NOR)	Shari Bossuyt (BEL)	Marie Le Net (FRA)
2024 Apeldoorn	Lotte Kopecky (BEL)	Anita Stenberg (NOR)	Jarmila Machačová (CZE)
2025 Heusden-Zolder	Anita Stenberg (NOR)	Marion Borras (FRA)	Maike van der Duin (NED)
2026 Konya	Lotte Kopecky (BEL)	Victoire Berteau (FRA)	Sofie van Rooijen (NED)
