= UEC European Track Championships – Men's 1 km time trial =

Men's 1 km time trial at UEC European Track Championships

UEC European Champion jersey

The men's 1 km time trial at the UEC European Track Championships was first competed in 2014 in Guadeloupe, France.

== Medalists ==
Championships	Gold	Silver	Bronze
2014 Guadeloupe	Callum Skinner; Great Britain	Joachim Eilers; Germany	Quentin Lafargue; France
2015 Grenchen	Jeffrey Hoogland; Netherlands	Joachim Eilers; Germany	Robin Wagner; Czech Republic
2016 Saint-Quentin-en-Yvelines	Quentin Lafargue; France	Eric Engler; Germany	Tomáš Bábek; Czech Republic
2017 Berlin	Jeffrey Hoogland; Netherlands	Joachim Eilers; Germany	Quentin Lafargue; France
2018 Glasgow	Matthijs Büchli; Netherlands	Joachim Eilers; Germany	Sam Ligtlee; Netherlands
2019 Apeldoorn	Quentin Lafargue; France	Theo Bos; Netherlands	Michael D'Almeida; France
2020 Plovdiv	Tomáš Bábek; Czech Republic	Ethan Vernon; Great Britain	Jonathan Milan; Italy
2021 Grenchen	Jeffrey Hoogland; Netherlands	Sam Ligtlee; Netherlands	Patryk Rajkowski; Poland
2022 Munich	Melvin Landerneau; France	Matteo Bianchi; Italy	Maximilian Dörnbach; Germany
2023 Grenchen	Jeffrey Hoogland; Netherlands	Alejandro Martínez; Spain	Maximilian Dörnbach; Germany
2024 Apeldoorn	Matteo Bianchi; Italy	Daan Kool; Netherlands	Melvin Landerneau; France
2025 Heusden-Zolder	Matteo Bianchi; Italy	Maximilian Dörnbach; Germany	David Peterka; Czech Republic
2026 Konya	Joseph Truman; Great Britain	Étienne Oliviero; France	David Peterka; Czech Republic
