= UEC European Track Championships – Women's madison =

The Women's madison is an annual event at the UEC European Track Championships. It was held for the first time in 2016 in Saint-Quentin-en-Yvelines, France.

== Medalists ==
| Championships | Gold | Silver | Bronze |
|---|---|---|---|
| 2016 Saint-Quentin-en-Yvelines | Belgium; Jolien D'Hoore; Lotte Kopecky | Netherlands; Nina Kessler; Kirsten Wild | Great Britain; Emily Kay; Emily Nelson |
| 2017 Berlin | Great Britain; Elinor Barker; Eleanor Dickinson | Ireland; Lydia Boylan; Lydia Gurley | Netherlands; Amy Pieters; Kirsten Wild |
| 2018 Glasgow | Denmark; Julie Leth; Amalie Dideriksen | Russia; Gulnaz Badykova; Diana Klimova | Netherlands; Amy Pieters; Kirsten Wild |
| 2019 Apeldoorn | Denmark; Julie Leth; Amalie Dideriksen | Great Britain; Katie Archibald; Laura Kenny | Netherlands; Amy Pieters; Kirsten Wild |
| 2020 Plovdiv | Italy; Elisa Balsamo; Vittoria Guazzini | Russia; Diana Klimova; Maria Novolodskaya | Great Britain; Laura Kenny; Elinor Barker |
| 2021 Grenchen | Great Britain; Katie Archibald; Neah Evans | Denmark; Amalie Dideriksen; Julie Leth | France; Victoire Berteau; Marion Borras |
| 2022 Munich | Italy; Silvia Zanardi; Rachele Barbieri | France; Clara Copponi; Marion Borras | Denmark; Amalie Dideriksen; Julie Leth |
| 2023 Grenchen | Great Britain; Katie Archibald; Elinor Barker | France; Clara Copponi; Victoire Berteau | Italy; Elisa Balsamo; Vittoria Guazzini |
| 2024 Apeldoorn | France; Valentine Fortin; Marion Borras | Belgium; Katrijn De Clercq; Lotte Kopecky | Italy; Elisa Balsamo; Vittoria Guazzini |
| 2025 Heusden-Zolder | Netherlands; Lisa van Belle; Maike van der Duin | Italy; Chiara Consonni; Vittoria Guazzini | France; Victoire Berteau; Marion Borras |
| 2026 Konya | Belgium; Lotte Kopecky; Shari Bossuyt | United Kingdom; Katie Archibald; Anna Morris | Italy; Elisa Balsamo; Federica Venturelli |
