= 2012 UEC European Track Championships =

- Venue: Panevėžys, Lithuania
- Date(s): 19–21 October 2012
- Velodrome: Cido Arena
- Nations participating: 21
- Cyclists participating: 146
- Events: 13

The 2012 European Track Championships was the third edition of the elite European Track Championships in track cycling. It was held on October 19–21, 2012 and took place at the Cido Arena in Panevėžys, Lithuania.

It was the first European Elite Track Championships that had opening ceremony. The opening ceremony was held on 19 October, an hour before the start of the evening session.

Held some time after the 2012 Summer Olympics, a number of elite European cyclists, notably from Great Britain and France were not in attendance, either through retirement or a rest period. In their absence, the medal table was headed by Germany and the east European track powers; Russia, Belarus and hosts Lithuania.

== Schedule ==
The competition days were split into two Sessions.

Date	Time	Round
19 October 2012
19 October 2012	Afternoon session	
19 October 2012	13:00	Women's Team pursuit qualifying
19 October 2012	13:35	Men's Team pursuit qualifying
19 October 2012	14:27	Women's Team sprint qualifying
19 October 2012	14:35	Men's Team sprint qualifying
19 October 2012	14:55	Men's Points race qualifying
19 October 2012	Evening session	
19 October 2012	19:30	Women's Team pursuit final
19 October 2012	19:45	Men's Team pursuit final
19 October 2012	20:16	Women's Team sprint final
19 October 2012	20:22	Men's Team sprint final
19 October 2012	20:38	Women's Points race final
19 October 2012	21:13	Men's Points race final
21 October 2012
21 October 2012	Morning session	
21 October 2012	10:00	Women's Omnium individual pursuit
21 October 2012	10:25	Men's Omnium individual pursuit
21 October 2012	11:11	Men's Keirin round 1
21 October 2012	11:27	Women's Keirin round 1
21 October 2012	11:45	Men's Keirin repechages
21 October 2012	12:01	Women's Omnium scratch
21 October 2012	12:16	Men's Omnium scratch
21 October 2012	Evening session	
21 October 2012	17:00	Men's Keirin round 2
21 October 2012	17:10	Women's Omnium time trial
21 October 2012	17:20	Men's Omnium time trial
21 October 2012	18:01	Women's Keirin finals
21 October 2012	18:09	Men's Keirin finals
21 October 2012	18:17	Men's Madison final

Date	Time	Round
20 October 2012
20 October 2012	Morning session	
20 October 2012	10:00	Men's sprint qualifying
20 October 2012	10:40	Women's sprint qualifying
20 October 2012	10:55	Men's Sprint 1/16 Final
20 October 2012	11:41	Men's Sprint 1/8 Final
20 October 2012	12:09	Men's Sprint 1/8 Final repechages
20 October 2012	12:15	Women's Omnium flying lap
20 October 2012	12:30/13:14/13:48	Women's Sprint 1/4 Final
20 October 2012	12:42/13:26/13:51	Men's Sprint 1/4 Final
20 October 2012	12:54	Men's Omnium flying lap
20 October 2012	13:54	Women's Omnium points race
20 October 2012	Evening session	
20 October 2012	19:30/20:22/20:47	Women's Sprint 1/2 Final
20 October 2012	19:36/20:28/20:50	Men's Sprint 1/2 Final
20 October 2012	19:42	Men's Omnium points race
20 October 2012	20:34	Women's Omnium elimination race
20 October 2012	20:53	Women's Sprint 5 to 8th places
20 October 2012	20:56	Men's Sprint 5 to 8th places
20 October 2012	21:06/21:33/21:42	Women's Sprint Finals
20 October 2012	21:12/21:39/21:45	Men's Sprint Finals
20 October 2012	21:18	Men's Omnium elimination race

== Events ==
Event	Gold		Silver		Bronze	
Men's events
Sprint	Denis Dmitriev; Russia		Max Niederlag; Germany		Christos Volikakis; Greece	
Team sprint	Germany; Tobias Wächter; Joachim Eilers; Max Niederlag	44.381	Poland; Kamil Kuczyński; Maciej Bielecki; Krzysztof Maksel	44.892	Great Britain; Matthew Crampton; Callum Skinner; Lewis Oliva	45.081
Keirin	Tobias Wächter; Germany		Joachim Eilers; Germany		Denis Dmitriev; Russia	
Omnium	Lucas Liss; Germany	17	Artur Ershov; Russia	20	Gediminas Bagdonas; Lithuania	34
Team pursuit	Russia; Artur Ershov; Alexei Markov; Alexander Serov; Valery Kaykov	4:00.641	Germany; Lucas Liss; Henning Bommel; Theo Reinhardt; Maximilian Beyer	4:08.654	Italy; Elia Viviani; Paolo Simion; Liam Bertazzo; Ignazio Moser; Michele Scartezzini	4:06.380
Points race non-Olympic	Elia Viviani; Italy	44	Kirill Sveshnikov; Russia	26	Sergiy Lagkuti; Ukraine	25
Madison	Czech Republic; Martin Bláha; Jiří Hochmann		Russia; Artur Ershov; Valery Kaykov		Italy; Angelo Ciccone; Elia Viviani	
Women's events
Sprint	Olga Panarina; Belarus		Anastasiia Voinova; Russia		Simona Krupeckaitė; Lithuania	
Team sprint	Lithuania; Simona Krupeckaitė; Gintarė Gaivenytė	33.846	Russia; Anastasiia Voinova; Daria Shmeleva	33.882	France; Sandie Clair; Olivia Montauban	34.975
Keirin	Simona Krupeckaitė; Lithuania		Ekaterina Gnidenko; Russia		Elena Brezhniva; Russia	
Omnium	Aušrinė Trebaitė; Lithuania		Katarzyna Pawłowska; Poland		Tamara Balabolina; Russia	
Team pursuit	Lithuania; Aušrinė Trebaitė; Vilija Sereikaitė; Vaida Pikauskaitė	3:25.237 (NR)	Poland; Katarzyna Pawłowska; Eugenia Bujak; Małgorzata Wojtyra	3:27.086	Belarus; Tatsiana Sharakova; Alena Dylko; Aksana Papko	3:24.801
Points race non-Olympic	Stephanie Pohl; Germany	33 +1 lap	Evgenia Romanyuta; Russia	25	Elke Gebhardt; Germany	20

- shaded events are non-Olympic

== Medal table ==
Rank	Nation	Gold	Silver	Bronze	Total
1	Germany	4	3	1	8
2	Lithuania	4	0	2	6
3	Russia	2	7	3	12
4	Italy	1	0	2	3
5	Belarus	1	0	1	2
6	Czech Republic	1	0	0	1
7	Poland	0	3	0	3
8	France	0	0	1	1
8	Great Britain	0	0	1	1
8	Greece	0	0	1	1
8	Ukraine	0	0	1	1
Totals (11 entries)		13	13	13	39

== Participating nations ==
146 riders from 21 nations will participate.

- Austria
- Belarus
- Belgium
- Bulgaria
- Czech Republic
- Estonia
- Finland
- France
- Georgia
- Germany
- Great Britain
- Greece
- Ireland
- Italy
- Lithuania
- Netherlands, see: Netherlands at the 2012 European Track Championships
- Poland
- Russia
- Slovakia
- Switzerland
- Ukraine
