= 2020 Paris–Tours =

2020 UCI Europe Tour 2020 UCI ProSeries

Race details
- Dates: 11 October 2020
- Distance: 213 km (132 mi)
- Winning time: 4h 51' 44"

Results
	Winner	Casper Pedersen (DEN)	(Team Sunweb)
	Second	Benoît Cosnefroy (FRA)	(AG2R La Mondiale)
	Third	Joris Nieuwenhuis (NED)	(Team Sunweb)

The 2020 Paris–Tours was the 114th edition of the Paris–Tours cycling classic. The race was held on 11 October 2020 as part of the 2020 UCI Europe Tour and the 2020 UCI ProSeries. Casper Pedersen, who was making his Paris–Tours debut, beat Benoît Cosnefroy, whose previous best result was third in 2018, in a two-up sprint to take the win. Pedersen's teammate Joris Nieuwenhuis, who was also making his Paris–Tours debut, won the bunch sprint from a group of five to finish third.

== Teams ==
Four UCI WorldTeams, sixteen UCI ProTeams, and two UCI Continental teams made up the twenty-two teams that participated in the race. Several teams entered less than the maximum of seven riders; Caja Rural–Seguros RGA, Groupama–FDJ, and Team Sunweb entered six each, while Cofidis and Rally Cycling entered five each. Of the 147 riders who entered the race, 124 finished.

UCI WorldTeams

- AG2R La Mondiale
- Cofidis
- Groupama–FDJ
- Team Sunweb

UCI Professional Continental teams

- Alpecin–Fenix
- Arkéa–Samsic
- B&B Hotels–Vital Concept
- Bingoal–Wallonie Bruxelles
- Burgos BH
- Caja Rural–Seguros RGA
- Circus–Wanty Gobert
- Euskaltel–Euskadi
- Gazprom–RusVelo
- Nippo–Delko–One Provence
- Rally Cycling
- Riwal Securitas
- Sport Vlaanderen–Baloise
- Team Novo Nordisk
- Total Direct Énergie
- Uno-X Pro Cycling Team

UCI Continental teams

- Natura4Ever–Roubaix–Lille Métropole
- St. Michel–Auber93

== Results ==
Result
Rank	Rider	Team	Time
1	Casper Pedersen (DEN)	Team Sunweb	4h 51' 44"
2	Benoît Cosnefroy (FRA)	AG2R La Mondiale	+ 0"
3	Joris Nieuwenhuis (NED)	Team Sunweb	+ 30"
4	Valentin Madouas (FRA)	Groupama–FDJ	+ 30"
5	Warren Barguil (FRA)	Arkéa–Samsic	+ 30"
6	Petr Vakoč (CZE)	Alpecin–Fenix	+ 30"
7	Romain Bardet (FRA)	AG2R La Mondiale	+ 30"
8	August Jensen (NOR)	Riwal Securitas	+ 2' 11"
9	Maurits Lammertink (NED)	Circus–Wanty Gobert	+ 2' 11"
10	Rudy Molard (FRA)	Groupama–FDJ	+ 2' 11"
