= Alexander Evtushenko =

Russian cyclist

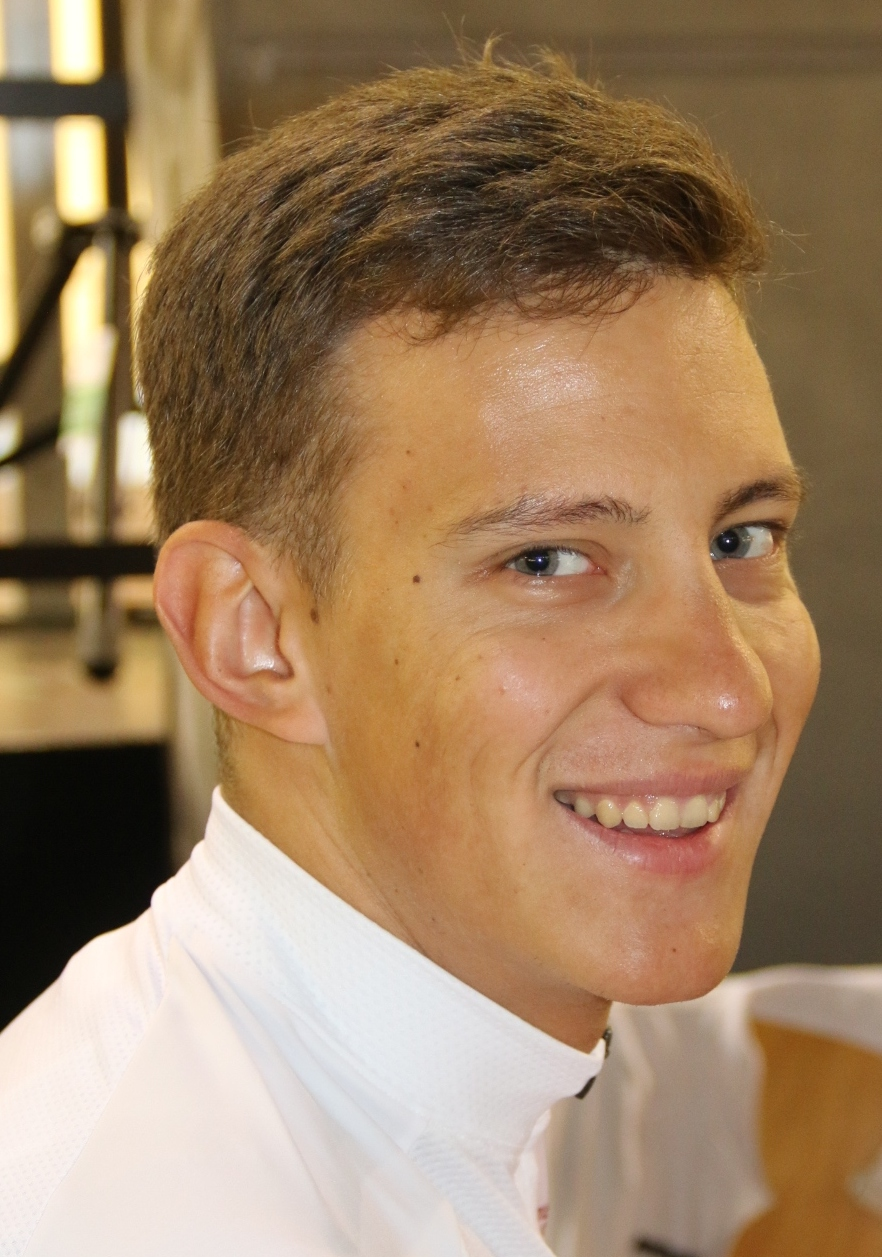
- Evtushenko in 2017

Personal information
- Full name: Alexander Alexandrovich Evtushenko
- Born: 30 June 1993 (age 33) Maykop, Russia
- Height: 1.85 m (6 ft 1 in)
- Weight: 72 kg (159 lb)

Cycling career
- Sport: Cycling
- Disciplines: Road; Track
- Role: Rider
- Rider type: Time-trialist

Professional teams
- 2013–2014: Russian Helicopters
- 2013: RusVelo (stagiaire)
- 2015–2016: RusVelo
- 2017–2018: Lokosphinx
- 2019: Gazprom–RusVelo
- 2020: Spor Toto Cycling Team
Medal record
Men's track cycling
Representing Russia
World Championships
Bronze medal – third place	2018 Apeldoorn	Individual pursuit
European Championships
Gold medal – first place	2020 Plovdiv	Team pursuit
Silver medal – second place	2014 Baie-Mahault	Individual pursuit
Bronze medal – third place	2017 Berlin	Team pursuit
U23 & Junior European Championships
Silver medal – second place	2013 Anadia	U23 Individual pursuit
Silver medal – second place	2014 Anadia	U23 Team pursuit
Representing Russia
Men's road racing
European Championships
Bronze medal – third place	2014 Nyon	U23 Time trial

Alexander Alexandrovich Evtushenko (Russian: Александр Александрович Евтушенко; born 30 June 1993) is a Russian professional racing cyclist, who last rode for UCI Continental team Spor Toto Cycling Team, despite news that he would join Efapel for the 2021 season. He rode at the 2015 UCI Track Cycling World Championships.

== Major results ==
2013
1st Time trial, National Under-23 Road Championships
10th Chrono Champenois
2014
1st Time trial, National Under-23 Road Championships
1st Stage 3 (ITT) Grand Prix of Sochi
2nd Individual pursuit, UEC European Track Championships
2nd Team pursuit, UEC European Under-23 Track Championships
3rd Time trial, UEC European Under-23 Road Championships
2015
1st Time trial, National Under-23 Road Championships
2017
National Track Championships

1st Individual pursuit
1st Team pursuit
2nd Points race

1st Stage 1 Vuelta a Castilla y León
2nd Overall GP Beiras e Serra da Estrela

1st Stage 1

3rd Team pursuit, UEC European Track Championships
2018
National Track Championships

1st Individual pursuit
1st Team pursuit

1st Giro del Medio Brenta
1st Mountains classification Volta ao Alentejo
3rd Individual pursuit, UCI Track World Championships
8th Klasika Primavera
8th Gran Premio FECOCI
2019
1st Individual pursuit, National Track Championships
2020
1st Team pursuit, UEC European Track Championships
2021
1st Prologue Five Rings of Moscow
