= Daniel Hartvig =

Danish cyclist

Personal information
- Full name: Daniel Henning Hartvig
- Born: 4 August 1996 (age 30) Denmark

Cycling career
- Sport: Cycling
- Discipline: Track cycling
Medal record
Representing Denmark
European Track Championships
Bronze medal – third place	2015 Grenchen	Team pursuit

Daniel Henning Hartvig (born 4 August 1996) is a track cyclist from Denmark. In 2015 he competed at the 2015 UCI Track Cycling World Championships in the men's team pursuit. He won the bronze medal in the team pursuit at the 2015 UEC European Track Championships in Grenchen, Switzerland.

== Major results ==
2015
3rd Team pursuit, UEC European Track Championships
