= 2015 UEC European Track Championships =

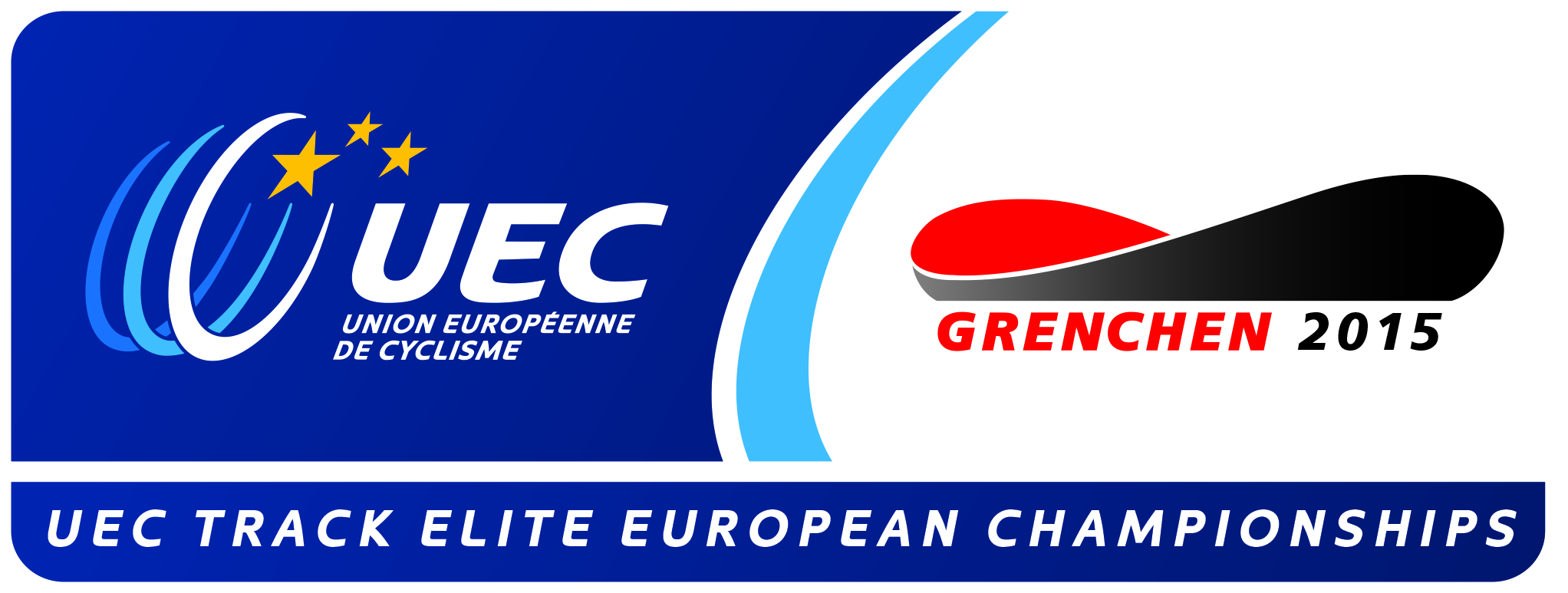
- Venue: Grenchen, Switzerland
- Date(s): 14–18 October 2015
- Velodrome: Velodrome Suisse
- Nations participating: 27
- Cyclists participating: 225 (98 women, 157 men)
- Events: 21 (10 women, 11 men)

The 2015 UEC European Track Championships was the sixth edition of the elite UEC European Track Championships in track cycling and took place at the Velodrome Suisse in Grenchen, Switzerland, between 14 and 18 October. The Event was organised by the European Cycling Union. All European champions are awarded the UEC European Champion jersey which may be worn by the champion throughout the year when competing in the same event at other competitions.

The 10 Olympic events (sprint, team sprint, team pursuit, keirin and omnium for men and women), as well as 11 other events are on the program for these European Championships. For the first time, the elimination races, known within track cycling as Devils (from the saying Devil take the hindmost) were contested in their own right.

== Participating nations ==
255 cyclists (98 women, 157 men) from 27 nations enrolled for the championships. The number of entrants per nation is shown in parentheses.

- Austria (3: 3 ♂)
- Azerbaijan (2: 1 ♂, 1 ♀)
- Belgium (9: 6 ♂, 3 ♀)
- Belarus (15: 10 ♂, 5 ♀)
- Bulgaria (3: 3 ♂)
- Czech Republic (13: 11 ♂, 2 ♀)
- Denmark (7: 6 ♂, 1 ♀)
- Spain (14: 8 ♂, 6 ♀)
- Finland (4: 2 ♂, 2 ♀)
- France (17: 10 ♂, 7 ♀)
- Great Britain (20: 12 ♂, 8 ♀)
- Georgia (1: 1 ♂)
- Germany (20: 12 ♂, 8 ♀)
- Greece (4: 3 ♂, 1 ♀)
- Hungary (2: 2 ♂)
- Ireland (13: 6 ♂, 7 ♀)
- Italy (16: 8 ♂, 8 ♀)
- Lithuania (8: 2 ♂, 6 ♀)
- Netherlands (12: 9 ♂, 3 ♀)
- Norway (3: 2 ♂, 1 ♀)
- Poland (17: 8 ♂, 9 ♀)
- Portugal (2: 2 ♂)
- Russia (22: 12 ♂, 10 ♀)
- Switzerland (10: 8 ♂, 2 ♀) (host)
- Slovakia (1: 1 ♀)
- Turkey (2: 2 ♂)
- Ukraine (15: 8 ♂, 7 ♀)

== Schedule ==
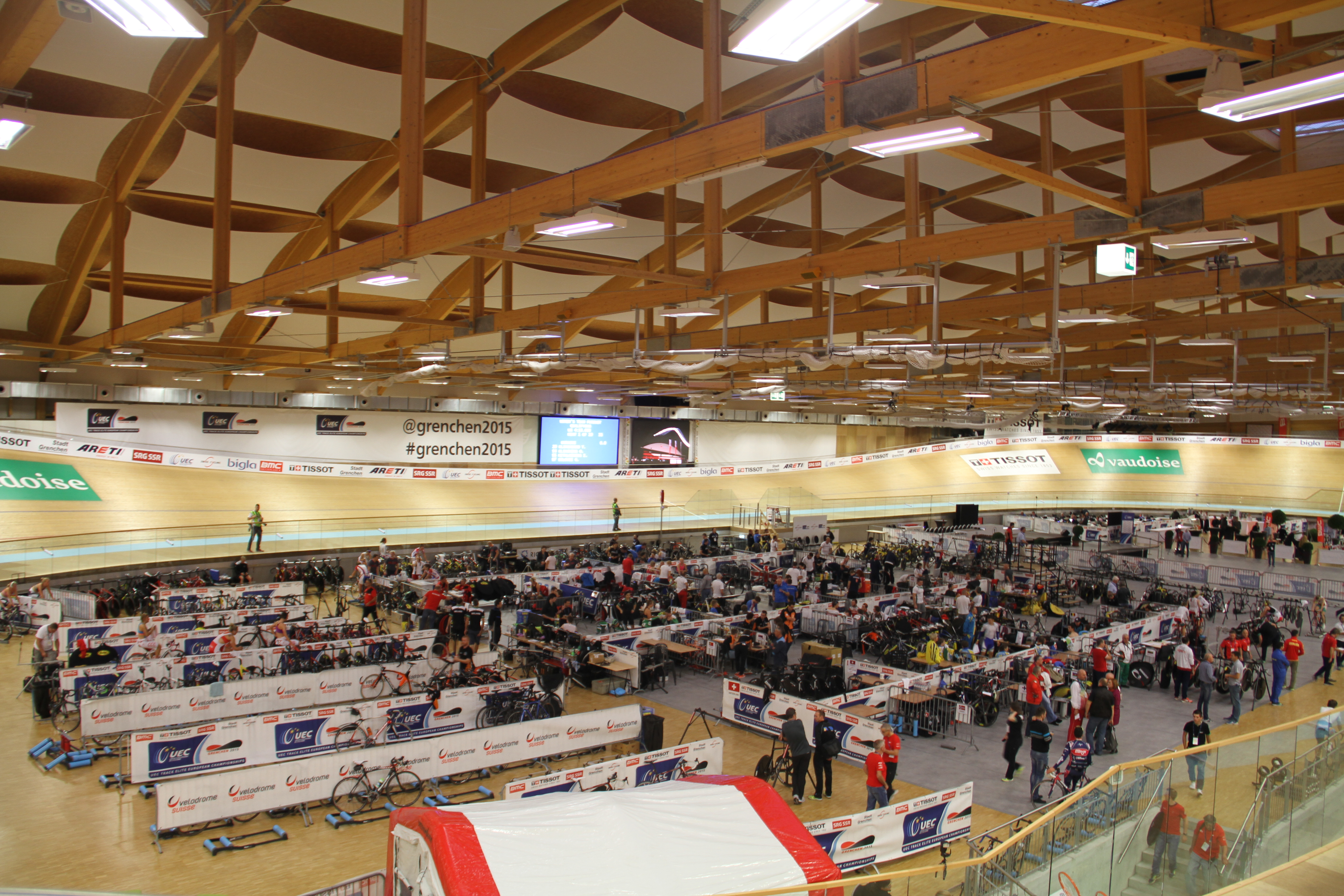
Interior of Velodrome Suisse during the Championships

Schedule only indicating the finals.

Date	Men's finals	Women's finals
Wednesday 14 October	—	—
Thursday 15 October	Team sprint, Team pursuit, Scratch	Team sprint, Team pursuit, points race
Friday 16 October	Sprint, Points race	Scratch, Sprint
Saturday 17 October	1 km time trial, Elimination race, Individual pursuit, Omnium	500 m time trial
Sunday 18 October	Keirin, Madison	Keirin, Individual pursuit, Omnium, Elimination race

== Events ==
Event	Gold		Silver		Bronze	
Men's events
Sprint	Jeffrey Hoogland; Netherlands		Max Niederlag; Germany		Damian Zieliński; Poland	
Team Sprint	Netherlands; Nils van 't Hoenderdaal; Jeffrey Hoogland; Hugo Haak	43.232	Poland; Grzegorz Drejgier; Rafał Sarnecki; Krzysztof Maksel	43.358	Germany; Joachim Eilers; Max Niederlag; Robert Förstemann; Maximilian Levy	43.210
Team Pursuit	Great Britain; Jonathan Dibben; Owain Doull; Andy Tennant; Bradley Wiggins; Steven Burke; Matthew Gibson	3:55.243	Switzerland; Silvan Dillier; Stefan Küng; Frank Pasche; Théry Schir	3:57.245	Denmark; Lasse Norman Hansen; Daniel Hartvig; Casper Pedersen; Rasmus Quaade; Mathias Møller Nielsen	3:57.930
Keirin	Pavel Kelemen; Czech Republic		François Pervis; France		Denis Dmitriev; Russia	
Omnium	Elia Viviani; Italy	191 pts	Lasse Norman Hansen; Denmark	191 pts	Jonathan Dibben; Great Britain	188 pts
Pursuit^{[O]}	Stefan Küng; Switzerland	4:14.992	Domenic Weinstein; Germany	4:17.775	Dion Beukeboom; Netherlands	4:21.669
1 km Time Trial^{[O]}	Jeffrey Hoogland; Netherlands	1:00.350	Joachim Eilers; Germany	1:00.569	Robin Wagner; Czech Republic	1:01.057
Points Race^{[O]}	Wojciech Pszczolarski; Poland	24	Benjamin Thomas; France	21	Claudio Imhof; Switzerland	19
Scratch Race^{[O]}	Sebastián Mora; Spain		Tristan Marguet; Switzerland		Adrian Tekliński; Poland	
Elimination Race^{[O]}	Bryan Coquard; France		Simone Consonni; Italy		Christopher Latham; Great Britain	
Madison^{[N]}	Spain; Sebastián Mora; Albert Torres	12	Russia; Mikhail Radionov; Andrey Sazanov	0	France; Morgan Kneisky; Bryan Coquard	24 (-1 lap)
Women's events
Sprint	Elis Ligtlee; Netherlands		Anastasiia Voinova; Russia		Kristina Vogel; Germany	
Team Sprint	Russia; Anastasiia Voinova; Daria Shmeleva	32.443	Germany; Miriam Welte; Kristina Vogel	33.013	Netherlands; Laurine van Riessen; Elis Ligtlee	33.091
Team Pursuit	Great Britain; Laura Trott; Katie Archibald; Elinor Barker; Joanna Rowsell; Ciara Horne	4:17.010	Russia; Gulnaz Badykova; Tamara Balabolina; Aleksandra Chekina; Maria Savitskaya; Evgenia Romanyuta; Aleksandra Goncharova	OVL	Belarus; Katsiaryna Piatrouskaya; Polina Pivavarava; Ina Savenka; Marina Shmayankova	4:32.595
Keirin	Elis Ligtlee; Netherlands		Virginie Cueff; France		Ekaterina Gnidenko; Russia	
Omnium	Laura Trott; Great Britain	231	Amalie Dideriksen; Denmark	195	Aušrinė Trebaitė; Lithuania	185
Pursuit^{[O]}	Katie Archibald; Great Britain	3:32.832	Élise Delzenne; France	3:37.331	Ciara Horne; Great Britain	3:35.288
500 m Time Trial^{[O]}	Anastasiia Voinova; Russia	32.794; WR	Elis Ligtlee; Netherlands	33.561	Daria Shmeleva; Russia	33.842
Scratch Race^{[O]}	Laura Trott; Great Britain		Kirsten Wild; Netherlands		Roxane Fournier; France	
Points Race^{[O]}	Katarzyna Pawłowska; Poland	46	Élise Delzenne; France	35	Stephanie Pohl; Germany	32
Elimination Race^{[O]}	Katie Archibald; Great Britain		Annalisa Cucinotta; Italy		Irene Usabiaga; Spain	

=== Notes ===
- Competitors named in italics only participated in rounds prior to the final.
- ^{^{O}} In the Olympics, all shaded events (except the madison) are contested within the omnium only.
- ^{^{N}} The madison is not contested in the Olympics.

== Medal table ==
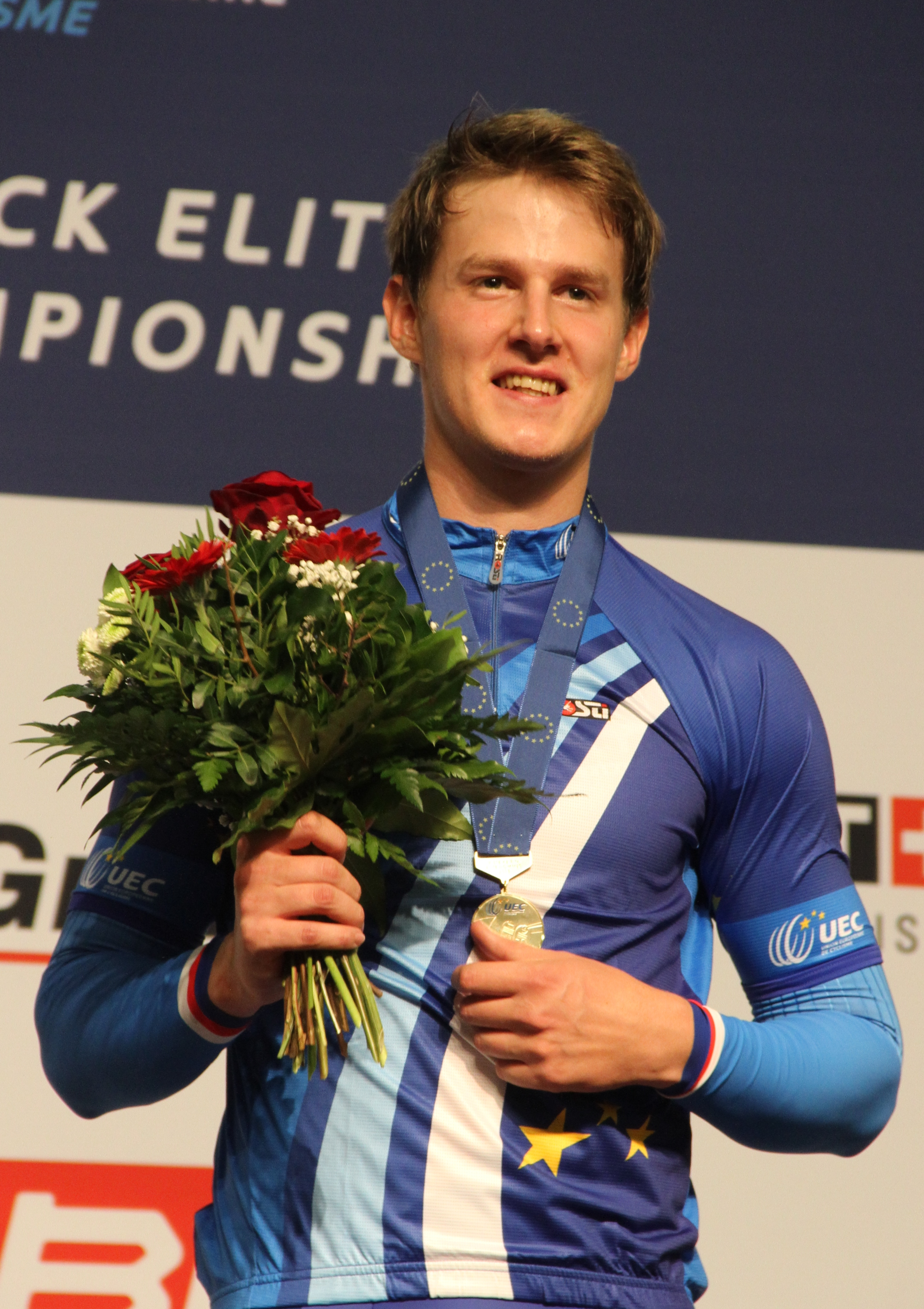
Pavel Kelemen, one of the gold medal winners

* Host nation (Switzerland)

Rank	Nation	Gold	Silver	Bronze	Total
1	Great Britain (GBR)	6	0	3	9
2	Netherlands (NED)	5	2	2	9
3	Russia (RUS)	2	3	3	8
4	Poland (POL)	2	1	2	5
5	Spain (ESP)	2	0	1	3
6	France (FRA)	1	5	2	8
7	Switzerland (SUI)*	1	2	1	4
8	Italy (ITA)	1	2	0	3
9	Czech Republic (CZE)	1	0	1	2
10	Germany (GER)	0	4	3	7
11	Denmark (DEN)	0	2	1	3
12	Belarus (BLR)	0	0	1	1
12	Lithuania (LTU)	0	0	1	1
Totals (13 entries)		21	21	21	63
