= Andy Tennant (cyclist) =

English cyclist

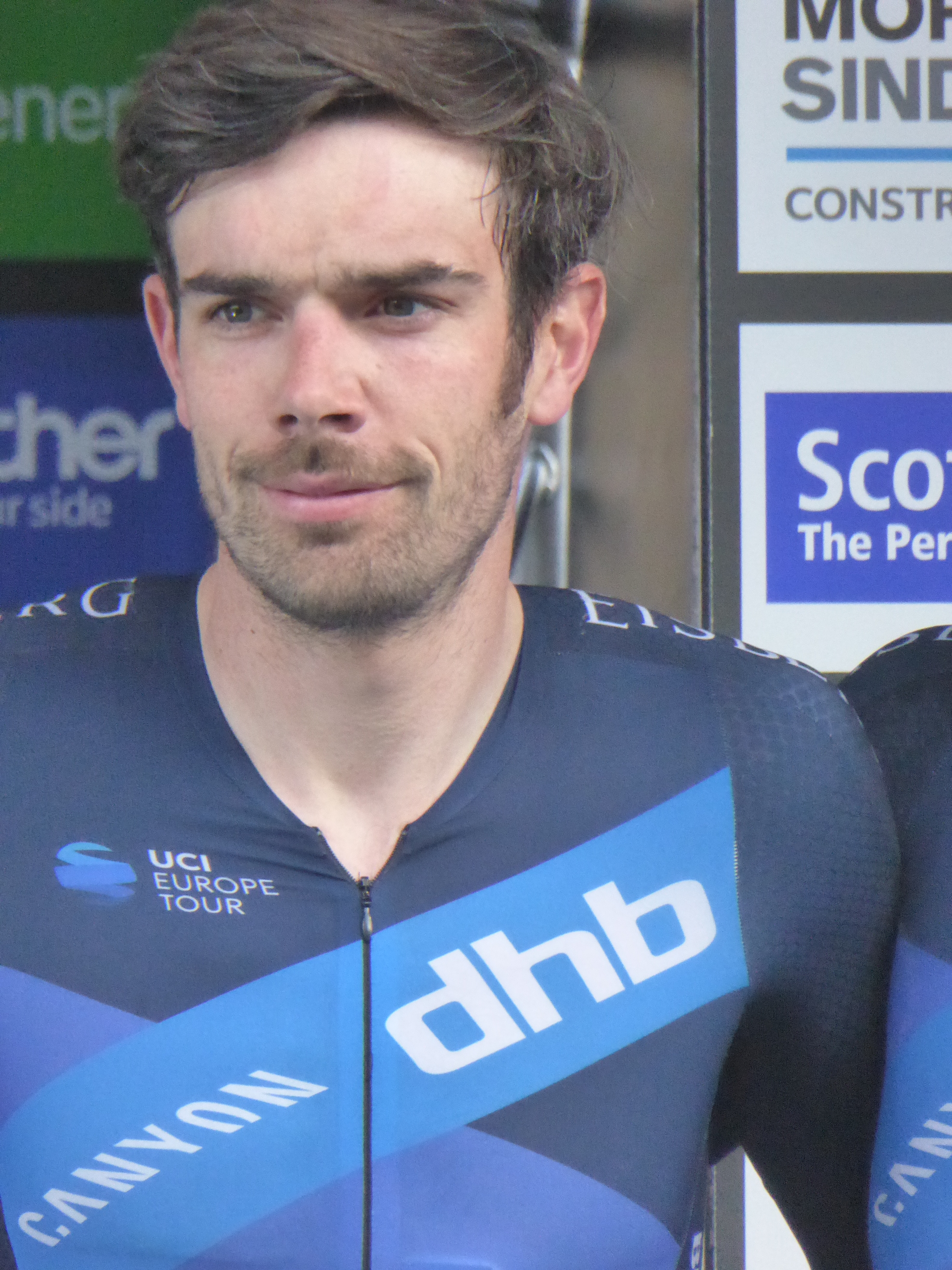
- Tennant in 2019

Personal information
- Full name: Andrew David Tennant
- Born: 9 March 1987 (age 39) Wolverhampton, England
- Height: 192 cm (6 ft 4 in)
- Weight: 82 kg (181 lb)

Cycling career
- Sport: Cycling
- Current team: Retired
- Disciplines: Track; Road
- Role: Rider; Directeur sportif
- Rider type: Pursuitist (track)

Amateur teams
- 2005: Fred Williams Cycles
- 2006: Recycling.co.uk – SIS
- 2007–2008: Team 100% ME

Professional teams
- 2009: Team Halfords
- 2010: Motorpoint–Marshalls Pasta
- 2011–2012: Rapha Condor–Sharp
- 2013–2014: Madison Genesis
- 2015–2017: WIGGINS
- 2018–2021: Canyon Eisberg

Managerial team
- 2023: AT85 Pro Cycling

Major wins
- Track Team pursuit, World Championships (2012)
Medal record
Representing Great Britain
World Championships
Gold medal – first place	2012 Melbourne	Team pursuit
Silver medal – second place	2010 Ballerup	Team pursuit
Silver medal – second place	2013 Minsk	Team pursuit
Silver medal – second place	2015 Yvelines	Team pursuit
Silver medal – second place	2016 London	Team pursuit
Bronze medal – third place	2011 Apeldoorn	Team pursuit
Bronze medal – third place	2016 London	Individual pursuit
European Championships
Gold medal – first place	2010 Pruszków	Team pursuit
Gold medal – first place	2011 Apeldoorn	Team pursuit
Gold medal – first place	2013 Apeldoorn	Team pursuit
Gold medal – first place	2014 Guadeloupe	Team pursuit
Gold medal – first place	2014 Guadeloupe	Individual pursuit
Gold medal – first place	2015 Grenchen	Team pursuit
Representing England
Commonwealth Games
Silver medal – second place	2014 Glasgow	Team pursuit

Andrew David Tennant (born 9 March 1987) is an English former professional track and road racing cyclist, who rode professionally between 2009 and 2021 for six different teams. During his career, Tennant won seven medals at the UCI Track Cycling World Championships, six gold medals at the UEC European Track Championships and a silver medal at the 2014 Commonwealth Games.

== Biography ==
Born in Wolverhampton, West Midlands, UK, Tennant began to make his mark on the cycling world as a junior rider. In 2005 he was selected for British Cycling's Olympic Development Programme and lived in Tuscany, Italy with the GB squad in 2006. Tennant represented England in the points race at the 2006 Commonwealth Games and represented Great Britain in the Under-23 road race at the 2006 UCI Road World Championships in Salzburg, Austria. The following season he overtrained, and his results suffered as a consequence. Tennant was a member of British Cycling's Olympic Academy.

Whilst riding for Team Halfords Bikehut in 2009, he was mentored by Rob Hayles.

In 2015 Tennant moved to the new WIGGINS team set up by Bradley Wiggins aiming to prepare British riders for the team pursuit at the 2016 Summer Olympics.

== Major results ==
=== Road ===
2006
3rd Overall Flèche du Sud
2008
2nd Road race, National Under-23 Championships
2009
1st Overall Tour of the Reservoir
2nd Time trial, National Under-23 Championships
2nd Overall Girvan Three Day
7th Overall Cinturón a Mallorca
2011
1st Richmond Grand Prix
9th Overall Tour de Korea
10th London–Surrey Cycle Classic
2015
1st Wiltshire GP
1st Stage 2 Flèche du Sud
2nd Milk Race
3rd Overall Tour of the Reservoir
5th London Nocturne
2018
1st Durham, Tour Series

=== Track ===
2005
UCI World Junior Championships

1st Individual pursuit
2nd Team pursuit

1st Team pursuit, UEC European Junior Championships
1st Individual pursuit, National Junior Championships
2006
1st Team pursuit, UEC European Under-23 Championships
1st UIV Cup, Stuttgart (with Ian Stannard)
3rd Team pursuit, UCI World Cup Classics, Sydney
2007
1st Team pursuit, National Championships
3rd Team pursuit, UCI World Cup Classics, Manchester
2008
1st Team pursuit, UEC European Under-23 Championships
2009
UCI World Cup Classics

1st Team pursuit, Manchester
2nd Team pursuit, Melbourne

National Championships

2nd Individual pursuit
2nd Points race

2010
1st Team pursuit, UEC European Championships
2nd Team pursuit, UCI World Championships
3rd Team pursuit, UCI World Cup Classics, Melbourne
2011
1st Team pursuit, UEC European Championships
3rd Team pursuit, UCI World Championships
2012
1st Team pursuit, UCI World Championships
2013
1st Team pursuit, UEC European Championships
1st Team pursuit, UCI World Cup, Manchester
2nd Team pursuit, UCI World Championships
2014
UEC European Championships

1st Team pursuit
1st Individual pursuit

UCI World Cup

1st Team pursuit, London
2nd Team pursuit, Guadalajara

National Championships

1st Individual pursuit
1st Madison (with Oli Wood)

2nd Team pursuit, Commonwealth Games
2015
1st Team pursuit, UEC European Championships
1st Individual pursuit, British National Championships
1st Revolution Series Round 2 (with Iljo Keisse)
2nd Team pursuit, UCI World Championships
2nd Individual pursuit, UCI World Cup, Cali
2016
1st Team pursuit, UCI World Cup, Glasgow
UCI World Championships

2nd Team pursuit
3rd Individual pursuit
