= UEC European Track Championships =

Annual international elite cycling event

European Champion Jersey

European Champion jersey

European Champion jersey until 2015

The European Track Cycling Championships are a set of elite level competition events held annually for the various disciplines and distances in track cycling, exclusively for European cyclists, and regulated by the European Cycling Union (UEC). They were first held in their current format in 2010, when elite level cyclists competed for the first time following an overhaul of European track cycling.

In line with cycling tradition, winners of an event at the championships are presented with, in addition to the gold medal, a special, identifiable jersey. This UEC European Champion jersey is a white and blue jersey with gold stars. Gold stars on a blue background have been an identifiably European symbol since the adoption of the Flag of Europe by the Council of Europe.

== Founding of the modern Elite Championships ==
In 2010 the UEC instigated a significant overhaul of how cyclists qualify for the Olympic Games. As a result, the European Championships was also introduced for elite level European cyclists. The first elite championships thereafter took place at the beginning of November 2010. It followed the same ten event schedule for the 2012 Olympics but also included the Madison "due to popular demand". Over the following decade the event grew to include a full programme of World Championship disciplines.

Prior to 2010, championship events were run under the same name, but solely for junior and under-23 cyclists, and the 2010 event is therefore recognised as the first elite level senior championships. The first European Track Championships of any description were held in Berlin in 1886 and featured only 5 km and 10 km men's scratch races. Since 2010, separate annual European championships for under-23 and junior riders have continued, but described explicitly as such.

The most successful nation since the inauguration of the elite event is Great Britain, the event's genesis coinciding with Britain's rise to dominance in world track cycling. The most successful individual rider in the history of the Elite event is Katie Archibald of Great Britain, who has won, as of the 2023 UEC European Track Championships, 20 European titles. Among nations in the championships, aside from Great Britain itself, only Russia, Germany, Netherlands and France have won more gold medals than Archibald.

== Other European track cycling competitions ==
The UEC agreed with the governing bodies of six other major European sports from 2018 to integrate its four Olympic-class events, including track cycling, into the new European Championships event on a quadrennial basis. Beginning with 2018, every fourth edition of the competition was to form part of the multi-sport event. The event, however, was cancelled in 2026 and the Championships returned to a stand-alone format.

While track cycling also forms part of the 2019 European Games in Minsk, these events are not regarded as European Championships but as the Cycling programme of the European Games, and the UEC event will also be held later in the same year. Conversely, the events held in Glasgow in 2018, and Munich in 2022 as part of the multi-sport European Championships are treated as official UEA championships

== Elite Competitions (2010-present) ==
=== Editions ===
Number	Year	Date	Country	City	Velodrome	Events
1	2010	5–7 November	Poland	Pruszków	BGŻ Arena	11
2	2011	21–23 October	Netherlands	Apeldoorn	Omnisport Apeldoorn	13
3	2012	19–21 October	Lithuania	Panevėžys	Cido Arena	13
4	2013	18–20 October	Netherlands	Apeldoorn	Omnisport Apeldoorn	13
5	2014	16–19 October	France	Baie-Mahault, Guadeloupe	Vélodrome Amédée Détraux	19
6	2015	14–18 October	Switzerland	Grenchen	Velodrome Suisse	21
7	2016	19–23 October	France	Saint-Quentin-en-Yvelines	Vélodrome de Saint-Quentin-en-Yvelines	22
8	2017	18–22 October	Germany	Berlin	Velodrom	23
9	2018 (Note: Part of the 2018 European Championships)	2–7 August	Great Britain	Glasgow	Sir Chris Hoy Velodrome	22
10	2019	16–20 October	Netherlands	Apeldoorn	Omnisport Apeldoorn	22
11	2020	11–15 November	Bulgaria	Plovdiv	Kolodruma	22
12	2021	5–9 October	Switzerland	Grenchen	Tissot Velodrome	22
13	2022 (Note: Part of the 2022 European Championships)	11–16 August	Germany	Munich	Neue Messe München	22
14	2023	8–12 February	Switzerland	Grenchen	Tissot Velodrome	22
15	2024	10–14 January	Netherlands	Apeldoorn	Omnisport Apeldoorn	22
16	2025	12–16 February	Belgium	Heusden-Zolder	Velodroom Limburg	22
17	2026	1–5 February	Turkey	Konya	Konya Velodrome	22

=== Venues ===
UEC European Track Championships is located in Europe	UEC European Track Championships is located in the Caribbean

=== All-time medal table ===
Updated to the 2026 UEC European Track Championships: Source:

Rank	Nation	Gold	Silver	Bronze	Total
1	France	64	44	38	146
2	Great Britain	64	44	34	142
3	Germany	50	49	42	141
4	Netherlands	44	30	40	114
5	Russia	31	30	32	93
6	Italy	27	31	29	87
7	Belgium	14	17	17	48
8	Denmark	13	14	8	35
9	Portugal	9	11	7	27
10	Spain	9	8	7	24
11	Poland	8	17	22	47
12	Lithuania	6	3	8	17
13	Czech Republic	5	2	9	16
14	Ukraine	4	9	14	27
15	Switzerland	4	9	6	19
16	Norway	4	2	0	6
–	Individual Neutral Athletes	3	1	4	8
17	Belarus	2	7	6	15
18	Ireland	1	2	4	7
19	Austria	1	1	1	3
20	Greece	0	3	3	6
21	Israel	0	1	1	2
22	Hungary	0	1	0	1
23	Romania	0	0	1	1
Totals (23 entries)		363	336	333	1,032

=== Most successful riders ===
Below is a table of the most successful male and female riders at the European Track Cycling Championships from 2010 onwards. The most successful rider of either sex is Katie Archibald, with 21 European titles and 28 medals; in the history of the Championships, only Germany, Netherlands, France, Italy and Russia, in addition to her own nation, have won more gold medals than Archibald. The most successful male athlete is Dutch sprinter Jeffrey Hoogland on 14 gold medals and 18 medals total, the same numbers as Archibald's Madison and team pursuit partner Laura Kenny. Kenny was the first rider to reach ten championship jerseys, a feat only equalled by Archibald, their fellow Brit Elinor Barker, Hoogland, and Russian sprint pair Anastasia Voynova and Daria Shmeleva.

up to date after 2023 UEC European Track Championships.

==== Male ====
No	Athlete	Nation	1st place, gold medalist(s)	2nd place, silver medalist(s)	3rd place, bronze medalist(s)	Total	Years	Events
1	Jeffrey Hoogland	Netherlands	15	2	2	19	2015–2024	Team sprint, sprint, Kilo and keirin
2	Harrie Lavreysen	Netherlands	14	2	2	18	2017–2025	Team sprint, sprint and keirin
3	Ben Thomas	France	9	2	4	15	2014–2023	Team pursuit, Points race, Scratch race and omnium
4	Elia Viviani	Italy	8	1	3	12	2012–2022	Team pursuit, Points Race, Eliminator, omnium and Madison
5	Maximilian Levy	Germany	6	2	1	9	2010–2020	team sprint, sprint, keirin
5	Roy van den Berg	Netherlands	6	1	1	8	2016–2024	Team sprint, sprint
5	Sebastián Mora	Spain	6	0	1	7	2015–2022	Scratch race, Points race, Madison and omnium.
5	Andy Tennant	Great Britain	6	0	0	6	2010–2016	Team pursuit, individual pursuit.

==== Female ====
No	Athlete	Nation	1st place, gold medalist(s)	2nd place, silver medalist(s)	3rd place, bronze medalist(s)	Total	Years	Events
1	Katie Archibald	Great Britain	20	5	1	26	2013–2023	Team pursuit, individual pursuit, Scratch race, points race, eliminator, omnium and Madison.
2	Laura Kenny	Great Britain	14	3	1	18	2010–2020	Team pursuit, Scratch race, Eliminator, omnium and Madison.
3	Anastasia Voynova	Russia	13	6	2	21	2012–2021	Team sprint, sprint and 500 m time trial
4	Daria Shmeleva	Russia	12	3	6	21	2012–2021	Team sprint, sprint, keirin and 500 m time trial
5	Elinor Barker	Great Britain	10	2	1	13	2013–2023	Team pursuit, Eliminator, Madison and Scratch race.

==== Golden 'hat-tricks'. ====
No rider has won four gold medals at a single championships. The following riders have won a 'hat-trick' of three gold medals at a single championships on at least one occasion, the first being the Russian sprinter Anastasia Voynova in 2014: Katie Archibald of Great Britain has achieved the feat on three separate occasions, a record, with three different combinations of events, and is the only rider to achieve such a 'hat-trick' without winning gold in either the team pursuit or team sprint. The most hat-tricks claimed in one championships was in the 2023 championships when Archibald and sprinters Harrie Lavreysen of the Netherlands, and Lea Friedrich of Germany won three golds apiece. Uniquely, all three won their respective 'Olympic' trebles by winning all three available golds in their Olympic events - Team pursuit, Omnium and Madison for Archibald, Team sprint, sprint and keirin for Lavreysen and Friedrich, a feat achieved by no rider prior to 2023. Lavreysen repeated his hat-trick in 2024, the first rider to do an 'Olympic' hat-trick twice.

Riders are listed in order of their first 'hat-trick':

Rider	Nation	Hat-tricks	Years	Events
Anastasia Voynova	Russia	2	2014	Sprint, Team sprint, 500m TT
Anastasia Voynova	Russia	2	2019	Sprint, Team sprint, 500m TT
Jeffrey Hoogland	Netherlands	2	2015	Sprint, Team sprint, Kilo
Jeffrey Hoogland	Netherlands	2	2021	Team sprint, Keirin, Kilo
Katie Archibald	Great Britain	3	2016	Team pursuit, Pursuit, Elimination race
Katie Archibald	Great Britain	3	2021	Omnium, Madison, Scratch race
Katie Archibald	Great Britain	3	2023	Team pursuit, Omnium, Madison
Harrie Lavreysen	Netherlands	2	2023	Sprint, Team sprint, Keirin
Harrie Lavreysen	Netherlands	2	2024	Sprint, Team sprint, Keirin
Laura Kenny	Great Britain	1	2016	Team pursuit, Omnium, Scratch race
Daria Shmeleva	Russia	1	2018	Sprint, Team sprint, 500m TT
Emma Hinze	Germany	1	2022	Sprint, Team sprint, 500m TT
Lea Friedrich	Germany	1	2023	Sprint, Team sprint, Keirin

==== Most successful in each event ====
22 Events are held as part of the European championships. The table below summarises the most successful athlete and nation in each of the 22 separate events. The numbers in parentheses represent the number of golds, silvers and bronze respectively won by the athlete or nation in that specific event. Athletes and nations are differentiated in the standard way, first by number of golds, then silvers, then bronze medals. Although both the Omnium and Madison had stand alone championships prior to 2010, only those contested at the European Track Cycling Championships from that year forward are included.

The most dominant rider in a single event is Laura Kenny who has won the women's team pursuit on eight occasions. This is also the event where a single nation is most dominant; Great Britain have won nine of the editions of the team pursuit, and medalled on a further two occasions. Kenny is also the most dominant rider in any event for individual riders, with four gold and two silver medals across various editions of the omnium. The records for medals in a single event is the 13 medals won by Russia in the 500 metre time trial.

Katie Archibald holds the unique distinction of having been a European Champion across seven different events; team pursuit (7), individual pursuit (4), Scratch race (1), points race (1), Eliminator (1), omnium (4) and madison (2).

This table does not include freestanding senior European Championships held prior to the 2010 UEC European Track Championships. Up to date after 2025 UEC European Track Championships.

Event	Men		Women	
Event	Best Male Athlete	Best Nation (male)	Best Female Athlete	Best Nation (female)
Team Sprint (men/women)	Jeffrey Hoogland (NED) (7/0/1)	Netherlands (7/1/1)	Anastasiia Voinova (RUS) (7/1/1) Daria Shmeleva (RUS)	Russia (8/1/1)
Sprint (men/women)	Harrie Lavreysen (NED) (4/1/1)	Netherlands (6/4/1)	Anastasiia Voinova (RUS) (3/4/0)	Russia (4/5/2)
Keirin (men/women)	Harrie Lavreysen (NED) (4/0/0)	Germany (6/2/1)	Lea Friedrich (GER) (4/1/0)	Germany (6/2/1)
Kilo/500m (men/women)	Jeffrey Hoogland (NED) (4/0/0)	Netherlands (5/2/1)	Daria Shmeleva (RUS) (4/1/2)	Russia (7/2/4)
Team pursuit (men/women)	Andy Tennant (GBR) (5/0/0)	Great Britain (6/2/5)	Laura Kenny (GBR) (8/0/0)	Great Britain (9/2/1)
Individual pursuit (men/women)	Jonathan Milan (ITA) (2/1/0)	Italy (3/3/1)	Katie Archibald (GBR) (4/1/1)	Great Britain (6/2/4)
Points Race (men/women)	Benjamin Thomas (FRA) (3/1/0)	France (4/2/2)	Lotte Kopecky (BEL) (3/0/0)	Belgium (3/4/0)
Scratch race (men/women)	Iúri Leitão (POR) (3/0/0)	Portugal (4/0/0)	Martina Fidanza (ITA) (2/0/0)	Great Britain (3/3/0)
Omnium (men/women)	Elia Viviani (ITA) (2/1/1)	Great Britain (3/1/3)	Laura Kenny (GBR) (4/2/0)	Great Britain (8/3/0)
Madison (men/women)	Roger Kluge (GER) (3/2/0)	Germany (3/2/1)	Amalie Dideriksen (DEN) (2/1/1); Julie Leth (DEN)	Great Britain (3/1/2)
Elimination (men/women)	Elia Viviani (ITA) (2/0/0); Matthew Walls (GBR)Tim Torn Teutenberg (GER)	Italy (2/1/0)	Kirsten Wild (NED) (3/0/0); Lotte Kopecky (BEL)	Great Britain (3/3/1)

== Juniors and U23's and Open Omnium ==
Exclude Men's Open Madison events from 2001 to 2009 and include Open Omnium events from 2001 to 2009.

Number	Year	Country	City	Events
as European Track Championships
1	2001	Czech Republic; Italy	Brno (Under 23); Fiorenzuola d'Arda (Junior)	25
2	2002	Germany	Buttgen	27
3	2003	Russia	Moscow	32
4	2004	Spain	Valencia	32
5	2005	Italy	Fiorenzuola d'Arda	32
6	2006	Greece	Athens	32
7	2007	Germany	Cottbus	33
8	2008	Poland	Pruszków	37
9	2009	Belarus	Minsk	37
as UEC European Track Championships (under-23 & junior)
10	2010	Russia	Saint Petersburg	38
11	2011	Portugal	Anadia	38
12	2012	Portugal	Anadia	38
13	2013	Portugal	Anadia	38
14	2014	Portugal	Anadia	38
15	2015	Greece	Athens	38
16	2016	Italy	Montichiari	38
17	2017	Portugal	Sangalhos	44
18	2018	Switzerland	Aigle	44
19	2019	Belgium	Ghent	44
20	2020	Italy	Fiorenzuola d'Arda	44
21	2021	Netherlands	Apeldoorn	44
22	2022	Portugal	Anadia	44
23	2023	Portugal	Anadia	44
24	2024	Germany	Cottbus	44
25	2025	Portugal	Anadia	44
26	2026	Germany	Cottbus	44

=== Medals (2001–2024) ===
Exclude Men's Open Madison events from 2001 to 2009 and include Open Omnium events from 2001 to 2009.

Rank	Nation	Gold	Silver	Bronze	Total
1	Russia	162	135	123	420
2	Italy	134	70	79	283
3	Great Britain	119	106	95	320
4	Germany	112	118	103	333
5	France	90	112	96	298
6	Netherlands	54	61	72	187
7	Poland	41	76	84	201
8	Belgium	41	54	48	143
9	Ukraine	39	25	23	87
10	Czech Republic	31	31	46	108
11	Switzerland	16	22	22	60
12	Denmark	15	13	11	39
13	Spain	12	13	29	54
14	Belarus	8	9	18	35
15	Lithuania	6	15	18	39
16	Portugal	5	17	8	30
17	Ireland	5	10	6	21
18	Greece	4	7	8	19
19	Austria	4	6	4	14
20	Latvia	2	1	2	5
21	Armenia	2	0	0	2
22	Moldova	1	2	1	4
23	Slovenia	1	1	1	3
23	Turkey	1	1	1	3
25	Slovakia	1	1	0	2
26	Norway	0	0	2	2
27	Israel	0	0	1	1
Totals (27 entries)		906	906	901	2,713

- 2002 Doping Case: Germany replaced by Belgium. (GER -1 Bronze / BEL +1 Bronze)

== Disciplines ==
The historic results in each discipline can be found at the relevant link below:-

Current disciplines - Men

- UEC European Track Championships – Men's team pursuit
- UEC European Track Championships – Men's individual pursuit
- UEC European Track Championships – Men's elimination race
- UEC European Track Championships – Men's points race
- UEC European Track Championships – Men's scratch race
- UEC European Track Championships – Men's omnium
- UEC European Track Championships – Men's madison
- UEC European Track Championships – Men's team sprint
- UEC European Track Championships – Men's sprint
- UEC European Track Championships – Men's keirin
- UEC European Track Championships – Men's 1 km time trial

Current disciplines - Women

- UEC European Track Championships – Women's team pursuit
- UEC European Track Championships – Women's individual pursuit
- UEC European Track Championships – Women's elimination race
- UEC European Track Championships – Women's points race
- UEC European Track Championships – Women's scratch race
- UEC European Track Championships – Women's omnium
- UEC European Track Championships – Women's madison
- UEC European Track Championships – Women's team sprint
- UEC European Track Championships – Women's sprint
- UEC European Track Championships – Women's keirin
- UEC European Track Championships – Women's 500 m time trial

Former disciplines

- UEC European Track Championships – Derny
- UEC European Track Championships – Stayer

Age-group events

- UEC European Track Championships (under-23 & junior)
