= UEC European Champion jersey =

Jersey worn by cycle race winners

European Champion Jersey

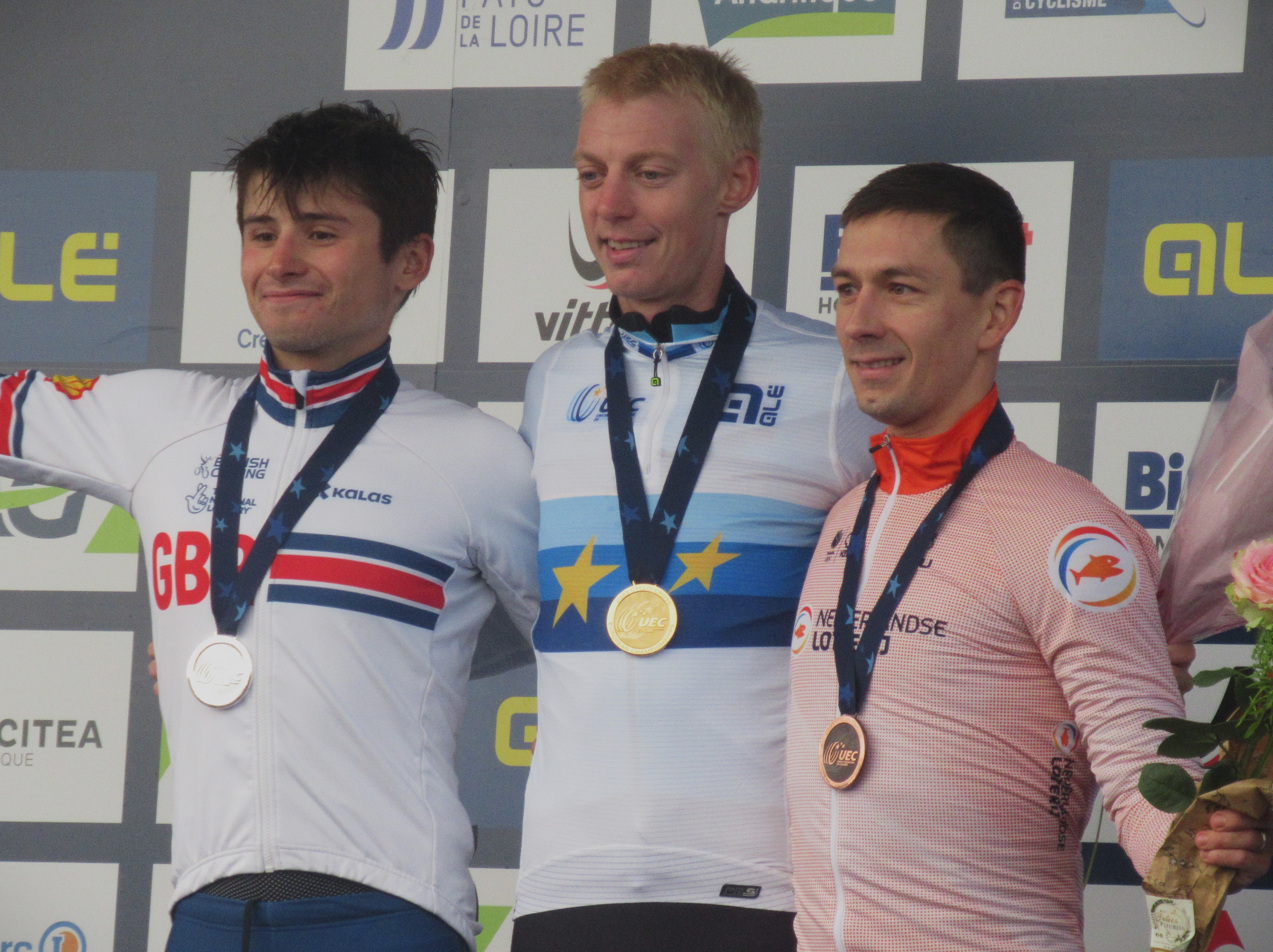
Michael Vanthourenhout in the jersey after winning it at the 2023 European CX Championship.

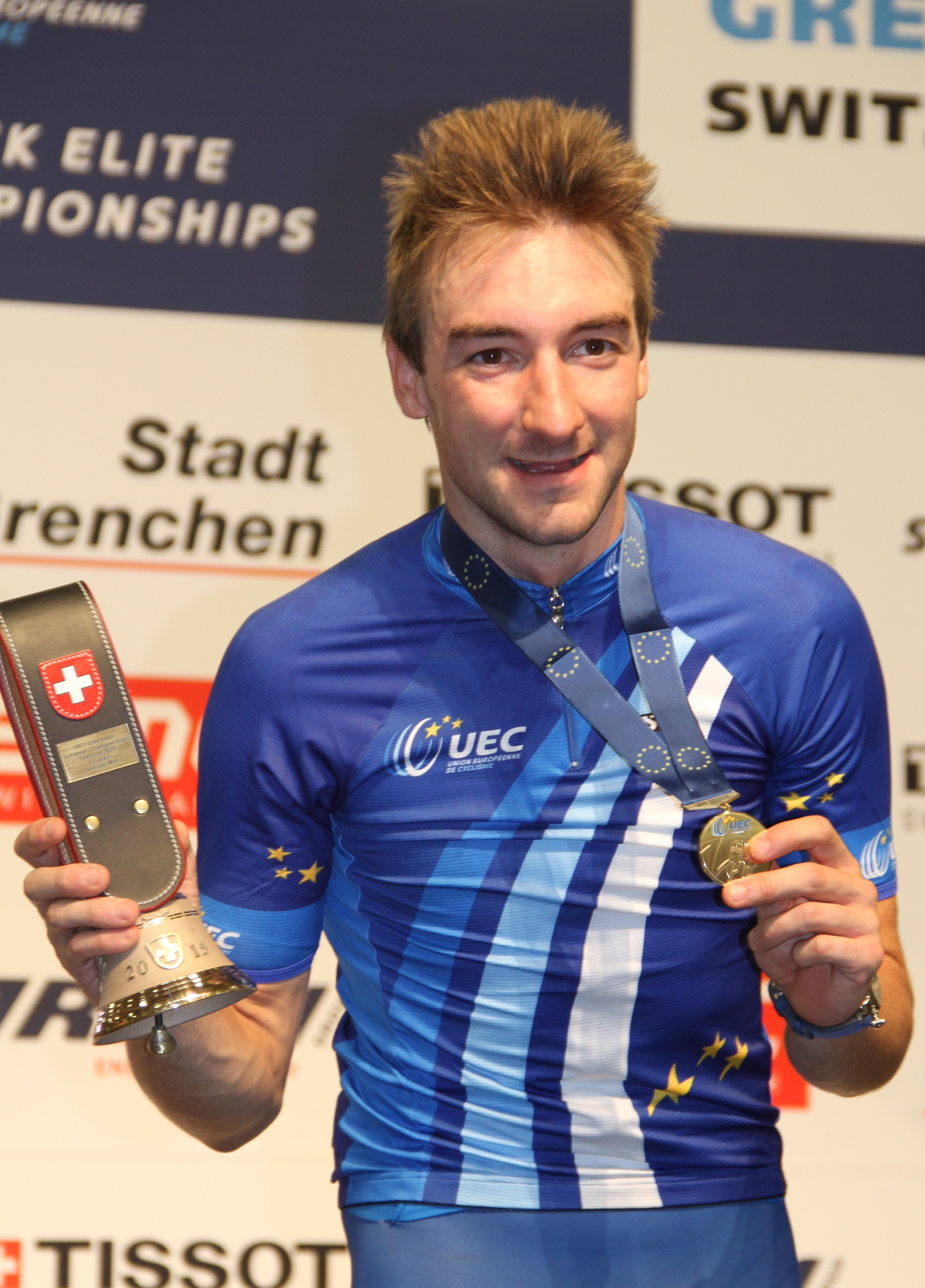
Elia Viviani in the 2014-15 jersey after winning it at the 2015 European Track Championships

The UEC European Champion jersey is the distinctive, identifiable jersey that the winner of a bicycle race receives at European Cycling Championships organized by the European Cycling Union (UEC), such as the European Road Championships and the European Track Championships. The jersey is predominantly blue with gold European stars. The jerseys are awarded in all cycling disciplines, including road cycling, track cycling, cyclo-cross, BMX, mountain biking and indoor cycling.

The jerseys are provided by Santini SMS. From 2016, its design consist of a three-part blue banner behind three yellow stars. A special version exists for champions in the Masters age category.

Champion Jersey until 2013

Champion Jersey 2014–2015

Champion Jersey since 2016

Champion Jersey for Masters

== See also ==
- Cycling jersey
- Rainbow jersey
- Distinctive jerseys in professional cycling
