= 2018 UEC European Track Championships – Men's madison =

Men's madison at the 2018 UEC European Track Championships
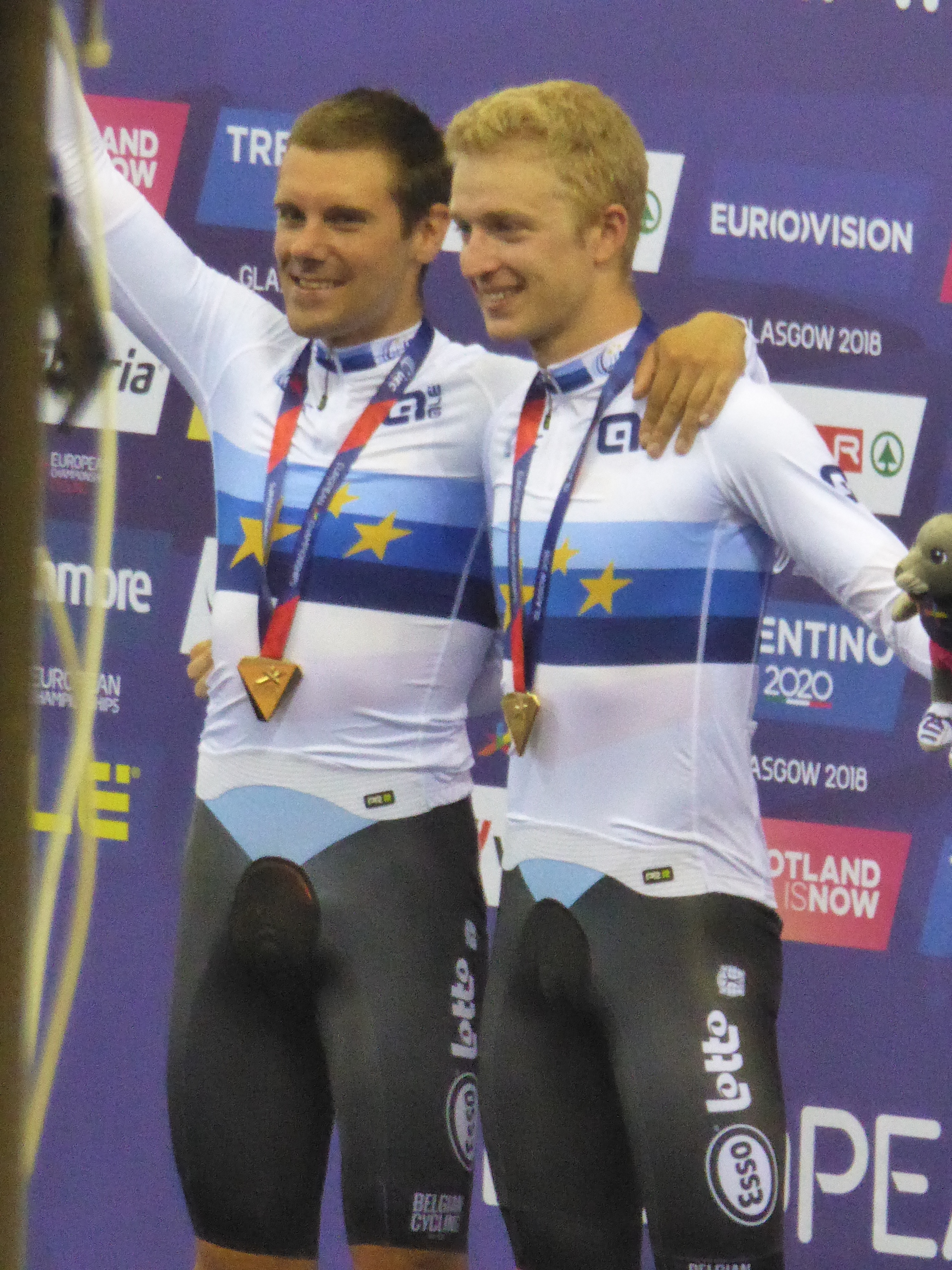
- Kenny De Ketele (left) and Robbe Ghys (right), the winners of the gold medal for Belgium
- Venue: Sir Chris Hoy Velodrome, Glasgow
- Date: 6 August
- Competitors: 38 from 19 nations
- Winning points: 60

Medalists
gold medal	Robbe Ghys; Kenny De Ketele	Belgium
silver medal	Theo Reinhardt; Roger Kluge	Germany
bronze medal	Oliver Wood; Ethan Hayter	Great Britain

The men's madison competition at the 2018 UEC European Track Championships was held on 6 August 2018.

== Results ==
=== Qualifying ===
In each heat, last two teams are not qualified for the final. 100 laps (25 km) with 10 sprints were raced.

==== Heat 1 ====
Rank	Name	Nation	Lap points	Sprint points	Total points	Finish order	Notes
1	Albert Torres; Sebastián Mora	Spain		24	24	1	Q
2	Felix English; Mark Downey	Ireland		19	19	2	Q
3	Morgan Kneisky; Benjamin Thomas	France		17	17	3	Q
4	Raman Tsishkou; Yauheni Karaliok	Belarus		16	16	8	Q
5	Robbe Ghys; Kenny De Ketele	Belgium		15	15	7	Q
6	Ivo Oliveira; Rui Oliveira	Portugal		13	13	4	Q
7	Roman Gladysh; Vitaliy Hryniv	Ukraine		8	8	5	Q
8	Théry Schir; Tristan Marguet	Switzerland		8	8	6	
	Jan Kraus; Denis Rugovac	Czech Republic	−40	0	–40	DNF	

==== Heat 2 ====
Rank	Name	Nation	Lap points	Sprint points	Total points	Finish order	Notes
1	Oliver Wood; Ethan Hayter	Great Britain		20	20	8	Q
2	Wojciech Pszczolarski; Daniel Staniszewski	Poland		18	18	1	Q
3	Francesco Lamon; Michele Scartezzini	Italy		12	12	3	Q
4	Artur Ershov; Maxim Piskunov	Russia		12	12	6	Q
5	Casper von Folsach; Oliver Frederiksen	Denmark		11	11	5	Q
6	Theo Reinhardt; Roger Kluge	Germany		9	9	7	Q
7	Roy Pieters; Wim Stroetinga	Netherlands		5	5	9	Q
8	Andreas Müller; Andreas Graf	Austria	−20	21	1	2	Q
9	Christos Volikakis; Zafeiris Volikakis	Greece	−20	12	–8	4	
	Andrej Strmiska; Filip Taragel	Slovakia	−40	0	–40	DNF	

=== Final ===
200 laps (50 km) with 20 sprints were raced.

Rank	Name	Nation	Lap points	Sprint points	Total points	Finish order
1st place, gold medalist(s)	Robbe Ghys; Kenny De Ketele	Belgium	20	40	60	4
2nd place, silver medalist(s)	Theo Reinhardt; Roger Kluge	Germany	20	29	49	5
3rd place, bronze medalist(s)	Oliver Wood; Ethan Hayter	Great Britain		38	38	1
4	Albert Torres; Sebastián Mora	Spain		33	33	11
5	Morgan Kneisky; Benjamin Thomas	France		20	20	14
6	Wojciech Pszczolarski; Daniel Staniszewski	Poland		6	6	3
7	Francesco Lamon; Michele Scartezzini	Italy		5	5	2
8	Andreas Müller; Andreas Graf	Austria		5	5	7
9	Casper von Folsach; Oliver Frederiksen	Denmark		4	4	10
10	Raman Tsishkou; Yauheni Karaliok	Belarus	−20	20	0	13
11	Felix English; Mark Downey	Ireland	−20	18	–2	12
12	Ivo Oliveira; Rui Oliveira	Portugal	−20	8	–12	6
13	Roman Gladysh; Vitaliy Hryniv	Ukraine	−20	3	–17	8
14	Artur Ershov; Maxim Piskunov	Russia	−20	1	–19	9
	Roy Pieters; Wim Stroetinga	Netherlands				DNF
