= 2017 UEC European Track Championships – Men's omnium =

Men's omnium at the 2017 UEC European Track Championships
- UEC European Champion jersey
- Venue: Velodrom, Berlin
- Date: 20 October
- Competitors: 25 from 25 nations

Medalists
gold medal	Albert Torres	Spain
silver medal	Julius Johansen	Denmark
bronze medal	Benjamin Thomas	France

The Men's omnium was held on 20 October 2017. 25 riders were entered, of which 20 qualified and went on to compete across four events.

== Results ==
=== Qualifying ===
The top 10 riders in each heat qualified for the final.

Heat 1

Rank	Name	Nation	Sprint points	Lap points	Finish order	Total points	Notes
1	Raman Tsishkou	Belarus	12	0	1	12	Q
2	Mamyr Stash	Russia	12	0	2	12	Q
3	Szymon Sajnok	Poland	10	0	11	10	Q
4	Christopher Latham	Great Britain	7	0	8	7	Q
5	Gaël Suter	Switzerland	7	0	12	7	Q
6	Anders Oddli	Norway	6	0	3	6	Q
7	Denis Rugovac	Czech Republic	6	0	9	6	Q
8	Albert Torres	Spain	6	0	10	6	Q
9	Lucas Liss	Germany	5	0	6	5	Q
10	Andreas Graf	Austria	4	0	5	4	Q
11	Vitālijs Korņilovs	Latvia	2	0	4	2	
12	Edgar Stepanyan	Armenia	0	0	7	0	
	Jacob Wihk	Sweden	0	0	–	DNF	

Heat 2

Rank	Name	Nation	Sprint points	Lap points	Finish order	Total points	Notes
1	Christos Volikakis	Greece	15	0	1	15	Q
2	João Matias	Portugal	12	0	2	12	Q
3	Lindsay De Vylder	Belgium	11	0	3	11	Q
4	Simone Consonni	Italy	7	0	5	7	Q
5	Julius Johansen	Denmark	7	0	7	7	Q
6	Benjamin Thomas	France	7	0	10	7	Q
7	Krisztián Lovassy	Hungary	5	0	9	5	Q
8	Roy Eefting	Netherlands	3	0	6	3	Q
9	Felix English	Ireland	3	0	11	3	Q
10	Volodymyr Fredyuk	Ukraine	2	0	4	2	Q
11	Filip Taragel	Slovakia	0	0	8	0	
	Marius Petrache	Romania	0	0	–	DNF	

=== Scratch race ===
Standings after 1 event.

Rank	Name	Nation	Laps down	Event points
1	Julius Johansen	Denmark		40
2	Christos Volikakis	Greece	–1	38
3	Albert Torres	Spain	–1	36
4	Felix English	Ireland	–1	34
5	Simone Consonni	Italy	–1	32
6	Anders Oddli	Norway	–1	30
7	Lindsay De Vylder	Belgium	–1	28
8	Christopher Latham	Great Britain	–1	26
9	Andreas Graf	Austria	–1	24
10	Szymon Sajnok	Poland	–1	22
11	João Matias	Portugal	–1	20
12	Denis Rugovac	Czech Republic	–1	18
13	Mamyr Stash	Russia	–1	16
14	Benjamin Thomas	France	–1	14
15	Roy Eefting	Netherlands	–1	12
16	Gaël Suter	Switzerland	–1	10
17	Raman Tsishkou	Belarus	–1	8
18	Krisztián Lovassy	Hungary	–1	6
19	Lucas Liss	Germany	–1	4
20	Volodymyr Fredyuk	Ukraine	–1	2

=== Tempo race ===
Standings after 2 events.

Rank	Name	Nation	Points in race	Finish order	Event points	Overall rank	Subtotal
1	Benjamin Thomas	France	25	21	40	6	54
2	Julius Johansen	Denmark	24	12	38	1	78
3	Lindsay De Vylder	Belgium	23	10	36	3	64
4	Albert Torres	Spain	22	19	34	2	70
5	Szymon Sajnok	Poland	6	3	32	5	54
6	Raman Tsishkou	Belarus	5	2	30	13	38
7	Mamyr Stash	Russia	2	7	28	12	44
8	João Matias	Portugal	2	15	26	10	46
9	Andreas Graf	Austria	1	5	24	9	48
10	Krisztián Lovassy	Hungary	1	6	22	16	28
11	Felix English	Ireland	0	8	20	4	54
12	Gaël Suter	Switzerland	0	9	18	15	28
13	Simone Consonni	Italy	0	11	16	8	48
14	Anders Oddli	Norway	0	14	14	11	44
15	Volodymyr Fredyuk	Ukraine	–18	17	12	19	14
16	Christos Volikakis	Greece	–19	4	10	7	48
17	Lucas Liss	Germany	–19	16	8	20	12
18	Christopher Latham	Great Britain	–19	20	6	14	32
19	Roy Eefting	Netherlands	–20	13	4	18	16
20	Denis Rugovac	Czech Republic	–20	18	2	17	20

=== Elimination race ===
Standings after 3 events.

Rank	Name	Nation	Event points	Overall rank	Subtotal
1	Szymon Sajnok	Poland	40	2	94
2	Benjamin Thomas	France	38	3	92
3	Simone Consonni	Italy	36	6	84
4	Felix English	Ireland	34	4	88
5	Julius Johansen	Denmark	32	1	110
6	Christos Volikakis	Greece	30	8	78
7	Krisztián Lovassy	Hungary	28	13	56
8	Raman Tsishkou	Belarus	26	10	64
9	Gaël Suter	Switzerland	24	15	52
10	João Matias	Portugal	22	9	68
11	Lindsay De Vylder	Belgium	20	7	84
12	Anders Oddli	Norway	18	11	62
13	Mamyr Stash	Russia	16	12	60
14	Albert Torres	Spain	14	5	84
15	Lucas Liss	Germany	12	19	24
16	Christopher Latham	Great Britain	10	16	42
17	Roy Eefting	Netherlands	8	18	24
18	Denis Rugovac	Czech Republic	6	17	26
19	Andreas Graf	Austria	4	14	52
20	Volodymyr Fredyuk	Ukraine	2	20	16

=== Points race and final standings ===
Riders' points from the previous 3 events were carried into the points race, in which the final standings were decided.

Overall rank	Name	Nation	Subtotal	Sprint points	Lap points	Finish order	Final standings
1st place, gold medalist(s)	Albert Torres	Spain	84	18	40	1	142
2nd place, silver medalist(s)	Julius Johansen	Denmark	110	10	20	6	140
3rd place, bronze medalist(s)	Benjamin Thomas	France	92	25	20	8	137
4	Szymon Sajnok	Poland	94	18	20	2	132
5	Felix English	Ireland	88	14	0	3	102
6	Simone Consonni	Italy	84	12	0	19	96
7	Lindsay De Vylder	Belgium	84	6	0	7	90
8	Raman Tsishkou	Belarus	64	4	20	4	88
9	Christos Volikakis	Greece	78	0	0	5	78
10	Krisztián Lovassy	Hungary	56	0	20	9	76
11	Gaël Suter	Switzerland	52	3	20	10	75
12	Andreas Graf	Austria	52	1	20	15	73
13	João Matias	Portugal	68	3	0	20	71
14	Anders Oddli	Norway	62	3	0	12	65
15	Mamyr Stash	Russia	60	0	0	16	60
16	Christopher Latham	Great Britain	42	0	0	13	42
17	Roy Eefting	Netherlands	24	4	0	14	28
18	Lucas Liss	Germany	24	0	0	11	24
19	Denis Rugovac	Czech Republic	26	0	–60	17	–34
20	Volodymyr Fredyuk	Ukraine	16	0	–60	18	–44
