= 2018 UEC European Track Championships – Men's omnium =

Men's omnium at the 2018 UEC European Track Championships
- Venue: Sir Chris Hoy Velodrome, Glasgow
- Date: 4 August
- Competitors: 23 from 23 nations
- Winning points: 133

Medalists
gold medal	Ethan Hayter	Great Britain
silver medal	Elia Viviani	Italy
bronze medal	Casper von Folsach	Denmark

The men's omnium competition at the 2018 UEC European Track Championships was held on 4 August 2018.

== Results ==
=== Scratch race ===
The scratch race was started at 14:25.

Rank	Name	Nation	Laps down	Event points
1	Elia Viviani	Italy		40
2	Ethan Hayter	Great Britain		38
3	Benjamin Thomas	France		36
4	Christos Volikakis	Greece		34
5	Szymon Sajnok	Poland		32
6	Casper von Folsach	Denmark		30
7	Raman Tsishkou	Belarus		28
8	Claudio Imhof	Switzerland		26
9	Albert Torres	Spain		24
10	Robbe Ghys	Belgium		22
11	Rui Oliveira	Portugal		20
12	Felix English	Ireland		18
13	Stefan Matzner	Austria		16
14	Mamyr Stash	Russia		14
15	Roman Gladysh	Ukraine		12
16	Maximilian Beyer	Germany		10
17	Nicolas Pietrula	Czech Republic		8
18	Edgar Stepanyan	Armenia		6
19	Roy Pieters	Netherlands		4
20	Krisztián Lovassy	Hungary	–1	2
21	Filip Taragel	Slovakia	–1	1
22	Vitālijs Korņilovs	Latvia	–1	–39
23	Lars Pria	Romania	–2	–39

=== Tempo race ===
The tempo race was started at 16:26.

Rank	Name	Nation	Points in race	Event points
1	Rui Oliveira	Portugal	28	40
2	Claudio Imhof	Switzerland	27	38
3	Christos Volikakis	Greece	24	36
4	Szymon Sajnok	Poland	23	34
5	Raman Tsishkou	Belarus	23	32
6	Casper von Folsach	Denmark	22	30
7	Benjamin Thomas	France	22	28
8	Felix English	Ireland	4	26
9	Ethan Hayter	Great Britain	2	24
10	Roman Gladysh	Ukraine	1	22
11	Robbe Ghys	Belgium	0	20
12	Elia Viviani	Italy	0	18
13	Albert Torres	Spain	0	16
14	Nicolas Pietrula	Czech Republic	0	14
15	Krisztián Lovassy	Hungary	0	12
16	Mamyr Stash	Russia	0	10
17	Edgar Stepanyan	Armenia	0	8
18	Stefan Matzner	Austria	0	6
19	Maximilian Beyer	Germany	0	4
20	Roy Pieters	Netherlands	0	2
21	Filip Taragel	Slovakia	–20	1
22	Vitālijs Korņilovs	Latvia	–40	1
	Lars Pria	Romania	Did not start	

=== Elimination race ===
The elimination race was started at 19:13.

Rank	Name	Nation	Event points
1	Elia Viviani	Italy	40
2	Benjamin Thomas	France	38
3	Szymon Sajnok	Poland	36
4	Claudio Imhof	Switzerland	34
5	Ethan Hayter	Great Britain	32
6	Robbe Ghys	Belgium	30
7	Rui Oliveira	Portugal	28
8	Casper von Folsach	Denmark	26
9	Felix English	Ireland	24
10	Raman Tsishkou	Belarus	22
11	Albert Torres	Spain	20
12	Christos Volikakis	Greece	18
13	Mamyr Stash	Russia	16
14	Stefan Matzner	Austria	14
15	Roman Gladysh	Ukraine	12
16	Maximilian Beyer	Germany	10
17	Roy Pieters	Netherlands	8
18	Krisztián Lovassy	Hungary	6
19	Nicolas Pietrula	Czech Republic	4
20	Edgar Stepanyan	Armenia	2
21	Vitālijs Korņilovs	Latvia	1
22	Filip Taragel	Slovakia	1

=== Points race ===
The points race was started at 20:01.

Rank	Name	Nation	Lap points	Sprint points	Total points	Finish order
1	Albert Torres	Spain	20	22	42	1
2	Ethan Hayter	Great Britain	20	19	39	12
3	Robbe Ghys	Belgium	20	11	31	3
4	Casper von Folsach	Denmark	20	7	27	17
5	Felix English	Ireland	20		20	8
6	Elia Viviani	Italy		15	15	5
7	Szymon Sajnok	Poland		10	10	7
8	Christos Volikakis	Greece		9	9	2
9	Benjamin Thomas	France		8	8	4
10	Claudio Imhof	Switzerland			0	6
11	Krisztián Lovassy	Hungary			0	11
12	Stefan Matzner	Austria			0	13
13	Mamyr Stash	Russia			0	14
14	Roman Gladysh	Ukraine			0	15
15	Roy Pieters	Netherlands			0	20
16	Raman Tsishkou	Belarus	–20	8	–12	10
17	Nicolas Pietrula	Czech Republic	–20	5	–15	18
18	Edgar Stepanyan	Armenia	–20	1	–19	9
19	Maximilian Beyer	Germany	–20		–20	16
20	Rui Oliveira	Portugal	–20		–20	21
21	Filip Taragel	Slovakia	–40		–40	19
	Vitālijs Korņilovs	Latvia				DNF

=== Final standings ===
The final ranking is given by the sum of the points obtained in the 4 specialties.

Overall Rank	Name	Nation	Scratch Race	Tempo Race	Elim. Race	Points Race	Total Points
1st place, gold medalist(s)	Ethan Hayter	Great Britain	38	24	32	39	133
2nd place, silver medalist(s)	Elia Viviani	Italy	40	18	40	15	113
3rd place, bronze medalist(s)	Casper von Folsach	Denmark	30	30	26	27	113
4	Szymon Sajnok	Poland	32	34	36	10	112
5	Benjamin Thomas	France	36	28	38	8	110
6	Robbe Ghys	Belgium	22	20	30	31	103
7	Albert Torres	Spain	24	16	20	42	102
8	Claudio Imhof	Switzerland	26	38	34	0	98
9	Christos Volikakis	Greece	34	36	18	9	97
10	Felix English	Ireland	18	26	24	26	94
11	Raman Tsishkou	Belarus	28	32	22	–12	70
12	Rui Oliveira	Portugal	20	40	28	–20	68
13	Roman Gladysh	Ukraine	12	22	12	0	46
14	Mamyr Stash	Russia	14	10	16	0	40
15	Stefan Matzner	Austria	16	6	14	0	36
16	Krisztián Lovassy	Hungary	2	12	6	0	20
17	Roy Pieters	Netherlands	4	2	8	0	14
18	Nicolas Pietrula	Czech Republic	8	14	4	–15	11
19	Maximilian Beyer	Germany	10	4	10	–20	4
20	Edgar Stepanyan	Armenia	6	8	2	–19	–3
21	Filip Taragel	Slovakia	1	1	1	–40	–37
22	Vitālijs Korņilovs	Latvia	–39	1	1	0	–37
	Lars Pria	Romania	–39	Did not finish			
