= 2019 UEC European Track Championships – Men's omnium =

Men's omnium at the 2019 UEC European Track Championships
- Venue: Omnisport Apeldoorn, Apeldoorn
- Date: 18 October
- Competitors: 21 from 21 nations
- Winning points: 173

Medalists
gold medal	Benjamin Thomas	France
silver medal	Lasse Norman Hansen	Denmark
bronze medal	Oliver Wood	Great Britain

The men's omnium competition at the 2019 UEC European Track Championships was held on 18 October 2019.

== Results ==
=== Scratch race ===
Rank	Name	Nation	Laps down	Event points
1	Jan-Willem van Schip	Netherlands		40
2	Benjamin Thomas	France		38
3	Albert Torres	Spain		36
4	Lasse Norman Hansen	Denmark		34
5	Oliver Wood	Great Britain		32
6	Lindsay De Vylder	Belgium	–1	30
7	Szymon Sajnok	Poland	–1	28
8	Raman Tsishkou	Belarus	–1	26
9	Elia Viviani	Italy	–1	24
10	Felix English	Ireland	–1	22
11	Rui Oliveira	Portugal	–1	20
12	Maximilian Beyer	Germany	–1	18
13	Claudio Imhof	Switzerland	–1	16
14	Christos Volikakis	Greece	–1	14
15	Valentin Götzinger	Austria	–1	12
16	Krisztián Lovassy	Hungary	–1	10
17	Roman Gladysh	Ukraine	–1	8
18	Artur Ershov	Russia	–1	6
19	Nicolas Pietrula	Czech Republic	–1	4
20	Lukáš Kubiš	Slovakia	–2	–40
21	Daniel Crista	Romania	–2	–40

=== Tempo race ===
Rank	Name	Nation	Points in race	Event points
1	Benjamin Thomas	France	32	40
2	Lasse Norman Hansen	Denmark	29	38
3	Christos Volikakis	Greece	3	36
4	Oliver Wood	Great Britain	3	34
5	Jan-Willem van Schip	Netherlands	3	32
6	Elia Viviani	Italy	2	30
7	Szymon Sajnok	Poland	1	28
8	Albert Torres	Spain	1	26
9	Raman Tsishkou	Belarus	1	24
10	Felix English	Ireland	1	22
11	Lindsay De Vylder	Belgium	0	20
12	Claudio Imhof	Switzerland	0	18
13	Artur Ershov	Russia	0	16
14	Rui Oliveira	Portugal	0	14
15	Krisztián Lovassy	Hungary	–20	12
16	Valentin Götzinger	Austria	–20	10
17	Roman Gladysh	Ukraine	–20	8
18	Maximilian Beyer	Germany	–20	6
19	Nicolas Pietrula	Czech Republic	–20	4
20	Daniel Crista	Romania	–40	2
21	Lukáš Kubiš	Slovakia	–40	1

=== Elimination race ===
Rank	Name	Nation	Event points
1	Elia Viviani	Italy	40
2	Benjamin Thomas	France	38
3	Jan-Willem van Schip	Netherlands	36
4	Oliver Wood	Great Britain	34
5	Christos Volikakis	Greece	32
6	Rui Oliveira	Portugal	30
7	Raman Tsishkou	Belarus	28
8	Lasse Norman Hansen	Denmark	26
9	Albert Torres	Spain	24
10	Szymon Sajnok	Poland	22
11	Maximilian Beyer	Germany	20
12	Lindsay De Vylder	Belgium	18
13	Claudio Imhof	Switzerland	16
14	Artur Ershov	Russia	14
15	Valentin Götzinger	Austria	12
16	Felix English	Ireland	10
17	Nicolas Pietrula	Czech Republic	8
18	Roman Gladysh	Ukraine	6
19	Lukáš Kubiš	Slovakia	4
20	Krisztián Lovassy	Hungary	2
21	Daniel Crista	Romania	1

=== Points race and final standings ===
The final ranking is given by the sum of the points obtained in the 4 specialties.

Overall rank	Name	Nation	Scratch race	Tempo race	Elim. race	Subotal	Lap points	Sprint points	Finish order	Total points
1st place, gold medalist(s)	Benjamin Thomas	France	38	40	38	116	40	17	4	173
2nd place, silver medalist(s)	Lasse Norman Hansen	Denmark	34	38	26	98	40	24	1	162
3rd place, bronze medalist(s)	Oliver Wood	Great Britain	32	34	34	100	40	9	2	149
4	Albert Torres	Spain	36	26	24	86	40	19	10	145
5	Jan-Willem van Schip	Netherlands	40	32	36	108	20	16	5	144
6	Elia Viviani	Italy	24	30	40	94	20	9	15	123
7	Christos Volikakis	Greece	14	36	32	82	20	10	6	112
8	Lindsay De Vylder	Belgium	30	20	18	68	20	1	13	89
9	Rui Oliveira	Portugal	20	14	30	64	20	0	16	84
10	Raman Tsishkou	Belarus	26	24	28	78	0	0	8	78
11	Szymon Sajnok	Poland	28	28	22	78	0	0	11	78
12	Claudio Imhof	Switzerland	16	18	16	50	20	4	7	74
13	Felix English	Ireland	22	22	10	54	0	0	12	54
14	Maximilian Beyer	Germany	18	6	20	44	0	2	9	46
15	Artur Ershov	Russia	6	16	14	36	0	0	19	36
16	Valentin Götzinger	Austria	12	10	12	34	0	1	14	35
17	Krisztián Lovassy	Hungary	10	12	2	24	0	9	3	33
18	Roman Gladysh	Ukraine	8	8	6	22	0	0	20	22
19	Nicolas Pietrula	Czech Republic	4	4	8	16	0	0	18	16
20	Daniel Crista	Romania	–40	2	1	–37	–20	0	17	–57
21	Lukáš Kubiš	Slovakia	–40	1	4	–35	–60	0	21	DNF
