= 2017 UEC European Track Championships – Men's madison =

Men's madison at the 2017 UEC European Track Championships
- UEC European Champion jersey
- Venue: Velodrom, Berlin
- Date: 22 October
- Competitors: 36 from 18 nations

Medalists
gold medal	Florian Maitre; Benjamin Thomas	France
silver medal	Niklas Larsen; Casper Pedersen	Denmark
bronze medal	Wojciech Pszczolarski; Daniel Staniszewski	Poland

The Men's madison was held on 22 October 2017. 18 teams participated over a distance of 50 km (200 laps), with sprints every 10 laps awarding 5, 3, 2 or 1 point to the first four (double in the final sprint); 20 points are also awarded/withdrawn for each lap gained/lost respectively.

== Results ==
Rank	Name	Nation	Sprint points	Lap points	Finish order	Total points
1st place, gold medalist(s)	Florian Maitre; Benjamin Thomas	France	43	0	9	43
2nd place, silver medalist(s)	Niklas Larsen; Casper Pedersen	Denmark	22	20	3	42
3rd place, bronze medalist(s)	Wojciech Pszczolarski; Daniel Staniszewski	Poland	20	20	6	40
4	Claudio Imhof; Tristan Marguet	Switzerland	19	20	1	39
5	Sebastián Mora; Albert Torres	Spain	29	0	2	29
6	Kenny De Ketele; Moreno De Pauw	Belgium	28	0	8	28
7	Mark Downey; Felix English	Ireland	18	0	4	18
8	Andreas Graf; Andreas Müller	Austria	9	0	5	9
9	Theo Reinhardt; Kersten Thiele	Germany	9	0	11	9
10	Yoeri Havik; Roy Pieters	Netherlands	8	0	12	8
11	João Matias; Ivo Oliveira	Portugal	7	0	7	7
12	Simone Consonni; Francesco Lamon	Italy	5	0	10	5
13	Christopher Latham; Oliver Wood	Great Britain	3	0	14	3
14	Jiří Hochmann; Jan Kraus	Czech Republic	–40	0	13	–40
	Viktor Manakov; Maxim Piskunov	Russia	4	–40	–	DNF
	Yauheni Akhramenka; Mikhail Shemetau	Belarus	0	–40	–	DNF
	Christos Volikakis; Zafeiris Volikakis	Greece	0	−40	–	DNF
	Roman Gladysh; Taras Shevchuk	Ukraine	7	−60	–	DNF
