= 2016 UEC European Track Championships – Men's omnium =

Men's omnium at the 2016 UEC European Track Championships
- UEC European Champion jersey
- Venue: Vélodrome de Saint-Quentin-en-Yvelines, Yvelines
- Date: 21 October
- Competitors: 21 from 21 nations

Medalists
gold medal	Albert Torres	Spain
silver medal	Gaël Suter	Switzerland
bronze medal	Benjamin Thomas	France

The Men's omnium was held on 21 October 2016; 21 riders competed across four events.

== Results ==
=== Scratch race ===
Standings after 1 event.

Rank	Name	Nation	Laps down	Event points
1	Lucas Liss	Germany		40
2	Benjamin Thomas	France		38
3	Sergey Rostovtsev	Russia		36
4	Adrian Tekliński	Poland		34
5	Casper Pedersen	Denmark		32
6	Yauheni Karaliok	Belarus		30
7	Anders Oddli	Norway		28
8	Mark Stewart	Great Britain		26
9	Gaël Suter	Switzerland		24
10	Simone Consonni	Italy		22
11	Albert Torres	Spain		20
12	Vladyslav Kreminskyi	Ukraine		18
13	Krisztián Lovassy	Hungary		16
14	Roy Eefting	Netherlands		14
15	Moreno De Pauw	Belgium		12
16	Felix English	Ireland		10
17	Andrej Strmiska	Slovakia		8
18	Nicolas Pietrula	Czech Republic		6
19	Rafael Silva	Portugal		4
20	Stefan Matzner	Austria		2
—	Zafeiris Volikakis	Greece	DNF	—

=== Tempo race ===
Standings after 2 events.

Rank	Name	Nation	Points in race	Finish order	Event points	Overall rank	Subtotal
1	Albert Torres	Spain	16	15	40	3	60
2	Simone Consonni	Italy	8	1	38	4	60
3	Gaël Suter	Switzerland	8	16	36	5	60
4	Felix English	Ireland	7	17	34	10	44
5	Casper Pedersen	Denmark	6	8	32	1	64
6	Mark Stewart	Great Britain	6	13	30	6	56
7	Roy Eefting	Netherlands	6	18	28	11	42
8	Benjamin Thomas	France	5	7	26	2	64
9	Krisztián Lovassy	Hungary	5	11	24	12	40
10	Moreno De Pauw	Belgium	4	2	22	15	34
11	Vladyslav Kreminskyi	Ukraine	3	5	20	14	38
12	Adrian Tekliński	Poland	0	3	18	7	52
13	Sergey Rostovtsev	Russia	0	4	16	8	52
14	Stefan Matzner	Austria	0	6	14	17	16
15	Rafael Silva	Portugal	0	9	12	18	16
16	Yauheni Karaliok	Belarus	0	10	10	13	40
17	Lucas Liss	Germany	0	12	8	9	48
18	Nicolas Pietrula	Czech Republic	0	14	6	19	12
19	Anders Oddli	Norway	0	19	4	16	32
20	Andrej Strmiska	Slovakia	DNF^{[A]}	20	2	20	10
—	Zafeiris Volikakis	Greece	DNS	—	—	21	DNF

==== Note ====
- ^{^{A}}Despite being marked DNF, Andrej Strmiska still increased his overall score by 2 as he collected 2 points within the race.

=== Elimination race ===
Standings after 3 events.

Rank	Name	Nation	Event points	Overall rank	Subtotal
1	Simone Consonni	Italy	40	1	100
2	Gaël Suter	Switzerland	38	3	98
3	Benjamin Thomas	France	36	2	100
4	Albert Torres	Spain	34	4	94
5	Felix English	Ireland	32	8	76
6	Casper Pedersen	Denmark	30	5	94
7	Sergey Rostovtsev	Russia	28	6	80
8	Vladyslav Kreminskyi	Ukraine	26	11	64
9	Mark Stewart	Great Britain	24	7	80
10	Adrian Tekliński	Poland	22	9	74
11	Lucas Liss	Germany	20	10	68
12	Moreno De Pauw	Belgium	18	12	52
13	Anders Oddli	Norway	16	14	48
14	Nicolas Pietrula	Czech Republic	14	18	26
15	Rafael Silva	Portugal	12	17	28
16	Yauheni Karaliok	Belarus	10	13	50
17	Krisztián Lovassy	Hungary	8	15	48
18	Andrej Strmiska	Slovakia	6	20	16
19	Stefan Matzner	Austria	4	19	20
20	Roy Eefting	Netherlands	2	16	44
—	Zafeiris Volikakis	Greece	DNS	21	DNF

=== Points race and final standings ===
Riders' points from the previous 3 events were carried into the points race, in which the final standings were decided.

Overall rank	Name	Nation	Subtotal	Sprint points	Lap points	Finish order	Final standings
1st place, gold medalist(s)	Albert Torres	Spain	94	12	20	19	126
2nd place, silver medalist(s)	Gaël Suter	Switzerland	98	5	20	15	123
3rd place, bronze medalist(s)	Benjamin Thomas	France	100	14	0	12	114
4	Simone Consonni	Italy	100	12	0	9	112
5	Casper Pedersen	Denmark	94	12	0	13	106
6	Mark Stewart	Great Britain	80	4	20	18	104
7	Felix English	Ireland	76	16	0	1	92
8	Adrian Tekliński	Poland	74	11	0	3	85
9	Sergey Rostovtsev	Russia	80	3	0	11	83
10	Lucas Liss	Germany	68	0	0	16	68
11	Vladyslav Kreminskyi	Ukraine	64	0	0	6	64
12	Yauheni Karaliok	Belarus	50	11	0	2	61
13	Moreno De Pauw	Belgium	52	8	0	4	60
14	Roy Eefting	Netherlands	44	9	0	10	53
15	Krisztián Lovassy	Hungary	48	3	0	8	51
16	Anders Oddli	Norway	48	1	0	17	49
17	Rafael Silva	Portugal	28	0	0	5	28
18	Nicolas Pietrula	Czech Republic	26	0	0	7	26
19	Stefan Matzner	Austria	20	0	0	20	20
20	Andrej Strmiska	Slovakia	16	0	0	14	16
21	Zafeiris Volikakis	Greece	—	—	—	—	DNF
