= 2021 UCI Track Cycling World Championships – Men's points race =

Men's points race at the 2021 UCI Track Cycling World Championships
- Venue: Vélodrome Couvert Régional Jean Stablinski
- Location: Roubaix, France
- Dates: 22 October
- Competitors: 21 from 21 nations
- Winning points: 94

Medalists
gold medal	Benjamin Thomas	France
silver medal	Kenny De Ketele	Belgium
bronze medal	Vincent Hoppezak	Netherlands

The Men's points race competition at the 2021 UCI Track Cycling World Championships was held on 22 October 2021.

== Results ==
The race was started at 18:32. 160 (40 km) laps were raced with 16 sprints.

Rank	Name	Nation	Lap points	Sprint points	Total points
1st place, gold medalist(s)	Benjamin Thomas	France	40	54	94
2nd place, silver medalist(s)	Kenny De Ketele	Belgium	60	24	84
3rd place, bronze medalist(s)	Vincent Hoppezak	Netherlands	20	15	35
4	Sebastián Mora	Spain	20	4	24
5	Ethan Vernon	Great Britain	0	19	19
6	Valère Thiébaud	Switzerland	0	16	16
7	Corbin Strong	New Zealand	0	14	14
8	Michele Scartezzini	Italy	0	9	9
9	Theo Reinhardt	Germany	0	8	8
10	Vlas Shichkin	Russian Cycling Federation	0	6	6
11	Vitaliy Hryniv	Ukraine	0	3	3
12	Gavin Hoover	United States	−20	8	−12
13	Wojciech Pszczolarski	Poland	−20	2	−18
14	Daniel Crista	Romania	−20	0	−20
15	Facundo Lezica	Argentina	−40	0	−40
16	Martin Chren	Slovakia	−40	0	−40
17	Nicolas Pietrula	Czech Republic	−40	0	−40
18	José Muñiz	Mexico	−100	0	−100
–	Dzianis Mazur	Belarus	Did not finish		
–	Lotfi Tchambaz	Algeria	Did not finish		
–	Bryan Gómez	Colombia	Did not finish		
