= 2021 UEC European Track Championships – Men's points race =

Men's points race at the 2021 UEC European Track Championships
- Venue: Tissot Velodrome, Grenchen
- Date: 6 October
- Competitors: 25 from 25 nations
- Winning points: 81

Medalists
gold medal	Benjamin Thomas	France
silver medal	Iúri Leitão	Portugal
bronze medal	Vlas Shichkin	Russia

The men's points race competition at the 2021 UEC European Track Championships was held on 6 October 2021.

== Results ==
=== Qualifying ===
The top 10 riders in each heat qualified for the final.

Heat 1

Rank	Name	Nation	Lap points	Sprint points	Finish order	Total points	Notes
1	Kenny De Ketele	Belgium	20	17	9	37	Q
2	William Perrett	Great Britain	20	14	4	34	Q
3	Nicolas Pietrula	Czech Republic	0	16	1	16	Q
4	Pierre-Pascal Keup	Germany	0	13	2	13	Q
5	Jan-Willem van Schip	Netherlands	0	13	5	13	Q
6	Matteo Donega	Italy	0	9	8	9	Q
7	Iúri Leitão	Portugal	0	7	6	7	Q
8	Rotem Tene	Israel	0	4	3	4	Q
9	Andreas Graf	Austria	0	4	10	4	Q
10	Dimitrios Christakos	Greece	0	2	7	2	Q
11	Nikolay Genov	Bulgaria	0	0	–	DNF	
11	Vitālijs Korņilovs	Latvia	–20	0	–	DNF	
11	Martin Chren	Slovakia	–20	0	–	DNF	

Heat 2

Rank	Name	Nation	Lap points	Sprint points	Finish order	Total points	Notes
1	Nicolò De Lisi	Switzerland	0	19	2	19	Q
2	Daniel Crista	Romania	0	16	8	16	Q
3	Vlas Shichkin	Russia	0	9	3	9	Q
4	Yauheni Karaliok	Belarus	0	9	4	9	Q
5	Daniel Staniszewski	Poland	0	7	10	7	Q
6	Benjamin Thomas	France	0	6	6	6	Q
7	Sebastián Mora	Spain	0	5	5	5	Q
8	Vitaliy Hryniv	Ukraine	0	5	9	5	Q
9	JB Murphy	Ireland	0	4	11	4	Q
10	Krisztián Lovassy	Hungary	0	3	7	3	Q
11	Mantas Bitinas	Lithuania	–20	16	1	–4	
12	Carl-Frederik Bévort	Denmark	0	0	–	DNF	

=== Final ===
160 laps (40 km) were raced with 16 sprints.

Rank	Name	Nation	Lap points	Sprint points	Finish order	Total points
1st place, gold medalist(s)	Benjamin Thomas	France	40	41	7	81
2nd place, silver medalist(s)	Iúri Leitão	Portugal	40	21	6	61
3rd place, bronze medalist(s)	Vlas Shichkin	Russia	40	17	3	57
4	Daniel Staniszewski	Poland	20	23	1	43
5	JB Murphy	Ireland	40	3	5	43
6	Sebastián Mora	Spain	20	23	8	43
7	Kenny De Ketele	Belgium	20	19	2	39
8	William Perrett	Great Britain	20	12	4	32
9	Jan-Willem van Schip	Netherlands	20	9	13	29
10	Yauheni Karaliok	Belarus	20	6	11	26
11	Vitaliy Hryniv	Ukraine	0	3	10	3
12	Matteo Donega	Italy	–20	0	12	–20
13	Nicolas Pietrula	Czech Republic	–60	2	9	–58
14	Andreas Graf	Austria	–40	0	–	DNF
14	Dimitrios Christakos	Greece	–40	0	–	DNF
14	Krisztián Lovassy	Hungary	–40	2	–	DNF
14	Rotem Tene	Israel	–20	0	–	DNF
14	Daniel Crista	Romania	0	3	–	DNF
14	Nicolò De Lisi	Switzerland	–20	2	–	DNF
14	Pierre-Pascal Keup	Germany	0	1	–	DNF
