= 2016 UEC European Track Championships – Men's Madison =

European track championships

Men's Madison at the 2016 UEC European Track Championships
- UEC European Champion jersey
- Venue: Vélodrome de Saint-Quentin-en-Yvelines, Yvelines
- Date: 23 October
- Competitors: 34 from 17 nations

Medalists
gold medal	Sebastián Mora; Albert Torres	Spain
silver medal	Morgan Kneisky; Benjamin Thomas	France
bronze medal	Kenny De Ketele; Moreno De Pauw	Belgium

The Men's Madison was held on 23 October 2016. 17 teams participated over a distance of 50 km (200 laps), with sprints every 10 laps awarding 5, 3, 2 or 1 point to the first four (double in the final sprint); 20 points are also awarded/withdrawn for each lap gained/lost respectively.

== Results ==
Rank	Name	Nation	Sprint points	Lap points	Finish order	Total points
1st place, gold medalist(s)	Sebastián Mora; Albert Torres	Spain	11	40	5	51
2nd place, silver medalist(s)	Morgan Kneisky; Benjamin Thomas	France	45	0	6	45
3rd place, bronze medalist(s)	Kenny De Ketele; Moreno De Pauw	Belgium	44	0	2	44
4	Andreas Graf; Andreas Müller	Austria	17	20	4	37
5	Simone Consonni; Francesco Lamon	Italy	20	0	1	20
6	Frederik Rodenberg Madsen; Casper von Folsach	Denmark	19	0	3	19
7	Wojciech Pszczolarski; Daniel Staniszewski	Poland	19	0	8	19
8	Tristan Marguet; Loïc Perizzolo	Switzerland	6	0	7	6
9	Roy Pieters; Wim Stroetinga	Netherlands	5	0	14	5
10	Martin Bláha; Vojtěch Hačecký	Czech Republic	4	0	12	4
11	Felix English; Fintan Ryan	Ireland	8	−20	9	−12
12	Leif Lampater; Sebastian Wotschke	Germany	8	−20	15	−12
13	Joao Matias; Ivo Oliveira	Portugal	5	−20	10	−15
14	Maxim Piskunov; Sergey Rostovtsev	Russia	9	−40	11	−31
15	Mark Stewart; Oliver Wood	Great Britain	2	−40	13	−38
16	Vitaliy Hryniv; Taras Shevchuk	Ukraine	9	−60	16	−51
–	Yauheni Akhramenka; Anton Muzychkin	Belarus	0	−20	–	DNF
