= 2023 UEC European Track Championships – Men's omnium =

Men's omnium at the 2023 UEC European Track Championships
- Venue: Tissot Velodrome, Grenchen
- Date: 11 February
- Competitors: 23 from 23 nations
- Winning points: 162

Medalists
gold medal	Benjamin Thomas	France
silver medal	Simone Consonni	Italy
bronze medal	William Perrett	Great Britain

The men's omnium competition at the 2023 UEC European Track Championships was held on 11 February 2023.

== Results ==
=== Scratch race ===
Rank	Name	Nation	Laps down	Event points
1	Jan Willem van Schip	Netherlands		40
2	Sebastián Mora	Spain		38
3	Rotem Tene	Israel		36
4	João Matias	Portugal		34
5	Simone Consonni	Italy		32
6	Bertold Drijver	Hungary		30
7	Valère Thiébaud	Switzerland		28
8	Lindsay De Vylder	Belgium		26
9	Roger Kluge	Germany		24
10	William Perrett	Great Britain		22
11	Benjamin Thomas	France		20
12	Christos Volikakis	Greece		18
13	Tim Wafler	Austria		16
14	Szymon Sajnok	Poland		14
15	Aivaras Mikutis	Lithuania		12
16	Jack Bernard Murphy	Ireland		10
17	Daniel Crista	Romania		8
18	Jan Voneš	Czech Republic		6
19	Niklas Larsen	Denmark		4
20	Kyrylo Tsarenko	Ukraine		2
21	Gustav Johansson	Sweden	–1	1
22	Martin Chren	Slovakia	DNF	–39
23	George Nemilostivijs	Latvia	DNF	–39

=== Tempo race ===
Rank	Name	Nation	Points in race	Event points
1	Jack Bernard Murphy	Ireland	32	40
2	Benjamin Thomas	France	26	38
3	Valère Thiébaud	Switzerland	24	36
4	William Perrett	Great Britain	22	34
5	Sebastián Mora	Spain	22	32
6	Jan Willem van Schip	Netherlands	21	30
7	Simone Consonni	Italy	21	28
8	Jan Voneš	Czech Republic	21	26
9	João Matias	Portugal	2	24
10	Niklas Larsen	Denmark	1	22
11	Lindsay De Vylder	Belgium	1	20
12	Roger Kluge	Germany	1	18
13	Tim Wafler	Austria	1	16
14	Christos Volikakis	Greece	0	14
15	Daniel Crista	Romania	0	12
16	Aivaras Mikutis	Lithuania	0	10
17	Bertold Drijver	Hungary	0	8
18	Rotem Tene	Israel	0	6
19	Gustav Johansson	Sweden	0	4
20	Szymon Sajnok	Poland	0	2
21	Kyrylo Tsarenko	Ukraine	0	1
22	Martin Chren	Slovakia	0	1
23	George Nemilostivijs	Latvia	–20	1

=== Elimination race ===
Rank	Name	Nation	Event points
1	Benjamin Thomas	France	40
2	Simone Consonni	Italy	38
3	Roger Kluge	Germany	36
4	Niklas Larsen	Denmark	34
5	Jan Willem van Schip	Netherlands	32
6	Sebastián Mora	Spain	30
7	Lindsay De Vylder	Belgium	28
8	William Perrett	Great Britain	26
9	Szymon Sajnok	Poland	24
10	Tim Wafler	Austria	22
11	Jan Voneš	Czech Republic	20
12	Gustav Johansson	Sweden	18
13	Rotem Tene	Israel	16
14	Valère Thiébaud	Switzerland	14
15	Christos Volikakis	Greece	12
16	Aivaras Mikutis	Lithuania	10
17	João Matias	Portugal	8
18	Daniel Crista	Romania	6
19	Bertold Drijver	Hungary	4
20	Jack Bernard Murphy	Ireland	2
21	George Nemilostivijs	Latvia	1
22	Kyrylo Tsarenko	Ukraine	1
23	Martin Chren	Slovakia	1

=== Points race ===
Overall rank	Name	Nation	Scratch race	Tempo race	Elim. race	Subtotal	Lap points	Sprint points	Finish order	Total points
1st place, gold medalist(s)	Benjamin Thomas	France	20	38	40	98	40	24	21	162
2nd place, silver medalist(s)	Simone Consonni	Italy	32	28	38	98	40	8	11	146
3rd place, bronze medalist(s)	William Perrett	Great Britain	22	34	26	82	40	14	10	136
4	Roger Kluge	Germany	24	18	36	78	40	16	2	136
5	Sebastian Mora	Spain	38	32	30	100	20	9	22	129
6	Jan Willem van Schip	Netherlands	40	30	32	102	0	4	16	106
7	Lindsay De Vylder	Belgium	26	20	28	74	20	8	3	102
8	Niklas Larsen	Denmark	4	22	34	60	20	10	1	90
9	João Matias	Portugal	34	24	8	66	20	3	12	89
10	Valère Thiébaud	Switzerland	28	36	14	78	0	2	17	80
11	Szymon Sajnok	Poland	14	2	24	40	20	5	4	65
12	Tim Wafler	Austria	16	16	22	54	0	7	5	61
13	Rotem Tene	Israel	36	6	16	58	0	1	14	59
14	Jack Bernard Murphy	Ireland	10	40	2	52	0	2	18	54
15	Jan Voneš	Czech Republic	6	26	20	52	0	0	6	52
16	Daniel Crista	Romania	8	12	6	26	20	0	15	46
17	Christos Volikakis	Greece	18	14	12	44	0	0	7	44
18	Bertold Drijver	Hungary	30	8	4	42	0	0	9	42
19	Aivaras Mikutis	Lithuania	12	10	10	32	0	5	8	37
20	Gustav Johansson	Sweden	1	4	18	23	0	0	19	23
21	Kyrylo Tsarenko	Ukraine	2	1	1	4	0	2	13	6
22	Martin Chren	Slovakia	–39	1	1	–37	0	1	20	–36
23	George Nemilostivijs	Latvia	–39	1	1	–37	–20	0	DNF	
