= 2017 UCI Track Cycling World Championships – Men's omnium =

Men's omnium at the 2017 UCI Track Cycling World Championships
- Venue: Hong Kong Velodrome
- Location: Hong Kong
- Dates: 15 April
- Competitors: 21 from 21 nations
- Winning points: 149

Medalists
gold medal	Benjamin Thomas	France
silver medal	Aaron Gate	New Zealand
bronze medal	Albert Torres	Spain

The Men's omnium competition at the 2017 World Championships will be held on 15 April 2017.

== Results ==
=== Scratch race ===
40 laps (10 km) were raced.

Rank	Name	Nation	Laps down	Event points
1	Albert Torres	Spain		40
2	Benjamin Thomas	France		38
3	Simone Consonni	Italy		36
4	Maximilian Beyer	Germany		34
5	Szymon Sajnok	Poland		32
6	Aaron Gate	New Zealand		30
7	Roy Eefting	Netherlands		28
8	Sultanmurat Miraliyev	Kazakhstan	−1	26
9	Ivo Oliveira	Portugal	−1	24
10	Sam Welsford	Australia	−1	22
11	Casper Pedersen	Denmark	−1	20
12	Lindsay De Vylder	Belgium	−1	18
13	Shunsuke Imamura	Japan	−1	16
14	Park Sang-hoon	South Korea	−1	14
15	Raman Tsishkou	Belarus	−1	12
16	Roman Gladysh	Ukraine	−1	10
17	Gaël Suter	Switzerland	−1	8
18	Leung Chun Wing	Hong Kong	−1	6
19	Viktor Manakov	Russia	−1	4
20	Christopher Latham	Great Britain	−1	2
21	Edibaldo Maldonado	Mexico	−1	1

=== Tempo race ===
36 sprints were held, each awarding a point to the winner; in addition, 20 points were added/subtracted for a lap gain/loss respectively.

Rank	Name	Nation	Points in race	Finish order	Event points	Overall rank	Subtotal
1	Aaron Gate	New Zealand	43	19	40	2	70
2	Albert Torres	Spain	40	11	38	1	78
3	Szymon Sajnok	Poland	25	2	36	4	68
4	Casper Pedersen	Denmark	25	18	34	8	54
5	Roy Eefting	Netherlands	24	21	32	6	60
6	Benjamin Thomas	France	23	20	30	3	68
7	Maximilian Beyer	Germany	22	1	28	5	62
8	Gaël Suter	Switzerland	22	4	26	13	34
9	Sam Welsford	Australia	22	12	24	9	46
10	Lindsay De Vylder	Belgium	21	3	22	11	40
11	Viktor Manakov	Russia	21	5	20	15	24
12	Simone Consonni	Italy	21	10	18	7	54
13	Ivo Oliveira	Portugal	21	15	16	10	40
14	Leung Chun Wing	Hong Kong	21	16	14	17	20
15	Park Sang-hoon	South Korea	3	17	12	14	26
16	Sultanmurat Miraliyev	Kazakhstan	2	6	10	12	36
17	Raman Tsishkou	Belarus	0	7	8	16	20
18	Edibaldo Maldonado	Mexico	0	8	6	20	7
19	Roman Gladysh	Ukraine	0	9	4	19	14
20	Christopher Latham	Great Britain	0	13	2	21	4
21	Shunsuke Imamura	Japan	0	14	1	18	17

=== Elimination race ===
Sprints were held every two laps; the last rider in each sprint was eliminated.

Rank	Name	Nation	Event points	Overall rank	Subtotal
1	Sam Welsford	Australia	40	7	86
2	Simone Consonni	Italy	38	4	92
3	Benjamin Thomas	France	36	2	104
4	Albert Torres	Spain	34	1	112
5	Maximilian Beyer	Germany	32	3	94
6	Roy Eefting	Netherlands	30	6	90
7	Raman Tsishkou	Belarus	28	13	48
8	Gaël Suter	Switzerland	26	10	60
9	Shunsuke Imamura	Japan	24	15	41
10	Aaron Gate	New Zealand	22	5	92
11	Sultanmurat Miraliyev	Kazakhstan	20	12	56
12	Lindsay De Vylder	Belgium	18	11	58
13	Christopher Latham	Great Britain	16	20	20
14	Roman Gladysh	Ukraine	14	17	28
15	Szymon Sajnok	Poland	12	8	80
16	Edibaldo Maldonado	Mexico	10	21	17
17	Casper Pedersen	Denmark	8	9	62
18	Park Sang-hoon	South Korea	6	16	32
19	Leung Chun Wing	Hong Kong	4	19	24
20	Ivo Oliveira	Portugal	2	14	42
21	Viktor Manakov	Russia	1	18	25

=== Points race and final standings ===
Riders' points from the previous 3 events were carried into the points race (consisting of 100 laps (25km)), in which the final standings were decided.

Overall rank	Name	Nation	Subtotal	Sprint points	Lap points	Finish order	Final standings
1st place, gold medalist(s)	Benjamin Thomas	France	104	25	20	3	149
2nd place, silver medalist(s)	Aaron Gate	New Zealand	92	15	40	4	147
3rd place, bronze medalist(s)	Albert Torres	Spain	112	6	20	8	138
4	Simone Consonni	Italy	92	9	20	12	121
5	Roy Eefting	Netherlands	90	9	20	21	119
6	Casper Pedersen	Denmark	62	17	20	2	99
7	Sam Welsford	Australia	86	8	0	11	94
8	Szymon Sajnok	Poland	80	5	0	10	85
9	Maximilian Beyer	Germany	94	4	−20	19	78
10	Ivo Oliveira	Portugal	42	15	20	1	77
11	Gaël Suter	Switzerland	60	0	0	16	60
12	Lindsay De Vylder	Belgium	58	0	0	6	58
13	Sultanmurat Miraliyev	Kazakhstan	56	0	−20	5	36
14	Park Sang-hoon	South Korea	32	0	0	14	32
15	Raman Tsishkou	Belarus	48	0	−20	13	28
16	Viktor Manakov	Russia	25	2	0	17	27
17	Leung Chun Wing	Hong Kong	24	1	0	15	25
18	Christopher Latham	Great Britain	20	2	0	7	22
19	Shunsuke Imamura	Japan	41	0	−20	18	21
20	Roman Gladysh	Ukraine	28	0	−20	20	8
21	Edibaldo Maldonado	Mexico	17	0	−20	9	0
