= 2023 UEC European Track Championships – Men's points race =

Men's points race at the 2023 UEC European Track Championships
- Venue: Tissot Velodrome, Munich
- Date: 9 February
- Competitors: 22 from 22 nations
- Winning points: 54

Medalists
gold medal	Simone Consonni	Italy
silver medal	Albert Torres	Spain
bronze medal	Donavan Grondin	France

The men's points race competition at the 2023 UEC European Track Championships was held on 9 February 2023.

== Results ==
160 laps (40 km) were raced with 16 sprints.

Rank	Name	Nation	Lap points	Sprint points	Finish order	Total points
1st place, gold medalist(s)	Simone Consonni	Italy	20	34	2	54
2nd place, silver medalist(s)	Albert Torres	Spain	20	31	1	51
3rd place, bronze medalist(s)	Donavan Grondin	France	20	28	5	48
4	Robbe Ghys	Belgium	20	19	3	39
5	Tobias Hansen	Denmark	20	17	10	37
6	Diogo Narciso	Portugal	20	16	4	36
7	William Perrett	Great Britain	20	11	6	31
8	Bertold Drijver	Hungary	20	4	8	24
9	Yoeri Havik	Netherlands	0	8	14	8
10	Tim Torn Teutenberg	Germany	0	3	16	3
11	Wojciech Pszczolarski	Poland	0	2	13	2
12	Gustav Johansson	Sweden	0	0	12	0
13	Lukas Rüegg	Switzerland	–20	3	7	–17
14	Alon Yogev	Israel	–20	3	9	–17
15	Daniel Crista	Romania	–20	0	15	–20
16	Maximilian Schmidbauer	Austria	–40	4	11	–36
17	Adam Křenek	Czech Republic	–60	0	17	–60
18	Mykyta Yakovlev	Ukraine	–40	4	–	DNF
19	Martin Chren	Slovakia	–40	0	–	DNF
20	Musa Mikayilzade	Azerbaijan	–60	0	–	DNF
21	Rokas Adomaitis	Lithuania	–20	0	–	DNF
22	Vitālijs Korņilovs	Latvia	–60	0	–	DNF
