= 2025 UCI Track Cycling World Championships – Men's omnium =

Men's omnium at the 2025 UCI Track Cycling World Championships
- Venue: Velódromo Peñalolén
- Location: Santiago, Chile
- Dates: 26 October
- Competitors: 24 from 24 nations
- Winning points: 133

Medalists
gold medal	Albert Torres	Spain
silver medal	Kazushige Kuboki	Japan
bronze medal	Lindsay De Vylder	Belgium

The Men's omnium competition at the 2025 UCI Track Cycling World Championships was held on 25 October 2025.

== Results ==
=== Scratch race ===
The scratch race was started at 12:22.

Rank	Name	Nation	Laps down	Event points
1	Kazushige Kuboki	Japan		40
2	Lindsay De Vylder	Belgium		38
3	Juan David Sierra	Italy		36
4	Albert Torres	Spain		34
5	Ashlin Barry	United States		32
6	Niklas Larsen	Denmark		30
7	Campbell Stewart	New Zealand		28
8	Philip Heijnen	Netherlands		26
9	Oscar Nilsson-Julien	France		24
10	Moritz Augenstein	Germany		22
11	Adam Křenek	Czech Republic		20
12	Matthew Bostock	Great Britain		18
13	Oliver Bleddyn	Australia		16
14	Dylan Bibic	Canada		14
15	Iúri Leitão	Portugal		12
16	Raphael Kokas	Austria		10
17	Ricardo Peña	Mexico		8
18	Bertold Drijver	Hungary		6
19	Clever Martínez	Venezuela		4
20	Alex Vogel	Switzerland		2
21	Filip Prokopyszyn	Poland	–1	1
22	Jacob Decar	Chile	–1	1
23	Martin Chren	Slovakia	–1	1
24	Akil Campbell	Trinidad and Tobago	–2	1

=== Tempo race ===
The tempo race was started at 15:06.

Rank	Name	Nation	Lap points	Sprint points	Total points	Event points
1	Moritz Augenstein	Germany	20	3	23	40
2	Kazushige Kuboki	Japan	0	7	7	38
3	Albert Torres	Spain	0	6	6	36
4	Oliver Bleddyn	Australia	0	5	5	34
5	Filip Prokopyszyn	Poland	0	4	4	32
6	Adam Křenek	Czech Republic	0	2	2	30
7	Philip Heijnen	Netherlands	0	1	1	28
8	Iúri Leitão	Portugal	0	1	1	26
9	Raphael Kokas	Austria	0	1	1	24
10	Matthew Bostock	Great Britain	0	0	0	22
11	Lindsay De Vylder	Belgium	0	0	0	20
12	Bertold Drijver	Hungary	0	0	0	18
13	Niklas Larsen	Denmark	0	0	0	16
14	Alex Vogel	Switzerland	0	0	0	14
15	Oscar Nilsson-Julien	France	0	0	0	12
16	Juan David Sierra	Italy	0	0	0	10
17	Ashlin Barry	United States	−20	3	−17	8
18	Campbell Stewart	New Zealand	−20	2	−18	6
19	Ricardo Peña	Mexico	−20	1	−19	4
20	Jacob Decar	Chile	−20	0	−20	2
21	Dylan Bibic	Canada	−20	0	−20	1
22	Clever Martínez	Venezuela	−20	0	−20	1
23	Martin Chren	Slovakia	−20	0	−20	1
24	Akil Campbell	Trinidad and Tobago	−40	0	−40	1

=== Elimination race ===
The elimination race was started at 18:56.

Rank	Name	Nation	Event points
1	Lindsay De Vylder	Belgium	40
2	Moritz Augenstein	Germany	38
3	Albert Torres	Spain	36
4	Iúri Leitão	Portugal	34
5	Philip Heijnen	Netherlands	32
6	Matthew Bostock	Great Britain	30
7	Niklas Larsen	Denmark	28
8	Oliver Bleddyn	Australia	26
9	Kazushige Kuboki	Japan	24
10	Adam Křenek	Czech Republic	22
11	Juan David Sierra	Italy	20
12	Oscar Nilsson-Julien	France	18
13	Filip Prokopyszyn	Poland	16
14	Alex Vogel	Switzerland	14
15	Campbell Stewart	New Zealand	12
16	Clever Martínez	Venezuela	10
17	Akil Campbell	Trinidad and Tobago	8
18	Ashlin Barry	United States	6
19	Raphael Kokas	Austria	4
20	Bertold Drijver	Hungary	2
21	Ricardo Peña	Mexico	1
22	Jacob Decar	Chile	1
23	Dylan Bibic	Canada	1
24	Martin Chren	Slovakia	1

=== Points race and overall standings ===
The points race was started at 20:18.

Rank	Name	Nation	Lap points	Sprint points	Total points
1st place, gold medalist(s)	Albert Torres	Spain	20	7	133
2nd place, silver medalist(s)	Kazushige Kuboki	Japan	20	9	131
3rd place, bronze medalist(s)	Lindsay De Vylder	Belgium	20	13	131
4	Niklas Larsen	Denmark	40	16	130
5	Moritz Augenstein	Germany	20	7	127
6	Oscar Nilsson-Julien	France	60	7	121
7	Matthew Bostock	Great Britain	40	6	116
8	Philip Heijnen	Netherlands	20	8	114
9	Iúri Leitão	Portugal	20	12	104
10	Oliver Bleddyn	Australia	0	17	93
11	Adam Křenek	Czech Republic	20	0	92
12	Juan David Sierra	Italy	20	3	89
13	Filip Prokopyszyn	Poland	20	0	69
14	Campbell Stewart	New Zealand	20	0	66
15	Raphael Kokas	Austria	20	3	61
16	Ashlin Barry	United States	0	0	46
17	Bertold Drijver	Hungary	0	1	27
18	Dylan Bibic	Canada	0	2	18
19	Ricardo Peña	Mexico	0	5	18
20	Clever Martínez	Venezuela	20	0	15
21	Alex Vogel	Switzerland	−20	3	13
22	Jacob Decar	Chile	0	2	6
23	Martin Chren	Slovakia	−20	0	−17
—	Akil Campbell	Trinidad and Tobago	Did not finish		
