= 2016 UEC European Track Championships – Men's elimination race =

Men's elimination race at the 2016 UEC European Track Championships
- UEC European Champion jersey
- Venue: Vélodrome de Saint-Quentin-en-Yvelines, Yvelines
- Date: 20 October
- Competitors: 18 from 18 nations

Medalists
gold medal	Loïc Perizzolo	Switzerland
silver medal	Christos Volikakis	Greece
bronze medal	Jiří Hochmann	Czech Republic

The Men's elimination race was held on 20 October 2016.

== Results ==
Rank	Name	Nation
1st place, gold medalist(s)	Loïc Perizzolo	Switzerland
2nd place, silver medalist(s)	Christos Volikakis	Greece
3rd place, bronze medalist(s)	Jiří Hochmann	Czech Republic
4	Morgan Kneisky	France
5	Joao Matias	Portugal
6	Raman Tsishkou	Belarus
7	Maxim Piskunov	Russia
8	Fintan Ryan	Ireland
9	Sebastian Wotschke	Germany
10	Kian Emadi	Great Britain
11	Szymon Sajnok	Poland
12	Vladyslav Kreminskyi	Ukraine
13	Julio Amores	Spain
14	Robbe Ghys	Belgium
15	Andreas Müller	Austria
16	Andrej Strmiska	Slovakia
17	Davide Plebani	Italy
18	Jan-Willem van Schip	Netherlands
