= Volodymyr Fredyuk =

Ukrainian road and track cyclist

Personal information
- Full name: Volodymyr Fredyuk
- Born: 14 August 1992 (age 34)

Cycling career
- Sport: Cycling
- Disciplines: Road; Track
- Role: Rider

Professional teams
- 2015–2016: Amore & Vita–Selle SMP
- 2018: Lviv Cycling Team

Volodymyr Fredyuk (born 14 August 1992) is a Ukrainian road and track cyclist, who last rode for UCI Continental team Lviv Cycling Team. Representing Ukraine at international competitions, Fredyuk won the under-23 Ukrainian National Time Trial Championships in 2014. He competed at the 2016 UEC European Track Championships in the team pursuit event.

== Major results ==
2014
1st Time trial, National Under-23 Road Championships
