= Daniel Staniszewski =

Polish cyclist

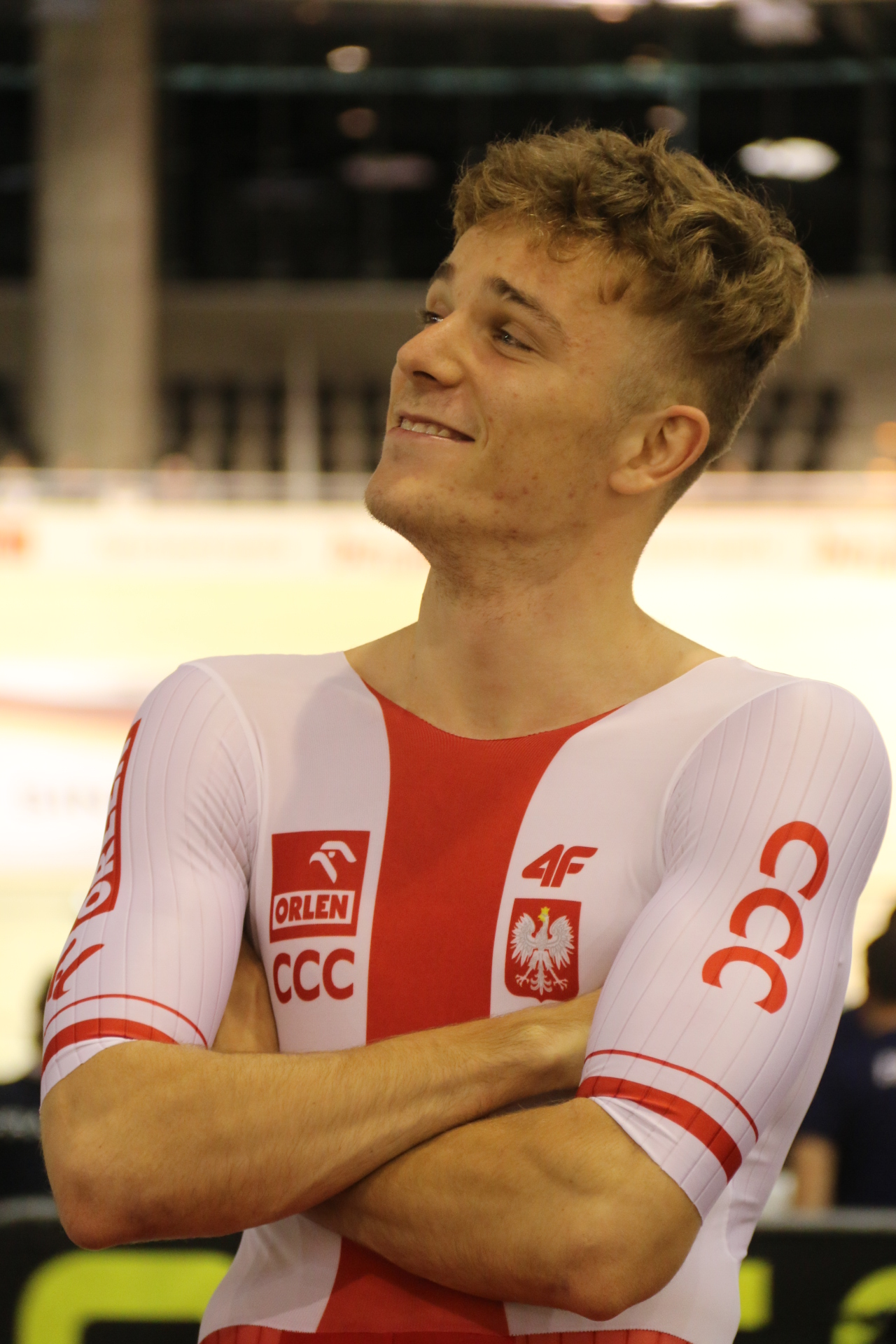
- Staniszewski in 2017

Personal information
- Full name: Daniel Staniszewski
- Born: 5 May 1997 (age 29) Ciechanów, Poland
- Height: 1.87 m (6 ft 2 in)
- Weight: 77 kg (170 lb)

Cycling career
- Sport: Cycling
- Current team: Mazowsze Serce Polski
- Disciplines: Track; Road
- Role: Rider

Amateur team
- 2017–2020: KS Pogoń Mostostal Puławy

Professional teams
- 2016: Verva ActiveJet
- 2020–: Mazowsze Serce Polski
Medal record
Representing Poland
Men's track cycling
European Games
Bronze medal – third place	2019 Minsk	Omnium
European Track Championships
Bronze medal – third place	2017 Berlin	Madison

Daniel Staniszewski (born 5 May 1997) is a Polish cyclist, who currently rides for UCI Continental team Mazowsze Serce Polski.

== Major results ==
=== Track ===
2014
2nd Individual pursuit, UEC European Junior Championships
2015
UEC European Junior Championships

1st Individual pursuit
3rd Team pursuit

National Championships

1st Individual pursuit
1st Scratch

2016
National Championships

1st Madison (with Norbert Banaszek)
2nd Individual pursuit

2nd Individual pursuit, UCI World Cup, Glasgow
3rd Madison (with Alan Banaszek), UEC European Under-23 Track Championships
2017
National Championships

1st Madison (with Wojciech Pszczolarski)
1st Individual pursuit
2nd Omnium
3rd Team pursuit

3rd Madison (with Wojciech Pszczolarski), UEC European Championships
UEC European Under-23 Championships

3rd Individual pursuit
3rd Team pursuit

3rd Madison (with Wojciech Pszczolarski), UCI World Cup, Manchester
2018
2nd Madison (with Wojciech Pszczolarski), UCI World Cup, Saint-Quentin-en-Yvelines
National Championships

3rd Madison
3rd Team pursuit

2019
1st Madison (with Filip Prokopyszyn), National Championships
2nd Omnium, UCI World Cup, Milton
3rd Omnium, European Games
2020
1st Individual pursuit, National Championships
2021
National Championships

1st Madison (with Alan Banaszek)
1st Team pursuit

2022
1st Elimination race, National Championships

=== Road ===
2015
3rd Time trial, National Junior Road Championships
