= Gaël Suter =

Swiss cyclist

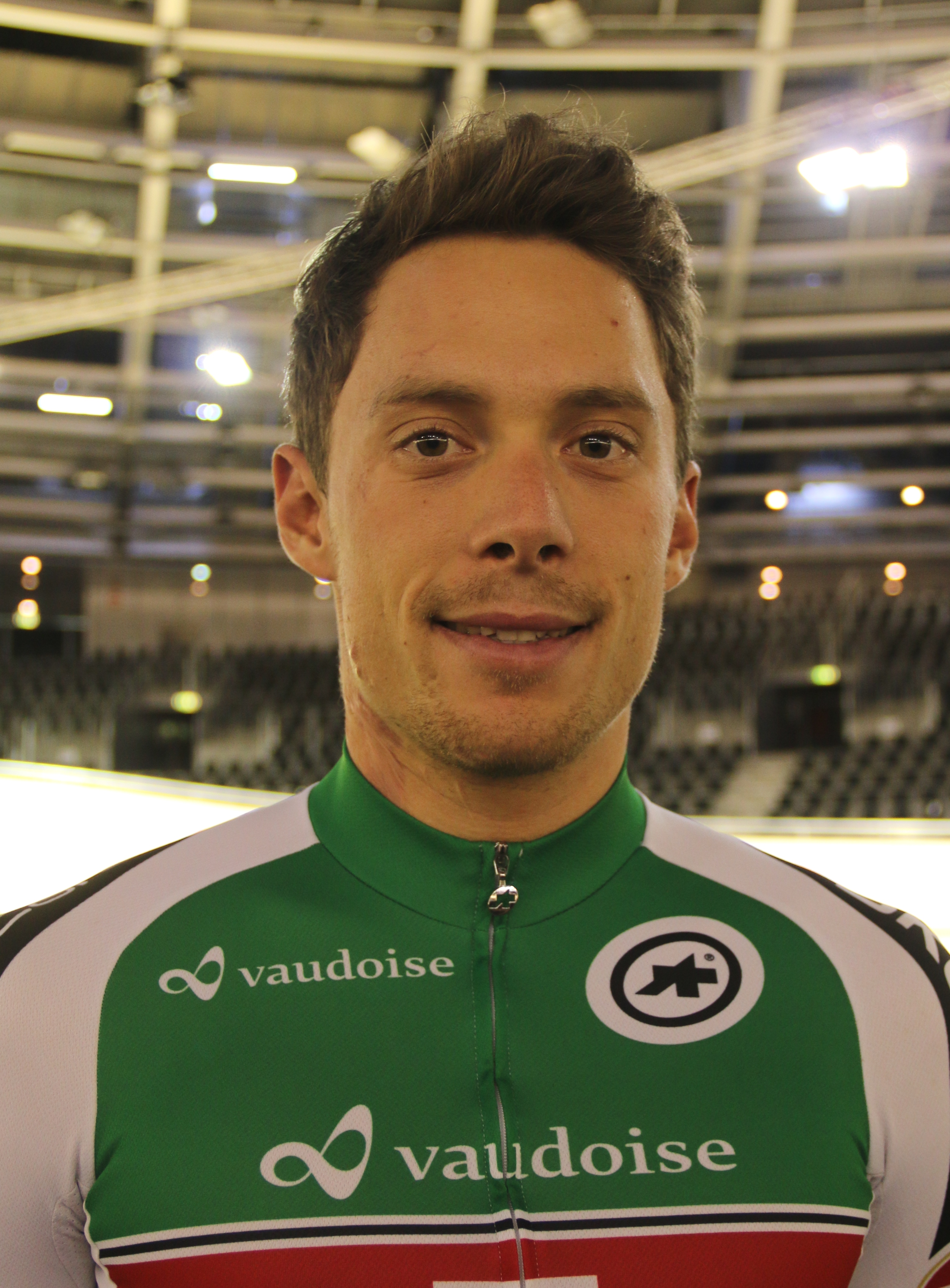
- Gaël Suter (2017)

Personal information
- Born: 23 March 1992 (age 34)

Cycling career
- Sport: Cycling
- Role: Rider
Medal record
Men's track cycling
Representing Switzerland
European Championships
Gold medal – first place	2016 Yvelines	Scratch
Silver medal – second place	2016 Yvelines	Omnium

Gaël Suter (born 23 March 1992) is a Swiss professional racing cyclist. He rode at the 2015 UCI Track Cycling World Championships. He won the gold medal in the scratch race at the 2016 UEC European Track Championships.
