= Andrej Strmiska =

Slovak cyclist

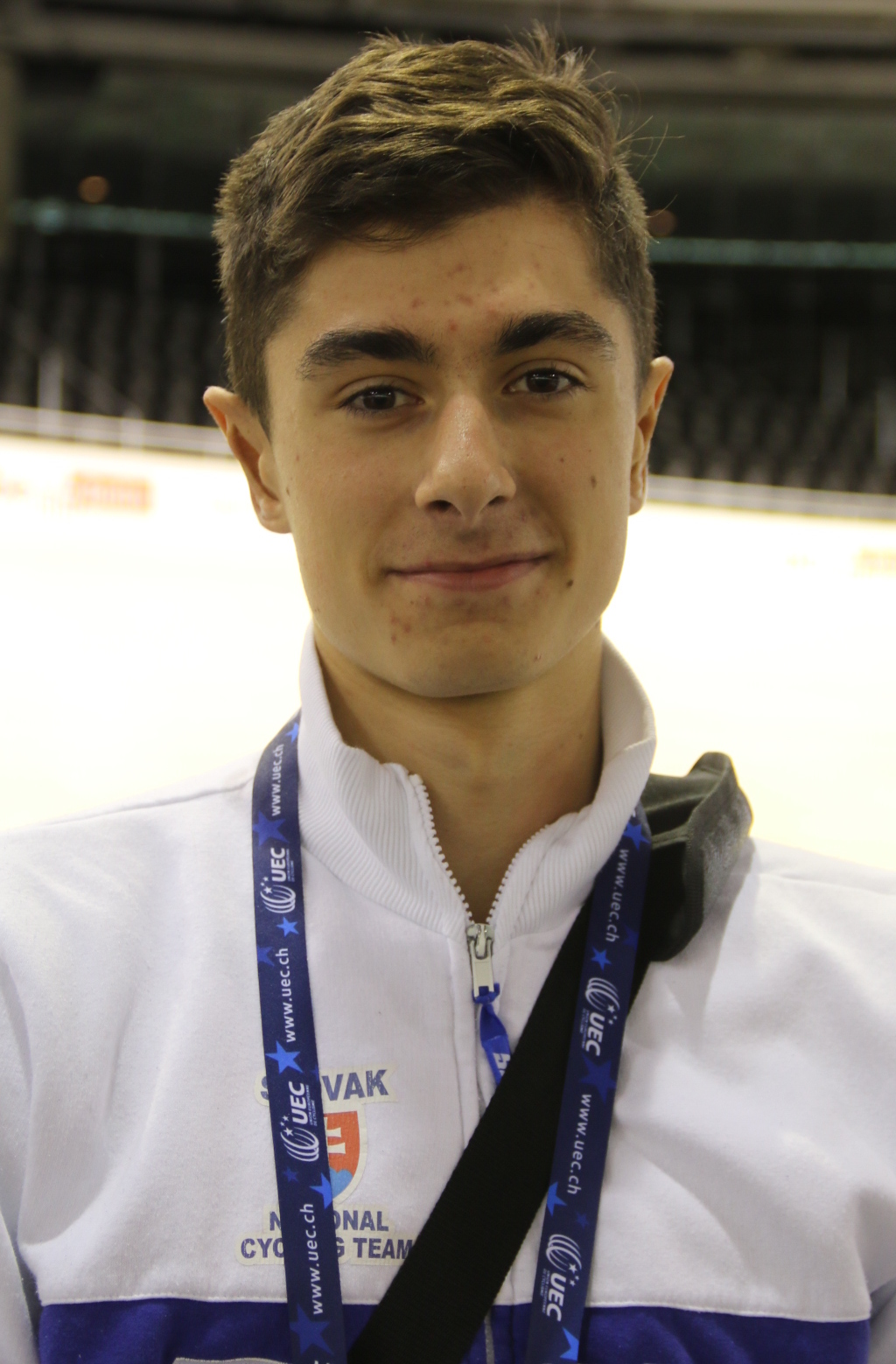
- Andrej Strmiska (2017)

Personal information
- Born: 22 October 1996 (age 29)

Cycling career
- Sport: Cycling
- Discipline: Track cycling

Andrej Strmiska (born 22 October 1996) is a Slovak male track cyclist, representing Slovakia at international competitions. He competed at the 2016 UEC European Track Championships in the elimination race event.
