= Anders Oddli =

Norwegian cyclist

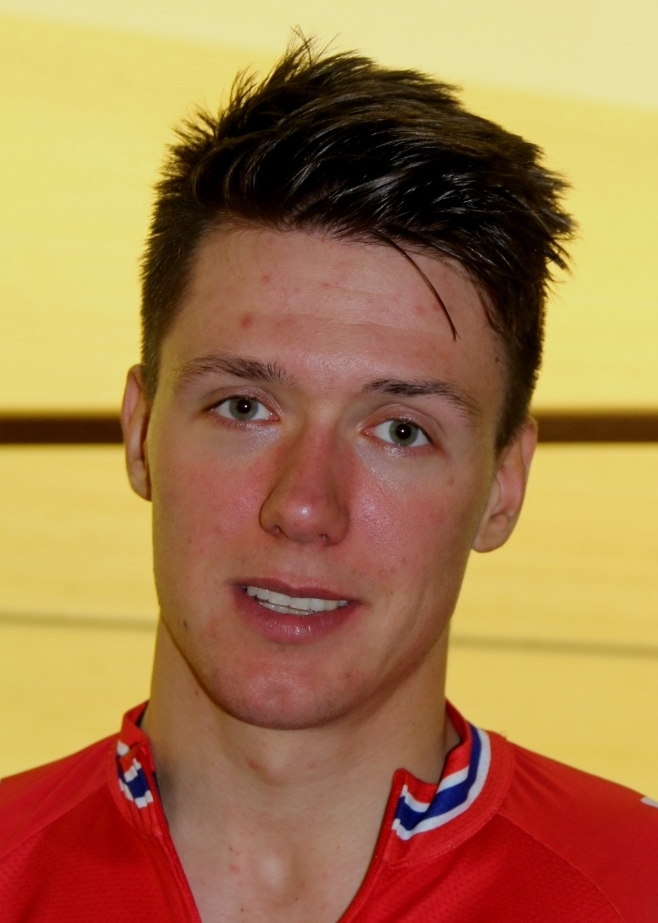
- Oddli in 2017

Personal information
- Full name: Anders Oddli
- Born: 22 April 1994 (age 32)

Cycling career
- Sport: Cycling
- Current team: Team Drali–Repsol
- Disciplines: Road; Track
- Role: Rider

Amateur teams
- 2016: IK Hero
- 2017–2019: Ryska Posten Racing Team
- 2020: Bygdø IL

Professional teams
- 2015: Team Frøy–Bianchi
- 2020–: Team Coop
Medal record
Men's track cycling
Representing Norway

Anders Oddli (born 22 April 1994) is a Norwegian road and track cyclist, who currently rides for UCI Continental team Team Drali–Repsol. Representing Norway at international competitions, Oddli competed at the 2016 UEC European Track Championships in the scratch event.
