= Benjamin Thomas (cyclist) =

French cyclist (born 1995)

Benjamin Thomas CLH OLY
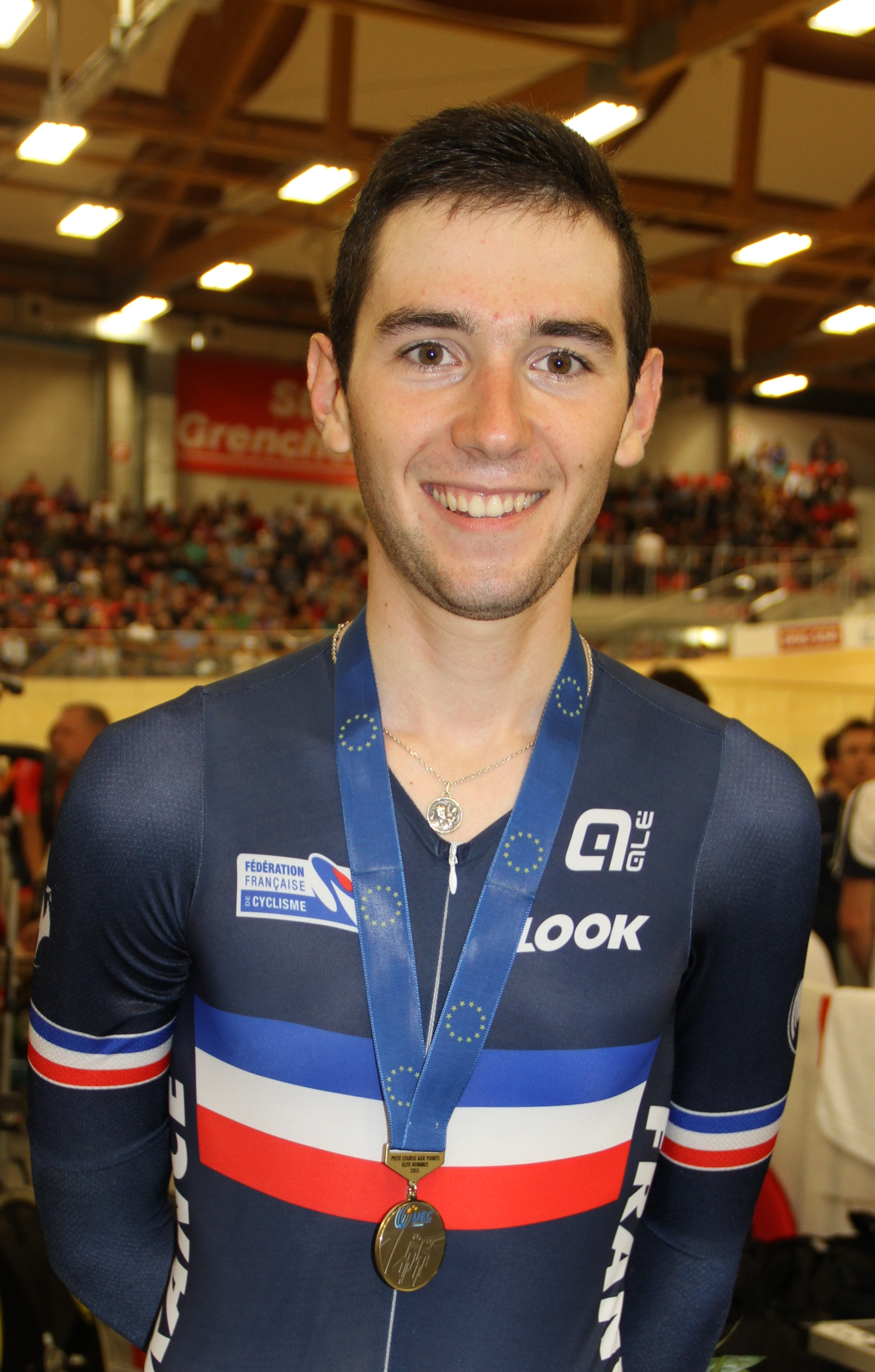
- Thomas at the 2015 UEC European Track Championships

Personal information
- Born: 12 September 1995 (age 31) Lavaur, France
- Height: 1.79 m (5 ft 10 in)
- Weight: 68 kg (150 lb)

Cycling career
- Sport: Cycling
- Current team: Cofidis
- Disciplines: Road; Track
- Role: Rider

Amateur teams
- 2012–2013: EC Giroussens Lavaur Junior
- 2014: Bourges EC 18

Professional teams
- 2015–2017: Armée de Terre
- 2018–2021: FDJ
- 2022–: Cofidis

Major wins
- Road Grand Tours Giro d'Italia 1 individual stage (2024) Stage races Boucles de la Mayenne (2022) One-day races and Classics National Time Trial Championships (2019, 2021) Track Olympic Games Omnium (2024) World Championships Madison (2017, 2022) Omnium (2017, 2020) Points race (2021)
Medal record
Representing France
Men's track cycling
Olympic Games
Gold medal – first place	2024 Paris	Omnium
Bronze medal – third place	2020 Tokyo	Madison
World Championships
Gold medal – first place	2017 Hong Kong	Omnium
Gold medal – first place	2017 Hong Kong	Madison
Gold medal – first place	2020 Berlin	Omnium
Gold medal – first place	2021 Roubaix	Points race
Gold medal – first place	2022 Saint-Quentin-en-Yvelines	Madison
Silver medal – second place	2016 London	Madison
Silver medal – second place	2019 Pruszków	Omnium
Silver medal – second place	2021 Roubaix	Team pursuit
Silver medal – second place	2022 Saint-Quentin-en-Yvelines	Omnium
Silver medal – second place	2023 Glasgow	Omnium
Silver medal – second place	2026 Shanghai	Points race
European Championships
Gold medal – first place	2014 Guadeloupe	Points race
Gold medal – first place	2016 Yvelines	Team pursuit
Gold medal – first place	2017 Berlin	Madison
Gold medal – first place	2017 Berlin	Team pursuit
Gold medal – first place	2019 Apeldoorn	Omnium
Gold medal – first place	2021 Grenchen	Points race
Gold medal – first place	2022 Munich	Points race
Gold medal – first place	2022 Munich	Team pursuit
Gold medal – first place	2023 Grenchen	Omnium
Silver medal – second place	2015 Grenchen	Points race
Silver medal – second place	2016 Yvelines	Madison
Bronze medal – third place	2016 Yvelines	Omnium
Bronze medal – third place	2017 Berlin	Omnium
Bronze medal – third place	2023 Grenchen	Madison
Bronze medal – third place	2023 Grenchen	Team pursuit
Men's road bicycle racing
European Championships
Gold medal – first place	2023 Drenthe	Mixed team relay

Benjamin Thomas (born 12 September 1995) is a French professional road and track cyclist, who currently rides for UCI WorldTeam Cofidis.

He rode at the 2015 UCI Track Cycling World Championships. In August 2018, he was named in the startlist for the 2018 Vuelta a España. In October 2020, he was named in the startlist for the 2020 Giro d'Italia.

He rode the Tour de France for the first time in 2022. On stage 15, Thomas broke away from the peloton and was attempting to get the first French win in over thirty stages, but was caught inside the final few hundred meters. After the stage he commented, "I believed I could make it. If we could have stayed together with Alexis maybe it would have been different… I'm completely dead, I'm seeing stars. I was not thinking anymore."

== Major results ==
=== Road ===
2017 (2 pro wins)
1st Stage 3 Four Days of Dunkirk
3rd Overall Tour de Wallonie

1st Young rider classification
1st Stage 1

4th Road race, National Under-23 Championships
4th Overall Tour de Luxembourg
4th Overall Tour du Poitou-Charentes
4th Grand Prix Pino Cerami
4th Ronde van Limburg
9th Boucles de l'Aulne
2018
1st Young rider classification, Étoile de Bessèges
3rd Time trial, National Championships
2019 (1)
1st Time trial, National Championships
6th Tour du Finistère
2020
2nd Time trial, National Championships
6th Overall Tour Poitou-Charentes en Nouvelle-Aquitaine
2021 (1)
1st Time trial, National Championships
2022 (4)
1st Overall Étoile de Bessèges

1st Stage 3

1st Overall Boucles de la Mayenne

1st Stage 2

National Championships

3rd Time trial
5th Road race

4th Overall Four Days of Dunkirk
4th Overall Tour Poitou-Charentes en Nouvelle-Aquitaine
5th Tour du Doubs
8th Overall Tour de Luxembourg
8th Bretagne Classic
2023 (1)
1st Team relay, UEC European Championships
1st Stage 3 (ITT) Four Days of Dunkirk
4th Time trial, National Championships
2024 (1)
1st Stage 5 Giro d'Italia
6th Trofeo Pollença–Port d'Andratx
2025
2nd Coppa Sabatini
2nd Cholet Agglo Tour
8th Overall Four Days of Dunkirk
9th Paris–Camembert
Tour de France

Held after Stage 1

==== Grand Tour general classification results timeline ====
Grand Tour	2018	2019	2020	2021	2022	2023	2024	2025
Giro d'Italia	—	—	DNF	—	—	—	DNF	—
Tour de France	—	—	—	—	53	—	—	
Vuelta a España	121	DNF	—	—	—	—	—	

Legend
—	Did not compete
DNF	Did not finish

=== Track ===
2013
1st Points race, UCI World Junior Championships
2014
1st Points race, UEC European Championships
1st Scratch, UEC European Under-23 Championships
2nd Scratch, National Championships
2015
2nd Points race, UEC European Championships
2nd Madison, UEC European Under-23 Championships (with Thomas Boudat)
National Championships

2nd Madison (with Julien Duval)
2nd Points race

2016
UEC European Championships

1st Team pursuit
2nd Madison (with Morgan Kneisky)
3rd Omnium

National Championships

1st Madison (with Jordan Levasseur)
1st Omnium
2nd Points race
2nd Scratch
3rd Team pursuit

2nd Madison, UCI World Championships (with Morgan Kneisky)
2nd Madison, UEC European Under-23 Championships (with Florian Maitre)
2017
UCI World Championships

1st Madison (with Morgan Kneisky)
1st Omnium

UEC European Championships

1st Madison (with Florian Maitre)
1st Team pursuit
3rd Omnium

UCI World Cup, Manchester

1st Omnium
2nd Madison
3rd Team pursuit

1st Six Days of Fiorenzuola (with Morgan Kneisky)
2nd Six Days of Ghent (with Morgan Kneisky)
National Championships

1st Omnium
2nd Points race
3rd Madison (with Kilian Evenot)

2018
1st Six Days of Fiorenzuola (with Morgan Kneisky)
2019
1st Omnium, UEC European Championships
2nd Omnium, UCI World Championships
2nd Madison, UCI World Cup, Minsk (with Bryan Coquard)
2020
1st Omnium, UCI World Championships
2021
UCI World Championships

1st Points race
2nd Team pursuit

1st Points race, UEC European Championships
3rd Madison, Olympic Games (with Donavan Grondin)
2022
UCI World Championships

1st Madison (with Donavan Grondin)
2nd Omnium

2023
UEC European Championships

1st Omnium
3rd Madison (with Donavan Grondin)
3rd Team pursuit

2nd Omnium, UCI World Championships
UCI Nations Cup

3rd Madison, Milton (with Thomas Boudat)
3rd Team pursuit, Milton

3rd Elimination, National Championships
2024
1st Omnium, Olympic Games
1st Six Days of Ghent (with Fabio Van den Bossche)
2026
2nd Points race, UCI World Championships

== Awards and honours ==
Orders

- Knight of the Legion of Honour: 2024
