= João Matias =

Portuguese cyclist (born 1991)

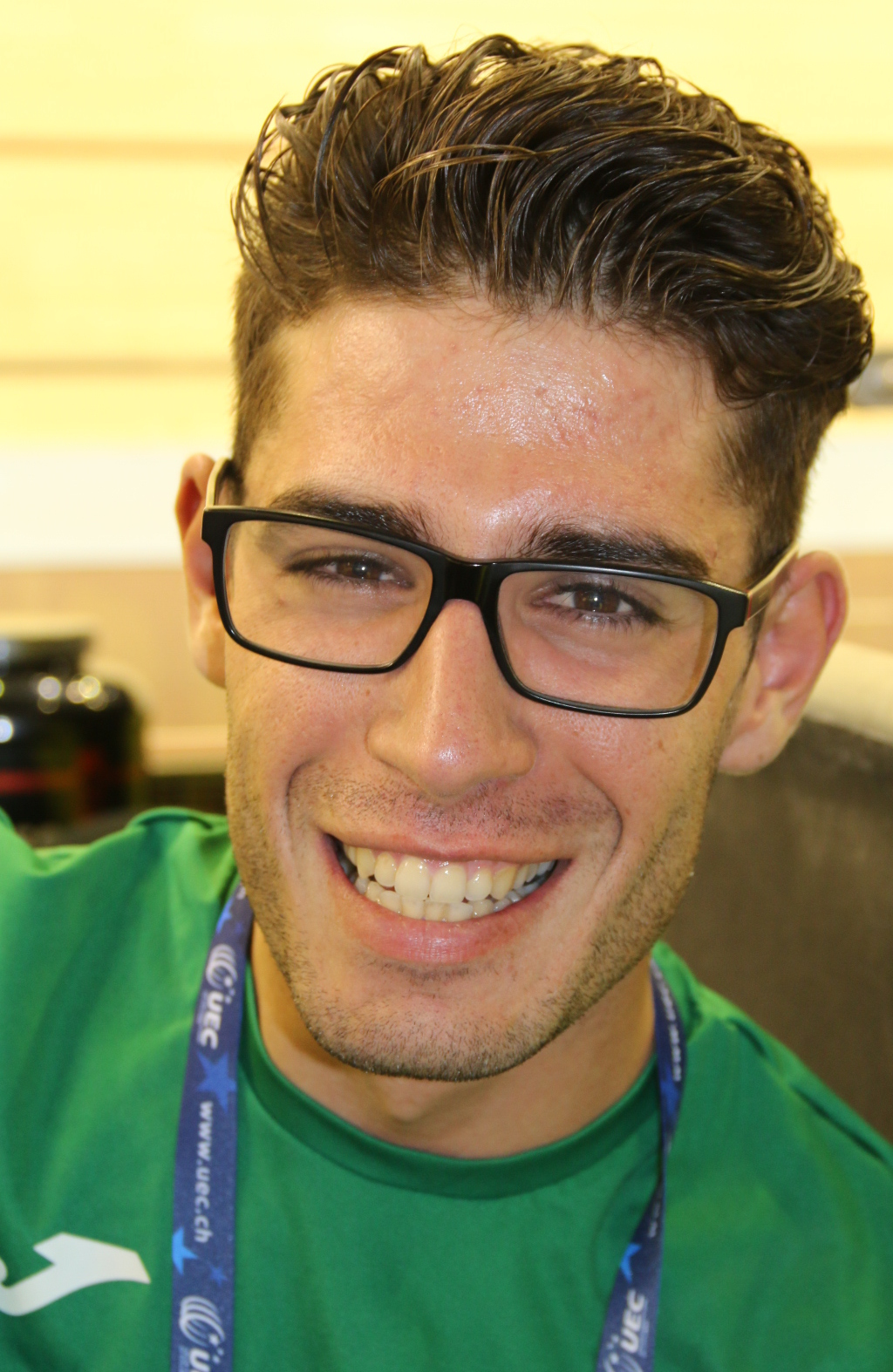
- Matias in 2017

Personal information
- Full name: João Carlos Araújo Matias
- Born: 26 May 1991 (age 35) Barcelos, Portugal
- Height: 1.80 m (5 ft 11 in)
- Weight: 72 kg (159 lb)

Cycling career
- Sport: Cycling
- Current team: Tavfer–Ovos Matinados–Mortágua
- Disciplines: Track; Road
- Role: Rider

Amateur teams
- 2010: Gondomar Coraçã de Ouro
- 2011–2012: Vitória–ASC–RTL
- 2016: Super Froiz

Professional teams
- 2013–2015: OFM–Quinta da Lixa
- 2017: LA Alumínios / Metalusa Blackjack
- 2018–2019: Vito–Feirense–BlackJack
- 2020–2021: Aviludo–Louletano
- 2022–: Tavfer–Mortágua–Ovos Matinados
Medal record
Men's track cycling
Representing Portugal
European Championships
Silver medal – second place	2021 Grenchen	Elimination race

João Carlos Araújo Matias (born 26 May 1991) is a Portuguese track and road cyclist, who currently rides for the UCI Continental team Tavfer–Ovos Matinados–Mortágua. Representing Portugal at international competitions, Matias competed at the 2016 UEC European Track Championships in the Madison, the 1 km time trial and the elimination race events. He has also competed in five editions of the UCI Track Cycling World Championships.

== Major results ==
=== Road ===
2013
5th Road race, National Under-23 Championships
2018
Grande Prémio de Portugal Nacional 2

1st Points classification
1st Stage 5

2019
1st Stage 1 Grande Prémio Jornal de Notícias
2022
1st Mountains classification, Volta ao Algarve
1st Stages 2 & 4 Volta a Portugal
5th Road race, National Championships
2023
1st Stage 3 Volta a Portugal
1st Stage 5 Grande Prémio O Jogo

=== Track ===
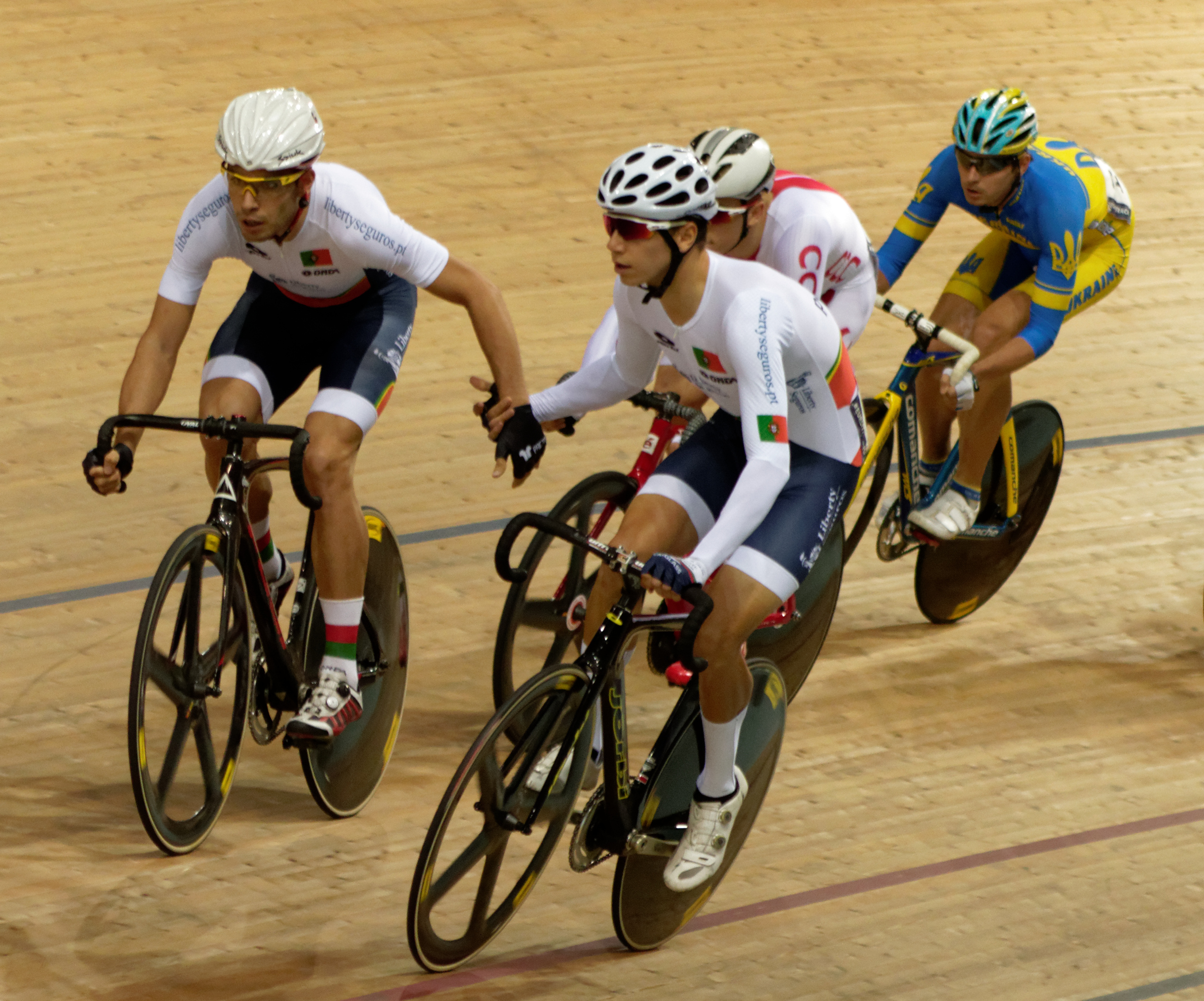
Matias (left) with Ivo Oliveira at the 2016 UEC European Track Championships.

2017
1st Scratch, National Championships
2018
1st Individual pursuit, National Championships
2019
1st Madison (with Rui Oliveira), National Championships
2020
National Championships

1st Points race
1st Individual pursuit

2021
2nd Elimination, UEC European Championships
2022
National Championships

1st Omnium
1st Madison (with Iúri Leitão)
