= Filip Taragel =

Slovak cyclist (born 1992)

Personal information
- Nickname: Filip Taragel
- Born: 19 May 1992 (age 34): Bratislava, Czechoslovakia; (now Slovakia)

Cycling career
- Sport: Cycling
- Current team: Retired
- Disciplines: Track; Road
- Role: Rider

Amateur team
- 2016–2017: Firefly

Professional teams
- 2012–2014: Dukla Trenčín–Trek
- 2015: Ex23–Saroni Factory Team
- 2018: Dukla Banská Bystrica

Filip Taragel (born 19 May 1992) is a Slovak former road and track cyclist. He competed at the 2016 UEC European Track Championships in the scratch event.

== Major results ==
2010
1st Road race, National Junior Road Championships
2012
2nd Time trial, National Under-23 Road Championships
2014
2nd Road race, National Under-23 Road Championships
2017
National Track Championships

1st Omnium
1st Points race
1st Scratch

2018
1st Stage 1 Grand Prix Chantal Biya
