= Albert Torres (cyclist) =

Spanish racing cyclist

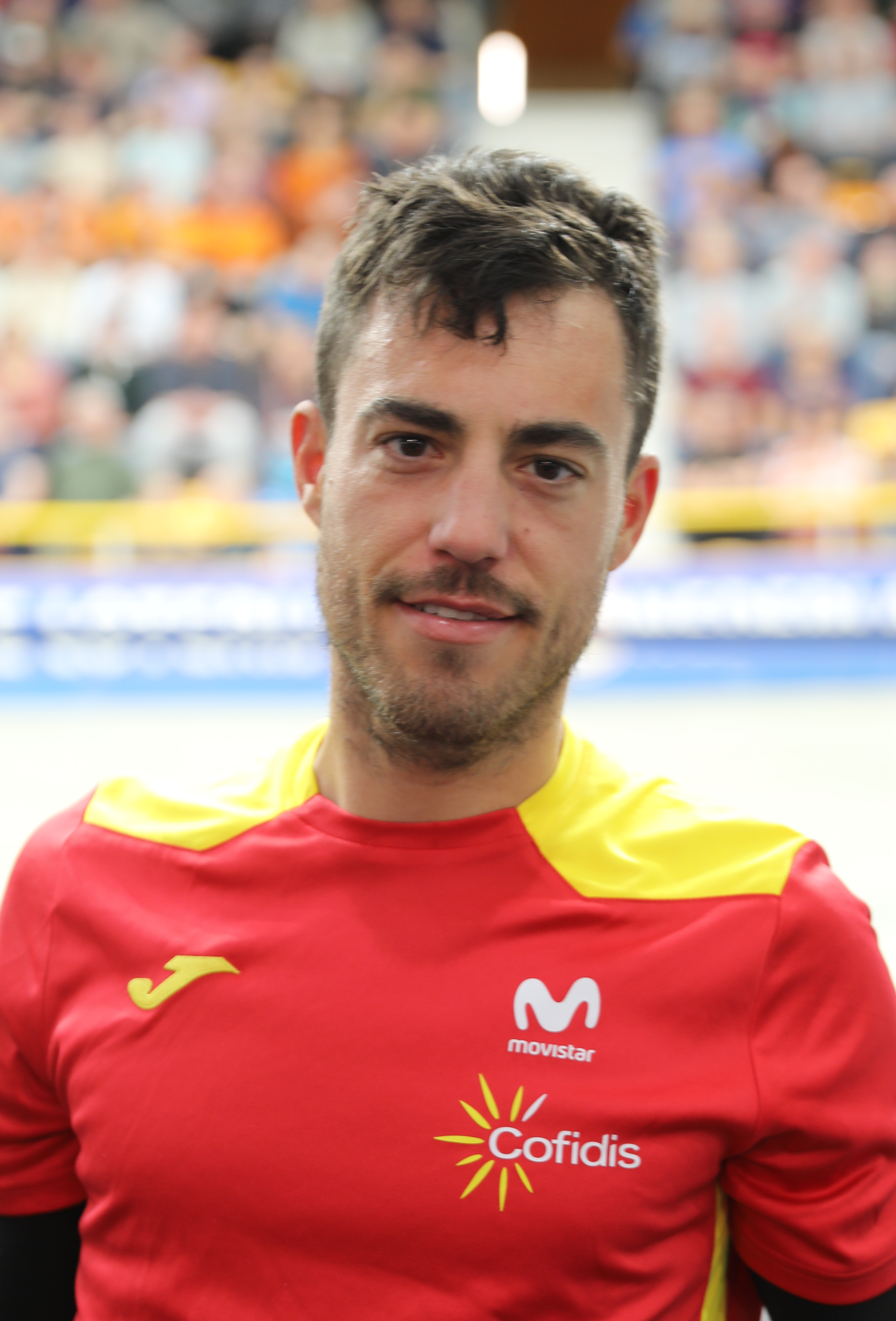
- Torres in 2024

Personal information
- Full name: Albert Torres Barceló
- Born: 26 April 1990 (age 36) Ciutadella de Menorca, Spain
- Height: 180 cm (5 ft 11 in)
- Weight: 70 kg (154 lb)

Cycling career
- Sport: Cycling
- Current team: Movistar Team
- Disciplines: Track; Road
- Role: Rider

Amateur teams
- 2011–2012: Azysa-Conor-WRC
- 2011: Geox–TMC (stagiaire)
- 2012: Androni Giocattoli–Venezuela (stagiaire)
- 2013: Atika-Asmeval
- 2019: Grup Esportiu Es Port

Professional teams
- 2014–2016: Team Ecuador
- 2016: Team Raleigh–GAC
- 2017–2018: Inteja Dominican Cycling Team
- 2020–: Movistar Team

Major wins
- Track World Championships Madison (2014) Omnium (2025)
Medal record
Men's track cycling
Representing Spain
World Championships
| Gold medal – first place | 2014 Cali | Madison |
| Gold medal – first place | 2025 Santiago | Omnium |
| Silver medal – second place | 2013 Minsk | Madison |
| Silver medal – second place | 2015 Yvelines | Scratch |
| Silver medal – second place | 2018 Apeldoorn | Madison |
| Silver medal – second place | 2023 Glasgow | Points race |
| Bronze medal – third place | 2016 London | Madison |
| Bronze medal – third place | 2017 Hong Kong | Omnium |
European Championships
| Gold medal – first place | 2015 Grenchen | Madison |
| Gold medal – first place | 2016 Yvelines | Omnium |
| Gold medal – first place | 2016 Yvelines | Madison |
| Gold medal – first place | 2017 Berlin | Omnium |
| Gold medal – first place | 2020 Plovdiv | Madison |
| Silver medal – second place | 2013 Apeldoorn | Madison |
| Silver medal – second place | 2023 Grenchen | Points race |
U23 & Junior European Championships
| Silver medal – second place | 2008 Pruszków | Junior Points race |
| Silver medal – second place | 2012 Anadia | U23 Individual pursuit |
| Bronze medal – third place | 2007 Cottbus | Junior Individual pursuit |
| Bronze medal – third place | 2011 Anadia | U23 Individual pursuit |
| Bronze medal – third place | 2012 Anadia | U23 Madison |

Albert Torres Barceló (born 26 April 1990) is a Spanish track and road racing cyclist, who currently rides for UCI WorldTeam Movistar Team. Torres turned professional in 2014 with Team Ecuador. In October 2020, he was named in the startlist for the 2020 Giro d'Italia.

== Major results ==
=== Road ===
2008
1st Road race, National Junior Championships
2010
1st Road race, National Under-23 Championships
2012
2nd Time trial, National Under-23 Championships
2016
5th Trofeo Playa de Palma
10th Trofeo Felanitx–Ses Salines–Campos–Porreres
2017
Vuelta Independencia Nacional

1st Points classification
1st Stage 2

5th Vuelta a La Rioja
2018
5th Trofeo Felanitx–Ses Salines–Campos–Porreres
6th Trofeo Palma

=== Grand Tour general classification results timeline ===
| Grand Tour | 2020 | 2021 | 2022 | 2023 | 2024 |
|---|---|---|---|---|---|
| Giro d'Italia | 106 | 138 | — | 122 | 68 |
| Tour de France | — | — | 133 | — | — |
| Vuelta a España | — | — | — | — | — |

Legend
| — | Did not compete |
| DNF | Did not finish |

=== Track ===
2007
3rd Individual pursuit, UEC European Junior Championships
2008
UEC European Junior Championships

1st Individual pursuit
2nd Points race

2013
2nd Madison, UCI World Championships (with David Muntaner)
2nd Madison, UEC European Championships (with David Muntaner)
2014
1st Madison, UCI World Championships (with David Muntaner)
2015
1st Madison, UEC European Championships (with Sebastián Mora)
2nd Scratch, UCI World Championships
2016
UEC European Championships

1st Omnium
1st Madison (with Sebastián Mora)

1st Madison, UCI World Cup, Glasgow (with Sebastián Mora)
1st Six Days of Rotterdam (with Sebastián Mora)
2017
1st Omnium, UEC European Championships
2020
1st Madison, UEC European Championships (with Sebastián Mora)
2023
2nd Points race, UCI World Championships
2nd Points race, UEC European Championships
2025
1st Omnium, UCI World Championships
1st Madison, UCI Nations Cup, Konya (with Sebastián Mora)
