= Szymon Sajnok =

Polish cyclist

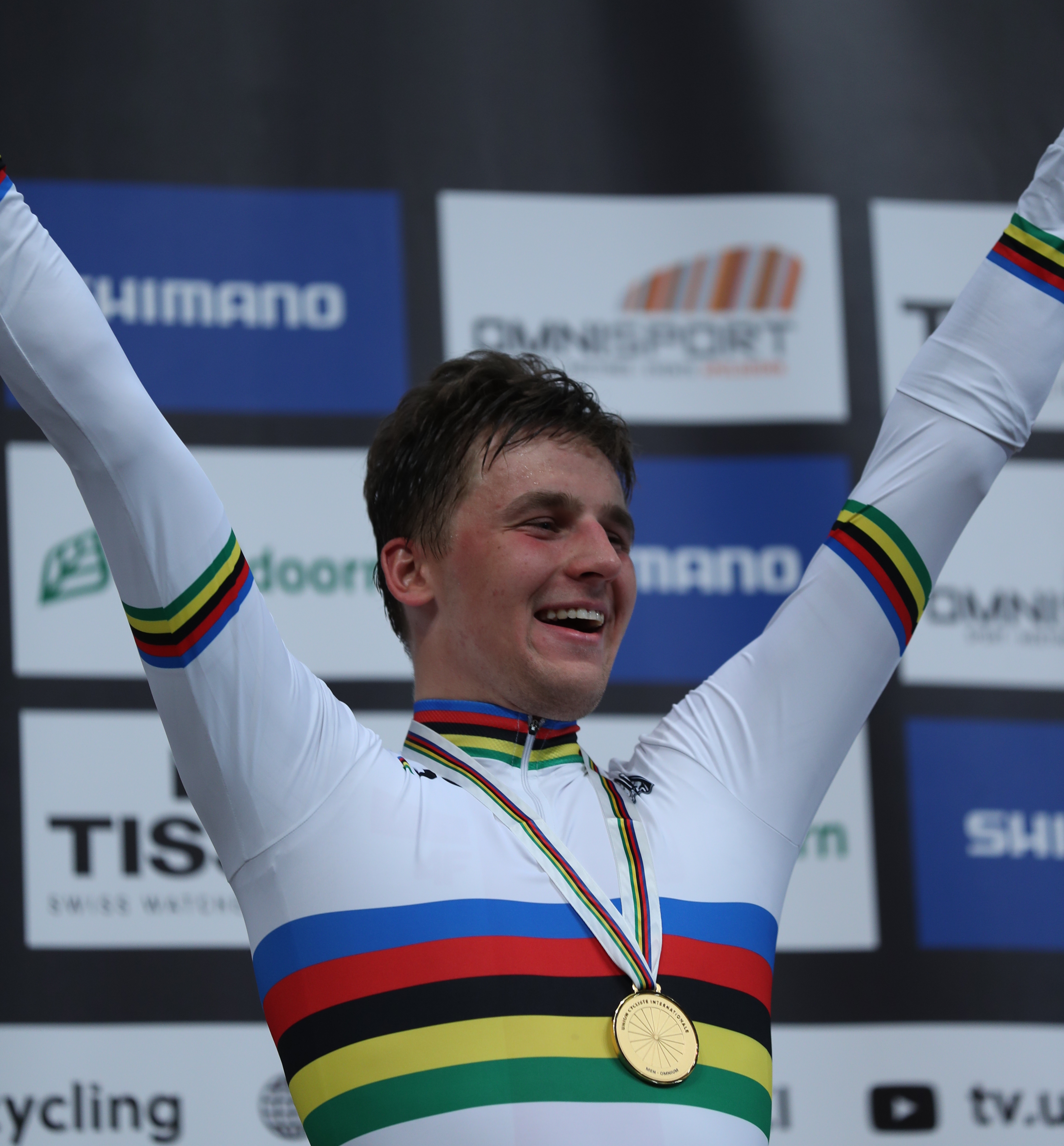
- Sajnok in 2018.

Personal information
- Full name: Szymon Wojciech Sajnok
- Born: 24 August 1997 (age 29) Kartuzy, Poland
- Height: 1.84 m (6 ft 0 in)
- Weight: 75 kg (165 lb)

Cycling career
- Sport: Cycling
- Disciplines: Road; Track
- Role: Rider

Amateur team
- 2016: GKS Cartusia Kartuzy

Professional teams
- 2017: Attaque Team Gusto
- 2018: CCC–Sprandi–Polkowice
- 2019–2020: CCC Team
- 2021–2022: Cofidis
- 2023–2024: Q36.5 Pro Cycling Team

Major wins
- Track Omnium, World Championships (2018)
Medal record
Men's track cycling
Representing Poland
World Championships
Gold medal – first place	2018 Apeldoorn	Omnium
UEC European Championships (under-23)
Silver medal – second place	2016 Montichiari	Omnium

Szymon Wojciech Sajnok (born 24 August 1997) is a Polish road and track cyclist, who last rode for UCI ProTeam Q36.5 Pro Cycling Team.

== Career ==
As a junior, he participated at the 2014 UCI Road World Championships in the Men's junior time trial and at the 2015 UCI Road World Championships also in the Men's junior time trial. On the track he competed at the 2016 UEC European Track Championships in the elimination race event and team pursuit event.

In August 2019, he was named in the startlist for the 2019 Vuelta a España.

In September 2020, Sajnok signed a two-year contract with the Cofidis team, from the 2021 season.

== Major results ==
=== Cyclo-cross ===
2013–2014
2nd National Junior Championships
2014–2015
1st National Junior Championships

=== Mountain bike ===
2014
1st Cross-country, National Junior Championships
3rd Eliminator, Summer Youth Olympics

=== Road ===
2015
1st Time trial, National Junior Championships
1st Stage 2 Coupe du Président de la Ville de Grudziądz
5th Paris–Roubaix Juniors
2016
7th GP Slovakia
2017
1st Prologue Tour de Kumano
2nd Time trial, National Under-23 Championships
2018
1st Overall Dookoła Mazowsza

1st Young rider classification
1st Prologue, Stages 1 & 2

2nd Memoriał Romana Siemińskiego
3rd Rund um Köln
7th Overall Szlakiem Walk Majora Hubala

1st Points classification

9th Münsterland Giro
2019
1st Time trial, National Under-23 Championships
4th Bredene Koksijde Classic
2020
2nd Road race, National Championships
2024
3rd Time trial, National Championships

==== Grand Tour general classification results timeline ====
Grand Tour	2019
Giro d'Italia	—
Tour de France	—
Vuelta a España	142

Legend
—	Did not compete
DNF	Did not finish

=== Track ===
2016
1st Omnium, UCI World Cup, Apeldoorn
2nd Omnium, UEC European Under-23 Championships
2017
1st Omnium, UCI World Cup, Los Angeles
National Championships

1st Omnium
1st Points race
1st Scratch

2018
1st Omnium, UCI World Championships
