= Martin Chren (cyclist) =

Slovak cyclist (born 1999)

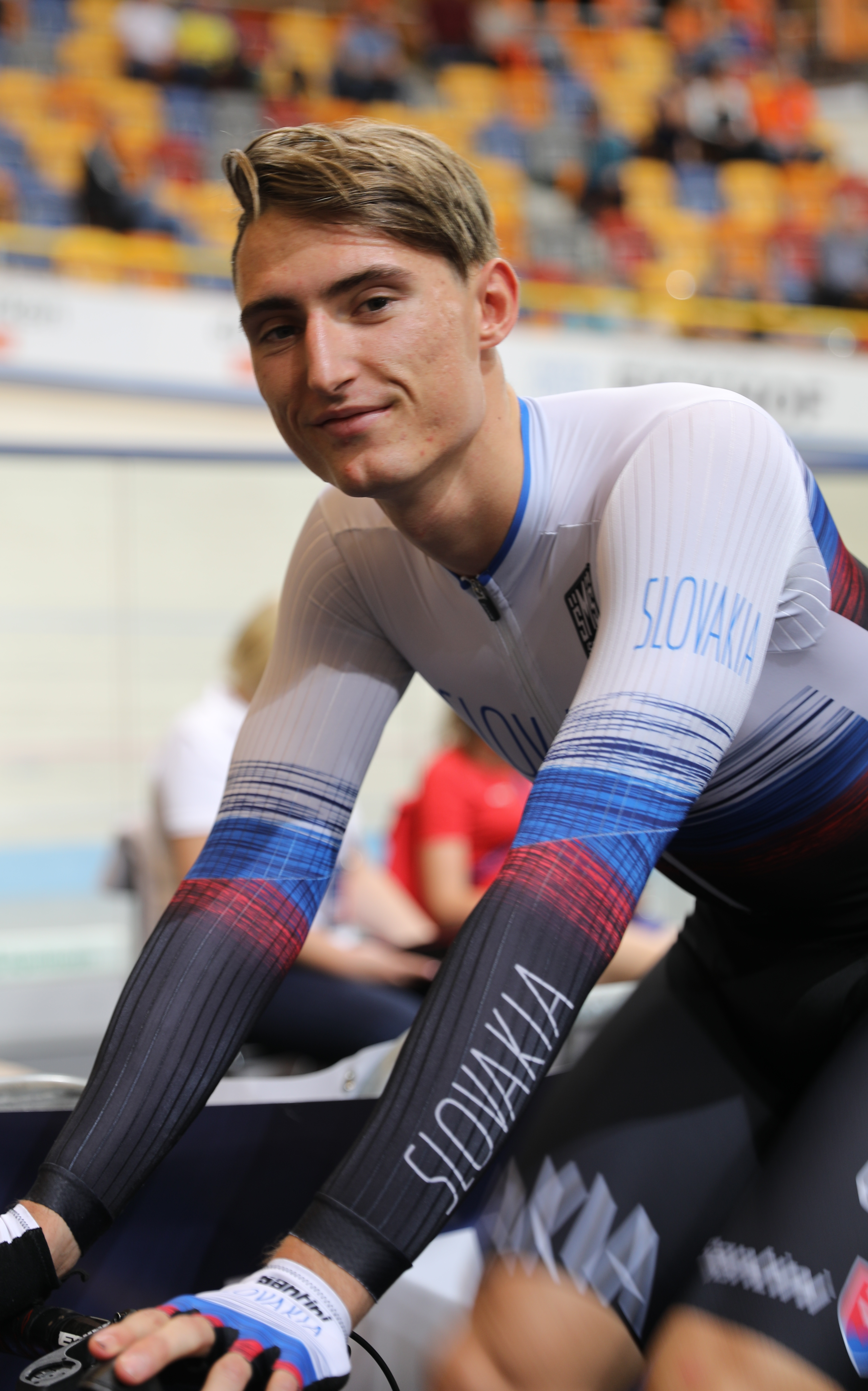
- Chren at the 2019 UEC European Track Championships

Personal information
- Born: 8 May 1999 (age 27)
- Height: 1.79 m (5 ft 10 in)
- Weight: 72 kg (159 lb)

Cycling career
- Sport: Cycling
- Current team: Tufo–Pardus Prostějov
- Disciplines: Road; Track
- Role: Rider

Amateur team
- 2018: CK Spartak Tlmače

Professional teams
- 2019–2023: Dukla Banská Bystrica
- 2024–: TUFO–Pardus Prostějov

Martin Chren (born 8 May 1999) is a Slovak cyclist, who currently rides for UCI Continental team Tufo–Pardus Prostějov. He competed at the 2021 UCI Track Cycling World Championships, 2022 UCI Track Cycling World Championships, 2023 UCI Track Cycling World Championships, 2024 UCI Track Cycling World Championships, 2025 UCI Track Cycling World Championships.

== Major results ==
=== Track ===
2018
National Championships

1st Individual pursuit
2nd Kilometer
3rd Madison

2019
National Championships

1st Points race
1st Omnium
1st Scratch
1st Kilometer

2020
National Championships

2nd Scratch
2nd Kilometer
2nd Elimination race

2021
National Championships

1st Points race
2nd Omnium
3rd Scratch

1st Scratch, GP Framar
2nd Scratch, GP Prostejov
2022
National Championships

1st Points race
1st Omnium
1st Scratch
1st Individual pursuit
1st Elimination

1st Scratch, Athens, Greece
2023
National Championships

1st Points race
1st Scratch
2nd Omnium
2nd Elimination

1st Scratch, Pordenone, Italy
3rd Scratch, GP Brno, Czechia
2024
2nd Point race, Pordenone, Italy
2nd Scratch, Budapest, Hungary
3rd Scratch, Pordenone, Italy
3rd Scratch, Singen, Germany
2025
National Championships

1st Points race
1st Omnium
1st Scratch
1st Elimination

3rd Omnium, Trinidad and Tobago
3rd Scratch, Trinidad and Tobago
3rd Scratch, Prešov, Slovakia
3rd Elimination, Prešov, Slovakia
3rd Scratch, Brno, Czechia
2026
National Championships

1st Points race
1st Omnium
3rd Scratch

2nd Scratch, Nilai, Malaysia

=== Road ===
2020
5th Time trial, National Under-23 Road Championships
2021
4th Road race, National Under-23 Road Championships
2023
4th Overall Grand Prix Chantal Biya
1st Stage 5
2nd Stage 2

=== Gravel ===
2023
2nd National Championships
2024
1st National Championships
