= Nicolas Pietrula =

Czech cyclist (born 1995)

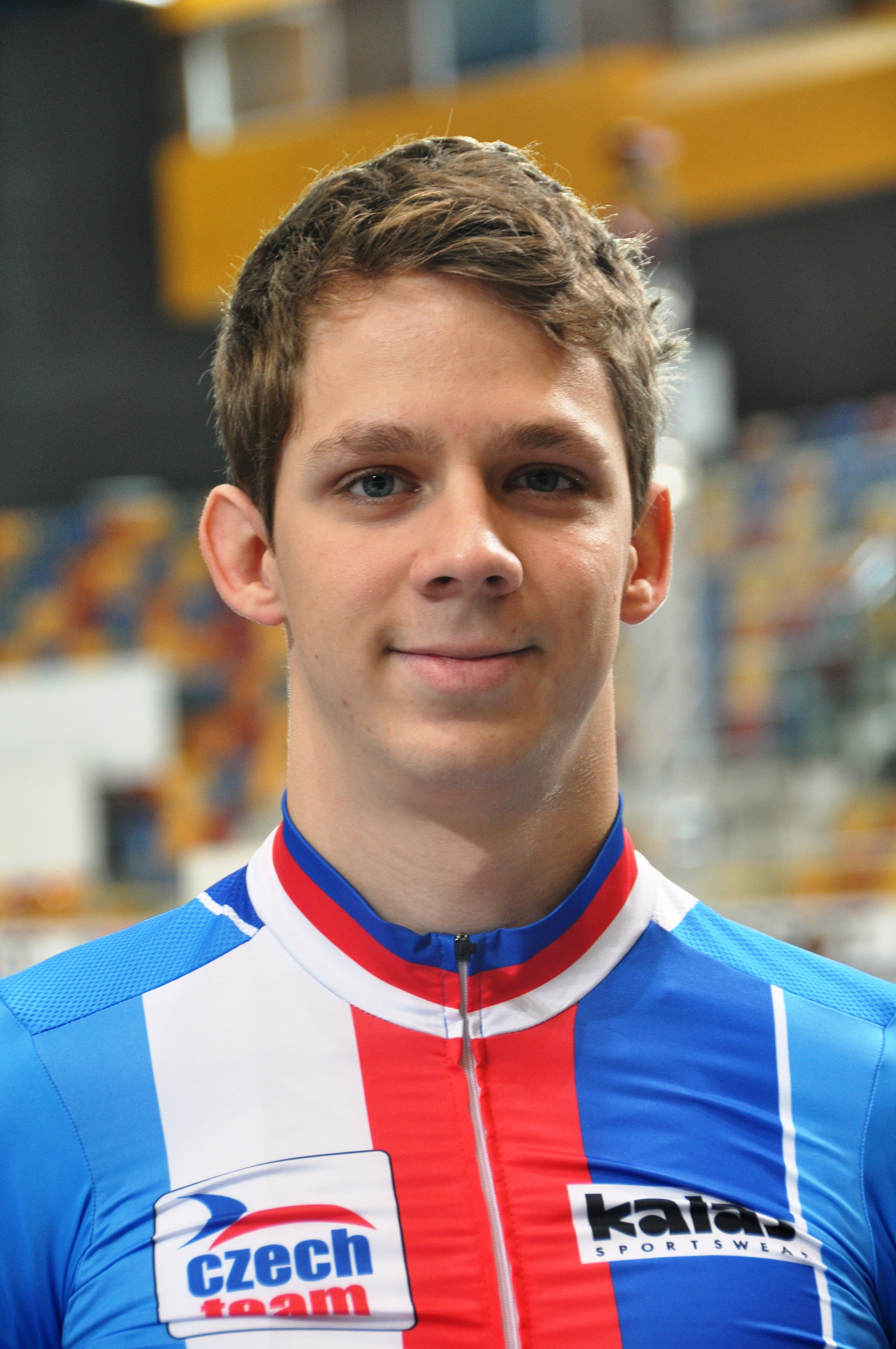
- Nicolas Pietrula (2016)

Personal information
- Born: 5 August 1995 (age 31) Příbram, Czech Republic

Cycling career
- Sport: Cycling
- Current team: Team Dukla Praha
- Disciplines: Track; Road

Amateur teams
- 2017: Team Dukla Praha
- 2019–: Team Dukla Praha

Professional teams
- 2014–2016: ASC Dukla Praha
- 2018: Team Dukla Praha

Nicolas Pietrula (born 5 August 1995) is a Czech road and track cyclist. He competed at the 2015 UEC European Track Championships in the team pursuit event and at the 2016 UEC European Track Championships also in the team pursuit event.

== Major results ==
2013
2nd Time trial, National Junior Road Championships
2014
1st Team pursuit, National Track Championships
2016
3rd Time trial, National Under-23 Road Championships
2017
National Track Championships

1st Team pursuit
1st Individual pursuit
1st Points race
1st Omnium

1st Time trial, National Under-23 Road Championships
5th Time trial, National Road Championships
2018
National Track Championships

1st Team pursuit
1st Individual pursuit

4th Time trial, National Road Championships
2019
National Track Championships

1st Team pursuit
1st Individual pursuit
1st Points race

2021
National Track Championships

1st Scratch
1st Individual pursuit
