= Raman Tsishkou =

Belarusian cyclist (born 1994)

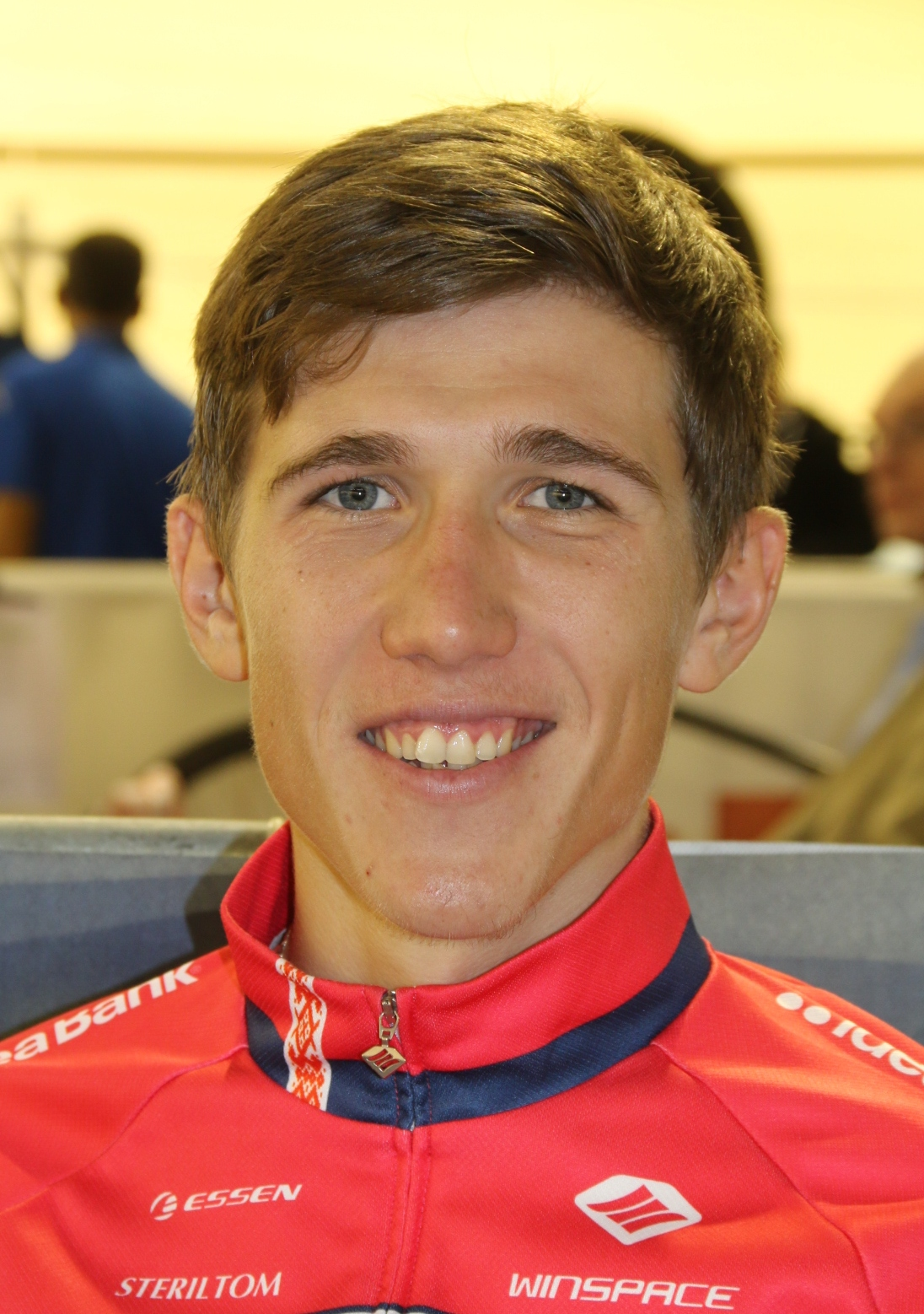
- Tsishkou in 2017

Personal information
- Full name: Raman Tsishkou
- Born: 2 December 1994 (age 31) Kirawsk, Belarus
- Height: 1.81 m (5 ft 11 in)
- Weight: 72 kg (159 lb)

Cycling career
- Sport: Cycling
- Current team: Li-Ning Star
- Disciplines: Track; Road
- Role: Rider

Professional teams
- 2017: Minsk Cycling Club
- 2021: BelAZ
- 2024: Huansheng–SCOM–Taishan Sport Cycling Team
- 2025–: Li-Ning Star

Raman Tsishkou (born 2 December 1994) is a Belarusian professional racing cyclist, who currently rides for UCI Continental team Li-Ning Star. He rode at the 2015 UCI Track Cycling World Championships.

== Major results ==
=== Road ===
2014
1st Time trial, National Under–23 Road Championships
2015
2nd Time trial, National Under–23 Road Championships
5th Time trial, National Road Championships
2016
5th Time trial, National Road Championships
2017
5th Time trial, National Road Championships
2021
1st Grand Prix Gazipaşa
5th Time trial, National Road Championships
6th Grand Prix Develi
6th Kahramanmaraş Grand Prix Road Race
2025 (2 pro wins)
1st Overall Trans-Himalaya Cycling Race

1st Stage 1

2026 (1)
1st Overall Trans-Himalaya Cycling Race
3rd Overall Grand Prix Fergana
5th Road race, National Road Championships

=== Track ===
2015
3rd Team pursuit, UEC European Under-23 Championships
2018
2nd Six Days of Turin (with Yauheni Akhramenka)
3rd Six Days of Fiorenzuola (with Yauheni Akhramenka)
2019
2018–19 UCI World Cup

2nd Omnium, Cambridge
