= Wojciech Pszczolarski =

Polish cyclist (born 1991)

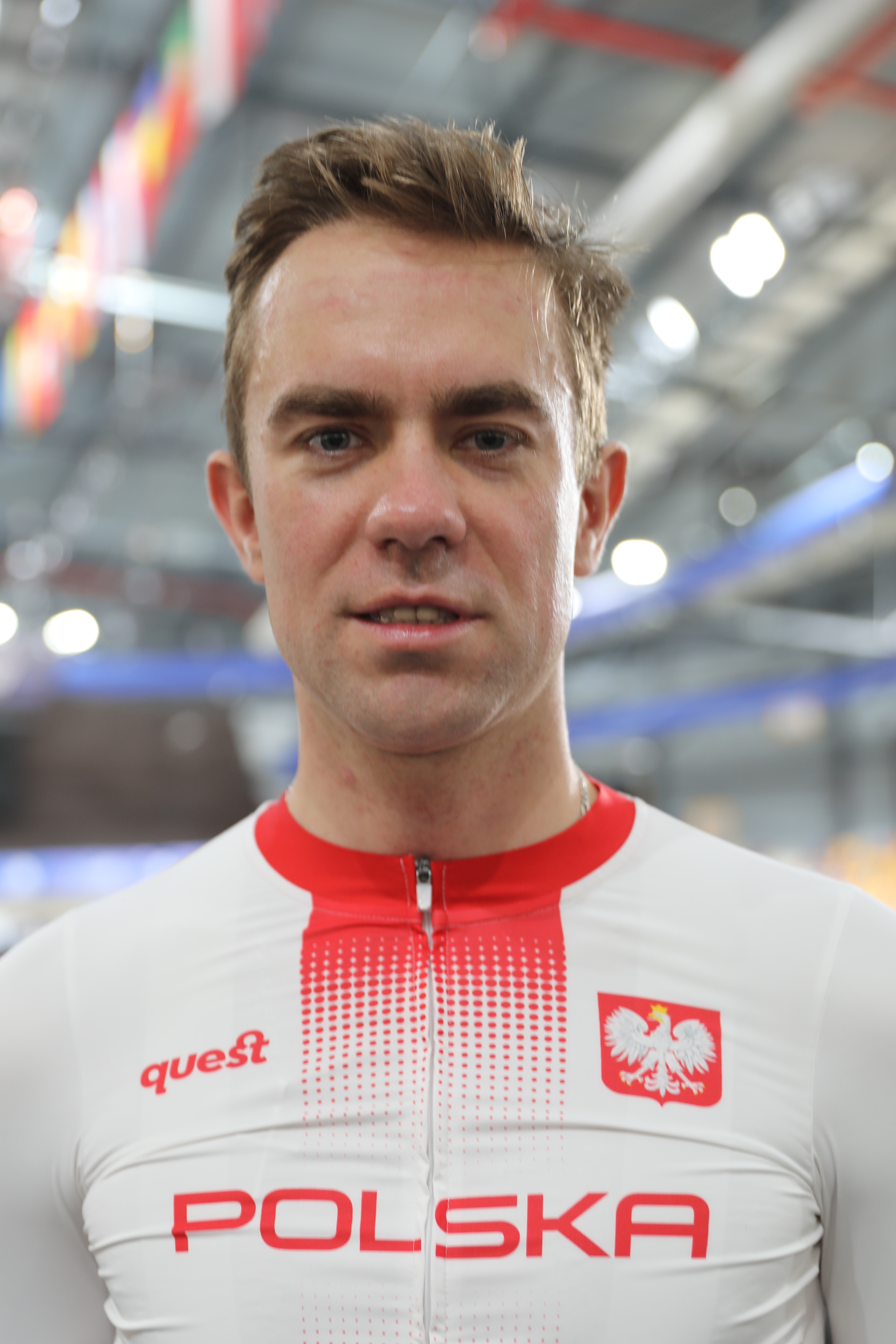
- Pszczolarski in 2024

Personal information
- Full name: Wojciech Pszczolarski
- Born: 26 April 1991 (age 35) Wrocław, Poland
- Height: 1.86 m (6 ft 1 in)
- Weight: 73 kg (161 lb)

Cycling career
- Sport: Cycling
- Current team: Tufo–Pardus Prostějov
- Disciplines: Road; Track
- Role: Rider

Professional teams
- 2014–2020: SKC TUFO Prostějov
- 2020: Wibatech Merx 7R
- 2021–: TUFO–Pardus Prostějov
Medal record
World Championships
Bronze medal – third place	2017 Hong Kong	Points race
European Track Championships
Gold medal – first place	2015 Grenchen	Points race
Gold medal – first place	2018 Glasgow	Points race
Bronze medal – third place	2017 Berlin	Madison

Wojciech Pszczolarski (born 26 April 1991) is a Polish professional racing cyclist, who currently rides for UCI Continental team Tufo–Pardus Prostějov. He rode at the 2015 UCI Track Cycling World Championships.
