= Felix English =

Irish cyclist (born 1992)

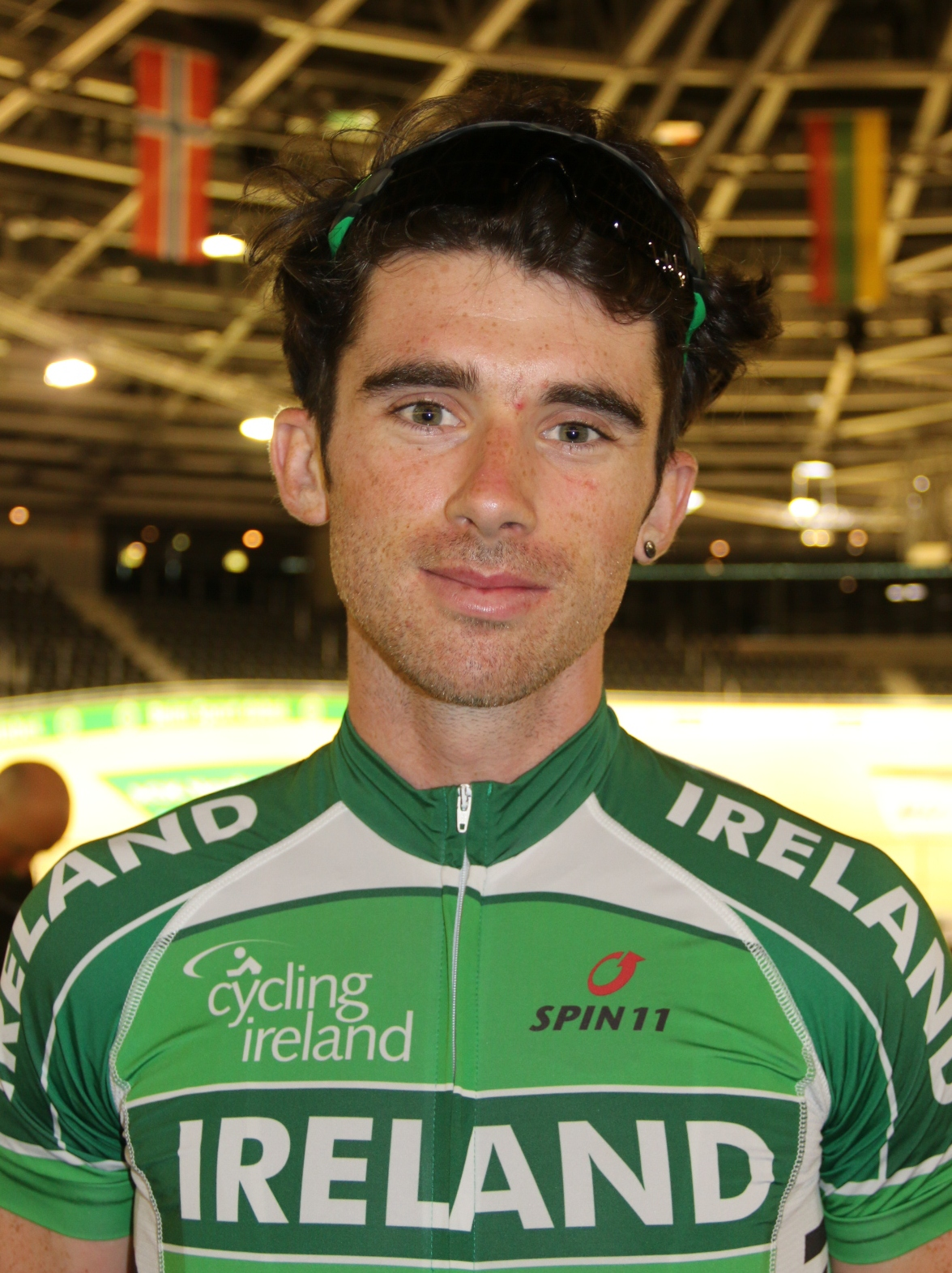
- English at the 2017 UEC European Track Championships

Personal information
- Full name: Felix English
- Born: 11 October 1992 (age 34) Brighton
- Height: 177 cm (5 ft 10 in)
- Weight: 68 kg (150 lb)

Cycling career
- Sport: Cycling
- Current team: Madison Genesis
- Disciplines: Track, road
- Role: Riding
- Rider type: Track Endurence

Amateur team
- Preston Park Youth CC

Professional teams
- 2012–2015: Rapha Condor–Sharp
- 2016–: Madison Genesis

Felix English (born 11 October 1992) is a professional cyclist from Brighton who rides for Ireland.

English rides on the road and on the track. As a junior, he won five British national titles until he decided in 2010 to represent Ireland, the home country of his parents. In September 2010, he set a new Irish Junior record during a track meeting in Apeldoorn, 1:07.9 over 1000 metres. At the 2010 UEC European Track Championships, English surprisingly defeated Sir Chris Hoy in the first round of the sprint event.

In 2012, English won the fourth stage of the Irish Sea Tour of the North. Twice he started at UCI Road World Championships. In 2012, he became Irish National Criterium Champion. In the same year he started to ride for the UCI Continental Team Rapha Condor-JLT and also for the Irish national Team.

In 2013, English established himself as one of the leading criterium riders in the UK - taking victories in the British Elite Circuit Series and The Milk Race.

In 2014, English showed his potential on the world stage taking 2nd in the first round of the Mitchelton Bay Criteriums and winning the overall sprinters jersey. He then went on to the heavily contested Jayco Herald Sun Tour where he took 4th place in the opening prologue - picking up the young rider leaders jersey - and taking 3rd place in the bunch sprint on stage 3.

In November 2015 he was announced as a member of the Madison Genesis squad for 2016.

== Major results ==
2010
1st Stage 3 Isle of Man International Junior Tour
1st Mountains classification Irish International Junior Tour

1st Prologue
1st Stage 6

2011
2nd National U23 Time Trial Championship
3rd Imperial Winter Series Hillingdon
7th National Time Trial Championship
2012
1st National Criterium Championship
1st Stage 4 Sea Tour of the North
4th National U23 Time Trial Championship
5th Eddie Soens Memorial
2013
1st The Milk Race
1st British Cycling Elite Circuit Series Otley
3rd British Cycling Elite Circuit Series Colne
3rd East Yorkshire Classic Roadrace
3rd Overall British Elite Circuit Series, Great Britain
4th Pearl Izumi Tour Series Kirkcaldy
5th British Elite Circuit Series Sheffield
7th Boucles d'Artois Time Trial
2014
1st Pearl Izumi Tour Series TTT Stoke
1st Pearl Izumi Tour Series Aberystwyth
1st Pearl Izumi Tour Series Overall
2nd Geelong Bay Crits Round 1
2nd Pearl Izumi Tour Series Redditch
2nd Jupiter London Nocturne
5th Eddie Soens Memorial
5th The Milk Race
5th Pearl Izumi Tour Series Peterborough
8th Pearl Izumi Tour Series Barrow
9th Pearl Izumi Tour Series Canary Wharf
10th Pearl Izumi Tour Series Stoke
2015
1st Beverley Grand Prix
3rd Colne Grand Prix
7th Otley Grand Prix
2017
UCI Track World Cup

1st Madison (with Mark Downey) – Los Angeles

2019
UCI Track World Cup

1st Scratch race – Glasgow
