= List of European records in track cycling =

European records in the sport of track cycling are the all-time best marks set by racing for a member nation of the Union Européenne de Cyclisme (UEC). UEC doesn't maintain an official list for such performances. All bests shown on this list are tracked by statisticians not officially sanctioned by the governing body.

== Men ==
Event	Record	Athlete	Nationality	Date	Meet	Place	Ref
Flying 200 m time trial	8.857	Matthew Richardson	Great Britain	15 August 2025		Konya, Turkey	
Flying 200 m time trial (sea level)	9.088 WB	Harrie Lavreysen	Netherlands	7 August 2024	Olympic Games	Saint-Quentin-en-Yvelines, France	
250 m time trial (standing start)	16.984 WB	René Enders	Germany	5 December 2013	World Cup	Aguascalientes, Mexico	
250 m time trial (standing start) (sea level)	17.005	Ryan Owens	Great Britain	1 November 2019	World Cup	Minsk, Belarus	
Flying 500 m time trial	24.564	Jeffrey Hoogland	Netherlands	31 October 2023		Aguascalientes, Mexico	
Team sprint	40.949 WR	Jeffrey Hoogland; Harrie Lavreysen; Roy van den Berg	Netherlands	6 August 2024	Olympic Games	Saint-Quentin-en-Yvelines, France	
1 km time trial	55.433 WR	Jeffrey Hoogland	Netherlands	31 October 2023		Aguascalientes, Mexico	
1 km time trial (sea level)	57.321 WB	Harrie Lavreysen	Netherlands	18 October 2024	World Championships	Ballerup, Denmark	
1 km madison time trial	53.553	Ed Clancy; Jon Mould	Great Britain	6 January 2018	Revolution Series	Manchester, United Kingdom	
3000m individual pursuit	3:00.529+	Jonathan Milan	Italy	18 October 2024	World Championships	Ballerup, Denmark	
4000m individual pursuit	3:58.850 WR	Jonathan Milan	Italy	16 October 2026	World Championships	Shanghai, China	
4000m team pursuit	3:39.977 WR	Lasse Norman Leth; Frederik Rodenberg; Rasmus Pedersen; Tobias Hansen	Denmark	2 February 2026	European Championships	Konya, Turkey	
Hour record	56.792 km	Filippo Ganna	Italy	8 October 2022		Grenchen, Switzerland	
Hour record (sea level)	56.792 km	Filippo Ganna	Italy	8 October 2022		Grenchen, Switzerland	
Hour record (UCI best human effort)	56.792 km	Filippo Ganna	Italy	8 October 2022		Grenchen, Switzerland	

== Women ==
Event	Record	Athlete	Nationality	Date	Meet	Place	Ref
Flying 200 m time trial	9.759 WR	Emma Finucane	Great Britain	2 February 2026	European Championships	Konya, Turkey	
250 m time trial (standing start)	18.420	Daria Shmeleva	Russia	17 February 2017	World Cup	Cali, Colombia	
Flying 500 m time trial	27.450	Yana Burlakova	Russia	21 October 2023	Russian Championships	Moscow, Russia	
500 m time trial	32.668	Emma Hinze	Germany	13 August 2022	European Championships	Munich, Germany	
500 m time trial (sea level)	32.668 WB	Emma Hinze	Germany	13 August 2022	European Championships	Munich, Germany	
Team sprint (500 m)	31.905	Lea Friedrich; Emma Hinze	Germany	2 August 2021	Olympic Games	Izu, Japan	
Team sprint (750 m)	45.186 WR	Katy Marchant; Emma Finucane; Sophie Capewell	Great Britain	5 August 2024	Olympic Games	Saint-Quentin-en-Yvelines, France	
Flying 1 km time trial	1:05.232	Erika Salumäe	Soviet Union	27 May 1987		Moscow, Russia	
1 km time trial	1:03.121 WR	Hetty van de Wouw	Netherlands	25 October 2025	World Championships	Santiago, Chile	
2000m individual pursuit	2:11.132+	Lisa Brennauer	Germany	29 February 2020	World Championships	Berlin, Germany	
3000m individual pursuit	3:16.560	Anna Morris	Great Britain	19 October 2024	World Championships	Ballerup, Denmark	
4000m individual pursuit	4:19.461 WR	Josie Knight	Great Britain	4 February 2026	European Championships	Konya, Turkey	
3000m team pursuit*	3:14.051 WR	Dani King; Joanna Rowsell; Laura Trott	Great Britain	4 August 2012	Olympic Games	London, Great Britain	
4000m team pursuit	4:02.808 WR	Katie Archibald; Josie Knight; Anna Morris; Millie Couzens	Great Britain	2 February 2026	European Championships	Konya, Turkey	
Hour record	50.455 km WR	Vittoria Bussi	Italy	10 May 2025		Aguascalientes, Mexico	
Hour record (sea level)	49.254 km	Ellen van Dijk	Netherlands	23 May 2022		Grenchen, Switzerland	
Hour record (UCI best human effort)	48.159 km	Jeannie Longo-Ciprelli	France	26 October 1996		Mexico City, Mexico	

* In 2013, the 3000m team pursuit, 3 rider format was replaced by the UCI with a 4000m team pursuit, 4 person format.
