= List of Danish records in track cycling =

The following are the national records in track cycling in Denmark by Denmarks's national cycling federation: Danish Cycling Federation (DCU).

== Men ==
Key to tables: Awaiting ratification Record not kept by DCU Not ratified or later rescinded by the DCU

Event	Record	Athlete	Date	Meet	Place	Ref
Flying 200m time trial	10.105	William Rimkratt-Milkowski	30 May 2018	Grand Prix of Moscow	Moscow, Russia	
Flying 500m time trial	26.151	Joachim Ritter	13 October 2021		Aguascalientes, Mexico	
1km time trial	1:00.234	Rasmus Pedersen	15 August 2022	European Championships	Munich, Germany	
4000m individual pursuit	4:04.858	Carl-Frederik Bévort	18 October 2024	World Championships	Ballerup, Denmark	
4000m individual pursuit	4:01.365	Robin Juel Skivild	3 February 2026	European Championships	Konya, Turkey	
4000m individual pursuit	3:59.979	Frederik Madsen	16 October 2026	World Championships	Shanghai, China	
4000m team pursuit	3:42.198	Lasse Norman Hansen; Niklas Larsen; Frederik Rodenberg; Rasmus Pedersen	4 August 2021	Olympic Games	Izu, Japan	
4000m team pursuit	3:39.977 WR	Lasse Norman Leth; Frederik Rodenberg; Rasmus Pedersen; Tobias Hansen	2 February 2026	European Championships	Konya, Turkey	
Hour record	53.975 km	Martin Toft Madsen	13 August 2019		Odense, Denmark	

== Women ==
Event	Record	Athlete	Date	Meet	Place	Ref
Flying 200m time trial	12.024	Janni Bormann	6 August 2025		Colorado Springs, United States	
Flying 200m time trial (sea level)	12.030	Janni Bormann	18 October 2019	World Masters Championships	Manchester, United Kingdom	
Flying 500m time trial	32.692	Mie Bekker Lacota	25 February 2005		Ballerup, Denmark	
500m time trial	36.621	Amalie Dideriksen	18 October 2015	European Championships	Grenchen, Switzerlanf	
3000m individual pursuit	3:26.121	Alberte Greve	19 October 2024	World Championships	Ballerup, Denmark	
4000m individual pursuit	4:54.000	Ellen Hjøllund Klinge	4 February 2026	European Championships	Konya, Turkey	
4000m team pursuit						
