= 2020 UCI Track Cycling World Championships – Men's individual pursuit =

Men's individual pursuit at the 2020 UCI Track Cycling World Championships
- Venue: Velodrom
- Location: Berlin, Germany
- Dates: 28 February
- Competitors: 18 from 13 nations

Medalists
gold medal	Filippo Ganna	Italy
silver medal	Ashton Lambie	United States
bronze medal	Corentin Ermenault	France

The Men's individual pursuit competition at the 2020 UCI Track Cycling World Championships was held on 28 February 2020.

== Results ==
=== Qualifying ===
The qualifying was started at 15:48. The first two racers raced for gold, the third and fourth fastest rider raced for the bronze medal.

Rank	Name	Nation	Time	Behind	Notes
1	Filippo Ganna	Italy	4:01.934		Q, WR
2	Ashton Lambie	United States	4:03.640	+1.706	Q
3	Corentin Ermenault	France	4:07.593	+5.659	q
4	Jonathan Milan	Italy	4:08.094	+6.160	q
5	Felix Groß	Germany	4:08.928	+6.994	
6	Stefan Bissegger	Switzerland	4:09.711	+7.777	
7	Claudio Imhof	Switzerland	4:10.302	+8.368	
8	Ivo Oliveira	Portugal	4:10.829	+8.895	
9	Domenic Weinstein	Germany	4:12.571	+10.637	
10	Davide Plebani	Italy	4:13.402	+11.468	
11	Alexander Evtushenko	Russia	4:15.728	+13.794	
12	Jay Lamoureux	Canada	4:17.065	+15.131	
13	Lucas Plapp	Australia	4:18.520	+16.586	
14	Thomas Denis	France	4:18.989	+17.055	
15	Mikhail Shemetau	Belarus	4:19.344	+17.410	
16	Wojciech Ziółkowski	Poland	4:21.462	+19.528	
17	Alisher Zhumakan	Kazakhstan	4:24.911	+22.977	
18	Vitālijs Korņilovs	Latvia	4:45.578	+43.644	
	Lev Gonov	Russia	Did not start		

=== Finals ===
The finals were started at 20:36.

Rank	Name	Nation	Time	Behind
Gold medal race
1st place, gold medalist(s)	Filippo Ganna	Italy	4:03.875	
2nd place, silver medalist(s)	Ashton Lambie	United States	4:08.048	+4.163
Bronze medal race
3rd place, bronze medalist(s)	Corentin Ermenault	France	4:09.921	
4	Jonathan Milan	Italy	4:13.167	+3.146
