= List of Ukrainian records in track cycling =

The following are the national records in track cycling in Ukraine maintained by the Ukrainian Cycling Federation (FCU).

== Men ==
Event	Record	Athlete	Date	Meet	Place	Ref
Flying 200 m time trial	9.530	Bohdan Danylchuk	16 March 2025	Nations Cup	Konya, Turkey	
250m time trial (standing start)	18.165	Volodymyr Buchynyskyy	19 October 2017	European Championships	Berlin, Germany	
1 km time trial						
1 km time trial (sea level)	1:02.935	Andriy Kutsenko	21 October 2017	European Championships	Berlin, Germany	
Team sprint	44.487	Volodymyr Buchynyskyy; Andriy Vynokurov; Andriy Kutsenko	19 October 2017	European Championships	Berlin, Germany	
4000m individual pursuit	4:19.313	Vladyslav Holiak	3 February 2026	European Championships	Konya, Turkey	
4000m team pursuit	4:03.908	Volodymyr Dzhus; Roman Gladysh; Vitaliy Hryniv; Maksym Vasilyev	5 October 2021	European Championships	Grenchen, Switzerland	

== Women ==
Event	Record	Athlete	Date	Meet	Place	Ref
Flying 200 m time trial	10.461	Olena Starikova	6 August 2021	Olympic Games	Izu, Japan	
250 m time trial (standing start)	18.758	Liubov Basova	10 December 2017	World Cup	Santiago, Chile	
500 m time trial	33.210	Olena Starikova	2 December 2018	World Cup	Berlin, Germany	
500 m time trial (sea level)	33.210	Olena Starikova	2 December 2018	World Cup	Berlin, Germany	
1 km time trial	1:07.207	Alla Biletska	4 February 2026	European Championships	Konya, Turkey	
Team sprint (500 m)	32.512	Liubov Basova; Olena Starikova	10 December 2017	World Cup	Santiago, Chile	
Team sprint (750 m)	48.307	Oleksandra Lohviniuk; Alla Biletska; Viktoriia Polishchuk	1 February 2026	European Championships	Konya, Turkey	
3000m individual pursuit	3:32.755	Hanna Solovey	6 December 2013	World Cup	Aguascalientes, Mexico	
4000m individual pursuit	4:53.357	Milana Ushakova	4 February 2026	European Championships	Konya, Turkey	
3000m team pursuit						
4000m team pursuit	4:31.242	Oksana Kliachina; Valeriya Kononenko; Anna Nahirna; Ganna Solovei	9 December 2017	World Cup	Santiago, Chile	
