= 2022 UCI Track Cycling World Championships – Men's individual pursuit =

Men's individual pursuit at the 2022 UCI Track Cycling World Championships
- Venue: Vélodrome National
- Location: Saint-Quentin-en-Yvelines, France
- Dates: 14 October
- Competitors: 25 from 17 nations
- Winning time: 3:59.636

Medalists
gold medal	Filippo Ganna	Italy
silver medal	Jonathan Milan	Italy
bronze medal	Ivo Oliveira	Portugal

The Men's individual pursuit competition at the 2022 UCI Track Cycling World Championships was held on 14 October 2022.

== Results ==
=== Qualifying ===
The qualifying was started at 15:23. The two fasters riders raced for gold, the third and fourth fastest riders raced for bronze.

Rank	Name	Nation	Time	Behind	Notes
1	Filippo Ganna	Italy	4:00.693		Q
2	Jonathan Milan	Italy	4:03.012	+2.319	Q
3	Daniel Bigham	Great Britain	4:05.181	+4.488	q
4	Ivo Oliveira	Portugal	4:06.704	+6.011	q
5	Simon Vitzthum	Switzerland	4:07.326	+6.633	
6	Tom Sexton	New Zealand	4:08.679	+7.986	
7	Conor Leahy	Australia	4:09.197	+8.504	
8	Corentin Ermenault	France	4:09.607	+8.914	
9	Claudio Imhof	Switzerland	4:09.824	+9.131	
10	Shoi Matsuda	Japan	4:10.521	+9.828	
11	Tobias Buck-Gramcko	Germany	4:11.443	+10.750	
12	Chris Ernst	Canada	4:11.661	+10.968	
13	Carson Mattern	Canada	4:13.196	+12.503	
14	Leon Rohde	Germany	4:14.817	+14.124	
15	Kacper Majewski	Poland	4:14.828	+14.135	
16	Erik Martorell	Spain	4:17.499	+16.806	
17	Zhang Haiao	China	4:18.427	+17.734	
18	Nicolas Heinrich	Germany	4:18.777	+18.084	
19	Brendan Rhim	United States	4:20.165	+19.472	
20	Sean Richardson	Canada	4:21.374	+20.681	
21	Daniel Crista	Romania	4:21.601	+20.908	
22	Anders Johnson	United States	4:21.726	+21.033	
23	Alisher Zhumakan	Kazakhstan	4:25.210	+24.517	
24	Artyom Zakharov	Kazakhstan	4:33.655	+32.962	
25	Aleksey Fomovskiy	Uzbekistan	4:42.690	+41.997	

=== Finals ===
The finals were started at 20:36.

Rank	Name	Nation	Time	Notes
Gold medal race
1st place, gold medalist(s)	Filippo Ganna	Italy	3:59.636	WR
2nd place, silver medalist(s)	Jonathan Milan	Italy	4:03.790	+4.154
Bronze medal race
3rd place, bronze medalist(s)	Ivo Oliveira	Portugal	4:08.738	
4	Daniel Bigham	Great Britain	4:09.956	+1.218
