= 2018 UCI Track Cycling World Championships – Men's individual pursuit =

Men's individual pursuit at the 2018 UCI Track Cycling World Championships
- Venue: Omnisport Apeldoorn
- Location: Apeldoorn, Netherlands
- Dates: 2 March
- Competitors: 21 from 14 nations
- Winning time: 4:13.607

Medalists
gold medal	Filippo Ganna	Italy
silver medal	Ivo Oliveira	Portugal
bronze medal	Alexander Evtushenko	Russia

The Men's individual pursuit competition at the 2018 UCI Track Cycling World Championships was held on 2 March 2018 at the Omnisport Apeldoorn in Apeldoorn, Netherlands.

== Results ==
=== Qualifying ===
The first two racers will race for gold, the third and fourth fastest rider will race for the bronze medal.

Rank	Name	Nation	Time	Behind	Notes
1	Ivo Oliveira	Portugal	4:12.365		Q
2	Filippo Ganna	Italy	4:13.622	+1.257	Q
3	Charlie Tanfield	Great Britain	4:14.025	+1.660	q
4	Alexander Evtushenko	Russia	4:14:742	+2.377	q
5	Felix Groß	Germany	4:15.303	+2.938	
6	Kersten Thiele	Germany	4:17.281	+4.916	
7	Ashton Lambie	United States	4:17.634	+5.235	
8	Mikhail Shemetau	Belarus	4:20.404	+8.039	
9	Daniel Bigham	Great Britain	4:20.678	+8.282	
10	Stefan Bissegger	Switzerland	4:21.740	+9.345	
11	Louis Pijourlet	France	4:22.896	+10.505	
12	Dion Beukeboom	Netherlands	4:23.083	+10.718	
13	Nicolas Pietrula	Czech Republic	4:24.414	+12.049	
14	Derek Gee	Canada	4:26.150	+13.754	
15	Michele Scartezzini	Italy	4:26.156	+13.767	
16	Dawid Czubak	Poland	4:26.634	+14.241	
17	Marco Coledan	Italy	4:27.434	+15.069	
18	Florian Maitre	France	4:28.675	+16.284	
19	Bartosz Rudyk	Poland	4:30.379	+18.014	
20	Ivan Smirnov	Russia	4:31.144	+18.779	
21	Ryo Chikatani	Japan	4:32.340	+19.975	

=== Finals ===
The finals were started at 20:11.

Rank	Name	Nation	Time	Behind
Gold medal race
1st place, gold medalist(s)	Filippo Ganna	Italy	4:13.607	
2nd place, silver medalist(s)	Ivo Oliveira	Portugal	4:15.428	+1.821
Bronze medal race
3rd place, bronze medalist(s)	Alexander Evtushenko	Russia	4:13.786	
4	Charlie Tanfield	Great Britain	4:15.930	+2.144
