= 2023 UEC European Track Championships – Men's individual pursuit =

Sporting event

Men's individual pursuit at the 2023 UEC European Track Championships
- Venue: Tissot Velodrome, Grenchen
- Date: 10 February
- Competitors: 24 from 16 nations
- Winning time: 4:03.744

Medalists
gold medal	Jonathan Milan	Italy
silver medal	Daniel Bigham	Great Britain
bronze medal	Tobias Buck-Gramcko	Germany

The men's individual pursuit competition at the 2023 UEC European Track Championships was held on 10 February 2023.

== Results ==
=== Qualifying ===
The first two racers raced for gold, the third and fourth fastest rider raced for the bronze medal.

Rank	Name	Nation	Time	Behind	Notes
1	Daniel Bigham	Great Britain	4:02.775		QG
2	Jonathan Milan	Italy	4:05.266	+2.491	QG
3	Tobias Buck-Gramcko	Germany	4:08.802	+6.027	QB
4	Corentin Ermenault	France	4:09.248	+6.473	QB
5	Charlie Tanfield	Great Britain	4:10.317	+7.542	
6	Nicolas Heinrich	Germany	4:11.201	+8.426	
7	Manlio Moro	Italy	4:12.023	+9.248	
8	Noah Vandenbranden	Belgium	4:12.112	+9.337	
9	Claudio Imhof	Switzerland	4:13.347	+10.572	
10	Theodor Storm	Denmark	4:13.961	+11.186	
11	Brian Megens	Netherlands	4:14.086	+11.311	
12	Bartosz Rudyk	Poland	4:14.831	+12.056	
13	Kacper Majewski	Poland	4:15.403	+12.628	
14	Noah Bögli	Switzerland	4:16.207	+13.432	
15	Rodrigo Caixas	Portugal	4:16.823	+14.048	
16	Brem Deman	Belgium	4:18.242	+15.467	
17	Erik Martorell	Spain	4:18.932	+16.157	
18	Aivaras Mikutis	Lithuania	4:19.732	+16.957	NR
19	Valentyn Kabashnyi	Ukraine	4:21.759	+18.984	
20	Bertold Drijver	Hungary	4:22.509	+19.734	
21	Rokas Adomaitis	Lithuania	4:23.594	+20.819	
22	Joan Martí Bennassar	Spain	4:28.260	+25.485	
23	Daniel Auer	Austria	4:33.192	+30.417	
24	Vitālijs Korņilovs	Latvia	4:35.670	+32.895	

=== Finals ===
Rank	Name	Nation	Time	Behind	Notes
Gold medal final
1st place, gold medalist(s)	Jonathan Milan	Italy	4:03.744		
2nd place, silver medalist(s)	Daniel Bigham	Great Britain	4:05.860	+2.116	
Bronze medal final
3rd place, bronze medalist(s)	Tobias Buck-Gramcko	Germany	4:09.796		
4	Corentin Ermenault	France	4:10.261	+0.465	
