= World record progression track cycling – Men's team sprint =

This is an overview of the progression of the world track cycling record of the men's team sprint as recognised by the Union Cycliste Internationale.

== Progression ==
Time	Cyclist	Location, velodrome	Track	Date	Ref
42.950	United Kingdom; Jamie Staff; Jason Kenny; Chris Hoy	Beijing (CHN)	Indoor track	15 August 2008	
42.914	Germany; René Enders; Maximilian Levy; Stefan Nimke	Cali (COL)	Indoor track	1 December 2011	
42.600	United Kingdom; Philip Hindes; Jason Kenny; Chris Hoy	London (GBR)	Indoor track	2 August 2012	
41.871	Germany; Joachim Eilers; René Enders; Robert Förstemann	Aguascalientes (MEX)	Indoor track	5 December 2013	
41.275	Netherlands; Jeffrey Hoogland; Harrie Lavreysen; Roy van den Berg	Berlin (GER)	Indoor track	26 February 2020	
41.225	Netherlands; Jeffrey Hoogland; Harrie Lavreysen; Roy van den Berg	Berlin (GER)	Indoor track	26 February 2020	
41.191	Netherlands; Roy van den Berg; Harrie Lavreysen; Jeffrey Hoogland	Saint-Quentin-en-Yvelines (FRA)	Indoor track	6 August 2024	
40.949	Netherlands; Roy van den Berg; Harrie Lavreysen; Jeffrey Hoogland	Saint-Quentin-en-Yvelines (FRA)	Indoor track	6 August 2024	
