= 2021 UCI Track Cycling World Championships – Men's individual pursuit =

Men's individual pursuit at the 2021 UCI Track Cycling World Championships
- Venue: Vélodrome Couvert Régional Jean Stablinski
- Location: Roubaix, France
- Dates: 22 October
- Competitors: 22 from 16 nations
- Winning time: 4:05.060

Medalists
| gold medal | Ashton Lambie | United States |
| silver medal | Jonathan Milan | Italy |
| bronze medal | Filippo Ganna | Italy |

The Men's individual pursuit competition at the 2021 UCI Track Cycling World Championships was held on 22 October, 2021.

== Results ==
=== Qualifying ===
The Qualifying was started at 14:37. The two fastest riders will race for gold and the third and fourth fastest riders will race for bronze.

| Rank | Name | Nation | Time | Behind | Notes |
|---|---|---|---|---|---|
| 1 | Ashton Lambie | United States | 4:03.237 | | Q |
| 2 | Jonathan Milan | Italy | 4:05.785 | +2.548 | Q |
| 3 | Filippo Ganna | Italy | 4:06.402 | +3.165 | q |
| 4 | Claudio Imhof | Switzerland | 4:07.609 | +4.372 | q |
| 5 | Tobias Buck-Gramcko | Germany | 4:08.596 | +5.359 | |
| 6 | Nicolas Heinrich | Germany | 4:10.352 | +7.115 | |
| 7 | Manlio Moro | Italy | 4:10.509 | +7.272 | |
| 8 | Charlie Tanfield | Great Britain | 4:13.840 | +10.603 | |
| 9 | Shunsuke Imamura | Japan | 4:14.751 | +11.514 | |
| 10 | Thomas Denis | France | 4:15.333 | +12.096 | |
| 11 | Lev Gonov | Russian Cycling Federation | 4:16.234 | +12.997 | |
| 12 | Ivan Novolodskii | Russian Cycling Federation | 4:17.245 | +14.008 | |
| 13 | Erik Martorell | Spain | 4:20.307 | +17.070 | |
| 14 | Daniel Crista | Romania | 4:20.401 | +17.164 | |
| 15 | João Matias | Portugal | 4:20.497 | +17.260 | |
| 16 | Iúri Leitão | Portugal | 4:22.716 | +19.479 | |
| 17 | Juan Pablo Zapata | Colombia | 4:23.528 | +20.291 | |
| 18 | Julián Osorio | Colombia | 4:25.546 | +22.309 | |
| 19 | Aliaksei Shmantsar | Belarus | 4:26.337 | +23.100 | |
| 20 | Volodymyr Dzhus | Ukraine | 4:29.493 | +26.256 | |
| 21 | Tomás Aguirre | Mexico | 4:39.500 | +36.263 | |
| 22 | Lotfi Tchambaz | Algeria | 4:40.105 | +36.868 | |

=== Finals ===
The finals were started at 20:36.

| Rank | Name | Nation | Time | Behind |
|---|---|---|---|---|
Gold medal race
| 1st place, gold medalist(s) | Ashton Lambie | United States | 4:05.060 | |
| 2nd place, silver medalist(s) | Jonathan Milan | Italy | 4:06.149 | +1.089 |
Bronze medal race
| 3rd place, bronze medalist(s) | Filippo Ganna | Italy | | |
| 4 | Claudio Imhof | Switzerland | OVL | |
