= List of world records in track cycling =

World records in the sport of track cycling are ratified by the Union Cycliste Internationale (UCI). Item 3.5.001 of the UCI regulations defines the events in which world records are recognized.

== Men ==
=== Records recognized by the UCI ===
Key to tables: Awaiting ratification Not ratified or later rescinded by UCI

Event	Record	Athlete	Nationality	Date	Meet	Place	Ref
Flying 200 m time trial (progression)	8.857	Matthew Richardson	Great Britain	15 August 2025		Konya, Turkey	
Flying 500 m time trial (progression)	24.564	Jeffrey Hoogland	Netherlands	31 October 2023		Aguascalientes, Mexico	
Team sprint (Note: Recognised on 250m tracks only.) (progression)	40.949	Jeffrey Hoogland; Harrie Lavreysen; Roy van den Berg	Netherlands	6 August 2024	Olympic Games	Saint-Quentin-en-Yvelines, France	
1 km time trial (progression)	55.433	Jeffrey Hoogland	Netherlands	31 October 2023		Aguascalientes, Mexico	
4000 m individual pursuit (progression)	3:59.153	Jonathan Milan	Italy	18 October 2024	World Championships	Ballerup, Denmark	
4000 m individual pursuit (progression)	3:58.850	Jonathan Milan	Italy	16 October 2026	World Championships	Shanghai, China	
4000 m team pursuit (progression)	3:39.977	Lasse Norman Leth; Frederik Rodenberg; Rasmus Pedersen; Tobias Hansen	Denmark	2 February 2026	European Championships	Konya, Turkey	
Hour record (progression)	56.792 km	Filippo Ganna	Italy	8 October 2022		Grenchen, Switzerland	

=== World bests ===
Event	Record	Athlete	Nationality	Date	Meet	Place	Ref
Flying 200m time trial (sea level)	9.088	Harrie Lavreysen	Netherlands	7 August 2024	Olympic Games	Saint-Quentin-en-Yvelines, France	
250 m time trial (standing start)	16.886	Leigh Hoffman	Australia	6 August 2024	Olympic Games	Saint-Quentin-en-Yvelines, France	
1 km time trial (sea level)	57.321	Harrie Lavreysen	Netherlands	18 October 2024	World Championships	Ballerup, Denmark	
1 km time trial tandem (sea level)	58.038	Neil Fachie; Matt Rotherham	Great Britain	28 August 2021	Paralympic Games	Izu, Japan	
1 km madison time trial	53.553	Ed Clancy; Jon Mould	Great Britain	6 January 2018	Revolution Series	Manchester, United Kingdom	
Team sprint (sea level)	40.949	Jeffrey Hoogland; Harrie Lavreysen; Roy van den Berg	Netherlands	6 August 2024	Olympic Games	Saint-Quentin-en-Yvelines, France	
4000 m individual pursuit (sea level)	3:58.850	Jonathan Milan	Italy	16 October 2026	World Championships	Shanghai, China	
Hour record (sea level)	56.792 km	Filippo Ganna	Italy	8 October 2022		Grenchen, Switzerland	
Hour record (UCI best human effort) (Note: Left dormant when the unified hour record was established in 2014.)	56.792 km	Filippo Ganna	Italy	8 October 2022		Grenchen, Switzerland	

== Women ==
=== Records recognized by the UCI ===
Event	Record	Athlete	Nationality	Date	Meet	Place	Ref
Flying 200m time trial (progression)	9.759	Emma Finucane	Great Britain	2 February 2026	European Championship	Konya, Turkey	
Flying 500m time trial (progression)	27.063	Emma Hinze	Germany	17 August 2024		Berlin, Germany	
1 km time trial	1:02.857	Yuan Liying	China	26 July 2026	Chinese Championships	Zigong, China	
Team sprint (750 m) (progression)	45.186	Katy Marchant; Emma Finucane; Sophie Capewell	Great Britain	5 August 2024	Olympic Games	Saint-Quentin-en-Yvelines, France	
Team sprint (500 m) (Note: After the 2020 Olympic Games, the 2 rider format was replaced by a 3 rider format.) (progression)	31.804	Bao Shanju; Zhong Tianshi	China	2 August 2021	Olympic Games	Izu, Japan	
4000 m individual pursuit (progression)	4:19.461	Josie Knight	Great Britain	4 February 2026	European Championships	Konya, Turkey	
4000m team pursuit (progression)	4:02.808	Katie Archibald; Josie Knight; Anna Morris; Millie Couzens	Great Britain	2 February 2026	European Championships	Konya, Turkey	
Hour record (progression)	50.455 km	Vittoria Bussi	Italy	10 May 2025		Aguascalientes, Mexico	

=== World bests ===
Event	Record	Athlete	Nationality	Date	Meet	Place	Ref
Flying 200m time trial (sea level)	10.029	Lea Friedrich	Germany	9 August 2024	Olympic Games	Saint-Quentin-en-Yvelines, France	
250 m time trial (standing start)	18.247	Bao Shanju	China	2 August 2021	Olympic Games	Shizuoka, Japan	
500 m time trial	32.268	Jessica Salazar	Mexico	7 October 2016	Pan American Championships	Aguascalientes, Mexico	
500 m time trial (sea level)	32.668	Emma Hinze	Germany	13 August 2022	European Championships	Munich, Germany	
3000m individual pursuit	3:15.663	Chloé Dygert	United States	19 October 2024	World Championships	Ballerup, Denmark	
3000m team pursuit (Note: After the 2013 World Championships, the 3000m / 3 rider format was replaced by a 4000m / 4 rider format. A number of performances in the new format have posted faster intermediate times at the 3000 m mark, up to 3:05.356 min at the 2020 Olympic finals.) (progression)	3:14.051	Dani King; Laura Trott; Joanna Rowsell	Great Britain	4 August 2012	Olympic Games	London, United Kingdom	
Hour record (sea level)	49.254 km	Ellen van Dijk	Netherlands	23 May 2022		Grenchen, Switzerland	

== See also ==
- Cycling records
