= 2022 European Road Championships – Men's time trial =

Men's elite time trial
2022 European Road Championships
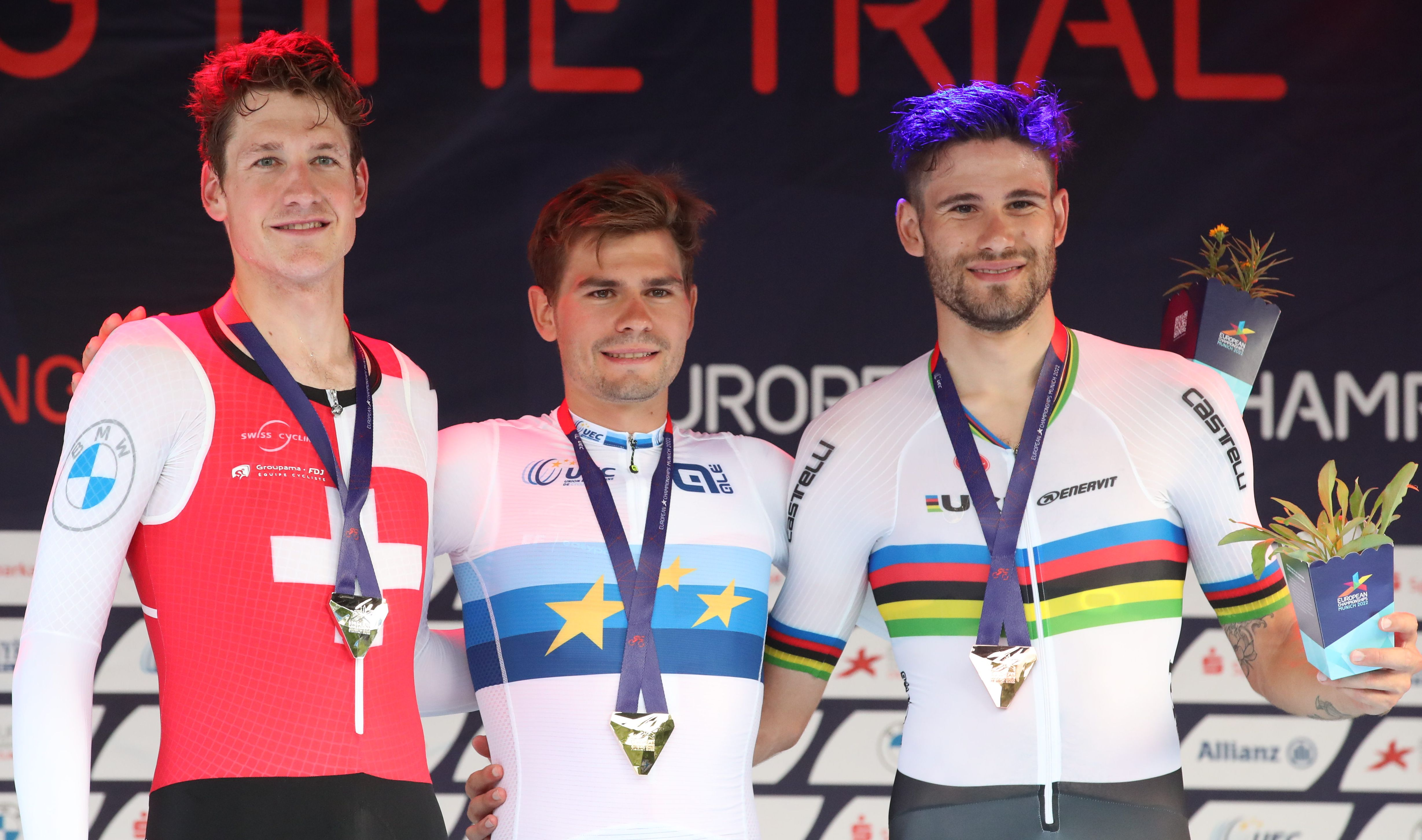

Race details
- Dates: 17 August 2022
- Stages: 1
- Distance: 24.0 km (14.91 mi)

Medalists
	Gold	Stefan Bissegger (SUI)
	Silver	Stefan Küng (SUI)
	Bronze	Filippo Ganna (ITA)

The men's elite time trial at the 2022 European Road Championships took place on 17 August 2022, in Munich, Germany. Nations are allowed to enter a maximum of 2 riders into the event.

== Results ==
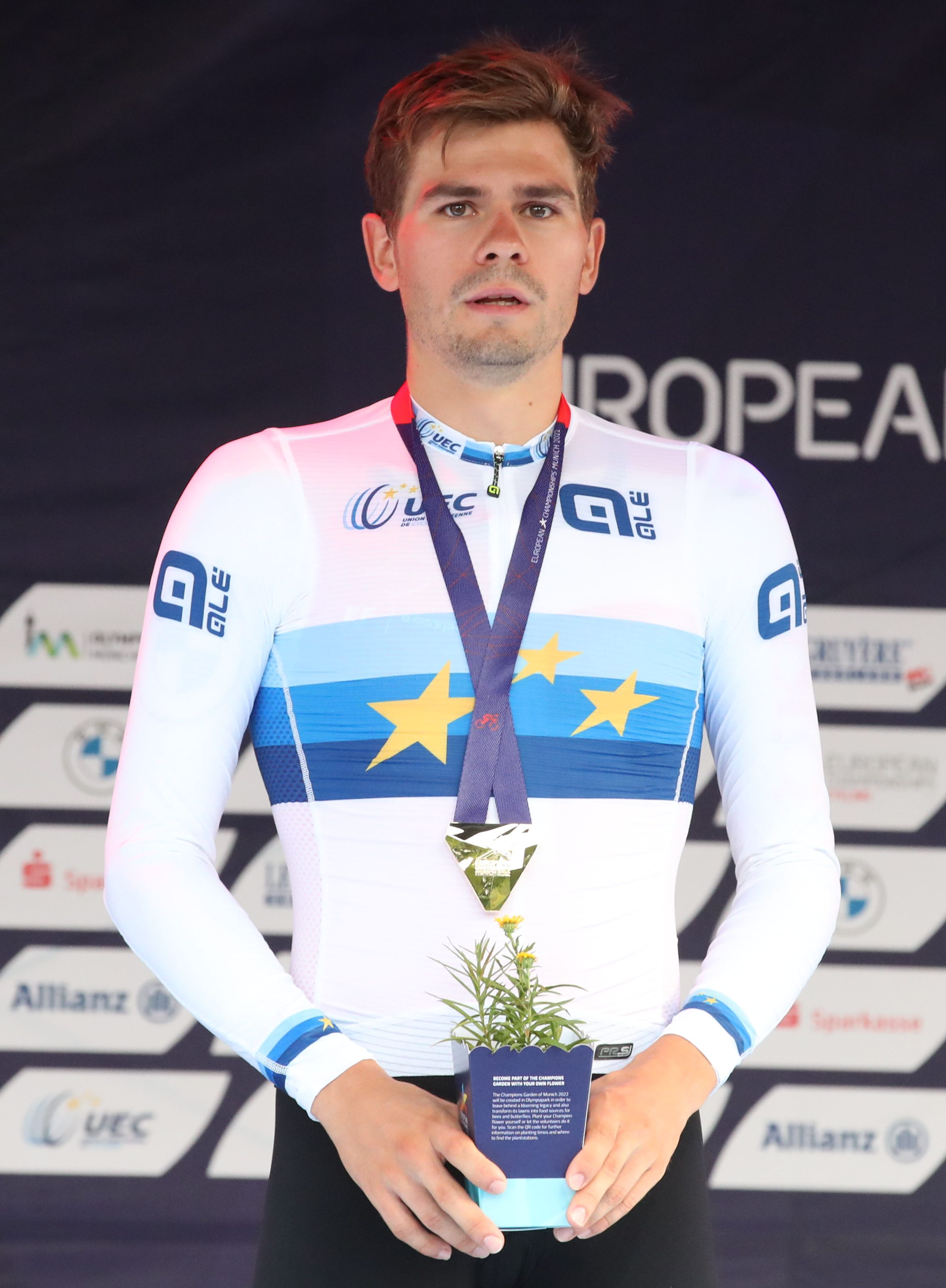
Stefan Bissegger

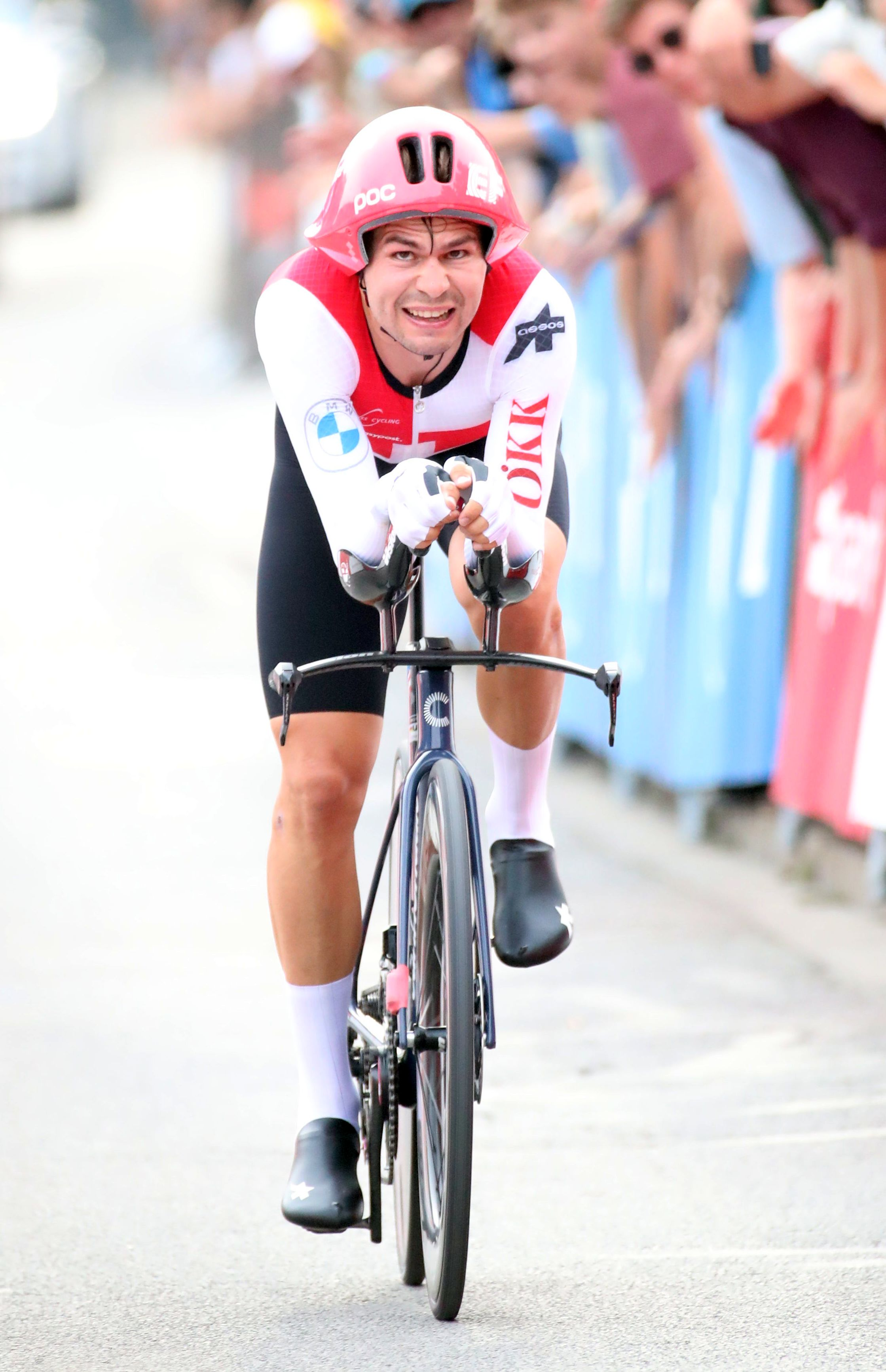
Stefan Küng

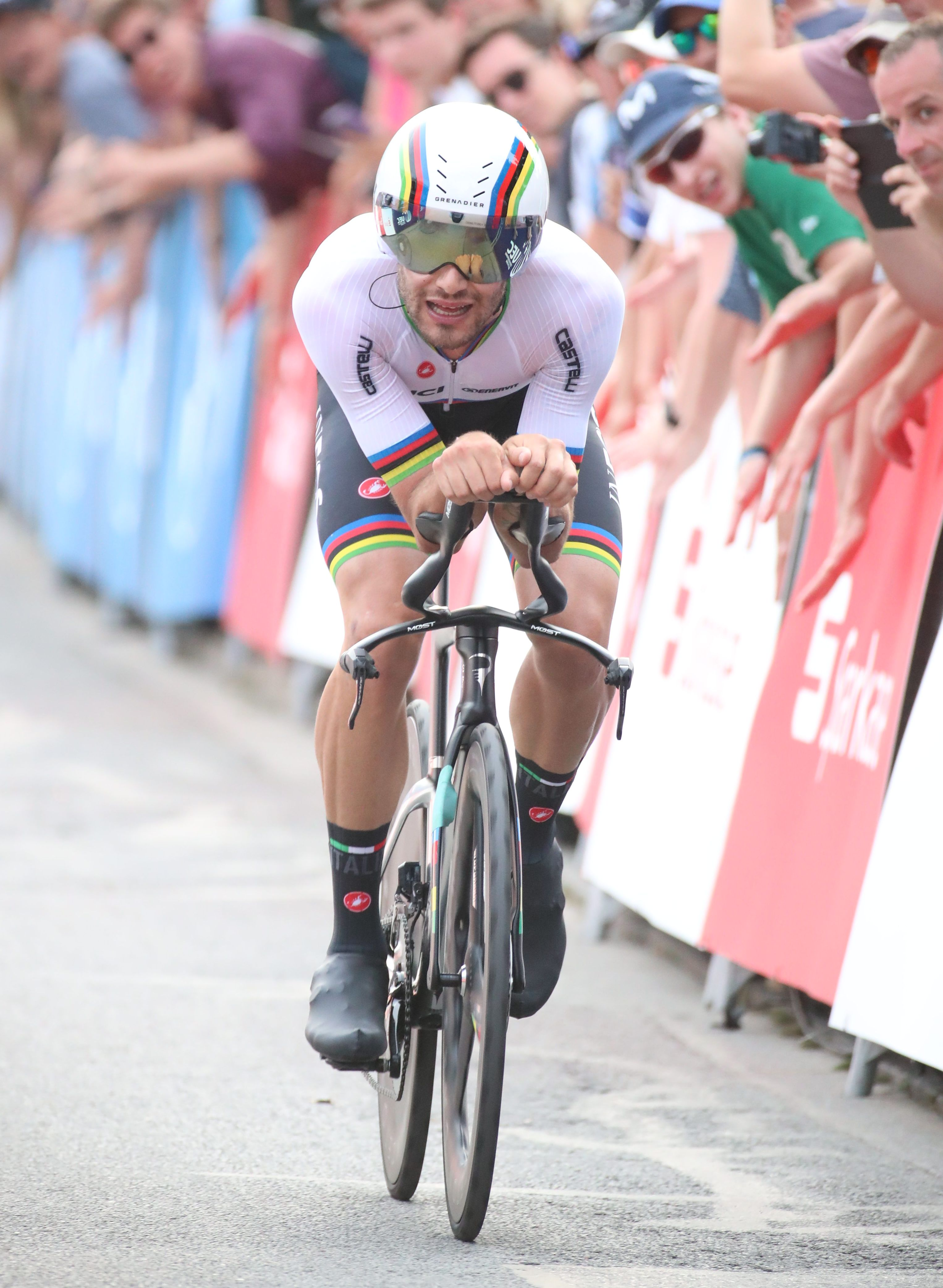
Filippo Ganna

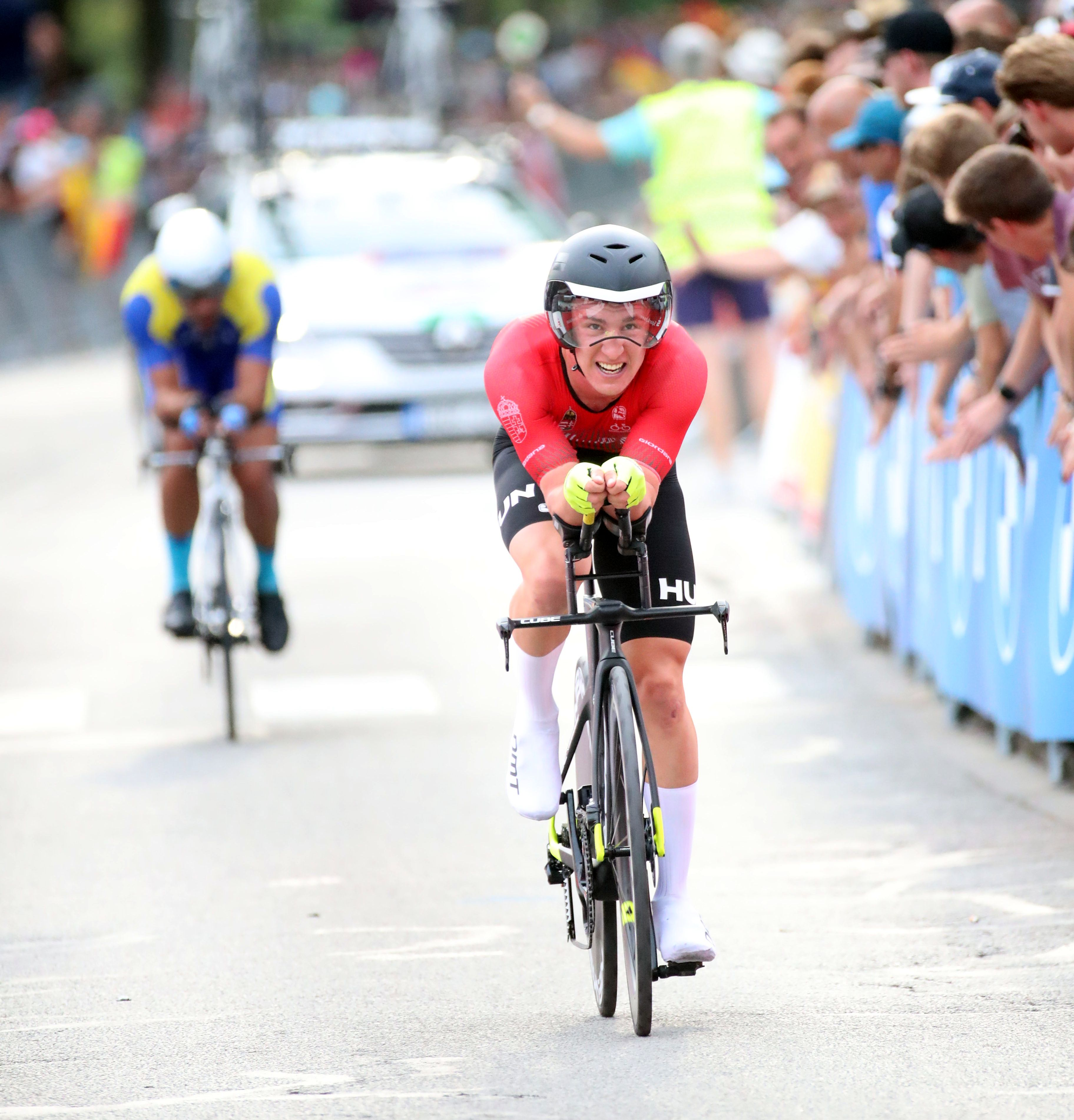
Mikkel Bjerg

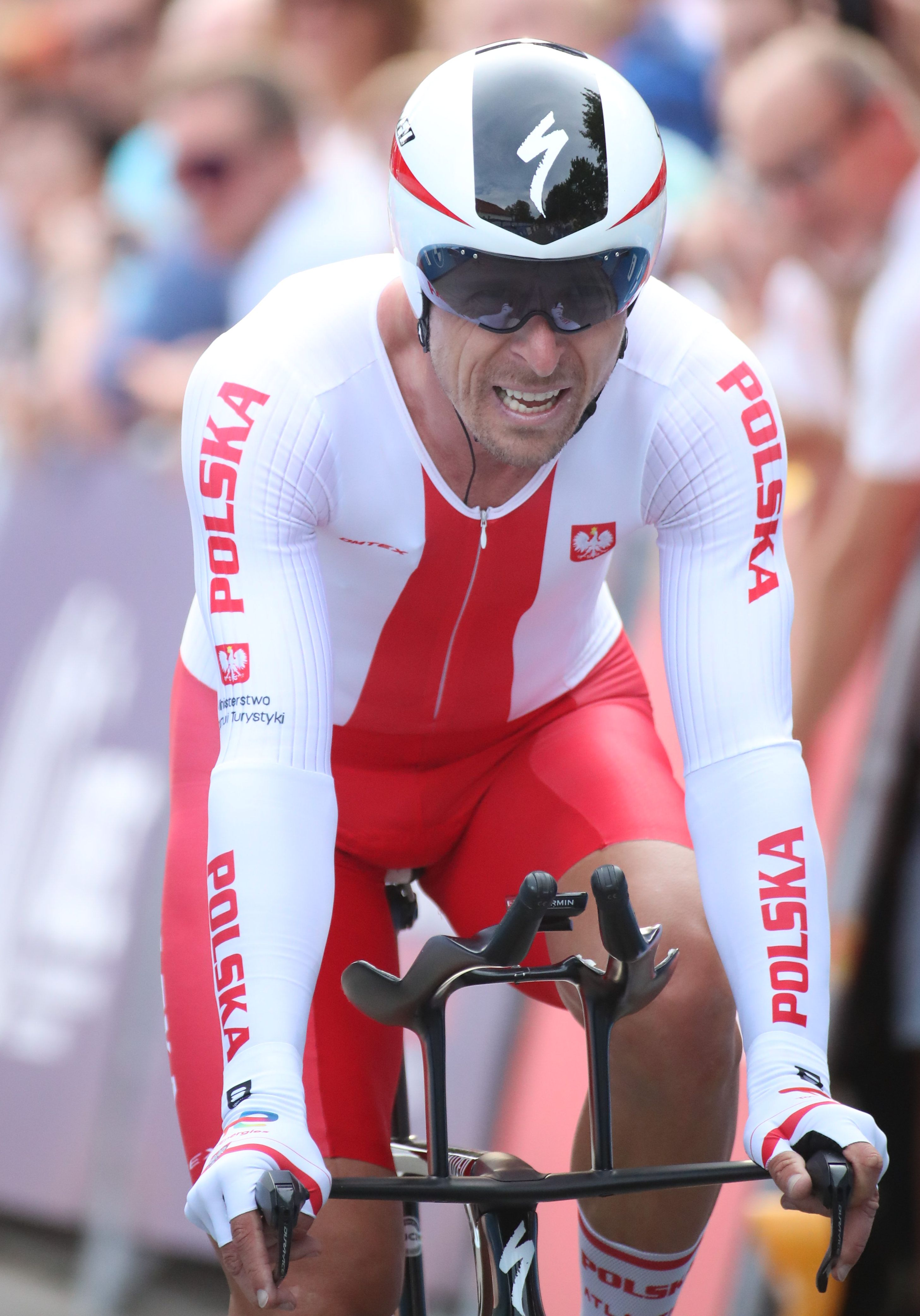
Maciej Bodnar

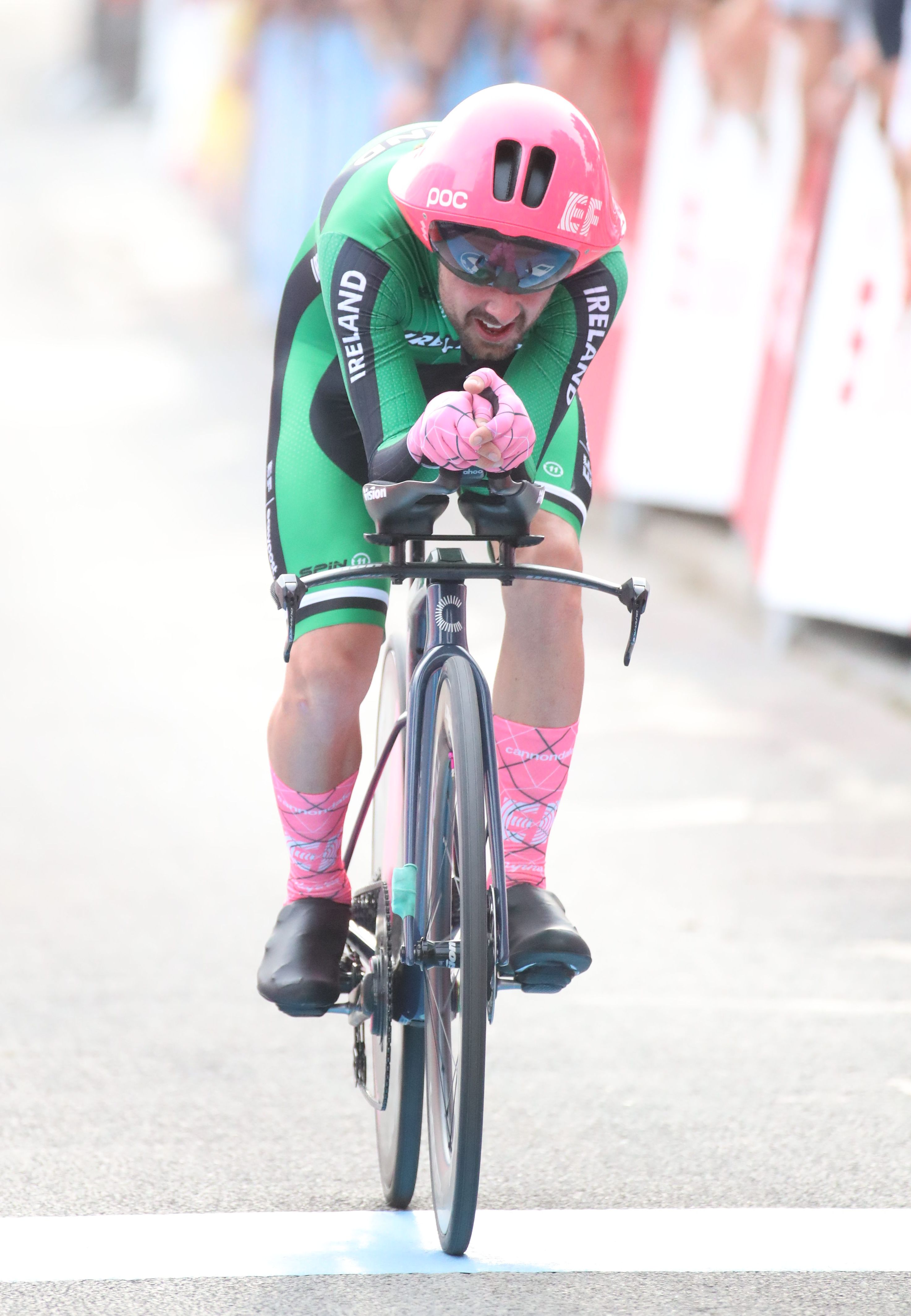
Ben Healy

Rank	#	Cyclist	Nation	Time	Diff.
1st place, gold medalist(s)	11	Stefan Bissegger	Switzerland	27:05.96	
2nd place, silver medalist(s)	2	Stefan Küng	Switzerland	27:06.49	+00:00.53
3rd place, bronze medalist(s)	1	Filippo Ganna	Italy	27:14.00	+00:08.04
4	9	Mikkel Bjerg	Denmark	27:32.63	+00:26.67
5	4	Maciej Bodnar	Poland	27:42.81	+00:36.85
6	16	Ben Healy	Ireland	28:01.56	+00:55.60
7	21	Kévin Vauquelin	France	28:17.61	+01:11.65
8	22	Morten Hulgaard	Denmark	28:18.47	+01:12.51
9	5	Jos van Emden	Netherlands	28:27.19	+01:21.23
10	13	Tanel Kangert	Estonia	28:31.33	+01:25.37
11	12	Jacob Ahlsson	Sweden	28:39.53	+01:33.57
12	6	Rune Herregodts	Belgium	28:43.08	+01:37.12
13	8	Jan Tratnik	Slovenia	28:46.02	+01:40.06
14	24	Mattia Cattaneo	Italy	28:47.04	+01:41.08
15	29	Oier Lazkano	Spain	28:50.44	+01:44.48
16	17	Miguel Heidemann	Germany	28:51.42	+01:45.46
17	23	Rainer Kepplinger	Austria	28:51.79	+01:45.83
18	7	Jan Bárta	Czech Republic	28:57.34	+01:51.38
19	15	Barnabás Peák	Hungary	28:59.24	+01:53.28
20	20	Filip Maciejuk	Poland	28:59.43	+01:53.47
21	10	Anthony Roux	France	29:11.42	+02:05.46
22	25	Jakub Otruba	Czech Republic	29:12.34	+02:06.38
23	31	Ognjen Ilić	Serbia	29:13.33	+02:07.37
24	27	Evaldas Šiškevičius	Lithuania	29:22.99	+02:17.03
25	3	Maximilian Walscheid	Germany	29:47.17	+02:41.21
26	14	Daniel Crista	Romania	30:10.90	+03:04.94
27	32	Serghei Tvetcov	Romania	30:14.33	+03:08.37
28	30	Matic Žumer	Slovenia	30:21.15	+03:15.19
29	26	Márton Dina	Hungary	30:29.01	+03:23.05
30	18	Ingvar Ómarsson	Iceland	31:12.19	+04:06.23
31	34	Stepan Grigoryan	Armenia	31:12.51	+04:06.55
32	28	Andrej Petrovski	North Macedonia	32:15.35	+05:09.39
33	35	Slobodan Milonjić	Montenegro	33:56.59	+06:50.63
34	33	Blerton Nuha	Kosovo	34:56.74	+07:50.78
35	19	Alban Delija	Kosovo	34:59.32	+07:53.36
