= 2023 UCI Track Cycling World Championships – Men's individual pursuit =

Men's individual pursuit at the 2023 UCI Track Cycling World Championships
- Venue: Sir Chris Hoy Velodrome
- Location: Glasgow, United Kingdom
- Dates: 6 August
- Competitors: 27 from 17 nations
- Winning time: 4:01.976

Medalists
gold medal	Filippo Ganna	Italy
silver medal	Daniel Bigham	Great Britain
bronze medal	Jonathan Milan	Italy

The Men's individual pursuit competition at the 2023 UCI Track Cycling World Championships was held on 6 August 2023.

== Results ==
=== Qualifying ===
The qualifying was started at 10:22. The two fastest riders raced for gold, the third and fourth fastest riders raced for bronze.

Rank	Name	Nation	Time	Behind	Notes
1	Filippo Ganna	Italy	4:01.344		Q
2	Daniel Bigham	Great Britain	4:02.961	+1.617	Q
3	Jonathan Milan	Italy	4:06.393	+5.049	q
4	Ivo Oliveira	Portugal	4:06.407	+5.063	q
5	Tobias Buck-Gramcko	Germany	4:07.626	+6.282	
6	Conor Leahy	Australia	4:08.593	+7.249	
7	Oliver Bleddyn	Australia	4:09.606	+8.262	
8	Felix Groß	Germany	4:09.800	+8.456	
9	Chris Ernst	Canada	4:10.281	+8.937	
10	Manlio Moro	Italy	4:10.460	+9.116	
11	Thomas Sexton	New Zealand	4:11.793	+10.449	
12	Corentin Ermenault	France	4:12.341	+10.997	
13	Claudio Imhof	Switzerland	4:13.157	+11.813	
14	Kacper Majewski	Poland	4:13.544	+12.200	
15	Kazushige Kuboki	Japan	4:13.708	+12.364	
16	Niccolò Galli	Italy	4:14.830	+13.486	
17	Michael Foley	Canada	4:15.609	+14.265	
18	Carson Mattern	Canada	4:17.896	+16.552	
19	Zhang Haiao	China	4:17.897	+16.553	
20	Juan Esteban Arango	Colombia	4:21.752	+20.408	
21	Joan Bennassar	Spain	4:21.951	+20.607	
22	Shoi Matsuda	Japan	4:21.963	+20.619	
23	Ramis Dinmukhametov	Kazakhstan	4:28.720	+27.376	
24	Vitālijs Korņilovs	Latvia	4:31.444	+30.100	
25	Lotfi Tchambaz	Algeria	4:34.561	+33.217	
26	Qiu Zhentao	China	4:36.644	+35.300	
27	Valère Thiébaud	Switzerland	4:46.943	+45.599	

=== Finals ===
The finals were started at 19:01.

Rank	Name	Nation	Time	Behind
Gold medal race
1st place, gold medalist(s)	Filippo Ganna	Italy	4:01.976	
2nd place, silver medalist(s)	Daniel Bigham	Great Britain	4:02.030	+0.054
Bronze medal race
3rd place, bronze medalist(s)	Jonathan Milan	Italy	4:05.868	
4	Ivo Oliveira	Portugal	4:08.469	+2.601
