= 2021 European Road Championships – Men's elite time trial =

Men's elite time trial
2021 European Road Championships

Race details
- Dates: 9 September 2021
- Stages: 1
- Distance: 22.4 km (13.92 mi)

Medalists
| | Gold | Stefan Küng (SUI) |
| | Silver | Filippo Ganna (ITA) |
| | Bronze | Remco Evenepoel (BEL) |

The men's elite time trial at the 2021 European Road Championships will take place on 9 September 2021, in Trentino, Italy. Nations are allowed to enter a maximum of 2 riders into the event.

== Results ==
| Rank | # | Cyclist | Nation | Time | Diff. |
|---|---|---|---|---|---|
| 1st place, gold medalist(s) | 39 | Stefan Küng | Switzerland | 24:29.85 | |
| 2nd place, silver medalist(s) | 36 | Filippo Ganna | Italy | 24:37.55 | +00:07.70 |
| 3rd place, bronze medalist(s) | 37 | Remco Evenepoel | Belgium | 24:44.41 | +00:14.56 |
| 4 | 13 | Stefan Bissegger | Switzerland | 24:52.97 | +00:23.11 |
| 5 | 34 | Max Walscheid | Germany | 25:07.92 | +00:38.07 |
| 6 | 10 | Edoardo Affini | Italy | 25:08.23 | +00:38.38 |
| 7 | 3 | Kasper Asgreen | Denmark | 25:21.06 | +00:51.21 |
| 8 | 26 | Maciej Bodnar | Poland | 25:33.86 | +01:04.01 |
| 9 | 38 | Rémi Cavagna | France | 25:35.54 | +01:05.69 |
| 10 | 31 | João Almeida | Portugal | 25:46.07 | +01:16.22 |
| 11 | 21 | Jos van Emden | Netherlands | 25:46.92 | +01:17.07 |
| 12 | 35 | Tadej Pogačar | Slovenia | 25:50.96 | +01:21.11 |
| 13 | 11 | Rune Herregodts | Belgium | 25:59.24 | +01:29.39 |
| 14 | 7 | Rafael Reis | Portugal | 26:03.19 | +01:33.34 |
| 15 | 12 | Bruno Armirail | France | 26:04.29 | +01:34.44 |
| 16 | 9 | Miguel Heidemann | Germany | 26:07.60 | +01:37.75 |
| 17 | 32 | Jan Bárta | Czech Republic | 26:20.32 | +01:50.47 |
| 18 | 33 | Ryan Mullen | Ireland | 26:39.36 | +02:09.50 |
| 19 | 30 | Artem Nych | Russia | 26:39.59 | +02:09.74 |
| 20 | 20 | Felix Ritzinger | Austria | 26:41.99 | +02:12.14 |
| 21 | 23 | Mikkel Bjerg | Denmark | 26:43.08 | +02:13.23 |
| 22 | 14 | Ognjen Ilić | Serbia | 26:46.51 | +02:16.66 |
| 23 | 22 | Barnabás Peák | Hungary | 26:47.35 | +02:17.50 |
| 24 | 1 | Julius van den Berg | Netherlands | 26:50.47 | +02:20.62 |
| 25 | 28 | Andreas Miltiadis | Cyprus | 26:59.88 | +02:30.03 |
| 26 | 6 | Artem Ovechkin | Russia | 27:03.52 | +02:33.67 |
| 27 | 27 | Mykhaylo Kononenko | Ukraine | 27:04.83 | +02:34.98 |
| 28 | 2 | János Pelikán | Hungary | 27:06.87 | +02:37.02 |
| 29 | 8 | Conn McDunphy | Ireland | 27:11.55 | +02:41.70 |
| 30 | 16 | Omer Goldstein | Israel | 27:11.57 | +02:41.72 |
| 31 | 4 | Oleksandr Golovash | Ukraine | 27:20.51 | +02:50.66 |
| 32 | 18 | Ukko Peltonen | Finland | 27:23.81 | +02:53.96 |
| 33 | 24 | Andrej Petrovski | North Macedonia | 27:38.14 | +03:08.29 |
| 34 | 15 | Michel Ries | Luxembourg | 27:38.73 | +03:08.88 |
| 35 | 19 | Spas Gyurov | Bulgaria | 28:01.51 | +03:31.66 |
| 36 | 5 | Venantas Lašinis | Lithuania | 28:31.16 | +04:01.31 |
| 37 | 17 | Ingvar Ómarsson | Iceland | 28:33.07 | +04:03.22 |
| 38 | 25 | Ronald Kuba | Slovakia | 28:44.58 | +04:14.73 |
| 39 | 29 | Evaldas Šiškevičius | Lithuania | 29:33.30 | +05:03.45 |
