= 2024 UCI Track Cycling World Championships – Men's individual pursuit =

Men's individual pursuit at the 2024 UCI Track Cycling World Championships
- Venue: Ballerup Super Arena
- Location: Ballerup, Denmark
- Dates: 18 October
- Competitors: 21 from 13 nations
- Winning time: 3:59.153

Medalists
gold medal	Jonathan Milan	Italy
silver medal	Josh Charlton	Great Britain
bronze medal	Daniel Bigham	Great Britain

The Men's individual pursuit competition at the 2024 UCI Track Cycling World Championships was held on 18 October 2024.

== Results ==
=== Qualifying ===
The qualifying was started at 14:45. The two fasters riders raced for gold, the third and fourth fastest riders raced for bronze.

Rank	Name	Nation	Time	Behind	Notes
1	Josh Charlton	Great Britain	3:59.304		Q, WR
2	Jonathan Milan	Italy	4:00.296	+0.992	Q
3	Daniel Bigham	Great Britain	4:01.671	+2.367	q
4	Charlie Tanfield	Great Britain	4:04.040	+4.736	q
5	Noah Vandenbranden	Belgium	4:04.470	+5.166	
6	Ivo Oliveira	Portugal	4:04.532	+5.228	
7	Carl-Frederik Bévort	Denmark	4:04.858	+5.554	
8	Anders Johnson	United States	4:08.623	+9.319	
9	Valere Thiebaud	Switzerland	4:09.277	+9.973	
10	Manlio Moro	Italy	4:09.406	+10.102	
11	Alex Vogel	Switzerland	4:13.018	+13.714	
12	Brendan Rhim	United States	4:13.169	+13.865	
13	Kacper Majewski	Poland	4:13.914	+14.610	
14	Bruno Keßler	Germany	4:14.021	+14.717	
15	Ben Jochum	Germany	4:14.982	+15.678	
16	Chris Ernst	Canada	4:15.701	+16.397	
17	Sean Richardson	Canada	4:19.193	+19.889	
18	Shoi Matsuda	Japan	4:19.908	+20.604	
19	Mohammad Al-Mutaiwei	United Arab Emirates	4:23.390	+24.086	
20	Ilya Karabutov	Kazakhstan	4:25.927	+26.623	
–	Thibaut Bernard	Belgium	Disqualified		

=== Finals ===
The finals was started at 20:38.

Rank	Name	Nation	Time	Behind
Gold medal race
1st place, gold medalist(s)	Jonathan Milan	Italy	3:59.153 WR	
2nd place, silver medalist(s)	Josh Charlton	Great Britain	4:00.232	+1.079
Bronze medal race
3rd place, bronze medalist(s)	Daniel Bigham	Great Britain	4:03.807	
4	Charlie Tanfield	Great Britain	4:08.499	+4.692
