= UCI World Cups =

The UCI World Cups are the World Cups for cycling disciplines organized by the Union Cycliste Internationale:

- UCI Road World Cup (1989–2004)
- UCI Women's Road World Cup (1998–2015)
- UCI Mountain Bike World Cup
- UCI Track Cycling World Cup (1993–2021)
- UCI Cyclo-cross World Cup
- UCI BMX Racing World Cup
- UCI Trials World Cup
- UCI Cycle-ball World Cup
- UCI Para-cycling Road World Cup
