= Stefan Bissegger =

Swiss cyclist (born 1998)

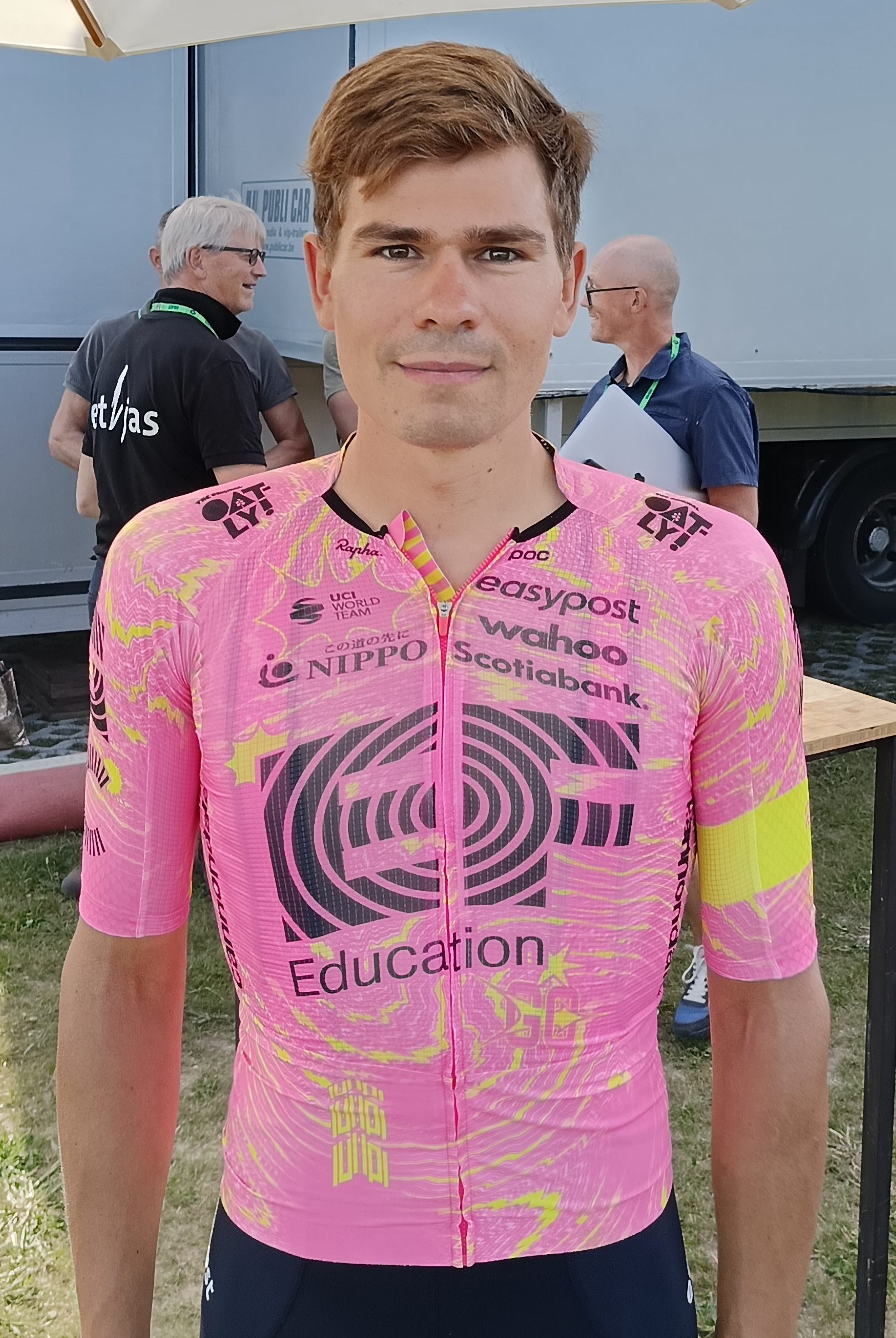
- Bissegger in 2024

Personal information
- Full name: Stefan Bissegger
- Born: 13 September 1998 (age 28) Weinfelden, Switzerland
- Height: 1.81 m (5 ft 11 in)
- Weight: 78 kg (172 lb)

Cycling career
- Sport: Cycling
- Current team: Decathlon CMA CGM Team
- Disciplines: Road; Track
- Role: Rider
- Rider type: Time trialist, Classics specialist

Amateur team
- 2020: VC Bürglen-Märwil

Professional teams
- 2018: Akros–Renfer SA
- 2019: Swiss Racing Academy
- 2020–2024: EF Pro Cycling
- 2025–: Decathlon–AG2R La Mondiale

Major wins
- One-day races and Classics European Time Trial Championships (2022) National Time Trial Championships (2023)
Medal record
Representing Switzerland
Men's road bicycle racing
World Championships
Gold medal – first place	2022 Wollongong	Mixed team relay
Gold medal – first place	2023 Glasgow	Mixed team relay
Silver medal – second place	2019 Yorkshire	Under-23 road race
European Championships
Gold medal – first place	2022 Munich	Time trial
Silver medal – second place	2020 Plouay	Under-23 time trial
Silver medal – second place	2020 Plouay	Mixed team relay
Silver medal – second place	2023 Drenthe	Time trial
Bronze medal – third place	2019 Alkmaar	Under-23 time trial
Men's track cycling
European Championships
Silver medal – second place	2018 Glasgow	Team pursuit

Stefan Bissegger (born 13 September 1998) is a Swiss professional road and track racing cyclist, who currently rides for UCI WorldTeam Decathlon CMA CGM Team. He rode in the men's individual pursuit event at the 2018 UCI Track Cycling World Championships.

== Major results ==
=== Road ===
2016
1st Overall Driedaagse van Axel

1st Stages 2 & 4

2018
1st Time trial, National Under-23 Championships
2019
1st Time trial, National Under-23 Championships
New Zealand Cycle Classic

1st Points classification
1st Stage 2

Tour de l'Avenir

1st Stages 2 (TTT) & 6

1st Stage 1 Tour de l'Ain
1st Stage 2 Tour du Jura
2nd Road race, UCI World Under-23 Championships
2nd Overall Grand Prix Priessnitz spa

1st Points classification
1st Stage 1

UEC European Under-23 Championships

3rd Time trial
7th Road race

4th Eschborn–Frankfurt Under-23
2020
UEC European Championships

2nd Under-23 Time trial
2nd Team relay

3rd Time trial, National Championships
5th Giro della Toscana
7th Overall Orlen Nations Grand Prix
2021
Tour de Suisse

1st Points classification
1st Stage 4

1st Stage 3 (ITT) Paris–Nice
1st Stage 2 (ITT) Benelux Tour
4th Time trial, UEC European Championships
7th Time trial, UCI World Championships
2022
UCI World Championships

1st Team relay
5th Time trial

1st Time trial, UEC European Championships
1st Stage 3 (ITT) UAE Tour
7th Chrono des Nations
2023
1st Team relay, UCI World Championships
1st Time trial, National Championships
2nd Time trial, UEC European Championships
3rd Chrono des Nations
2024
National Championships

2nd Time trial
3rd Road race

6th Time trial, Olympic Games
2025
2nd Time trial, National Championships
6th Paris–Tours
7th Paris–Roubaix
2026
2nd Time trial, National Championships
3rd Team relay, UCI Road World Championships
8th Paris–Roubaix

=== Grand Tour general classification results timeline ===
Grand Tour	2021	2022	2023	2024	2025
Giro d'Italia	—	—	—	—	—
Tour de France	103	83	—	—	DNF
Vuelta a España	—	—	117	—	

Legend
—	Did not compete
DNF	Did not finish

=== Track ===
2015
2nd Team pursuit, UCI World Junior Championships
2016
1st Individual pursuit, UCI World Junior Championships
2017
National Championships

1st Elimination
1st Keirin
1st Points race

2018
National Championships

1st Elimination
1st Kilo
