= World record progression track cycling – Men's individual pursuit =

This is an overview of the progression of the world track cycling record of the men's 4 km individual pursuit as recognised by the Union Cycliste Internationale.

== World record progression ==
=== Amateurs (1964–1992) ===
Time	Cyclist	Location	Track	Date
4:52.000	Luigi Roncaglia (ITA)	Milan (ITA), Vigorelli	Open air	6 June 1964
4:49.730	Radamés Treviño (MEX)	Mexico City (MEX), Centre Sp.	Open air	21 October 1967
4:48.890	Cipriano Chemello (ITA)	Mexico City (MEX), Centre Sp.	Open air	21 October 1967
4:45.940	Jiří Daler (TCH)	Mexico City (MEX), Centre Sp.	Open air	21 October 1967
4:45.250	Jørn Lund (DEN)	Mexico City (MEX), Olympic Velodrome	Open air	30 September 1972
4:59.400	Xaver Kurmann (SUI)	Zürich (SUI), Hallenstadion	Indoor	3 December 1972
4:53.520	Roy Schuiten (NED)	Zürich (SUI), Hallenstadion	Indoor	3 December 1972
4:53.180	Orfeo Pizzoferrato (ITA)	Milan (ITA), Palais Des Sports	Indoor	9 July 1976
4:49.639	Hans-Henrik Ørsted (DEN)	Copenhagen (DEN), Forum	Indoor	31 January 1978
4:47.219	Orfeo Pizzoferrato (ITA)	Milan (ITA), Palais Des Sports	Indoor	5 August 1978
4:43.890	Robert Dill-Bundi (SUI)	Zürich (SUI), Hallenstadion	Indoor	5 July 1979
4:40.230	Hans-Henrik Ørsted (DEN)	Mexico City (MEX), Centre Sp.	Open air	31 October 1979
4:43.423	Alexandre Krasnov (URS)	Moscow (URS)	Indoor	23 May 1980
4:39.960	Harald Wolf (RDA)	Moscow (URS)	Indoor	22 July 1980
4:37.687	Victor Koupovets (URS)	Moscow (URS)	Indoor	26 July 1983
4:37.824	Gintautas Umaras (URS)	Medellín (COL), Martin Cochise Rodriguez	Open air	14 September 1985
4:34.103	Gintautas Umaras (URS)	Moscow (URS)	Indoor	6 February 1986
4:37.614	Steve Hegg (USA)	Colorado Springs (USA)	Open air	16 August 1986
4:33.307	Viatcheslav Ekimov (URS)	Moscow (URS)	Indoor	13 September 1986
4:28.900	Viatcheslav Ekimov (URS)	Moscow (URS)	Indoor	20 September 1986
4:31.160	Gintautas Umaras (URS)	Seoul (KOR), Olympic Velodrome	Open air	18 September 1987
4:27.357	Chris Boardman (GBR)	Barcelona (ESP), Velodrome Horta	Open air	27 July 1992
4:24.496	Chris Boardman (GBR)	Barcelona (ESP), Velodrome Horta	Open air	28 July 1992

=== Open (from 1993) ===
Time	Cyclist	Location	Track	Date	Ref
4:23.562	Philippe Ermenault (FRA)	Bordeaux (FRA)	Indoor	30 July 1993	
4:23.283	Philippe Ermenault (FRA)	Hamar (NOR)	Indoor	18 August 1993	
4:22.668	Graeme Obree (GBR)	Hamar (NOR)	Indoor	18 August 1993	
4:20.894	Graeme Obree (GBR)	Hamar (NOR)	Indoor	19 August 1993	
4:19.699	Andrea Collinelli (ITA)	Atlanta (USA)	Open air	24 July 1996	
4:13.353	Chris Boardman (GBR)	Manchester (GBR)	Indoor	28 August 1996	
4:11.114	Chris Boardman (GBR)	Manchester (GBR)	Indoor	29 August 1996	
4:10.534	Jack Bobridge (AUS)	Sydney (AUS)	Indoor	2 February 2011	
4:07.251	Ashton Lambie (USA)	Aguascalientes (MEX)	Indoor	31 August 2018	
4:06.407	Ashton Lambie (USA)	Cochabamba (BOL)	Indoor	6 September 2019	
4:05.423	Ashton Lambie (USA)	Cochabamba (BOL)	Indoor	6 September 2019	
4:04.252	Filippo Ganna (ITA)	Minsk (BLR)	Indoor	3 November 2019	
4:02.647	Filippo Ganna (ITA)	Minsk (BLR)	Indoor	3 November 2019	
4:01.934	Filippo Ganna (ITA)	Berlin (GER)	Indoor	28 February 2020	
3:59.930	Ashton Lambie (USA)	Aguascalientes (MEX)	Indoor	18 August 2021	
3:59.636	Filippo Ganna (ITA)	Saint-Quentin-en-Yvelines (FRA)	Indoor	14 October 2022	
3:59.304	Josh Charlton (GBR)	Ballerup (DEN)	Indoor	18 October 2024	
3:59.153	Jonathan Milan (ITA)	Ballerup (DEN)	Indoor	18 October 2024	
3:58.850	Jonathan Milan (ITA)	Shanghai (CHN)	Indoor	16 October 2026	
