= Filippo Ganna =

Italian cyclist (born 1996)

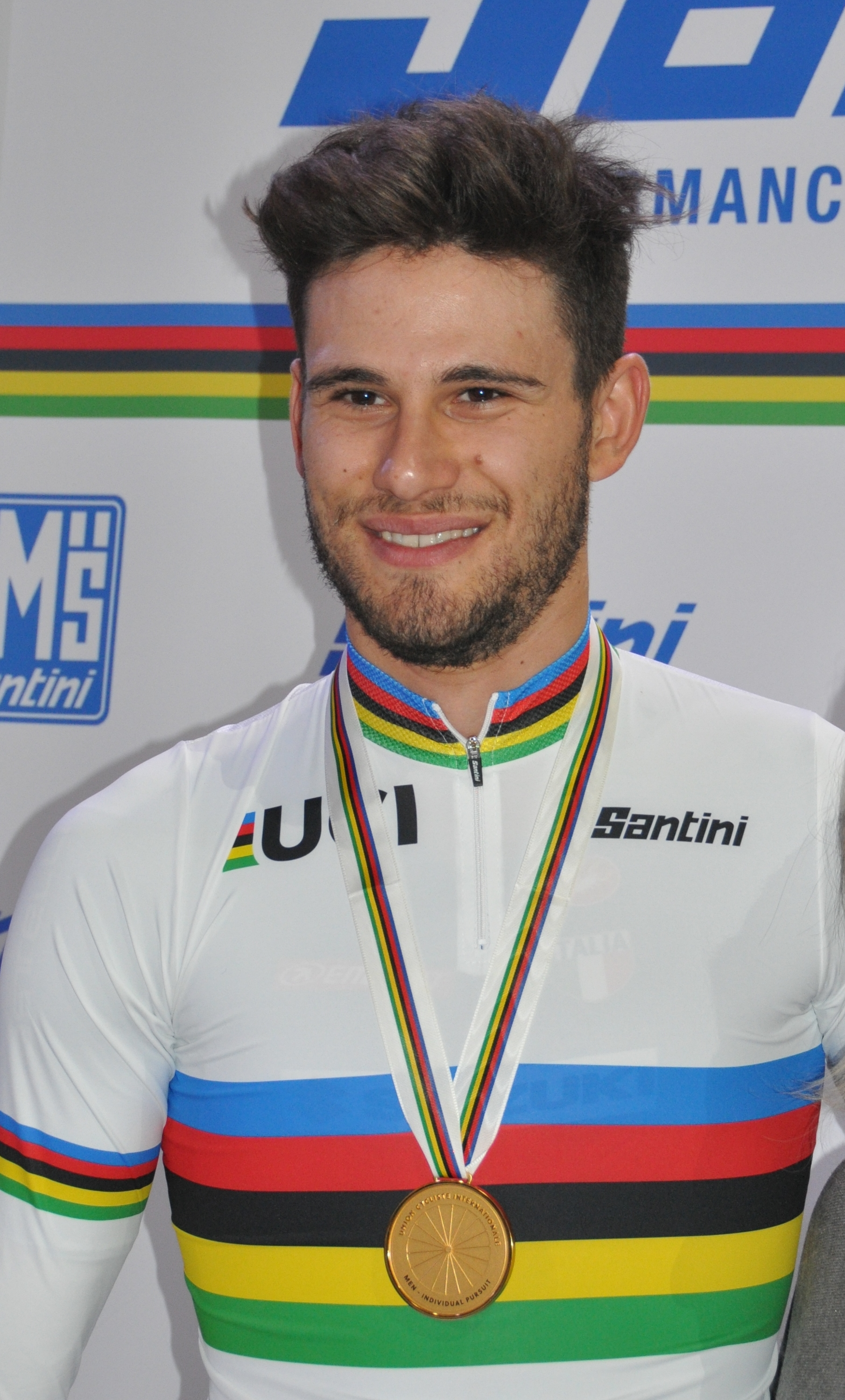
- Ganna at the 2020 UCI Track Cycling World Championships

Personal information
- Full name: Filippo Ganna
- Nickname: Top Ganna
- Born: 25 July 1996 (age 30) Verbania, Italy
- Height: 1.93 m (6 ft 4 in)
- Weight: 82 kg (181 lb)

Cycling career
- Sport: Cycling
- Current team: Netcompany–Ineos
- Disciplines: Road; Track
- Role: Rider
- Rider type: Time trialist (road); Pursuitist (track)

Amateur teams
- 2012: Pedale Ossolano
- 2014: Aspiratori Otelli Castanese Verbania
- 2015: Viris Maserati–Sisal Matchpoint
- 2016: Team Colpack

Professional teams
- 2015: → Lampre–Merida (stagiaire)
- 2017–2018: UAE Abu Dhabi
- 2019–: Team Sky

Major wins
- Road Grand Tours Giro d'Italia 8 individual stages (2020, 2021, 2024, 2026) Vuelta a España 2 individual stages (2023, 2025) Stage races Tour de Wallonie (2023) One-day races and Classics World Time Trial Championships (2020, 2021) National Time Trial Championships (2019, 2020, 2022, 2023, 2024, 2025, 2026) Dwars door Vlaanderen (2026) Track Olympic Games Team pursuit (2021) World Championships Individual pursuit (2016, 2018, 2019, 2020, 2022, 2023) Team pursuit (2021) Hour record 56.792 km (8 October 2022)
Medal record
Representing Italy
Men's track cycling
Olympic Games
Gold medal – first place	2020 Tokyo	Team pursuit
Bronze medal – third place	2024 Paris	Team pursuit
World Championships
Gold medal – first place	2016 London	Individual pursuit
Gold medal – first place	2018 Apeldoorn	Individual pursuit
Gold medal – first place	2019 Pruszków	Individual pursuit
Gold medal – first place	2020 Berlin	Individual pursuit
Gold medal – first place	2021 Roubaix	Team pursuit
Gold medal – first place	2022 Saint-Quentin-en-Yvelines	Individual pursuit
Gold medal – first place	2023 Glasgow	Individual pursuit
Silver medal – second place	2017 Hong Kong	Individual pursuit
Silver medal – second place	2022 Saint-Quentin-en-Yvelines	Team pursuit
Silver medal – second place	2023 Glasgow	Team pursuit
Silver medal – second place	2026 Shanghai	Team pursuit
Bronze medal – third place	2017 Hong Kong	Team pursuit
Bronze medal – third place	2018 Apeldoorn	Team pursuit
Bronze medal – third place	2020 Berlin	Team pursuit
Bronze medal – third place	2021 Roubaix	Individual pursuit
Bronze medal – third place	2026 Shanghai	Individual pursuit
European Championships
Gold medal – first place	2017 Berlin	Individual pursuit
Gold medal – first place	2018 Glasgow	Team pursuit
Gold medal – first place	2023 Grenchen	Team pursuit
Silver medal – second place	2016 Yvelines	Individual pursuit
Silver medal – second place	2016 Yvelines	Team pursuit
Silver medal – second place	2017 Berlin	Team pursuit
Silver medal – second place	2019 Apeldoorn	Team pursuit
Men's road bicycle racing
Olympic Games
Silver medal – second place	2024 Paris	Time trial
World Championships
Gold medal – first place	2020 Imola	Time trial
Gold medal – first place	2021 Flanders	Time trial
Silver medal – second place	2022 Wollongong	Mixed team relay
Silver medal – second place	2023 Stirling	Time trial
Silver medal – second place	2024 Zurich	Time trial
Bronze medal – third place	2019 Yorkshire	Time trial
Bronze medal – third place	2021 Flanders	Mixed team relay
Bronze medal – third place	2024 Zurich	Mixed team relay
European Championships
Gold medal – first place	2021 Trentino	Mixed team relay
Silver medal – second place	2021 Trentino	Time trial
Silver medal – second place	2025 Guilherand-Granges	Time trial
Silver medal – second place	2025 Guilherand-Granges	Mixed team relay
Bronze medal – third place	2022 Munich	Time trial

Filippo Ganna (born 25 July 1996) is an Italian track and road cyclist who currently rides for UCI WorldTeam Netcompany–Ineos. He is a record-breaking six-time world champion in the individual pursuit, winning a total of nine medals at the UCI Track Cycling World Championships, and part of the Olympic gold medal-winning team in the team pursuit at the 2020 Summer Olympics. He also won the men's individual time trial at the 2020 and 2021 UCI Road World Championships, and won eight stages in the Giro d'Italia and two stages in the Vuelta a España, setting the record for most consecutive time trials won at the Giro with five. He was the previous world record holder in individual pursuit and he is the current record holder of the hour record, which he unified with the best human effort since the distinction was first made in 1997.

== Career ==
The son of former Italian Olympic sprint canoer Marco Ganna, Ganna emerged into the scene at the 2016 World Indoor Championships with an uncommon negative splits pursuit style of starting very slowly and falling behind, then winding up the speed in the second half to win. Ganna rode for Italian amateur team Team Colpack, before turning professional with UAE Abu Dhabi in 2017. After two years with the team, he joined Team Sky ahead of the 2019 season.

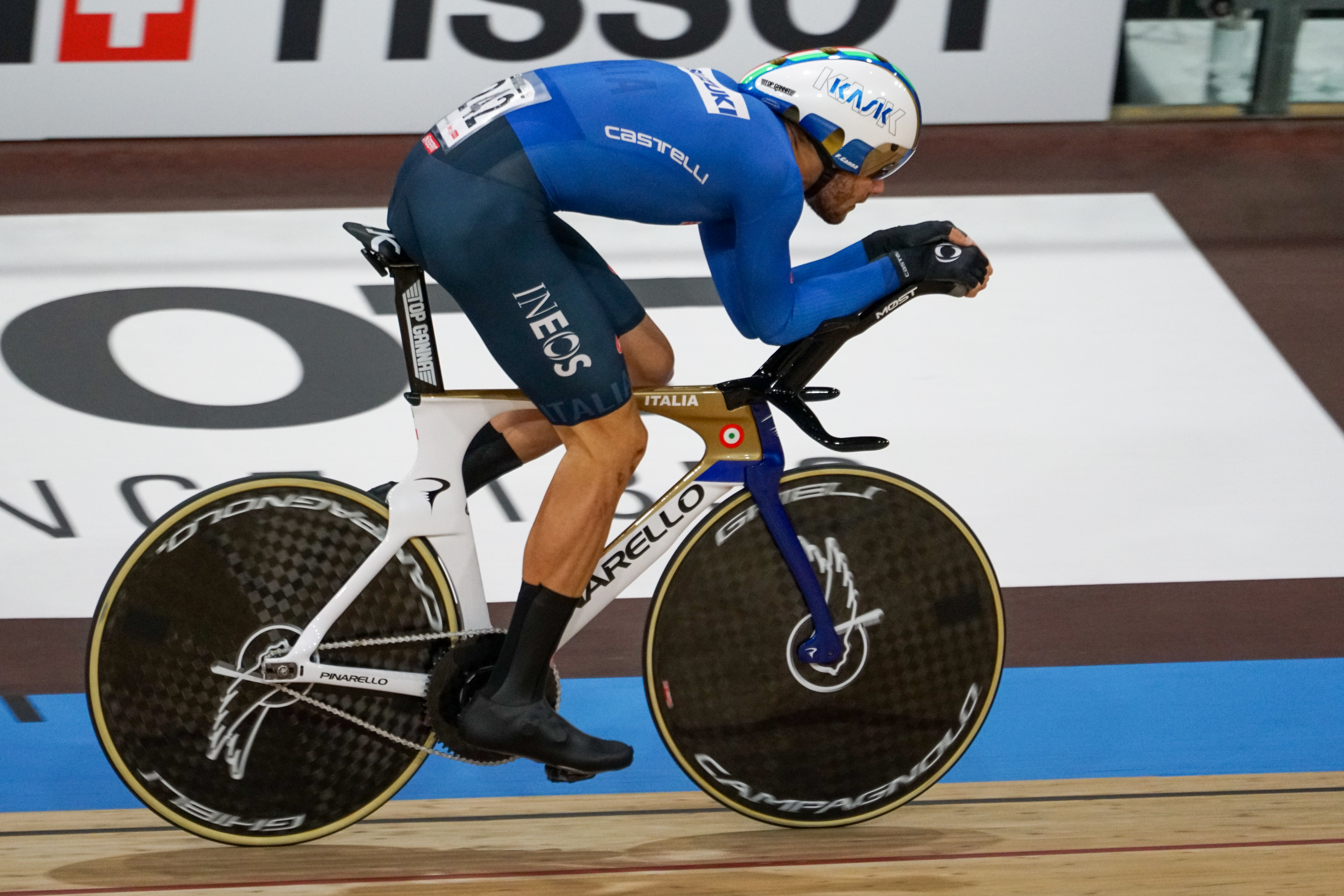
Ganna at the 2020 UCI Track Cycling World Championships

Between November 2019 and February 2020, Ganna set a world record for the individual pursuit on three occasions, lowering the mark from over 4 minutes, 5 seconds to a time of 4 minutes, 1.934 seconds at the 2020 UCI Track Cycling World Championships in Berlin. At the 2020 Summer Olympics held at Tokyo in 2021, together with Simone Consonni, Francesco Lamon and Jonathan Milan, he won the gold medal in the team pursuit. The team set a new world record two times, both in the 3rd battery round against New Zealand and in the final against Denmark, at 3:42.02. Italy had set the new Olympic record in the qualifications, which Denmark had beat in the next race.

On 8 October 2022, Ganna set a new hour record of 56.792 kilometres (35.289 mi) at the Tissot Velodrome in Grenchen, Switzerland, beating the previous record of 55.548 kilometres (34.516 mi) set by Daniel Bigham on 19 August.

On 19 February 2025, Ganna took part in the first stage of the 2025 Volta ao Algarve. Ganna raised his arms to celebrate the win, but due to multiple riders going the wrong way at the finish, the stage was cancelled with no winner declared.

== Major results ==
=== Road ===
2012
1st Time trial, National Cadet Championships
2013
3rd Time trial, National Junior Championships
2014
1st Time trial, National Junior Championships
1st Chrono des Nations Juniors
1st Trofeo Emilio Paganessi
4th Time trial, UCI World Junior Championships
4th Time trial, UEC European Junior Championships
2015
1st Chrono Champenois
2016
1st Time trial, National Under-23 Championships
1st Paris–Roubaix Espoirs
1st GP Laguna
UEC European Under-23 Championships

2nd Time trial
6th Road race

2nd Trofeo Città di San Vendemiano
2017
9th Time trial, UEC European Championships
2018
2nd Time trial, National Championships
2nd Overall Vuelta a San Juan

1st Young rider classification

2019 (3 pro wins)
1st Time trial, National Championships
1st Stage 1 (ITT) Tour de la Provence
1st Stage 6 (ITT) BinckBank Tour
2nd Chrono des Nations
3rd Time trial, UCI World Championships
5th Coppa Sabatini
6th Time trial, UEC European Championships
2020 (7)
1st Time trial, UCI World Championships
1st Time trial, National Championships
Giro d'Italia

1st Stages 1 (ITT), 5, 14 (ITT) & 21 (ITT)
Held & after Stages 1–2
Held after Stage 1
Held after Stages 5–8

1st Stage 8 (ITT) Tirreno–Adriatico
2nd Overall Vuelta a San Juan
2021 (6)
UCI World Championships

1st Time trial
3rd Team relay

UEC European Championships

1st Team relay
2nd Time trial

Giro d'Italia

1st Stages 1 (ITT) & 21 (ITT)
Held & after Stages 1–3
Held after Stage 1

Étoile de Bessèges

1st Stages 4 & 5 (ITT)

1st Stage 2 (ITT) UAE Tour
4th Time trial, National Championships
5th Time trial, Olympic Games
2022 (6)
1st Time trial, National Championships
1st Stage 1 (ITT) Tirreno–Adriatico
1st Stage 4 (ITT) Critérium du Dauphiné
1st Stage 5 (ITT) Étoile de Bessèges
1st Prologue Deutschland Tour
1st Prologue Tour de la Provence
UCI World Championships

2nd Team relay
7th Time trial

3rd Time trial, UEC European Championships
2023 (6)
1st Time trial, National Championships
1st Overall Tour de Wallonie

1st Stages 1 & 4 (ITT)

1st Stage 10 (ITT) Vuelta a España
1st Stage 1 (ITT) Tirreno–Adriatico
2nd Time trial, UCI World Championships
2nd Overall Volta ao Algarve
2nd Overall Vuelta a San Juan
2nd Milan–San Remo
4th Gran Piemonte
6th Paris–Roubaix
10th E3 Saxo Classic
2024 (3)
National Championships

1st Time trial
4th Road race

1st Stage 14 (ITT) Giro d'Italia
1st Stage 4 Tour of Austria
2nd Time trial, Olympic Games
UCI World Championships

2nd Time trial
3rd Team relay

2025 (3)
1st Time trial, National Championships
1st Stage 18 (ITT) Vuelta a España
2nd Time trial, UEC European Championships
2nd Overall Tirreno–Adriatico

1st Stage 1 (ITT)

2nd Milan–San Remo
3rd E3 Saxo Classic
4th Overall Tour of Belgium
8th Tour of Flanders
2026 (5)
1st Time trial, National Championships
UCI Road World Championships

1st Team relay
2nd Time trial

1st Dwars door Vlaanderen
1st Stage 10 (ITT) Giro d'Italia
1st Stage 1 (ITT) Tirreno–Adriatico
1st Stage 3 (ITT) Volta ao Algarve
7th Overall Tour of Britain

1st Points classification

==== Grand Tour general classification results timeline ====
Grand Tour	2017	2018	2019	2020	2021	2022	2023	2024	2025	2026
Giro d'Italia	—	—	—	61	118	—	DNF	101	—	99
Tour de France	—	—	—	—	—	95	—	—	DNF	123
Vuelta a España	—	—	—	—	—	—	104	—	131	—

==== Classics results timeline ====
Monument	2018	2019	2020	2021	2022	2023	2024	2025	2026
Milan–San Remo	161	114	74	64	51	2	40	2	33
Tour of Flanders	DNF	98	—	—	—	—	—	8	—
Paris–Roubaix	OTL	DNF	—	—	35	6	—	13	25
Liège–Bastogne–Liège	Has not contested during his career								
Giro di Lombardia	Has not contested during his career								
Classic	2018	2019	2020	2021	2022	2023	2024	2025	2026
E3 Saxo Bank Classic	—	—	NH	—	—	10	—	3	—
Gent–Wevelgem	43	DNF	—	—	—	DNF	—	—	34
Dwars door Vlaanderen	DNF	—	—	—	—	91	—	—	1
Gran Piemonte	17	OTL	32	116	—	4	DNF	27	

==== Major championships results timeline ====
Event		2017	2018	2019	2020	2021	2022	2023	2024	2025	2026
Olympic Games	Road race	Not held				—	Not held		—	Not held	
Olympic Games	Time trial	Not held				5	Not held		2	Not held	
World Championships	Road race	—	—	—	—	—	—	—	—	—	
World Championships	Time trial	—	—	3	1	1	7	2	2	—	2
European Championships	Road race	DNF	—	—	—	DNF	61	37	—	—	
European Championships	Time trial	9	12	6	—	2	3	—	—	2	
National Championships	Road race	DNF	DNF	38	—	—	—	11	4	56	—
National Championships	Time trial	12	2	1	1	4	1	1	1	1	1

Legend
—	Did not compete
NH	Not Held
DNF	Did not finish
DSQ	Disqualified

=== Track ===
2014
1st Individual pursuit, National Junior Championships
2015
1st Individual pursuit, National Championships
2016
1st Individual pursuit, UCI World Championships
UEC European Under-23 Championships

1st Individual pursuit
2nd Team pursuit

UEC European Championships

2nd Individual pursuit
2nd Team pursuit

2017
UEC European Championships

1st Individual pursuit
2nd Team pursuit

1st Team pursuit, UCI World Cup, Pruszków
UCI World Championships

2nd Individual pursuit
3rd Team pursuit

2018
UCI World Championships

1st Individual pursuit
3rd Team pursuit

1st Team pursuit, UEC European Championships
2019
1st Individual pursuit, UCI World Championships
1st Team pursuit, UCI World Cup, Hong Kong
2nd Team pursuit, UEC European Championships
2020
UCI World Championships

1st Individual pursuit
3rd Team pursuit

2021
1st Team pursuit, Olympic Games
UCI World Championships

1st Team pursuit
3rd Individual pursuit

2022
Hour record: 56.792 km
UCI World Championships

1st Individual pursuit
2nd Team pursuit

2023
UCI World Championships

1st Individual pursuit
2nd Team pursuit

1st Team pursuit, UEC European Championships
2024
3rd Team pursuit, Olympic Games
3rd Team pursuit, UCI Nations Cup, Adelaide
2026
UCI World Championships

2nd Team pursuit
3rd Individual pursuit

==== World records ====
Date	Time	Meet	Event	Location
3 November 2019	4:04.252	UCI Track Cycling World Cup	Individual Pursuit	Minsk, Belarus
3 November 2019	4:02.647	UCI Track Cycling World Cup	Individual Pursuit	Minsk, Belarus
28 February 2020	4:01.934	UCI Track Cycling World Cup	Individual Pursuit	Berlin, Germany
3 August 2021	3:42.307	2020 Olympics	Team Pursuit (with Simone Consonni, Francesco Lamon & Jonathan Milan)	Izu, Japan
4 August 2021	3:42.032	2020 Olympics	Team Pursuit (with Simone Consonni, Francesco Lamon & Jonathan Milan)	Izu, Japan
14 October 2022	3:59.636	UCI Track Cycling World Championships	Individual Pursuit	Saint-Quentin-en-Yvelines, France

== See also ==
- List of world records in track cycling

Preceded by Daniel Bigham	UCI hour record (56.792 km); 8 October 2022 – present	Succeeded by –
