= Daniel Bigham =

British cyclist (born 1991)

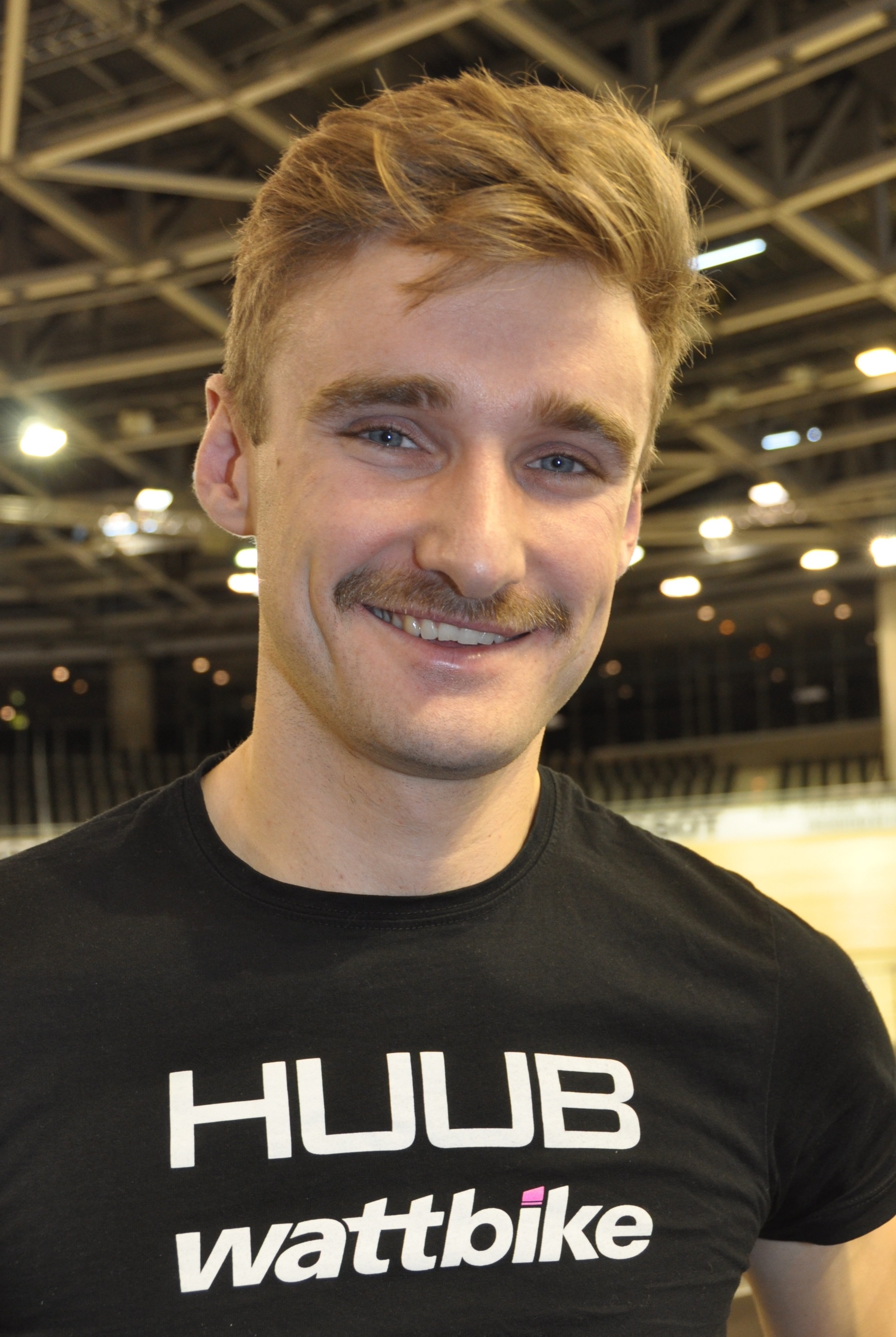
- Bigham in 2018

Personal information
- Full name: Daniel John Bigham
- Born: 2 October 1991 (age 35) Newcastle-under-Lyme, England

Cycling career
- Sport: Cycling
- Disciplines: Track; Road
- Role: Rider
- Rider type: Time trialist (road), Pursuitist (track)

Amateur teams
- 2016: Planet X–Northside
- 2017: Brother DriverPlan NRG
- 2018: Ribble Pro Cycling

Professional team
- 2019–2021: Ribble Pro Cycling

Major wins
- Track World Championships Team pursuit (2022) Hour record 55.548 km (19 August 2022)
Medal record
Representing Great Britain
Men's track cycling
Olympic Games
Silver medal – second place	2024 Paris	Team pursuit
World Championships
Gold medal – first place	2022 Saint-Quentin-en-Yvelines	Team pursuit
Silver medal – second place	2023 Glasgow	Individual pursuit
Bronze medal – third place	2024 Ballerup	Individual pursuit
European Championships
Gold medal – first place	2024 Apeldoorn	Individual pursuit
Gold medal – first place	2024 Apeldoorn	Team pursuit
Silver medal – second place	2023 Grenchen	Individual pursuit
Silver medal – second place	2023 Grenchen	Team pursuit
Men's road bicycle racing
World Championships
Bronze medal – third place	2019 Yorkshire	Team relay
Representing England
Men's track cycling
Commonwealth Games
Silver medal – second place	2022 Birmingham	Team pursuit

Daniel John Bigham (born 2 October 1991) is a British aerodynamics engineer and former racing cyclist, who has predominantly competed successfully in individual and team endurance track events, winning gold medals at national, European and world championships.

== Racing career ==
Bigham won his first national track cycling titles in 2017, in the team pursuit, individual pursuit and kilometre time trial disciplines, also helping Great Britain to UCI World Cup victories in the team pursuit in 2017 and 2018. He won further track medals at the national level in 2019 and 2020, and in 2021 broke the UK men's hour record (see below). Also in 2021 and again in 2022, he took silver on the road in the men's individual time trial. At the 2022 British National Track Championships in Newport, Wales he won another British title, winning the individual pursuit.

Bigham rode for UCI Continental team Ribble Weldtite from 2018 until 2021. He then gained national attention being the figurehead of the Huub-Wattbike trade team. Despite their lack of budget and operating outside the British Cycling set-up, they achieved great success on the track, winning UCI World Cup events and bringing a variety of technical and strategic innovations to the team pursuit, before changes were made to trade team eligibility rules.

Since 2022, he has worked for Ineos Grenadiers as a performance engineer, helping the team's riders improve their aerodynamic performance.

Alongside Charlie Tanfield, Ethan Vernon and Oliver Wood, Bigham won silver in the team pursuit at the 2022 Commonwealth Games. Following success in the team pursuit, Bigham has also competed in the individual pursuit at several international championships, winning silvers at the 2023 UCI Track Cycling World Championships and 2023 UEC European Track Championships, and then a gold at the 2024 UEC Championships, where, with Ethan Hayter, Vernon and Tanfield, he also won a team pursuit gold.

He has regularly raced against his Ineos Grenadiers team-mate Fillipo Ganna, most notably during their hour record attempts and at the 2023 UCI Track World Championships.

In early August, Bigham shared that he would be leaving Ineos Grenadiers once the Olympics were over, having reportedly become disillusioned with the team's setup under new management. In September, it was announced that he would be retiring from competitive cycling to focus on a new role as Head of Engineering at Red Bull–Bora–Hansgrohe.

His last event racing for Great Britain was the 2024 UCI Track Cycling World Championships in October, held in Denmark. He took bronze in the individual pursuit, where he raced against long-time teammate and competitor Charlie Tanfield.

=== Hour record ===
On 1 October 2021, Bigham rode 54.723 km (34.003 mi) at the Tissot Velodrome in Grenchen, Switzerland to break Bradley Wiggins's British national hour record. He was ineligible to attempt the UCI record because he was not enrolled in the UCI's Registered Testing Pool anti-doping system, including a biological passport. While all World Tour riders and ProTeam riders are in the testing pool, Bigham estimated it would cost him £8,000 to join as an individual.

On 19 August 2022, Bigham broke the hour record with a distance of 55.548 km at the Velodrome Suisse in Grenchen. Bigham held the record for just shy of two months; Filippo Ganna registered 56.792 km in October 2022, surpassing Bigham's mark by more than 1 km. Bigham was a central part of the team in Ganna's attempt, using the engineering knowledge he had developed in his own record to aid Ganna.

Ganna and Bigham met in the final of the individual pursuit at the 2023 UCI Track Cycling World Championships, with Ganna edging Bigham for gold by a fraction of a second.

== Personal life ==
Bigham studied motorsport engineering at Oxford Brookes University. Bigham is married to fellow cyclist Joss Lowden, former holder of the women's hour record. In 2023, they welcomed their first child. As of 2024, they reside in Andorra.

== Major results ==
=== Road ===
2016
3rd Beaumont Trophy
2019
3rd Team relay, UCI World Championships
4th Beaumont Trophy
5th Time trial, National Championships
2021
2nd Time trial, National Championships
2022
2nd Time trial, National Championships

=== Track ===
2017
National Championships

1st Individual pursuit
1st Kilo
1st Team pursuit

1st Team pursuit, UCI World Cup, Minsk
2018
1st Team pursuit, UCI World Cup, London
2nd Individual pursuit, National Championships
2019
National Championships

1st Team pursuit
2nd Individual pursuit

2020
National Championships

1st Team pursuit
2nd Kilo
3rd Individual pursuit

2021
British hour record: 54.723 km
2022
Hour record: 55.548 km
1st Team pursuit, UCI World Championships
1st Individual pursuit, National Championships
2nd Team pursuit, Commonwealth Games
2023
1st Team pursuit, UCI Nations Cup, Milton
UEC European Championships

2nd Individual pursuit
2nd Team pursuit

2nd Individual pursuit, UCI World Championships
2024
UEC European Championships

1st Individual pursuit
1st Team pursuit

1st Team pursuit, UCI Nations Cup, Milton
2nd Team pursuit, Olympic Games
3rd Individual pursuit, UCI World Championships

Preceded by Victor Campenaerts	UCI hour record (55.548 km); 19 August 2022 – 8 October 2022	Succeeded by Filippo Ganna
