= 2026 UEC European Track Championships – Women's individual pursuit =

Women's individual pursuit at the 2026 UEC Track Elite European Championships
- Venue: Konya Velodrome, Konya
- Date: 4 February
- Competitors: 20 from 14 nations
- Winning time: 4:22.353

Medalists
gold medal	Josie Knight	Great Britain
silver medal	Federica Venturelli	Italy
bronze medal	Millie Couzens	Great Britain

The women's individual pursuit competition at the 2026 UEC European Track Championships was held on 4 February 2026.

== Results ==
=== Qualifying ===
The first two racers raced for gold, the third and fourth fastest rider raced for the bronze medal.

Rank	Name	Nation	Time	Behind	Notes
1	Josie Knight	Great Britain	4:19.461		QG, WR
2	Federica Venturelli	Italy	4:22.909	+3.448	QG
3	Millie Couzens	Great Britain	4:24.415	+4.954	QB
4	Mischa Bredewold	Netherlands	4:25.464	+6.003	QB
5	Lisa Klein	Germany	4:27.924	+8.463	
6	Mélanie Dupin	France	4:30.335	+10.874	
7	Jasmin Liechti	Switzerland	4:32.764	+13.303	
8	Linda Sanarini	Italy	4:33.141	+13.680	
9	Lotte Kopecky	Belgium	4:34.662	+15.201	
10	Luca Vierstraete	Belgium	4:35.703	+16.242	
11	Palina Konrad	Individual Neutral Athletes	4:36.915	+17.454	
12	Martyna Szczęsna	Poland	4:39.658	+20.197	
13	Lucy Bénézet Minns	Ireland	4:42.463	+23.002	
14	Iryna Chuyankova	Individual Neutral Athletes	4:42.607	+23.146	
15	Gwen Nothum	Luxembourg	4:42.900	+23.439	
16	Annika Liehner	Switzerland	4:42.972	+23.511	
17	Tamara Szalińska	Poland	4:49.403	+29.942	
18	Milana Ushakova	Ukraine	4:53.357	+33.896	
19	Ellen Hjøllund Klinge	Denmark	4:54.000	+34.539	
20	Nora Jenčušová	Slovakia	5:11.050	+51.589	

=== Finals ===
Rank	Name	Nation	Time	Behind	Notes
Gold medal final
1st place, gold medalist(s)	Josie Knight	Great Britain	4:22.353		
2nd place, silver medalist(s)	Federica Venturelli	Italy	4:27.891	+5.538	
Bronze medal final
3rd place, bronze medalist(s)	Millie Couzens	Great Britain	4:24.342		
4	Mischa Bredewold	Netherlands	4:28.371	+4.029	
