= 2026 UCI Track Cycling World Championships – Men's individual pursuit =

Men's individual pursuit at the 2026 UCI Track Cycling World Championships
- Venue: Shanghai Velodrome
- Location: Shanghai, China
- Dates: 16 October
- Competitors: 32 from 22 nations
- Winning time: 4:00.769

Medalists
gold medal	Jonathan Milan	Italy
silver medal	Frederik Madsen	Denmark
bronze medal	Filippo Ganna	Italy

The Men's individual pursuit competition at the 2026 UCI Track Cycling World Championships was held on 16 October 2026.

== Results ==
=== Qualifying ===
The qualifying was started at 13:00. The two fastest riders raced for gold, the third and fourth fastest riders raced for bronze.

Rank	Name	Nation	Time	Behind	Notes
1	Jonathan Milan	Italy	3:58.850		QG, WR
2	Frederik Madsen	Denmark	3:59.979	+1.129	QG
3	Filippo Ganna	Italy	4:00.976	+2.126	QB
4	Rasmus Pedersen	Denmark	4:01.466	+2.616	QB
5	Ashlin Barry	United States	4:02.304	+3.454	
6	Oliver Wood	Great Britain	4:03.731	+4.881	
7	Ivo Oliveira	Portugal	4:04.343	+5.493	
8	Taylor Phinney	United States	4:05.529	+6.679	
9	Ethan Vernon	Great Britain	4:05.529	+6.679	
10	Carson Mattern	Canada	4:05.634	+6.784	
11	Marshall Erwood	New Zealand	4:07.212	+8.362	
12	Lev Gonov	Individual Neutral Athletes	4:07.545	+8.695	
13	Paul-Felix Petry	Germany	4:07.840	+8.990	
14	James Moriarty	Australia	4:08.026	+9.176	
15	Witse Bertels	Belgium	4:08.783	+9.933	
16	Max-David Briese	Germany	4:09.830	+10.980	
17	Mathieu Dupé	France	4:10.794	+11.944	
18	Chris Ernst	Canada	4:11.016	+12.166	
19	Daniel Morton	New Zealand	4:11.349	+12.499	
20	Erwan Besnier	France	4:12.371	+13.521	
21	Ng Pak Hang	Hong Kong	4:12.813	+13.963	
22	Kanta Umezawa	Japan	4:13.799	+14.949	
23	Pascal Tappeiner	Switzerland	4:13.850	+15.000	
24	Pei Zhengyu	China	4:14.091	+15.241	
25	Vadim Grechishkin	Individual Neutral Athletes	4:15.040	+16.190	
26	Matyáš Koblížek	Czechia	4:15.112	+16.262	
27	Joan Martí Bennassar	Spain	4:16.760	+17.910	
28	Mats Poot	Switzerland	4:17.155	+18.305	
29	Sebastián Ruiz	Mexico	4:17.873	+19.023	
30	Ilya Karabutov	Kazakhstan	4:24.295	+25.445	
31	Muhammad Andy Royan	Indonesia	4:28.835	+29.985	
32	Vitālijs Korņilovs	Latvia	4:28.904	+30.054	

=== Finals ===
The finals were started at 19:15.

Rank	Name	Nation	Time	Behind
Gold medal race
1st place, gold medalist(s)	Jonathan Milan	Italy	4:00.769	
2nd place, silver medalist(s)	Frederik Madsen	Denmark	4:06.038	+5.269
Bronze medal race
3rd place, bronze medalist(s)	Filippo Ganna	Italy	4:02.275	
4	Rasmus Pedersen	Denmark	4:07.291	+5.016
