= Ashton Lambie =

American cyclist

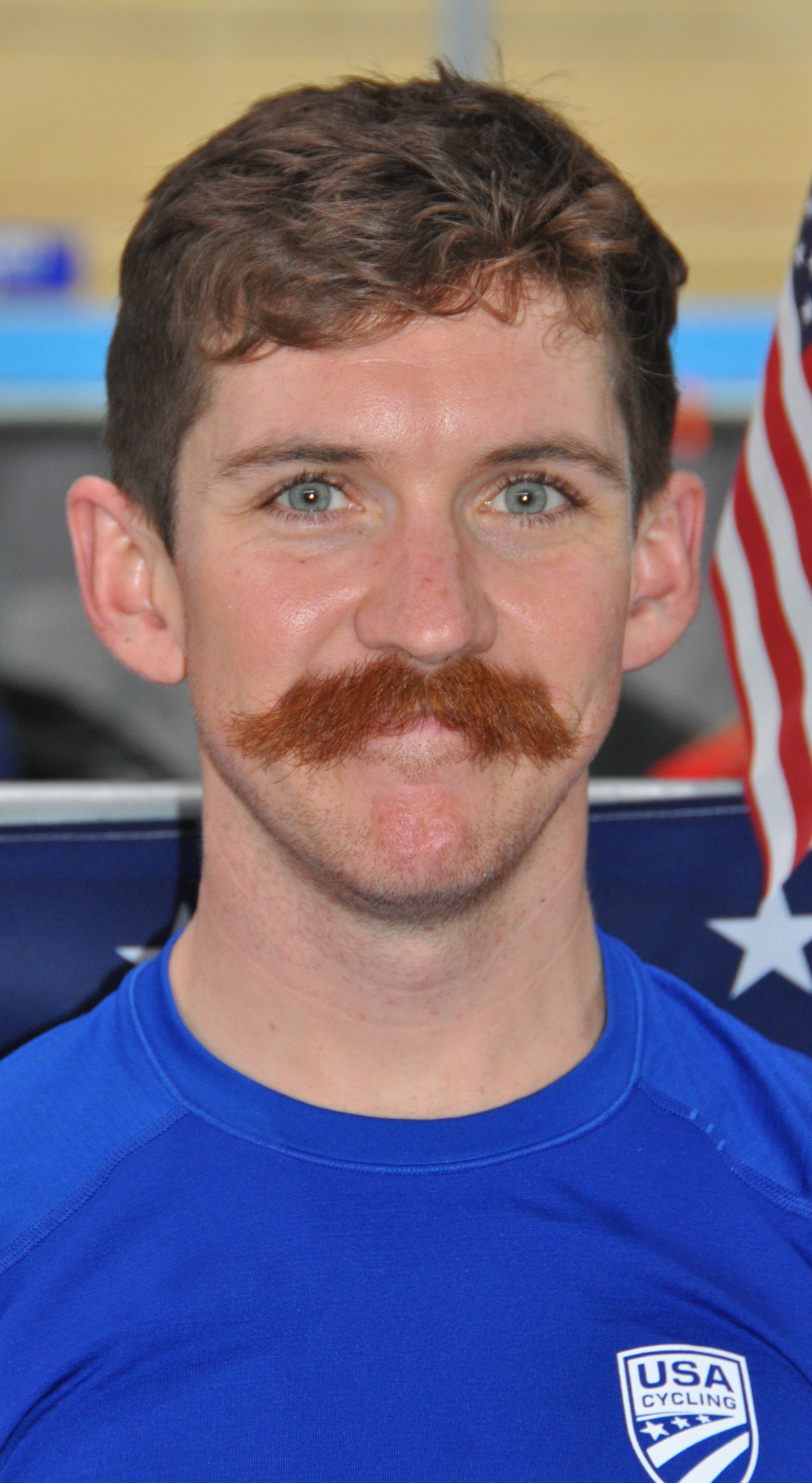
- Lambie in 2020

Personal information
- Born: December 12, 1990 (age 35) Lincoln, Nebraska, United States

Cycling career
- Sport: Cycling
- Disciplines: Track cycling, gravel
- Role: Rider

Major wins
- Track World Championships Individual pursuit (2021)
Medal record
Men's track cycling
Representing the United States
World Championships
Gold medal – first place	2021 Roubaix	Individual pursuit
Silver medal – second place	2020 Berlin	Individual pursuit
Pan American Games
Gold medal – first place	2019 Lima	Team pursuit
Pan American Championships
Gold medal – first place	2018 Aguascalientes	Individual pursuit
Gold medal – first place	2018 Aguascalientes	Team pursuit
Gold medal – first place	2019 Cochabamba	Individual pursuit
Silver medal – second place	2019 Cochabamba	Team pursuit

Ashton Lambie (born December 12, 1990) is an American track cyclist known for being the first person to complete an individual pursuit in under 4 minutes, and for his moustache.

== Career ==
Lambie was born in Lincoln, Nebraska. He is of partial Moravian and Czech descent and is a distant relative of Dale M. Cochran.

Lambie races on gravel in Kansas. In October 2015, he set the World Ultracycling Association record for cycling across his home state of Kansas from West to East. This record was surpassed a few months later in May 2016. In his debut at the Track National Championship, Lambie won the Individual Pursuit, and finished second in the omnium and points race. This earned Lambie a spot on Team USA. His first race with Team USA was the 2017 Pan-American Championships.

== Major results ==
2017
National Track Championships

1st Individual pursuit
2nd Omnium
2nd Points race

3rd Team pursuit, UCI Track World Cup, Santiago
2018
National Track Championships

1st Individual pursuit
3rd Omnium

Pan American Track Championships

1st Individual pursuit
1st Team pursuit

2019
1st Men's Unbound Gravel 100
Pan American Track Championships

1st Individual pursuit
2nd Team pursuit

2020
2nd Individual pursuit, UCI Track World Championships
2021
1st Individual pursuit, UCI Track World Championships

== World records ==
Date	Event	Location	Discipline	Time	Ref
August 31, 2018	2018 Pan American Track Cycling Championships	Aguascalientes, Mexico	Individual pursuit	4:07.251	
September 6, 2019	2019 Pan American Track Cycling Championships	Cochabamba, Bolivia	Individual pursuit	4:06.407	
September 6, 2019	2019 Pan American Track Cycling Championships	Cochabamba, Bolivia	Individual pursuit	4:05.423	
August 18, 2021		Aguascalientes, Mexico	Individual pursuit	3:59.93	

== Personal life ==
Lambie is a partner of racing cyclist and NASA astronaut Christina Birch.
