= Jonathan Milan =

Italian cyclist (born 2000)

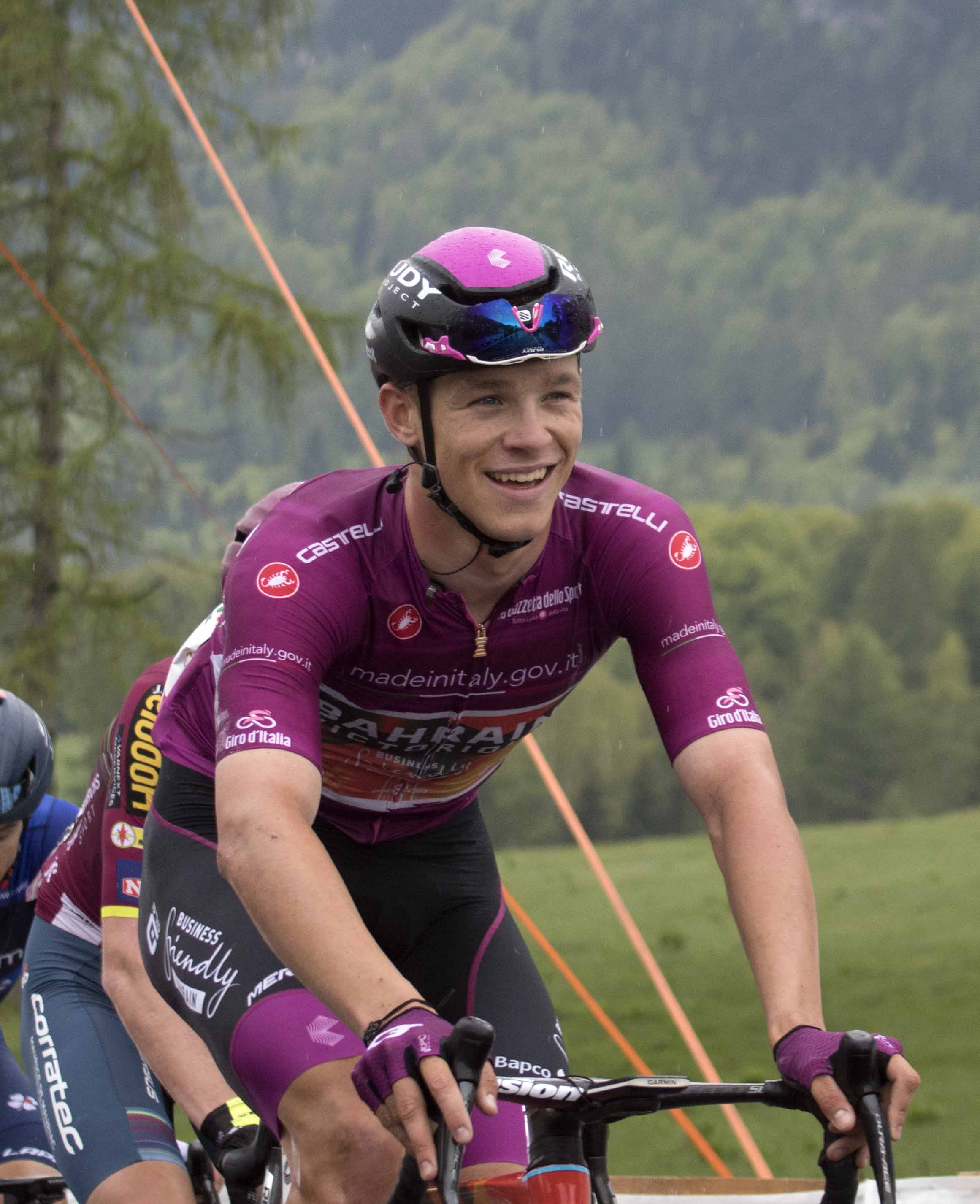
- Milan at the 2023 Giro d'Italia

Personal information
- Nickname: The Italian Stallion
- Born: 1 October 2000 (age 26) Tolmezzo, Italy
- Height: 1.93 m (6 ft 4 in)
- Weight: 84 kg (185 lb)

Cycling career
- Sport: Cycling
- Current team: Lidl–Trek
- Disciplines: Track; Road
- Role: Rider
- Rider type: Sprinter (road); pursuitist (track)

Professional teams
- 2019–2020: Cycling Team Friuli
- 2021–2023: Team Bahrain Victorious
- 2024–: Lidl–Trek

Major wins
- Road Grand Tours Tour de France Points classification (2025) 2 individual stages (2025) Giro d'Italia Points classification (2023, 2024) 5 individual stages (2023, 2024, 2026) One-day races and Classics National Road Race Championships (2026) Track Olympic Games Team pursuit (2021) World Championships Team pursuit (2021) Individual pursuit (2024, 2026)
Medal record
Men's track cycling
Representing Italy
Olympic Games
Gold medal – first place	2020 Tokyo	Team pursuit
Bronze medal – third place	2024 Paris	Team pursuit
World Championships
Gold medal – first place	2021 Roubaix	Team pursuit
Gold medal – first place	2024 Ballerup	Individual pursuit
Gold medal – first place	2026 Shanghai	Individual pursuit
Silver medal – second place	2021 Roubaix	Individual pursuit
Silver medal – second place	2022 Saint-Quentin-en-Yvelines	Individual pursuit
Silver medal – second place	2022 Saint-Quentin-en-Yvelines	Team pursuit
Silver medal – second place	2023 Glasgow	Team pursuit
Silver medal – second place	2026 Shanghai	Team pursuit
Bronze medal – third place	2020 Berlin	Team pursuit
Bronze medal – third place	2023 Glasgow	Individual pursuit
European Championships
Gold medal – first place	2021 Grenchen	Individual pursuit
Gold medal – first place	2023 Grenchen	Individual pursuit
Gold medal – first place	2023 Grenchen	Team pursuit
Silver medal – second place	2020 Plovdiv	Individual pursuit
Silver medal – second place	2020 Plovdiv	Team pursuit
Bronze medal – third place	2020 Plovdiv	1 km time trial
Bronze medal – third place	2024 Apeldoorn	Team pursuit
European Under-23 Championships
Silver medal – second place	2020 Fiorenzuola	Team pursuit

Jonathan Milan (born 1 October 2000) is an Italian professional track and road cyclist, who currently rides for UCI WorldTeam Lidl–Trek.

== Career ==
=== Track ===
Milan rode in the men's team pursuit event at the 2020 UCI Track Cycling World Championships in Berlin, Germany, winning a bronze medal. He won the gold medal in the team pursuit at the 2020 Summer Olympics held at Tokyo in 2021, setting a new world record. He was also on the winning team for the team pursuit at the UCI World Championships that year, also taking silver in the individual pursuit. In 2022, Milan won silver medals at the World Championships in both the team and individual pursuit, followed by a silver and bronze medal in 2023, respectively.

Milan won the gold medal in the individual pursuit at both the 2024 and 2026 World Championships, setting a new world record on both occasions.

=== Road ===
Milan rode for Cycling Team Friuli as an under-23 rider in 2019 and 2020, and was crowned the 2020 national under-23 time trial champion.

In 2021, he stepped up to the World Tour, joining Team Bahrain Victorious. The following season, he won his first pro road races, taking two stages of the CRO Race. He took an early season win in 2023 on stage two of the Saudi Tour, before competing in the Giro d'Italia in May, his first Grand Tour. Milan won the stage two sprint, going on to finish second on four more occasions. He ultimately won the Points classification ahead of Derek Gee. He ended the year at the Tour of Guangxi in October, where he won the second stage.

In February 2024, Milan won stage 3 of the Volta a la Comunitat Valenciana, his first race of the season. He then won two stages of Tirreno–Adriatico in March. This was followed by a campaign in the spring classics, where he finished in 5th in Gent–Wevelgem and 7th in the Dwars door Vlaanderen. His next race was the Giro d'Italia for the second year in a row, where he again saw success early on, taking second on stage three before winning the following day.

== Personal life ==
He is named after the seagull in Richard Bach's novella Jonathan Livingston Seagull, which his mother read during her pregnancy. His father Flavio and younger brother Matteo are also cyclists.

== Major results ==
=== Road ===
2017
1st Circuito di Orsago Juniors
1st Coppa Montes
2018
1st Circuito di Orsago Juniors
1st Stage 2 Giro del Nordest d'Italia
2020
1st Time trial, National Under-23 Championships
1st Stage 5 Giro Ciclistico d'Italia
5th Time trial, UEC European Under-23 Championships
2022 (2 pro wins)
CRO Race

1st Points classification
1st Stages 1 & 2

2023 (3)
Giro d'Italia

1st Points classification
1st Stage 2

1st Stage 2 Tour of Guangxi
5th Overall Saudi Tour

1st Stage 2

2024 (11)
Giro d'Italia

1st Points classification
1st Stages 4, 11 & 13

Tirreno–Adriatico

1st Points classification
1st Stages 4 & 7

Deutschland Tour

1st Points classification
1st Prologue & Stages 1 & 3

Volta a la Comunitat Valenciana

1st Points classification
1st Stage 3

Renewi Tour

1st Stages 1 & 3

2nd Hamburg Cyclassics
4th Time trial, National Championships
5th Gent–Wevelgem
7th Dwars door Vlaanderen
2025 (9)
1st Kampioenschap van Vlaanderen
Tour de France

1st Points classification
1st Stages 8 & 17

Tirreno–Adriatico

1st Points classification
1st Stages 2 & 7

UAE Tour

1st Points classification
1st Stages 1 & 4

Volta a la Comunitat Valenciana

1st Stages 1 (TTT) & 5

1st Stage 2 Critérium du Dauphiné
2nd Classic Brugge–De Panne
3rd Gent–Wevelgem
6th Kuurne–Brussels–Kuurne
2026 (12)
1st Road race, National Championships
UAE Tour

1st Points classification
1st Stages 4, 5 & 7

AlUla Tour

1st Points classification
1st Stages 1 & 2

Tour de Pologne

1st Stages 1, 2 & 3

1st Stage 21 Giro d'Italia
1st Stage 1 Renewi Tour
1st Stage 7 Tirreno–Adriatico

==== Grand Tour general classification results timeline ====
Grand Tour	2021	2022	2023	2024	2025
Giro d'Italia	—	—	103	118	—
Tour de France	—	—	—	—	146
Vuelta a España	—	—	—	—	—

==== Classics results timeline ====
Monument	2021	2022	2023	2024	2025
Milan–San Remo	—	115	128	69	81
Tour of Flanders	DNF	—	—	67	—
Paris–Roubaix	DNF	—	DNF	DNF	101
Liège–Bastogne–Liège	—	—	—	—	—
Giro di Lombardia	—	—	—	—	—
Classic	2021	2022	2023	2024	2025
Kuurne–Brussels–Kuurne	—	—	12	—	6
Brugge–De Panne	103	39	70	—	2
Gent–Wevelgem	DNF	—	DNF	5	3
Dwars door Vlaanderen	89	—	—	7	DNF
Hamburg Cyclassics	—	95	114	2	DNF

Legend
—	Did not compete
DNF	Did not finish

=== Track ===
2020
UEC European Championships

2nd Individual pursuit
2nd Team pursuit
3rd Kilo

2nd Team pursuit, UEC European Under-23 Championships
3rd Team pursuit, UCI World Championships
2021
1st Team pursuit, Olympic Games
UCI World Championships

1st Team pursuit
2nd Individual pursuit

1st Individual pursuit, UEC European Championships
2022
UCI Nations Cup, Cali

1st Individual pursuit
1st Team pursuit

UCI World Championships

2nd Individual pursuit
2nd Team pursuit

2023
UEC European Championships

1st Individual pursuit
1st Team pursuit

UCI World Championships

2nd Team pursuit
3rd Individual pursuit

2024
1st Individual pursuit, UCI World Championships
3rd Team pursuit, Olympic Games
3rd Team pursuit, UEC European Championships
2026
UCI World Championships

1st Individual pursuit
2nd Team pursuit

==== World records ====
Date	Time	Meet	Event	Location
3 August 2021	3:42.307	2020 Olympics	Team Pursuit (with Filippo Ganna, Simone Consonni & Francesco Lamon)	Izu, Japan
4 August 2021	3:42.032	2020 Olympics	Team Pursuit (with Filippo Ganna, Simone Consonni & Francesco Lamon)	Izu, Japan
18 October 2024	3:59.153	2024 UCI Track Cycling World Championships	Individual Pursuit	Ballerup, Denmark
