= Velodrome Suisse =

Swiss indoor veledrome

Tissot Velodrome Switzerland
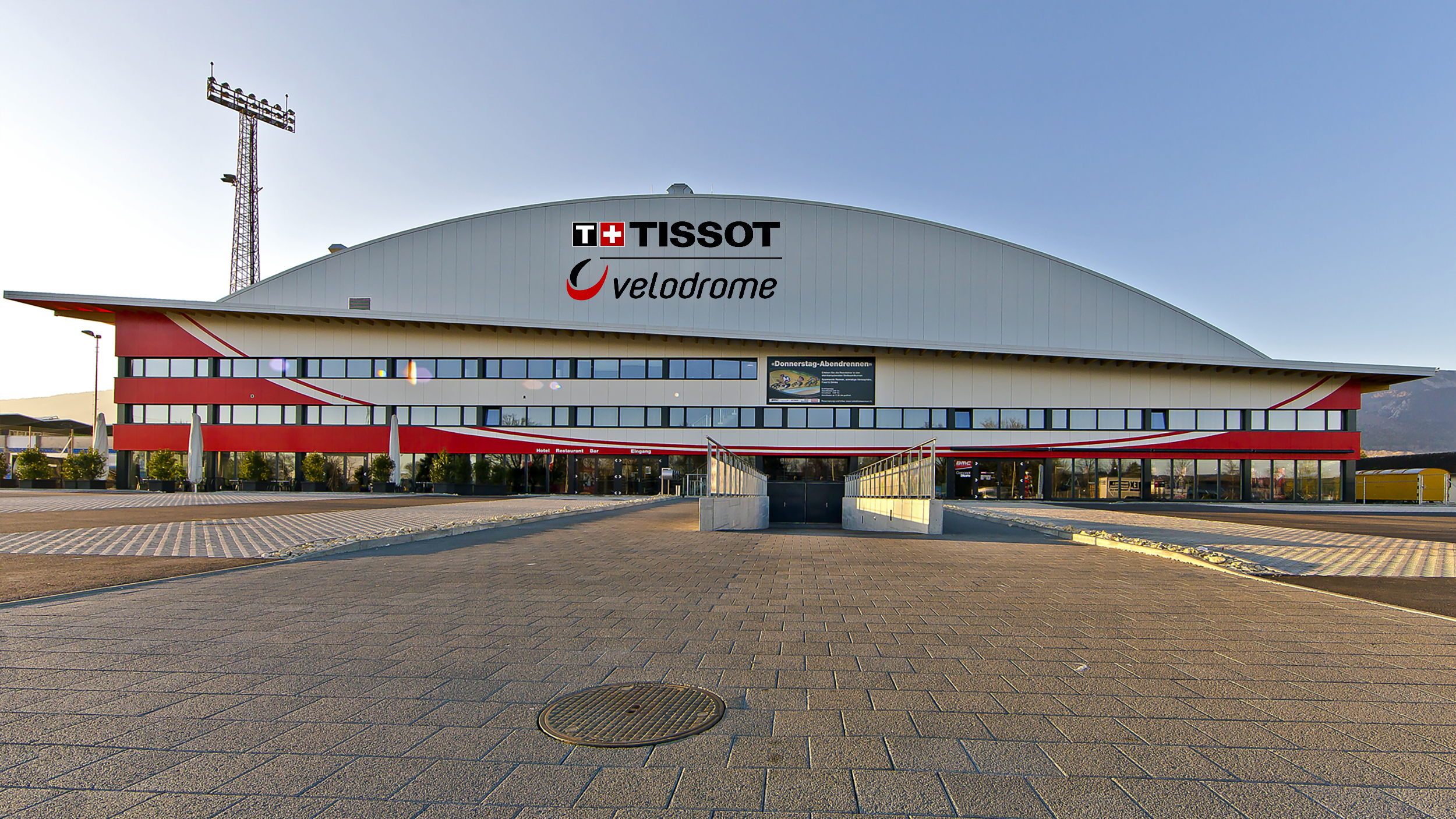
- Velodrome Suisse from 2016
- Interactive map of Tissot Velodrome Switzerland
- Location: Grenchen, Switzerland
- Coordinates: 47.185321°N 7.405519°E
- Owner: Velodrome Suisse AG
- Operator: Velodrome Suisse AG
- Capacity: 1800
- Surface: Siberian spruce wood

Construction
- Built: April 2012; 14 years ago
- Opened: 23 July 2013; 13 years ago
- Cost: CHF 17 million

Tenants
- 2015 UEC European Track Championships; 2021 UEC European Track Championships; 2023 UEC European Track Championships

The Velodrome Suisse is an indoor velodrome in Grenchen, Switzerland.

The hall covers an area of 8000 square meters and has a capacity for 1800 spectators. The velodrome itself is 250 m (270 yd) meters long, made of Siberian spruce wood and is applied according to the UCI standards. The banked curve is 46% steep and includes a vertical drop of 7 meters. The velodrome primary serves as a training center for the Swiss team and for the junior selection, but the track is also available to recreational cyclists. The interior consists of three different surfaces, which can also be used for other sports, fairs and concerts but also for cultural and economic events. In addition, the Velodrome Suisse houses a gym, a training center with medical and physio practice, the BMC Concept Store, Restaurant and Catering, and 30 hotel beds. The Swiss Cycling Federation also uses a portion of the office space as headquarters. The Velodrome is located between two stadiums for football and athletics, directly opposite the headquarters of the initiator, the Swiss entrepreneur Andy Rihs, owner of the bicycle brand BMC.

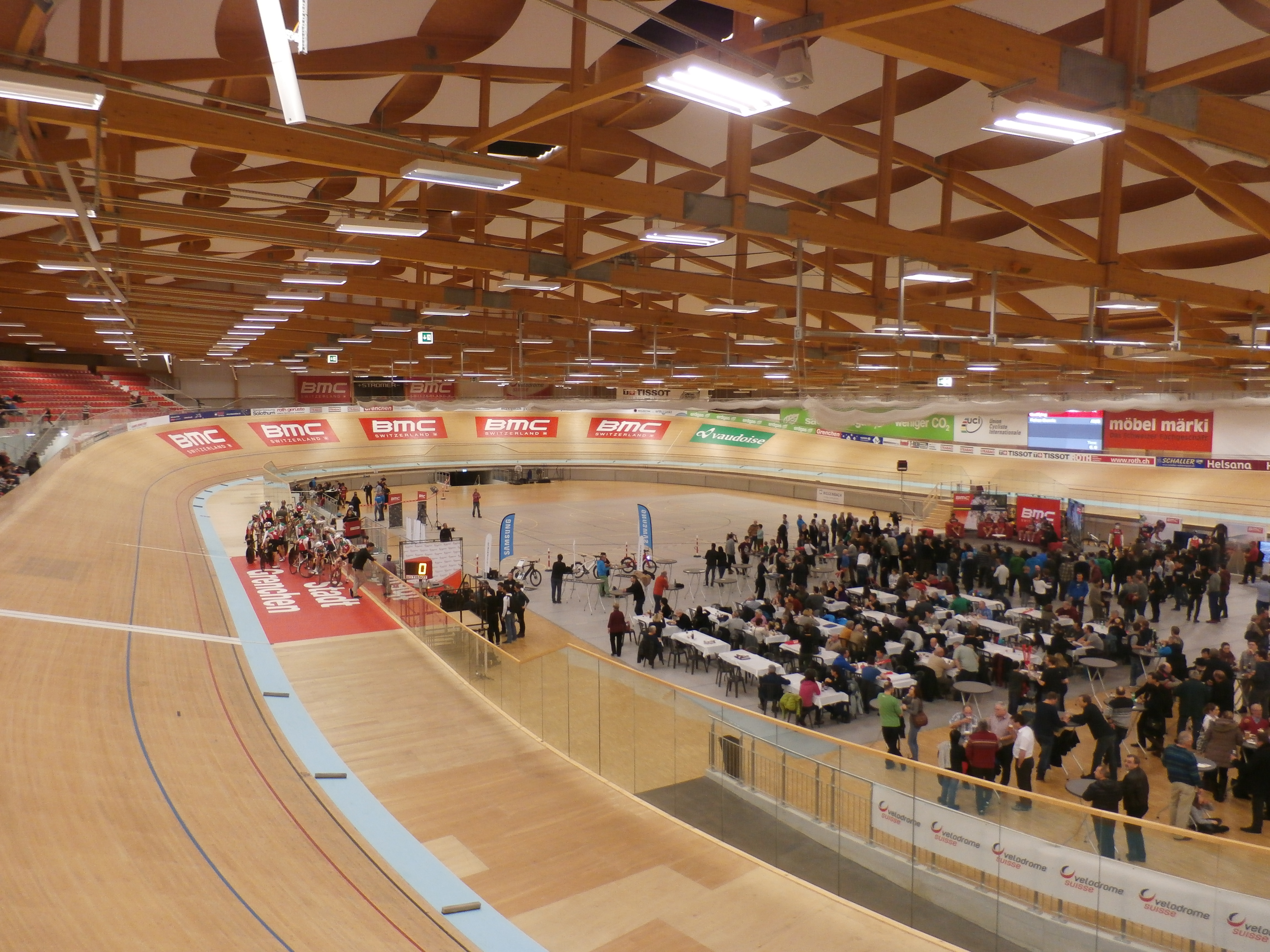
The inside of the velodrome

The CHF 17 million project was financed from both public and private donations. The Velodrome Suisse is the second modern indoor velodrome in Switzerland, after the World Cycling Centre of the Union Cycliste Internationale in Aigle. The hall was built according to the Minergie standard and built by a foundation set up specifically for this purpose, whose chairman is Rihs who dedicated himself two million francs.

In 2013 the second stage of the 2013 Tour de Romandie finished on the Velodrome Suisse, and in January 2014, a six-day race was held. On 23 June, the Velodrome was officially opened with an "open day".

On 18 September 2014 Jens Voigt rode at the velodrome a new hour record with a distance of 51.115 km. On 8 February 2015 the Australian Rohan Dennis beat the hour record of Matthias Brändle, who had broken it in the meantime, with a distance of 52.491 km. On 19 August 2022, Daniel Bigham broke the hour record at the velodrome with a distance of 55.548 km.

Joss Lowden set the women's world hour record 48.405 km on 30 September 2021. Ellen van Dijk improved this to 49.254 km on 23 May 2022.

From 14 to 18 October 2015, the UEC European Track Championships were held at the velodrome.

== See also ==
- List of cycling tracks and velodromes
