= Konya Velodrome =

Track cycling venue in Konya, Turkery

- Interactive map of Konya Velodrome
- Location: Karahüyük Mah., Meram, Konya, Turkey
- Coordinates: 37°49′10.4″N 32°24′01.4″E
- Elevation: 1,120 m (3,670 ft)
- Owner: Metropolitan Municipality of Konya
- Capacity: 2,275

Construction
- Groundbreaking: 2021
- Opened: 2022

Konya Velodrome (Turkish: Konya Velodromu) is an indoor velodrome or track cycling venue in Konya, Turkey. It is the country's first and the only modern velodrome.

The velodrome is located inside the Nation's Park (Turkish: Millet bahçesi) in the Karahüyük neighborhood of Meram district of Konya, and is owned by the Metropolitan Municaplity in Konya. Its track is 250 m (820 ft) long, 8.5 m (28 ft) wide and has a banking of 45.5°. It has a seating capacity of 2,275. The velodrome is able is able to host international events.

Projected in 2019, the construction began with ground breaking in the beginning of 2021. The venue was opened on 5 August 2022 hosting the cycling events of the 2021 Islamic Solidarity Games held in Konya. It is Turkeys first and only velodrome meeting the modern standards.

== International events hosted ==
- 2025 UCI Track Cycling Nations Cup, 14–16 March 2025.
- 2026 UEC European Track Championships, 1–5 February 2026.

== See also ==
- List of cycling tracks and velodromes
