= Cycling at the 2020 Summer Olympics – Men's road time trial =

Men's road time trial at the Games of the XXXII Olympiad
- Olympic Cycling
- Venues: Fuji Speedway; 44.2 km (27.5 mi)
- Date: 28 July 2021
- Competitors: 39 from 31 nations
- Winning time: 55:04.19

Medalists
1st place, gold medalist(s)		Primož Roglič	Slovenia
2nd place, silver medalist(s)		Tom Dumoulin	Netherlands
3rd place, bronze medalist(s)		Rohan Dennis	Australia

The men's road time trial event at the 2020 Summer Olympics took place on 28 July 2021 around the Fuji Speedway in the Shizuoka Prefecture. 39 cyclists from 31 nations competed in the race, with everyone bar one rider eventually finishing.

The race was won by Primož Roglič of Slovenia. Roglič was around half a second behind the world champion, Filippo Ganna of Italy, at the first time check before eventually pulling ahead. He led by eight seconds at the end of the first lap before continuing to increase his lead towards the finish. He won by 1' 01" over Tom Dumoulin of the Netherlands. Dumoulin was third at the first time check, eventually engaging in a close battle for the silver medal, with less than five seconds separating the four riders behind Roglič. The bronze medal went to Rohan Dennis of Australia, a further two and a half seconds from Dumoulin.

== Background ==
This will be the 12th appearance of the event, previously held at every Summer Olympics from 1912 to 1932 before being replaced by the (mass start) road race; the men's time trial returned in 1996 and has been held at every Summer Olympics since. The reigning Olympic champion is Fabian Cancellara of Switzerland, who retired from professional cycling in 2016 and therefore won't be able to defend its title. The reigning World Champion is Filippo Ganna of Italy.

An event preview from Olympics.com predicted difficulty for flat time trial specialists due to the hilly course and identified the following as favourites:

Instead, look for someone like Roglič, Froome, or Rohan Dennis – two-time world champ in the time trial and an Olympic track silver medallist – to come to the fore. Young hotshot Remco Evenepoel of Belgium and Rio silver medallist Tom Dumoulin of the Netherlands – if he decides to return from his indefinite break – could also feature in the conversation.

Froome had earned Olympic bronze in the event in 2012 and 2016.

== Qualification ==
A National Olympic Committee (NOC) could enter up to 2 qualified cyclists in the men's road time trial. All quota places are assigned to the NOC, which may select the cyclists that compete. The time trial quota places did not allow NOCs to send additional cyclists; NOCs had to have qualified places in the road race to earn time trial quota places. There were 40 total quota spots available for the race, allocated as follows:

1. The first 30 nations in the UCI World Ranking received one spot each.
2. The 10 nations with the highest-ranked riders at the 2019 World Championship received one additional place each. An NOC could earn two places by qualifying in both ways; all 10 places in the World Championship were earned by NOCs that already had one place through world rankings.
3. There was an extra requirement that each continent should have at least two teams. This was not the case for Asia, which had only one. Thus, a spot was given to its second-ranked nation, Iran, at the expense of 30th-ranked Latvia. Because qualification was completed by 22 October 2019, it was unaffected by the COVID-19 pandemic.
4. One additional place was added for Refugee Olympic Team member Ahmad Wais.
5. Estonia had two spots but elected to send only one athlete. The free spot was given back to Latvia.
6. A Swiss and an Ecuadorian athlete withdrew, but they were not replaced.

== Competition format and course ==
The time trial is a race against the clock. The 39 competing cyclists were divided into three groups, with 13 riders in each group. The riders started at a minute and a half intervals while the interval between each group was 38 minutes. The time trial events used a 22.1-kilometre (13.7 mi) circuit that began on the Fuji Speedway before descending towards the exit. Afterwards, the riders gradually climbed for 5 kilometres (3.1 mi) towards the first intermediate time check. The riders then began another descent towards the second time check, looping back towards the entrance of the Speedway. After passing through the entrance, the riders tackled a 1.4-kilometre (0.87 mi) climb before going inside the Speedway proper. The riders rode through the Speedway before the lap ended on the finish line. The men rode this circuit twice for a total distance of 44.2 kilometres (27.5 mi). The elevation gain was approximately 846 metres (2,776 ft).

== Start list ==
Nations:

Cyclists	Nations
2	Australia - Belgium - Great Britain - Germany - Italy - New Zealand - Portugal - United States
1	23 nations

== Race overview ==
The time trial commenced at 14:00 Japan Standard Time (UTC+9) with Ahmad Wais (Refugee Olympic Team) the first rider off the start ramp. The first rider to set a fast time was Hugo Houle (Canada), with a time of 57:56.46. Stefan de Bod (South Africa) threatened his time but he eventually fell short by less than a second. No other rider in the first group threatened his time as Houle stayed in the hot seat until the next group of riders took to the course.

As the second group of riders started their rides, three riders challenged Houle's time: Remco Evenepoel (Belgium), Alberto Bettiol (Italy), and Rigoberto Urán (Colombia). At the first time check, Evenepoel was six seconds off Houle's time while Urán was 16 seconds down. Bettiol soon set the fastest time at the first time check, five seconds ahead of Houle. At the end of the first lap, Evenepoel and Urán were four and five seconds down on Houle, respectively. Meanwhile, Bettiol faded towards the end of the first lap, finishing the lap with a deficit of 21 seconds. All three riders began to edge ahead of Houle as they rode through the second lap. Evenepoel was the first rider to knock Houle off the top spot, finishing 35 seconds faster. Bettiol was almost 17 seconds slower than Evenepoel at the finish before Urán pushed Evenepoel into provisional second, finishing around two and a half seconds faster than the Belgian.

The final group of riders soon took to the course. The first rider to threaten Urán's time was Tom Dumoulin (Netherlands). Dumoulin was around 16 seconds faster than Bettiol's time at the first time check before his time was beaten by Primož Roglič (Slovenia), who was two and a half seconds faster. Rohan Dennis (Australia), Stefan Küng (Switzerland), and Wout van Aert (Belgium) were less than 10 seconds behind Roglič's time at the first time check before the world champion, Filippo Ganna (Italy), was half a second faster than Roglič. As the riders finished the first lap, Roglič ended up taking the top spot, with no other rider within eight seconds of his time. In the second lap, Roglič gradually built his advantage as he maintained his pace while the other riders began to fade. The battle for the silver and bronze medals also intensified as Dumoulin, Dennis, Küng, and Ganna were within five seconds of each other for most of the time. Kasper Asgreen (Denmark) and van Aert also faded in the second lap, losing considerable time. At the finish, Dumoulin was the first rider to knock Urán off the top spot, finishing more than a minute ahead. However, Roglič immediately beat Dumoulin's time as he finished with a time of 55:04.19, more than a minute ahead of Dumoulin. No one would threaten Roglič's time as he took the gold medal. Dennis came close to beating Dumoulin but he fell short by two and a half seconds to go into provisional third. Küng was also challenging the times of Dumoulin and Dennis before finishing at less than half a second from Dennis's time. The last rider to finish was Ganna. He eventually came in at almost two seconds down on Dennis, finishing without a medal. Thus, the silver medal went to Dumoulin while the bronze medal went to Dennis.

== Results ==
Result
Rank	#	Cyclist	Nation	Time	Diff.
1st place, gold medalist(s)	7	Primož Roglič	Slovenia	55:04.19	
2nd place, silver medalist(s)	10	Tom Dumoulin	Netherlands	56:05.58	+ 1:01.39
3rd place, bronze medalist(s)	5	Rohan Dennis	Australia	56:08.09	+ 1:03.90
4	3	Stefan Küng	Switzerland	56:08.49	+ 1:04.30
5	1	Filippo Ganna	Italy	56:09.93	+ 1:05.74
6	2	Wout van Aert	Belgium	56:44.72	+ 1:40.53
7	8	Kasper Asgreen	Denmark	56:52.21	+ 1:48.02
8	19	Rigoberto Urán	Colombia	57:18.69	+ 2:14.50
9	24	Remco Evenepoel	Belgium	57:21.27	+ 2:17.08
10	12	Patrick Bevin	New Zealand	57:24.29	+ 2:20.10
11	23	Alberto Bettiol	Italy	57:38.06	+ 2:33.87
12	6	Geraint Thomas	Great Britain	57:46.61	+ 2:42.42
13	33	Hugo Houle	Canada	57:56.46	+ 2:52.27
14	34	Stefan de Bod	South Africa	57:57.10	+ 2:52.91
15	14	Maximilian Schachmann	Germany	58:33.82	+ 3:29.63
16	9	João Almeida	Portugal	58:33.97	+ 3:29.78
17	4	Rémi Cavagna	France	58:39.06	+ 3:34.87
18	16	Maciej Bodnar	Poland	58:47.10	+ 3:42.91
19	35	Nikias Arndt	Germany	58:49.39	+ 3:45.20
20	15	Aleksandr Vlasov	ROC	58:55.40	+ 3:51.21
21	27	Nelson Oliveira	Portugal	58:59.22	+ 3:55.03
22	32	Tanel Kangert	Estonia	59:05.25	+ 4:01.06
23	13	Tobias Foss	Norway	59:51.68	+ 4:47.49
24	11	Brandon McNulty	United States	59:57.73	+ 4:53.54
25	29	George Bennett	New Zealand	1:00:28.39	+ 5:24.20
26	30	Michael Kukrle	Czech Republic	1:00:41.55	+ 5:37.36
27	25	Richie Porte	Australia	1:00:53.67	+ 5:49.48
28	31	Nicolas Roche	Ireland	1:01:23.13	+ 6:18.94
29	26	Tao Geoghegan Hart	Great Britain	1:01:44.81	+ 6:40.62
30	21	Toms Skujiņš	Latvia	1:02:04.93	+ 7:00.74
31	20	Patrick Konrad	Austria	1:02:05.08	+ 7:00.89
32	18	Alexey Lutsenko	Kazakhstan	1:02:21.67	+ 7:17.48
33	36	Amanuel Ghebreigzabhier	Eritrea	1:03:22.80	+ 8:18.61
34	28	Lawson Craddock	United States	1:03:52.99	+ 8:48.80
35	38	Saeid Safarzadeh	Iran	1:05:14.62	+ 10:10.43
36	37	Azzedine Lagab	Algeria	1:05:21.53	+ 10:17.34
37	22	Lukáš Kubiš	Slovakia	1:06:25.20	+ 11:21.01
38	39	Ahmad Wais	Refugee Olympic Team	1:08:40.46	+ 13.36.27
—	17	Ion Izagirre	Spain	DNF	
