= 2019 UCI Road World Championships – Men's time trial =

Cycling event

Men's time trial
2019 UCI Road World Championships
- Time trial Rainbow jersey

Race details
- Dates: 25 September 2019
- Distance: 54 km (34 mi)
- Winning time: 1h 05' 05.35"

Medalists
	Gold	(Australia) Rohan Dennis (AUS)
	Silver	(Belgium) Remco Evenepoel (BEL)
	Bronze	(Italy) Filippo Ganna (ITA)

The Men's time trial of the 2019 UCI Road World Championships was a cycling event that took place on 25 September 2019 in Harrogate, England. It was the 26th edition of the championship, for which Rohan Dennis of Australia was the defending champion, having won in 2018. 57 riders from 38 nations entered the competition.

Dennis successfully defended his title, becoming the first rider since Tony Martin (2011–2013) to retain the rainbow jersey for the time trial. Dennis finished 1 minute, 8.93 seconds ahead of the European champion Remco Evenepoel from Belgium. The bronze medal was won by Filippo Ganna of Italy, finishing 2.16 seconds ahead of fourth-placed Patrick Bevin from New Zealand; Ganna finished 1 minute, 55 seconds down on Dennis.

== Course ==
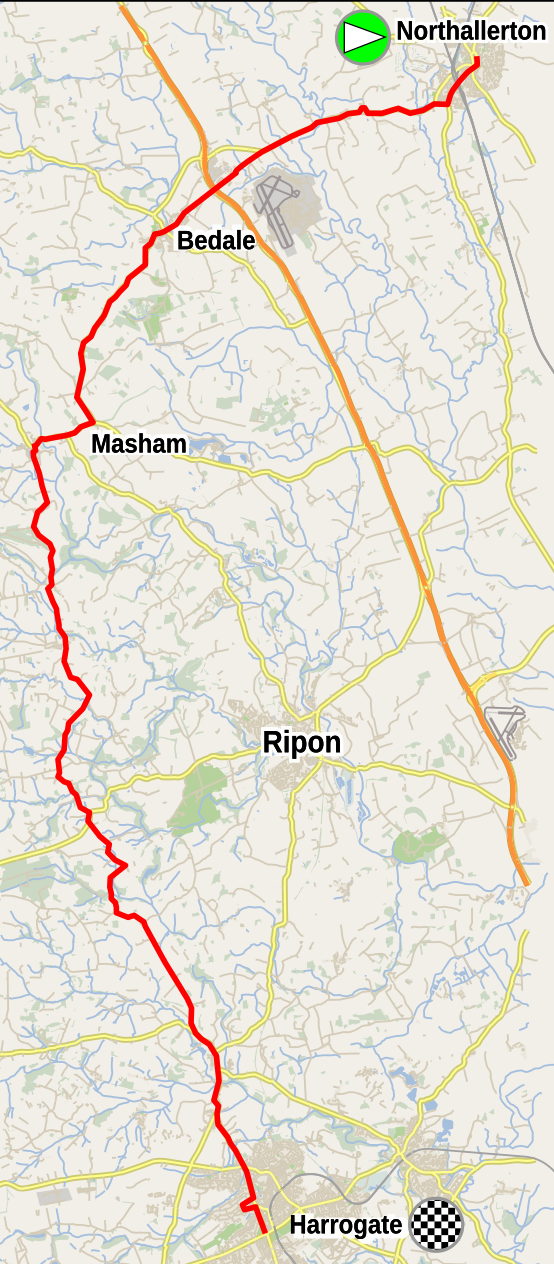
The course map

The race consisted of a route 54 kilometres (34 miles) in length, starting from Northallerton and ending in Harrogate.

== Qualification ==
The outgoing World Champion and the current continental champions were also able to take part in addition to those who were entered by qualifying nations.

Champion	Name	Note
Outgoing world champion	Rohan Dennis (AUS)	Competed
European champion	Remco Evenepoel (BEL)	Competed
African champion	Stefan de Bod (RSA)	Competed
Asian champion	Daniil Fominykh (KAZ)	Competed
Oceanian champion	Ben Dyball (AUS)	Did not compete
Pan American champion	Brandon Rivera (COL)	Did not compete

=== Participating nations ===
57 cyclists from 38 nations competed in the event. The number of cyclists per nation is shown in parentheses.

- Argentina (1)
- Australia (1)
- Austria (2)
- Belarus (1)
- Belgium (3)
- Canada (1)
- Colombia (1)
- Czech Republic (2)
- Denmark (2)
- Estonia (1)
- France (2)
- Germany (2)
- Ghana (1)
- Great Britain (2)
- Iceland (1)
- Ireland (2)
- Italy (2)
- Kazakhstan (2)
- Kuwait (1)
- Lithuania (1)
- Luxembourg (1)
- Netherlands (2)
- New Zealand (1)
- Namibia (1)
- Paraguay (1)
- Poland (2)
- Portugal (1)
- Romania (1)
- Russia (1)
- Slovakia (1)
- Slovenia (2)
- South Africa (1)
- Spain (2)
- Switzerland (2)
- Syria (1)
- Taiwan (1)
- United States (2)
- Uzbekistan (1)

== Final classification ==
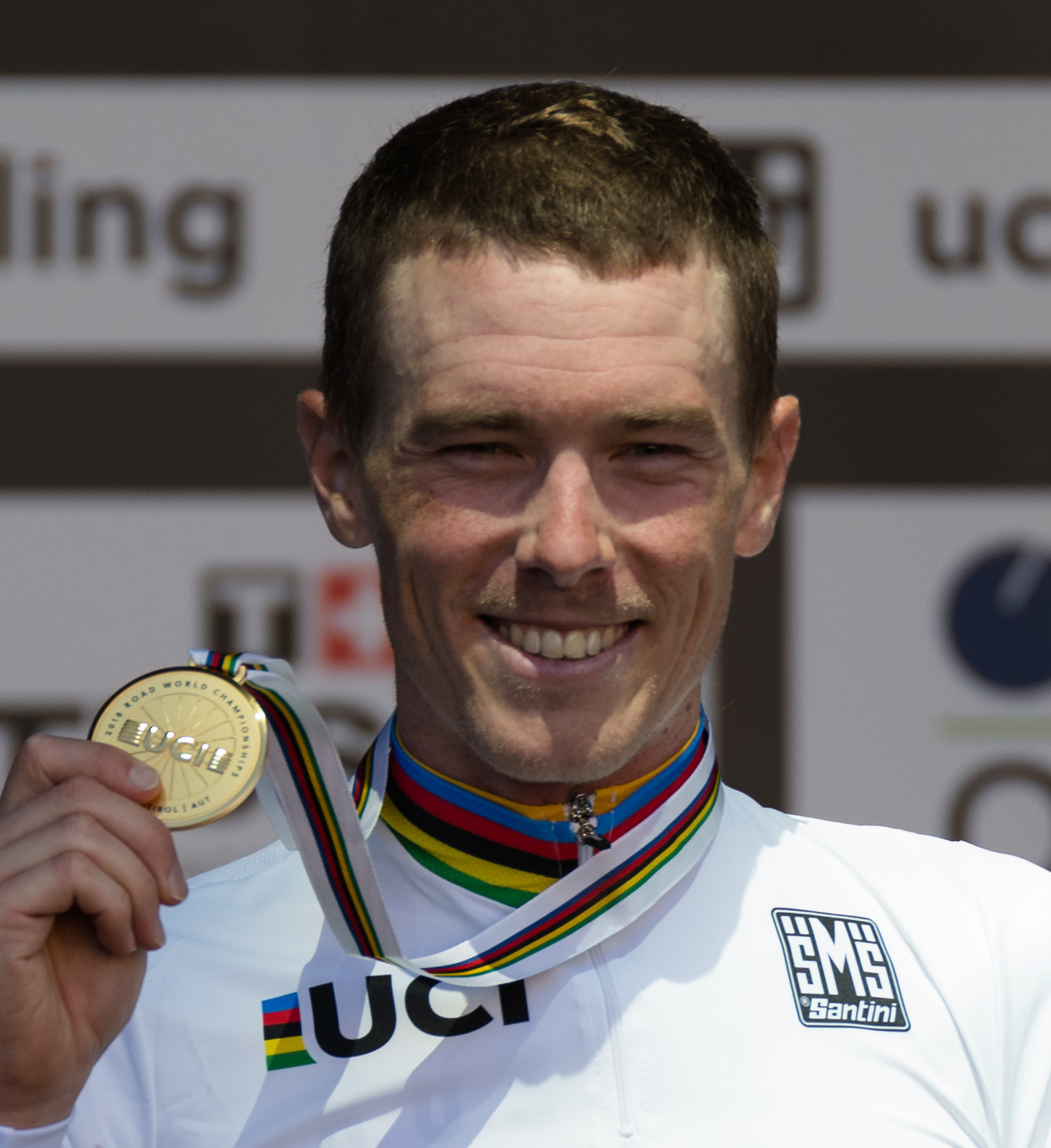
Rohan Dennis, pictured at the 2018 UCI Road World Championships, became the first rider to retain the world time trial title since Tony Martin in 2013.

All 57 race starters completed the 54-kilometre (34-mile)-long course.

Rank	Rider	Time
1	(Australia) Rohan Dennis (AUS)	1h 05' 05.35"
2	(Belgium) Remco Evenepoel (BEL)	+ 1' 08.93"
3	(Italy) Filippo Ganna (ITA)	+ 1' 55.00"
4	(New Zealand) Patrick Bevin (NZL)	+ 1' 57.16"
5	(United Kingdom) Alex Dowsett (GBR)	+ 2' 01.77"
6	(United States) Lawson Craddock (USA)	+ 2' 07.27"
7	(Estonia) Tanel Kangert (EST)	+ 2' 07.60"
8	(Portugal) Nelson Oliveira (POR)	+ 2' 09.80"
9	(Germany) Tony Martin (GER)	+ 2' 27.14"
10	(Switzerland) Stefan Küng (SWI)	+ 2' 46.66"
11	(Belgium) Victor Campenaerts (BEL)	+ 2' 49.52"
12	(Slovenia) Primož Roglič (SLO)	+ 3' 00.14"
13	(Australia) Luke Durbridge (AUS)	+ 3' 00.77"
14	(United Kingdom) John Archibald (GBR)	+ 3' 10.93"
15	(Netherlands) Dylan van Baarle (NED)	+ 3' 36.48"
16	(Italy) Edoardo Affini (ITA)	+ 3' 37.21"
17	(Denmark) Kasper Asgreen (DEN)	+ 3' 37.77"
18	(France) Pierre Latour (FRA)	+ 3' 44.58"
19	(United States) Chad Haga (USA)	+ 3' 57.07"
20	(Poland) Maciej Bodnar (POL)	+ 4' 00.31"
21	(Netherlands) Jos van Emden (NED)	+ 4' 01.47"
22	(Germany) Nils Politt (GER)	+ 4' 10.20"
23	(Poland) Kamil Gradek (POL)	+ 4' 12.20"
24	(Spain) Jonathan Castroviejo (ESP)	+ 4' 18.73"
25	(Kazakhstan) Alexey Lutsenko (KAZ)	+ 4' 29.11"
26	(Republic of Ireland) Eddie Dunbar (IRL)	+ 4' 46.81"
27	(Canada) Hugo Houle (CAN)	+ 4' 57.22"
28	(France) Benjamin Thomas (FRA)	+ 4' 57.86"
29	(Denmark) Martin Toft Madsen (DEN)	+ 4' 58.19"
30	(Colombia) Daniel Martínez (COL)	+ 5' 04.62"
31	(Belarus) Vasil Kiryienka (BLR)	+ 5' 15.69"
32	(Republic of Ireland) Ryan Mullen (IRL)	+ 5' 16.02"
33	(Czech Republic) Jan Bárta (CZE)	+ 5' 21.92"
34	(Luxembourg) Bob Jungels (LUX)	+ 5' 36.70"
35	(Switzerland) Claudio Imhof (SWI)	+ 6' 11.50"
36	(Slovenia) Jan Tratnik (SLO)	+ 6' 14.50"
37	(Kazakhstan) Daniil Fominykh (KAZ)	+ 6' 50.40"
38	(Czech Republic) Josef Černý (CZE)	+ 6' 55.61"
39	(Spain) Lluís Mas (ESP)	+ 7' 01.96"
40	(Austria) Matthias Brändle (AUT)	+ 7' 22.15"
41	(South Africa) Stefan de Bod (RSA)	+ 7' 25.63"
42	(Russia) Alexander Evtushenko (RUS)	+ 8' 14.45"
43	(Argentina) Eduardo Sepúlveda (ARG)	+ 8' 44.18"
44	(Taiwan) Feng Chun-kai (TAI)	+ 9' 22.25"
45	(Lithuania) Ramūnas Navardauskas (LTU)	+ 10' 35.75"
46	(Slovakia) Ján Andrej Cully (SVK)	+ 10' 54.44"
47	(Uzbekistan) Muradjan Khalmuratov (UZB)	+ 12' 13.71"
48	(Belgium) Yves Lampaert (BEL)	+ 13' 16.01"
49	(Iceland) Rúnar Örn Ágústsson (ISL)	+ 14' 44.96"
50	(Syria) Ahmad Wais (SYR)	+ 14' 45.37"
51	(Romania) Eduard-Michael Grosu (ROM)	+ 14' 54.95"
52	(Paraguay) Gustavo Miño (PAR)	+ 15' 30.81"
53	(Kuwait) Khaled Alkhalifah (KUW)	+ 15' 32.88"
54	(Kuwait) Saied Jafer Alali (KUW)	+ 15' 51.75"
55	(Namibia) Drikus Coetzee (NAM)	+ 15' 54.51"
56	(Syria) Nazir Jaser (SYR)	+ 24' 57.74"
57	(Ghana) Christopher Symonds (GHA)	+ 28' 15.40"
