= Nazir Jaser =

Syrian cyclist

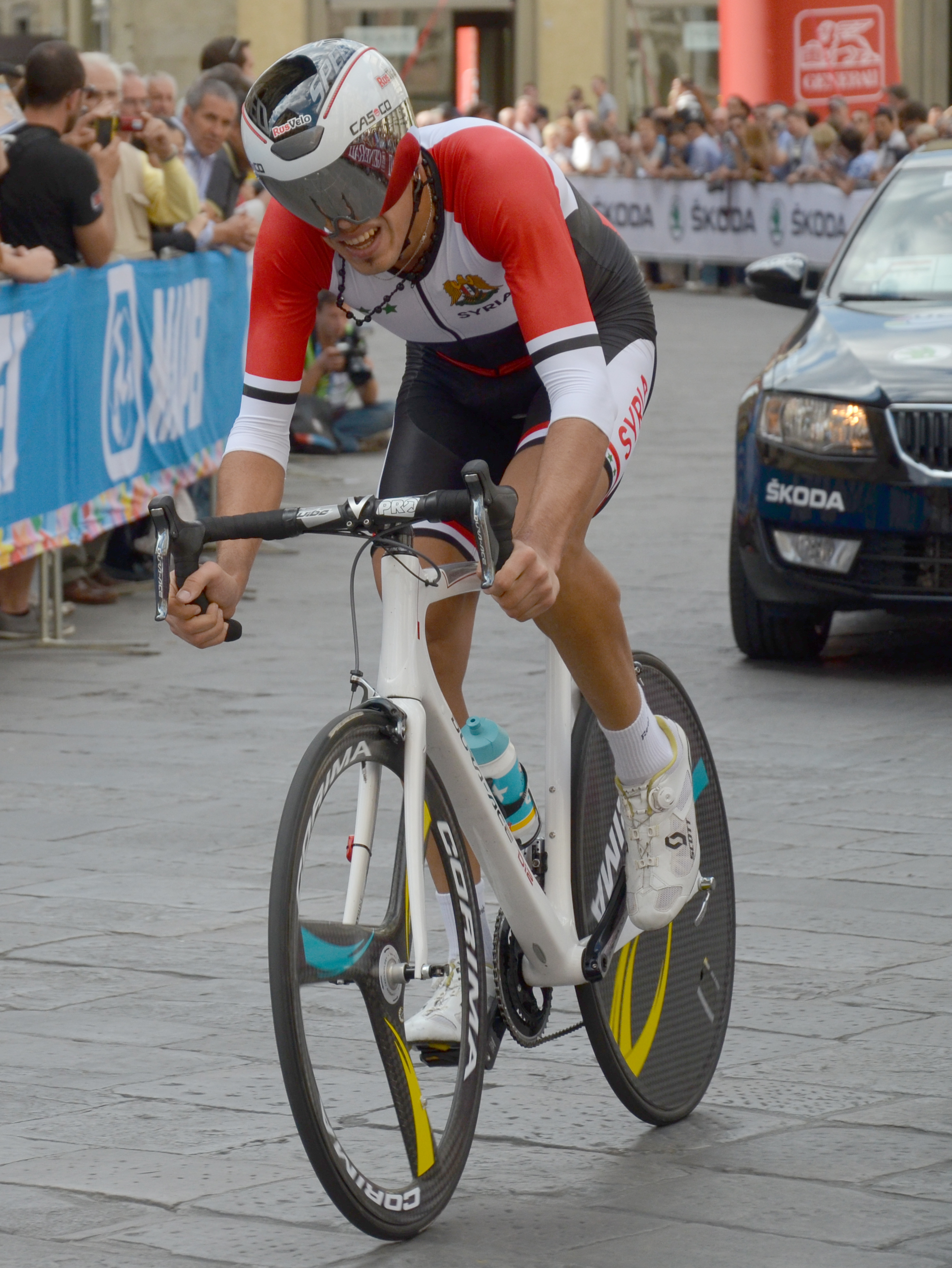
- Jaser at the 2013 World Time Trial Championships

Personal information
- Born: 10 April 1989 (age 37) Aleppo, Syria

Cycling career
- Sport: Cycling
- Discipline: Road
- Role: Rider

Nazir Jaser (born 10 April 1989) is a Syrian cyclist. He rode at the 2013 World Time Trial Championships and would ride again in 2017, 2019, and 2021.

Jaser was identified for the Refugee Olympic Team at the 2016 Summer Olympics, but was not selected.

== Biography ==
Jaser was born April 10, 1989, in Aleppo, Syria. He would begin cycling at age 4. Jaser's father would die when he was 10 years old, and starting at age 12 he would begin working as a tailor until war reached his town, forcing him to flee to Damascus.

He, the occasional captain, and the other members of the Syrian national team would sell their bikes and begin the journey to seek refuge abroad. He would be part of a group that used an inflatable boat to travel from Turkey to Greece, before he began building a new life for himself in Germany which he reached in 2015. The refugees rejoin the world of competitive cycling in a velodrome in Berlin, bonded under Frank Röglin who would act as a coach and teacher as they acclimated to their new home and formed an amateur cycling team.

== Major results ==
2011
4th Golan II
9th Overall Tour of Cappadocia
2015
National Road Championships

1st Road race
1st Time trial

4th Overall Tour d'Annaba
6th Circuit de Constantine
9th Critérium International de Sétif
