= 2018 UCI Road World Championships – Men's time trial =

Cycling event

Men's time trial
2018 UCI Road World Championships
- Time trial Rainbow jersey

Race details
- Dates: 26 September 2018
- Stages: 1
- Distance: 52.1 km (32.37 mi)
- Winning time: 1h 03' 02.57"

Medalists
| | Gold | (Australia) Rohan Dennis (AUS) |
| | Silver | (Netherlands) Tom Dumoulin (NED) |
| | Bronze | (Belgium) Victor Campenaerts (BEL) |

The Men's time trial of the 2018 UCI Road World Championships was a cycling event that took place on 26 September 2018 in Innsbruck, Austria. It was the 25th edition of the championship, for which Tom Dumoulin of the Netherlands was the defending champion, having won in 2017. 61 riders from 40 nations entered the competition.

Rohan Dennis became the second Australian male to win the world time trial title – after Michael Rogers, who won three consecutive titles between 2003 and 2005 – finishing almost a minute and a half clear of any other rider. The silver medal was more closely contested, with only 0.53 seconds covering the remaining medal-winners; it was settled in favour of defending champion Dumoulin, surpassing Belgium's Victor Campenaerts, the European champion, on the finish line.

== Course ==
The race consisted of a route 52.1 kilometres (32.4 miles) in length, starting from Rattenberg and ending in Innsbruck. The route was primarily rolling, except for a climb of 5 kilometres (3.1 miles) between Fritzens and Gnadenwald, with an average 7.1% gradient and maximum of 14% in places.

== Qualification ==
All National Federations were allowed to enter four riders for the race, with a maximum of two riders to start. In addition to this number, the outgoing World Champion and the current continental champions were also able to take part.

| Champion | Name | Note |
|---|---|---|
| Outgoing world champion | Tom Dumoulin (NED) | Competed |
| European champion | Victor Campenaerts (BEL) | Competed |
| Oceanian champion | Hamish Bond (NZL) | Competed |
| African champion | Mekseb Debesay (ERI) | Entered, but did not start |
| Asian champion | Cheung King Lok (HKG) | Did not compete |
| Pan American champion | Walter Vargas (COL) | Did not compete |

=== Participating nations ===
61 cyclists from 40 nations were scheduled to take part in the men's time trial. However, five riders – Eritrea's Mekseb Debesay and Daniel Teklehaimanot, Pakistan's Arsalan Anjum Muhammad and Najeeb Ullah and Eugert Zhupa from Albania – did not start, therefore reducing the event to 56 competitors from 37 nations. The number of cyclists per nation is shown in parentheses.

- Albania (~~1~~)
- Argentina (1)
- Australia (1)
- Austria (2)
- Belarus (1)
- Belgium (2)
- Canada (1)
- Colombia (1)
- Czech Republic (2)
- Denmark (2)
- Eritrea (~~2~~)
- Estonia (1)
- Ethiopia (1)
- France (2)
- Germany (2)
- Great Britain (2)
- Hong Kong (1)
- Indonesia (1)
- Ireland (2)
- Italy (2)
- Kazakhstan (1)
- Latvia (1)
- Lithuania (2)
- Luxembourg (1)
- Netherlands (3)
- New Zealand (2)
- Norway (1)
- Pakistan (~~2~~)
- Poland (2)
- Portugal (2)
- Russia (2)
- Slovakia (1)
- Slovenia (1)
- Spain (2)
- Sweden (1)
- Switzerland (2)
- Syria (1)
- Ukraine (1)
- United States (2)
- British Virgin Islands (1)

== Final classification ==
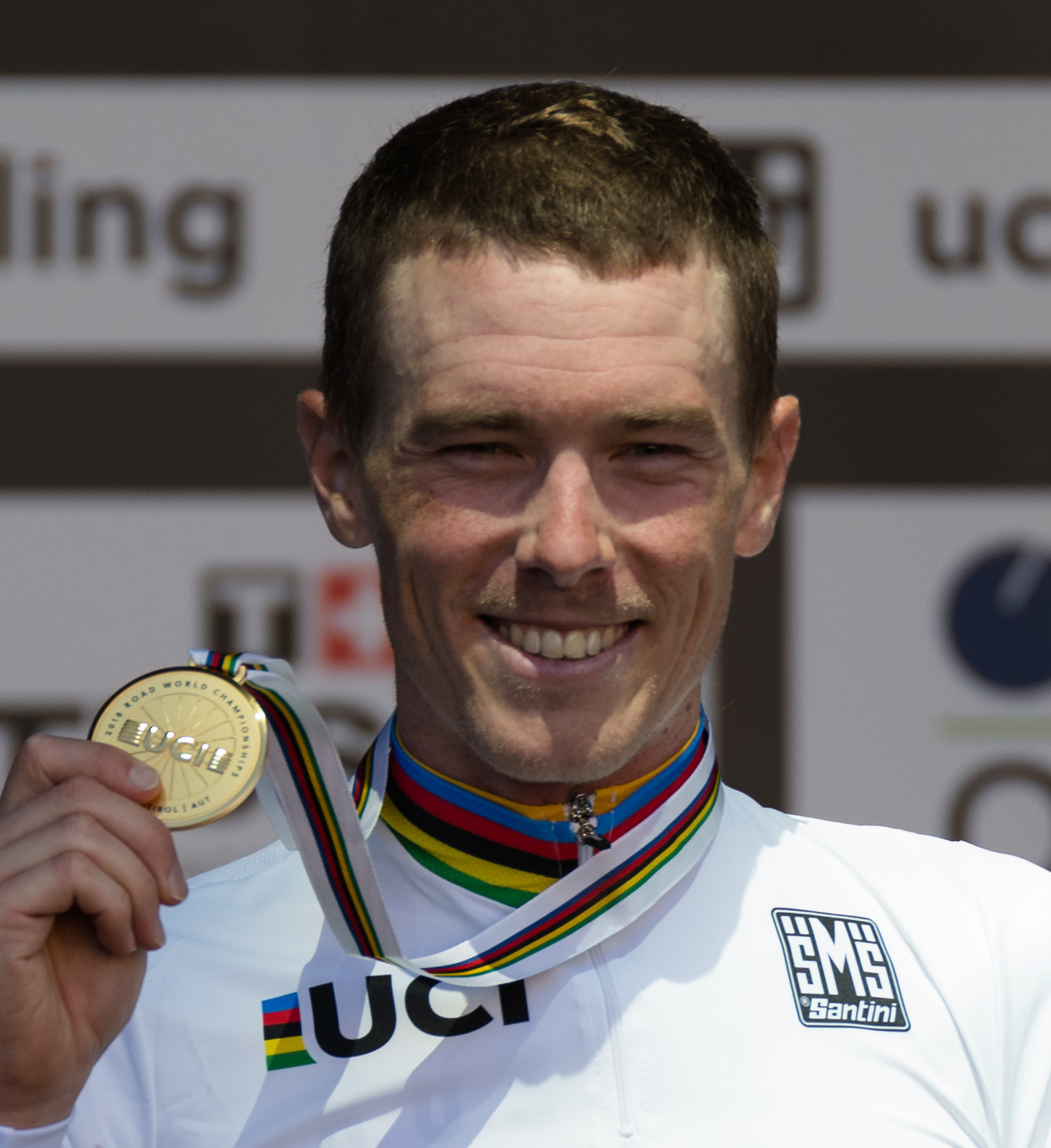
Gold medallist Rohan Dennis on the podium

All 56 race starters completed the 52.1-kilometre (32.4 mi)-long course.

| Rank | Rider | Time |
|---|---|---|
| 1 | (Australia) Rohan Dennis (AUS) | 1h 03' 02.57" |
| 2 | (Netherlands) Tom Dumoulin (NED) | + 1' 21.09" |
| 3 | (Belgium) Victor Campenaerts (BEL) | + 1' 21.62" |
| 4 | (Poland) Michał Kwiatkowski (POL) | + 2' 04.58" |
| 5 | (Portugal) Nelson Oliveira (POR) | + 2' 14.34" |
| 6 | (Spain) Jonathan Castroviejo (ESP) | + 2' 17.53" |
| 7 | (Germany) Tony Martin (GER) | + 2' 25.23" |
| 8 | (New Zealand) Patrick Bevin (NZL) | + 2' 34.78" |
| 9 | (Belarus) Vasil Kiryienka (BLR) | + 3' 07.54" |
| 10 | (Denmark) Martin Toft Madsen (DEN) | + 3' 23.39" |
| 11 | (Germany) Maximilian Schachmann (GER) | + 3' 39.95" |
| 12 | (Switzerland) Stefan Küng (SUI) | + 3' 44.23" |
| 13 | (Kazakhstan) Alexey Lutsenko (KAZ) | + 4' 07.98" |
| 14 | (Czech Republic) Jan Bárta (CZE) | + 4' 08.15" |
| 15 | (United States) Joey Rosskopf (USA) | + 4' 20.09" |
| 16 | (Netherlands) Wilco Kelderman (NED) | + 4' 21.09" |
| 17 | (Poland) Maciej Bodnar (POL) | + 4' 22.47" |
| 18 | (Denmark) Søren Kragh Andersen (DEN) | + 4' 28.86" |
| 19 | (Netherlands) Jos van Emden (NED) | + 4' 33.61" |
| 20 | (France) Benjamin Thomas (FRA) | + 4' 44.96" |
| 21 | (Estonia) Tanel Kangert (EST) | + 4' 45.14" |
| 22 | (Spain) Marc Soler (ESP) | + 4' 47.78" |
| 23 | (Luxembourg) Bob Jungels (LUX) | + 4' 47.94" |
| 24 | (Czech Republic) Josef Černý (CZE) | + 4' 49.29" |
| 25 | (New Zealand) Hamish Bond (NZL) | + 4' 50.45" |
| 26 | (Austria) Matthias Brändle (AUT) | + 4' 51.20" |
| 27 | (United States) Tejay van Garderen (USA) | + 4' 53.58" |
| 28 | (Italy) Alessandro De Marchi (ITA) | + 5' 05.54" |
| 29 | (United Kingdom) Alex Dowsett (GBR) | + 5' 24.70" |
| 30 | (Italy) Fabio Felline (ITA) | + 5' 25.71" |
| 31 | (Slovenia) Jan Tratnik (SLO) | + 5' 38.14" |
| 32 | (Canada) Hugo Houle (CAN) | + 5' 39.52" |
| 33 | (Russia) Pavel Sivakov (RUS) | + 5' 49.99" |
| 34 | (France) Yoann Paillot (FRA) | + 5' 57.58" |
| 35 | (United Kingdom) Tao Geoghegan Hart (GBR) | + 6' 03.37" |
| 36 | (Austria) Georg Preidler (AUT) | + 6' 12.60" |
| 37 | (Colombia) Rodrigo Contreras (COL) | + 6' 20.28" |
| 38 | (Ukraine) Andriy Hrivko (UKR) | + 6' 22.11" |
| 39 | (Ethiopia) Tsgabu Grmay (ETH) | + 6' 23.36" |
| 40 | (Norway) Kristoffer Skjerping (NOR) | + 6' 24.48" |
| 41 | (Portugal) Domingos Gonçalves (POR) | + 6' 29.11" |
| 42 | (Russia) Anton Vorobyev (RUS) | + 6' 34.19" |
| 43 | (Lithuania) Ignatas Konovalovas (LTU) | + 6' 47.52" |
| 44 | (Latvia) Toms Skujiņš (LAT) | + 6' 47.80" |
| 45 | (Argentina) Eduardo Sepúlveda (ARG) | + 6' 49.23" |
| 46 | (Republic of Ireland) Nicolas Roche (IRL) | + 7' 03.69" |
| 47 | (Switzerland) Silvan Dillier (SUI) | + 7' 03.85" |
| 48 | (Sweden) Tobias Ludvigsson (SWE) | + 7' 05.22" |
| 49 | (Republic of Ireland) Ryan Mullen (IRL) | + 7' 17.92" |
| 50 | (Belgium) Laurens De Plus (BEL) | + 8' 14.20" |
| 51 | (Lithuania) Gediminas Bagdonas (LTU) | + 8' 16.52" |
| 52 | (Slovakia) Marek Čanecký (SVK) | + 10' 50. 19" |
| 53 | (Syria) Ahmad Wais (SYR) | + 15' 30.45" |
| 54 | (Indonesia) Dealton Prayogo (INA) | + 17' 33.55" |
| 55 | (Hong Kong) Chiu Ho San (HKG) | + 18' 05.50" |
| 56 | (British Virgin Islands) Darel Christopher Jr. (BVI) | + 28' 41.30" |
| | (Eritrea) Mekseb Debesay (ERI) | DNS |
| | (Eritrea) Daniel Teklehaimanot (ERI) | DNS |
| | (Pakistan) Arsalan Anjum Muhammad (PAK) | DNS |
| | (Albania) Eugert Zhupa (ALB) | DNS |
| | (Pakistan) Najeeb Ullah (PAK) | DNS |
