= Nelson Oliveira (cyclist) =

Portuguese racing cyclist

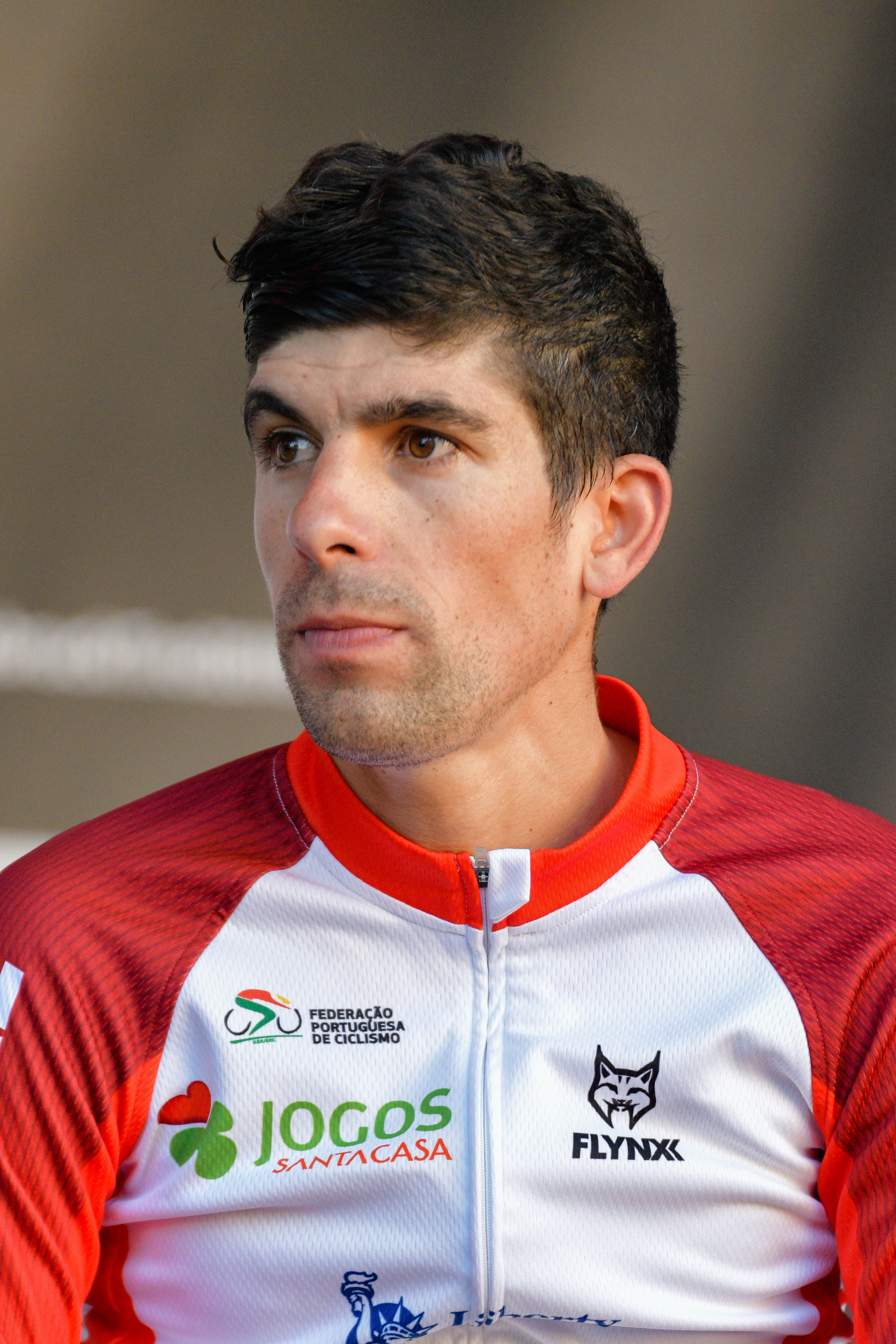
- Oliveira in 2018

Personal information
- Full name: Nelson Filipe dos Santos Simões Oliveira
- Born: 6 March 1989 (age 37) Anadia, Portugal
- Height: 1.80 m (5 ft 11 in)
- Weight: 67 kg (148 lb)

Cycling career
- Sport: Cycling
- Current team: Movistar Team
- Discipline: Road
- Role: Rider
- Rider type: Time trialist

Professional teams
- 2010: Xacobeo–Galicia
- 2011: Team RadioShack
- 2012–2013: RadioShack–Nissan
- 2014–2015: Lampre–Merida
- 2016–: Movistar Team

Major wins
- Grand Tours Vuelta a España 1 individual stage (2015) One-day races and Classics National Road Race Championships (2014) National Time Trial Championships (2011, 2014–2016)
Medal record
Representing Portugal
Men's road bicycle racing
World Championships
Silver medal – second place	2009 Mendrisio	Under-23 time trial
European Games
Silver medal – second place	2019 Minsk	Time trial
European Championships
Silver medal – second place	2010 Ankara	Under-23 road race
Bronze medal – third place	2010 Ankara	Under-23 time trial
Representing Movistar Team

Nelson Filipe dos Santos Simões Oliveira (born 6 March 1989) is a Portuguese professional road racing cyclist who currently rides for UCI WorldTeam Movistar Team.

== Career ==
In September 2009, Anadia-born Oliveira won the silver medal in the under-23 time trial at the UCI Road World Championships. In November 2009, Oliveira signed with Xacobeo–Galicia.

In September 2010, he went again to the UCI Road World Championships, and was 4th in the under-23 time trial, not repeating a podium by just 4 seconds. In 2011 he won the Portuguese National Time Trial Championships and finished 17th in the UCI World Time Trial Championships. At the 2012 Summer Olympics, he competed in the men's road race and the men's individual time trial.

Oliveira left RadioShack–Leopard at the end of the 2013 season, and joined Lampre–Merida for the 2014 season. In 2014, he won the Portuguese National Time Trial Championships again. He also won the Portuguese National Road Race Championships several days later. In September 2015 it was reported that Oliveira would leave Lampre–Merida and join Movistar Team for 2016. At the 2016 Summer Olympics, he competed in the road race and the men's individual time trial.

== Major results ==
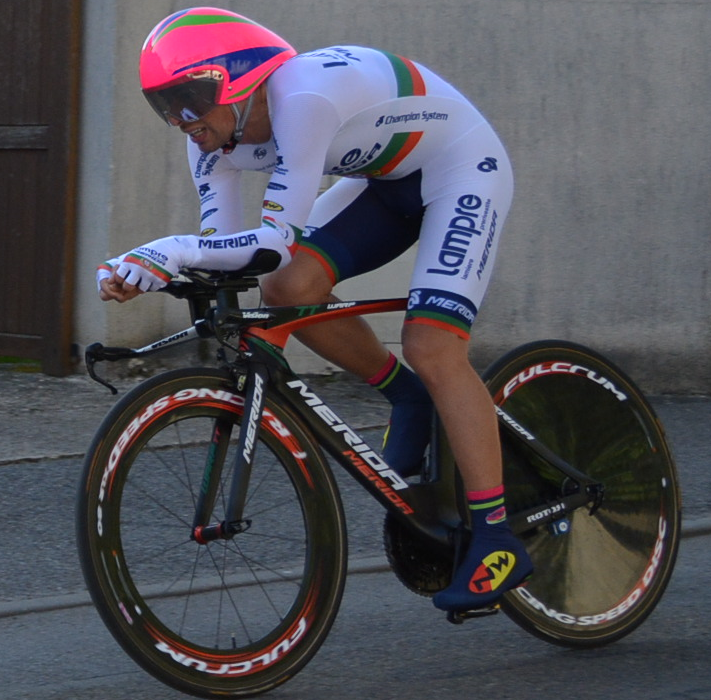
Oliveira at the 2015 Paris–Nice

2006
1st Time trial, National Junior Road Championships
2007
1st Stage 3a Vuelta Valladolid Juniors
7th Time trial, UEC European Junior Road Championships
2008
3rd Overall Volta a Madeira
2009
1st Time trial, National Under-23 Road Championships
2nd Time trial, UCI Under-23 Road World Championships
5th Overall Volta a Madeira

1st Stage 6

2010
1st Time trial, National Under-23 Road Championships
UEC European Under-23 Road Championships

2nd Road race
3rd Time trial

2nd Overall Grand Prix du Portugal
4th Time trial, UCI Under-23 Road World Championships
6th Overall Bayern Rundfahrt
6th Overall Giro delle Regioni
2011 (1 pro win)
1st Time trial, National Road Championships
2012
1st Mountains classification, Ster ZLM Toer
3rd Overall Circuit de la Sarthe
2014 (2)
National Road Championships

1st Time trial
1st Road race

7th Time trial, UCI Road World Championships
2015 (2)
1st Time trial, National Road Championships
1st Stage 13 Vuelta a España
5th Chrono des Nations
2016 (1)
National Road Championships

1st Time trial
2nd Road race

3rd Overall Tour du Poitou-Charentes
4th Time trial, UEC European Road Championships
7th Time trial, Olympic Games
2017
4th Time trial, UCI Road World Championships
2018
5th Time trial, UCI Road World Championships
10th Overall Volta ao Algarve
2019
European Games

2nd Time trial
10th Road race

6th Overall Vuelta a Castilla y León
6th Trofeo Serra de Tramuntana
8th Time trial, UCI Road World Championships
2020
6th Overall Vuelta a San Juan
2021
2nd Overall Volta a la Comunitat Valenciana
4th Time trial, National Road Championships
9th Overall Vuelta a Asturias
2022
8th Time trial, UCI Road World Championships
2023
6th Time trial, UCI Road World Championships
6th Time trial, UEC European Road Championships
2024
7th Time trial, Olympic Games

=== Grand Tour general classification results timeline ===
Grand Tour	2011	2012	2013	2014	2015	2016	2017	2018	2019	2020	2021	2022	2023	2024	2025	2026
Giro d'Italia	—	64	81	—	—	—	—	—	—	—	27	—	—	—	—	66
Tour de France	—	—	—	87	47	80	—	—	79	55	—	52	53	51	75	65
Vuelta a España	118	—	—	—	21	—	47	71	46	39	72	37	53	73	—	—

=== Major championships results timeline ===
Event		2011	2012	2013	2014	2015	2016	2017	2018	2019	2020	2021	2022	2023
Olympic Games	Road race	NH	69	Not held			DNF	Not held				41	Not held	
Olympic Games	Time trial	NH	18	Not held			7	Not held				21	Not held	
World Championships	Road race	122	—	—	67	16	DNF	55	39	DNF	38	55	44	46
World Championships	Time trial	17	—	15	7	13	20	4	5	8	11	13	8	6
European Championships	Road race	Race did not exist					—	—	—	—	—	28	—	
European Championships	Time trial	Race did not exist					4	—	—	—	—	—	—	
National Championships	Road race	—	—	—	1	14	2	—	—	17	—	15	—	—
National Championships	Time trial	1	—	—	1	1	1	—	—	—	—	4	—	—

Legend
—	Did not compete
DNF	Did not finish
NH	Not held
