= Alex Dowsett =

British racing cyclist (born 1988)

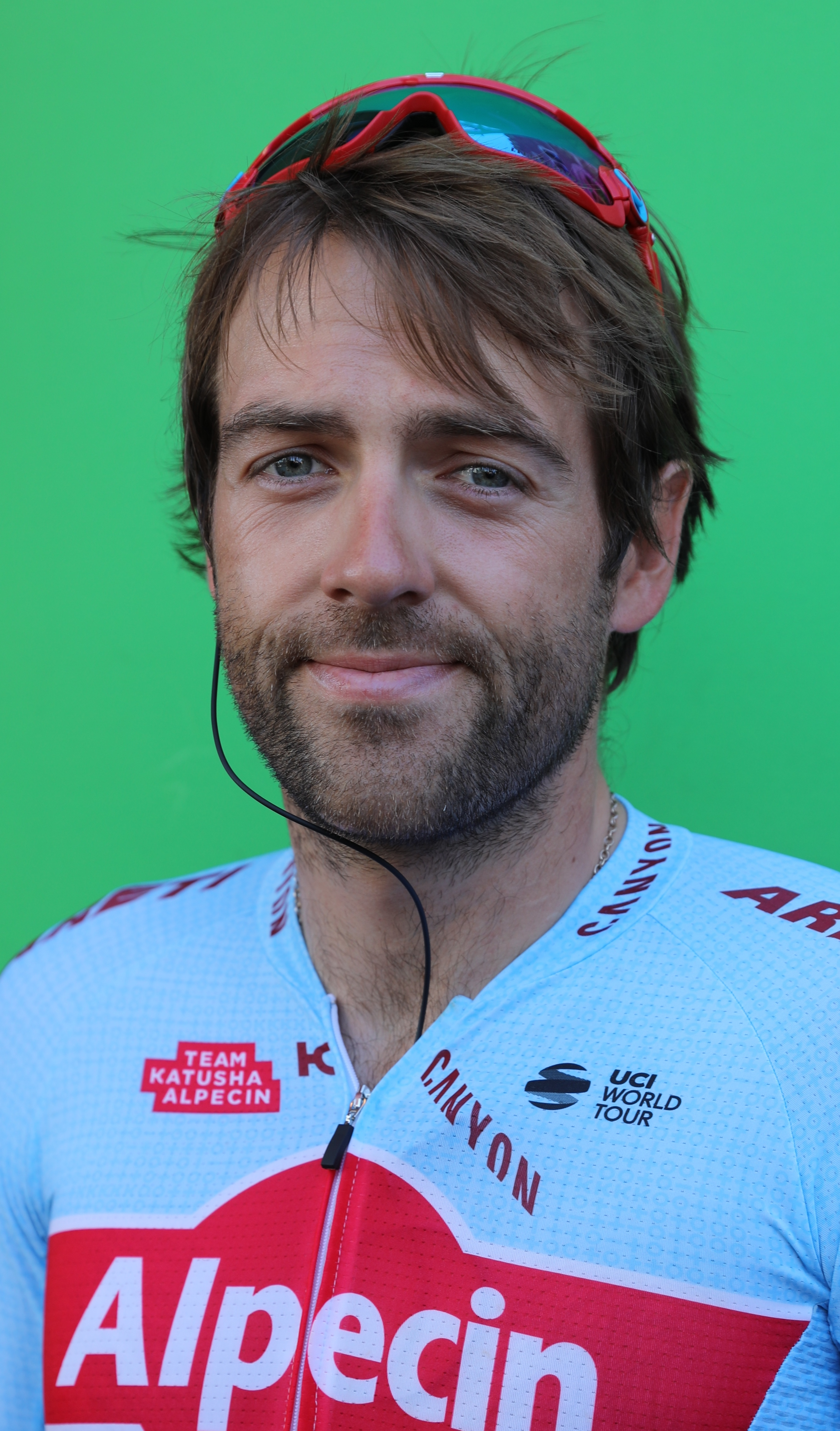
- Dowsett in 2019

Personal information
- Full name: Alex Edward Albert Dowsett
- Nickname: The Tiger
- Born: 3 October 1988 (age 38) Maldon, Essex, England
- Height: 1.82 m (6 ft 0 in)
- Weight: 73 kg (161 lb)

Cycling career
- Sport: Cycling
- Disciplines: Road; Track
- Role: Rider
- Rider type: Time trialist

Amateur team
- 2009: 100% Me

Professional teams
- 2010: Trek–Livestrong
- 2011–2012: Team Sky
- 2013–2017: Movistar Team
- 2018–2019: Team Katusha–Alpecin
- 2020–2022: Israel Start-Up Nation

Major wins
- Grand Tours Giro d'Italia 2 individual stages (2013, 2020) Stage races Bayern Rundfahrt (2015) One-day races and Classics National Time Trial Championships (2011–2013, 2015, 2016, 2019) World Hour record 2 May 2015, 52.937 km
Medal record
Representing Great Britain
European Road Championships
Gold medal – first place	2010 Ankara	Under-23 time trial
Representing England
Men's road bicycle racing
Commonwealth Games
Gold medal – first place	2014 Glasgow	Time trial
Silver medal – second place	2010 Delhi	Time trial
World Championships
Representing Movistar Team
Bronze medal – third place	2015 Richmond	Team time trial

Alex Edward Albert Dowsett (born 3 October 1988) is a British former professional road racing cyclist, who last rode for UCI WorldTeam NSN Cycling Team. He was a time trial specialist, and in 2015, he broke track cycling's world hour record by 446 metres (1,463 feet), with a distance of 52.937 kilometres (32.894 miles).

== Early life ==
The son of former British Touring Car Championship driver Phil Dowsett, Dowsett was educated at Elm Green Preparatory School in Little Baddow, followed by King Edward VI Grammar School, Chelmsford. He initially took up swimming as a sport, swimming up to five days a week, before starting cycling on a mountain bike along with his father.

== Career ==
=== Early career ===
Dowsett began his career at the Maldon and District Cycling Club in the City of Chelmsford. His talent was soon recognised and Dowsett became part of the British Olympic Academy development team. He won the under-23 version of the British Time Trial Championships in 2008 and 2009. In 2010, he rode for American Trek–Livestrong team and won the under-23 European time trial championship. He also won a silver medal in the Time Trial at the 2010 Commonwealth Games.

=== Team Sky (2011–12) ===
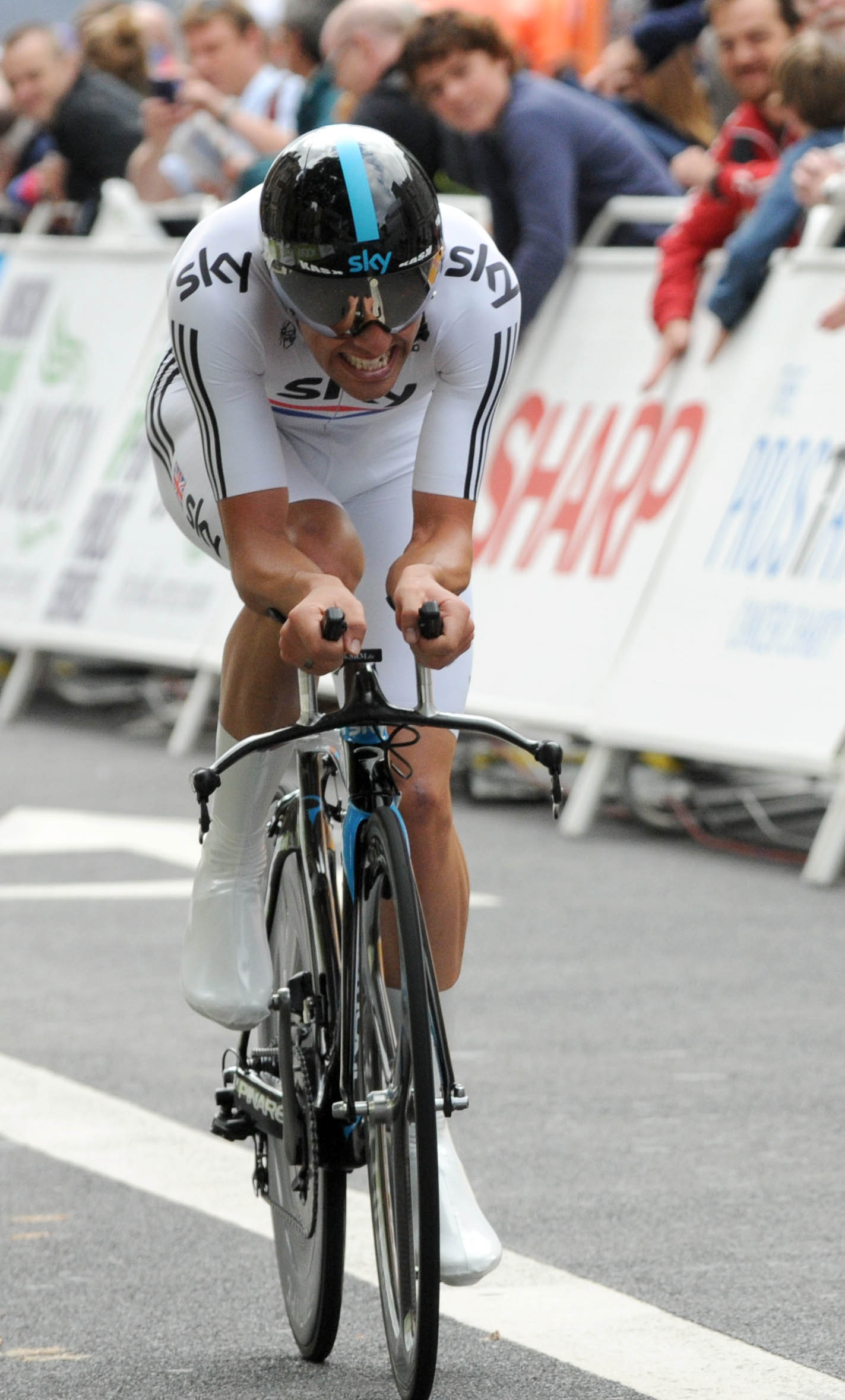
Dowsett at the 2011 Tour of Britain

Dowsett signed for British-based Team Sky as a neo-pro for the 2011 season. His first victory for Sky came in the London Nocturne event. Dowsett finished fifth overall in the Danmark Rundt, helping teammate Simon Gerrans to overall victory. He won the fifth stage of the Tour du Poitou-Charentes to finish second overall. In September, he won the British National Time Trial Championships. Dowsett won the Stage 8a time trial of the Tour of Britain.

In March 2012, Dowsett broke his elbow in the Three Days of De Panne and as a result missed the classics season. Dowsett recovered to finish second in the National Road Race Championships, and later retained his National Time Trial Championships title. Later in September, Dowsett competed at the UCI World Road Race Championships in all three men's elite events, with a best placing of eighth in the individual time trial.

=== Movistar Team (2013–17) ===
On 30 October 2012, Dowsett signed with the Spanish Movistar Team for the 2013 season hoping to gain a ride at a Grand Tour. After competing in the Classics season for Movistar Team, Dowsett was selected to ride the Giro d'Italia, his first Grand Tour appearance. Dowsett helped Movistar Team take second place in the team time trial on stage two. On stage eight, a 54.8 km (34.1 mi) individual time trial, Dowsett set the fastest time to record his biggest career victory to date, setting a time ten seconds faster than the second placed Bradley Wiggins. In June, Dowsett won the British National Time Trial Championships for the third year in a row despite crashing early on in the course.

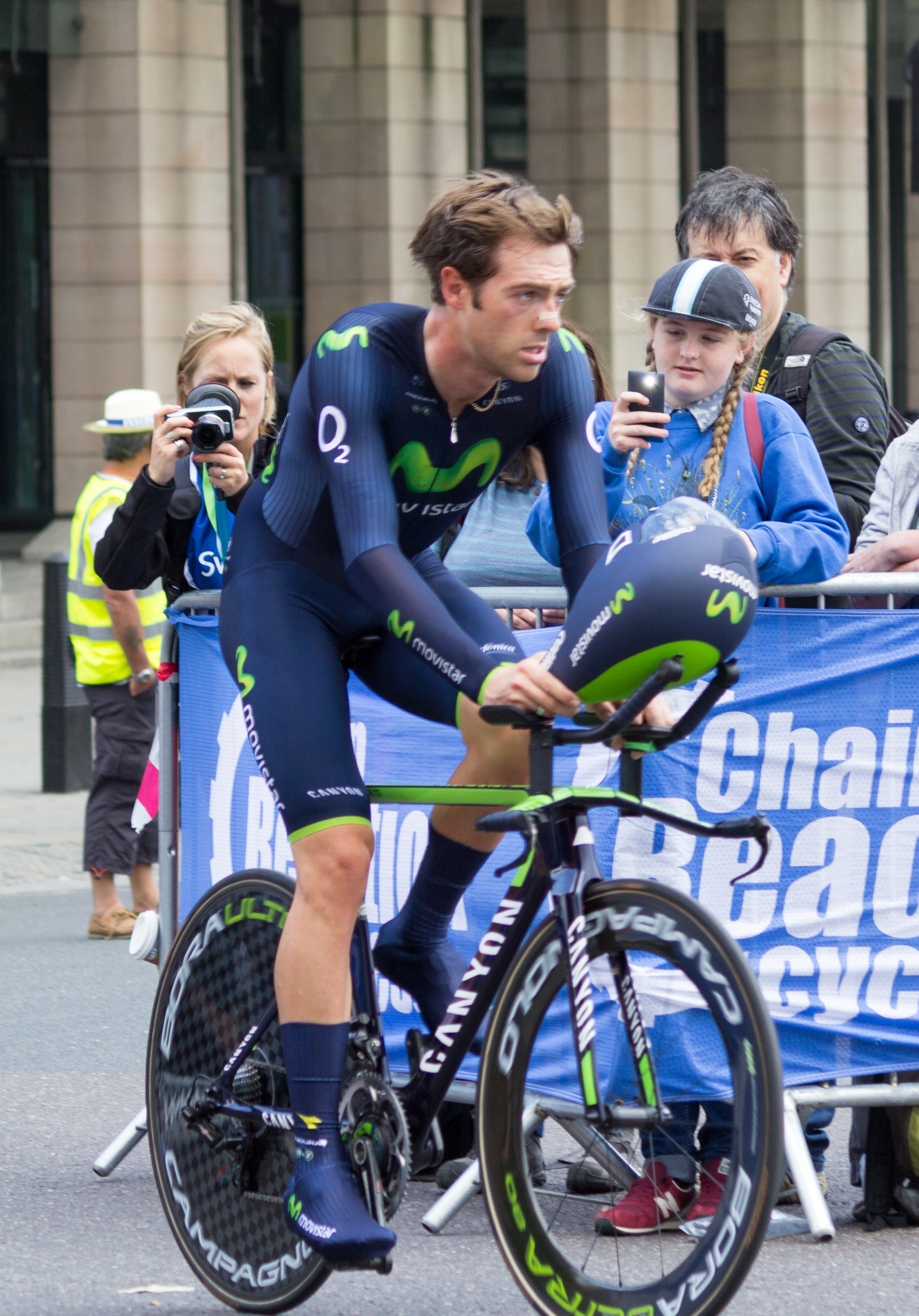
Dowsett at the 2014 Tour of Britain

In May 2014 Dowsett set a new British 10-mile time trial record in Cambridgeshire, clocking in at 17 minutes 20 seconds and beating Michael Hutchinson's previous record by 25 seconds. Competing for England at the 2014 Commonwealth Games, Dowsett won gold in the Individual Time Trial. After a long breakaway, Dowsett took the lead of the Tour of Britain on the sixth stage but lost it before the end of the race to Dylan van Baarle and finished eighth overall. His team announced that Dowsett had signed a three-year contract extension with them in September.

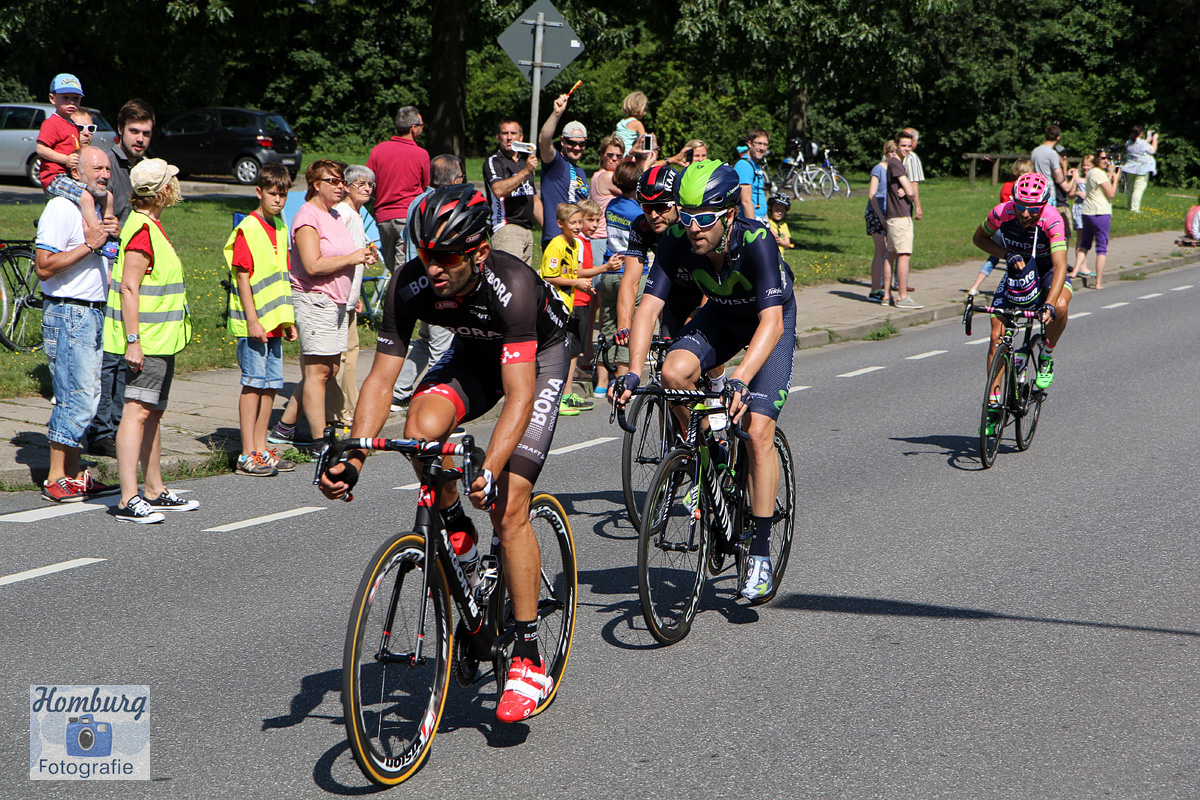
Dowsett (centre) in the leading group of the 2015 Vattenfall Cyclassics

In December 2014, Dowsett announced he would attempt to break the UCI Hour Record at the Lee Valley VeloPark on 27 February 2015. However, he was forced to postpone the attempt after breaking his collarbone in a training accident. The attempt instead took place at the Manchester Velodrome on 2 May 2015 where Dowsett set a new world record of 52.937 kilometres (32.894 miles), beating Rohan Dennis' previous record by almost half a kilometre. Two weeks later, Dowsett won his first ever stage race, the Bayern Rundfahrt, where he claimed the overall victory a day after winning the Stage 4 individual time-trial. In June 2015 Dowsett clinched his fourth national time trial title. He was selected for the 2015 Tour de France but was forced abandon the race halfway round due to an injury.

=== Team Katusha–Alpecin (2018–19) ===
In August 2017, it was announced that Dowsett would join Team Katusha–Alpecin for the 2018 season. Following the last minute break up of the team in 2019, he initially thought he would rest from professional cycling in 2020 and return to his local Maldon club, to focus on the Olympics and regaining the hour record.

=== Israel Start-Up Nation (2020–22) ===
Instead of his initial sabbatical from professional cycling, Dowsett was part of the Team Katusha–Alpecin merger with Israel Cycling Academy, which became the new team Israel Start-Up Nation for 2020. He placed fourth in the time trial at the European Road Championships, and ninth in the time trial at the UCI Road World Championships. Following this, Dowsett contested the Giro d'Italia and won the eighth stage from a six-rider breakaway, soloing to victory from 18 kilometres (11 miles) remaining. In November, he extended his contract with Israel Start-Up Nation for a further two years. Michael Hutchinson coaches Dowsett. In 2021, Dowsett attempted the UCI Hour Record, and completed a distance of 54.555 kilometres (33.899 miles), at the time the third furthest in the modern history of the Hour Record.

In August 2022, Dowsett announced that he would be retiring from professional cycling at the end of the season.

== Personal life ==
Dowsett has haemophilia and wears a necklace, detailing his medical needs, when out riding. Speaking on ITV's Cycle Show in July 2013, Dowsett cited this medical condition as being a key factor in his choosing competitive cycling in his youth, above other sports, because contact games such as football and rugby were considered too risky. His mother inserted knee and shoulder pads into his school uniform and he wore special trainers.

He is believed to be the only able-bodied elite sportsman or woman with the condition. As a result, he has a special exemption from the Union Cycliste Internationale's no needles policy, introduced in 2011, to inject himself with the clotting protein Factor VIII every 48 hours.

Dowsett started the charitable foundation Little Bleeders to raise awareness of haemophilia and to encourage and support young haemophiliacs to engage with sport. He also has his own YouTube channel, where he documents his life as a professional cyclist.

== Major results ==
2005
1st Time trial, National Junior Road Championships
1st Overall Junior Tour of Wales

1st Mountains classification

2006
1st Team pursuit, UEC European Junior Track Championships
1st Time trial, National Junior Road Championships
3rd Overall Junior Tour of Wales

1st Mountains classification

2007
6th Rutland–Melton CiCLE Classic
2008
National Under-23 Road Championships

1st Time trial
4th Road race

1st Prologue (TTT) Tour Alsace
2009
1st Time trial, National Under-23 Road Championships
1st Richmond Grand Prix
7th Time trial, UCI Under-23 Road World Championships
2010
1st Time trial, UEC European Under-23 Road Championships
1st Chrono des Nations Espoirs
1st Stage 5 Cascade Cycling Classic
2nd Time trial, Commonwealth Games
8th Tour of the Battenkill
2011
1st Time trial, National Road Championships
1st London Nocturne
1st Stage 8a (ITT) Tour of Britain
2nd Overall Tour du Poitou-Charentes

1st Stage 5

3rd Chrono des Nations
5th Overall Danmark Rundt
6th Overall Ster ZLM Toer
2012
National Road Championships

1st Time trial
2nd Road race

2nd Duo Normand (with Luke Rowe)
8th Time trial, UCI Road World Championships
2013
1st Time trial, National Road Championships
1st Stage 8 (ITT) Giro d'Italia
2nd London Nocturne
2014
1st Time trial, Commonwealth Games
1st Stage 3 (ITT) Circuit de la Sarthe
2nd Madison, National Track Championships (with Joe Holt)
3rd Time trial, National Road Championships
7th Overall Tour du Poitou-Charentes
8th Overall Tour of Britain
2015
Hour record: 52.937 km
1st Time trial, National Road Championships
1st Overall Bayern Rundfahrt

1st Stage 4 (ITT)

3rd Team time trial, UCI Road World Championships
2016
1st Time trial, National Road Championships
1st Stage 7 (ITT) Tour de Pologne
2017
1st Stage 2b (ITT) Circuit de la Sarthe
2nd Time trial, National Road Championships
10th Overall Dubai Tour
2018
3rd Time trial, National Road Championships
5th Time trial, UEC European Road Championships
2019
National Road Championships

1st Time trial
4th Road race

5th Time trial, UCI Road World Championships
5th Time trial, UEC European Road Championships
10th Overall ZLM Tour
2020
1st Stage 8 Giro d'Italia
4th Time trial, UEC European Road Championships
9th Time trial, UCI Road World Championships
2021
1st Stage 1b (TTT) Settimana Internazionale di Coppi e Bartali

=== Grand Tour general classification results timeline ===
Grand Tour	2013	2014	2015	2016	2017	2018	2019	2020	2021	2022
Giro d'Italia	147	—	—	—	—	120	—	120	DNF	134
Tour de France	—	—	DNF	—	—	—	151	—	—	—
Vuelta a España	Did not contest during his career									

=== Championship results timeline ===
Event		2012	2013	2014	2015	2016	2017	2018	2019	2020	2021
World Championships	Road race	DNF	—	—	DNF	—	—	—	—	—	—
World Championships	Time trial	8	41	20	17	12	—	29	5	9	—
World Championships	Team time trial	9	—	6	3	6	6	11	Race did not exist		
World Championships	Mixed team relay	Race did not exist							—	NH	5
European Championships	Time trial	Event did not exist				—	—	5	5	4	—
European Championships	Road race	Event did not exist				—	—	—	DNF	DNF	—

Legend
—	Did not compete
DNF	Did not finish
NH	Not held

Records
Preceded by Rohan Dennis	UCI hour record (52.937 km); 2 May 2015 – 7 June 2015	Succeeded by Bradley Wiggins
