= 2013 UCI Road World Championships – Men's time trial =

Men's time trial
2013 UCI Road World Championships
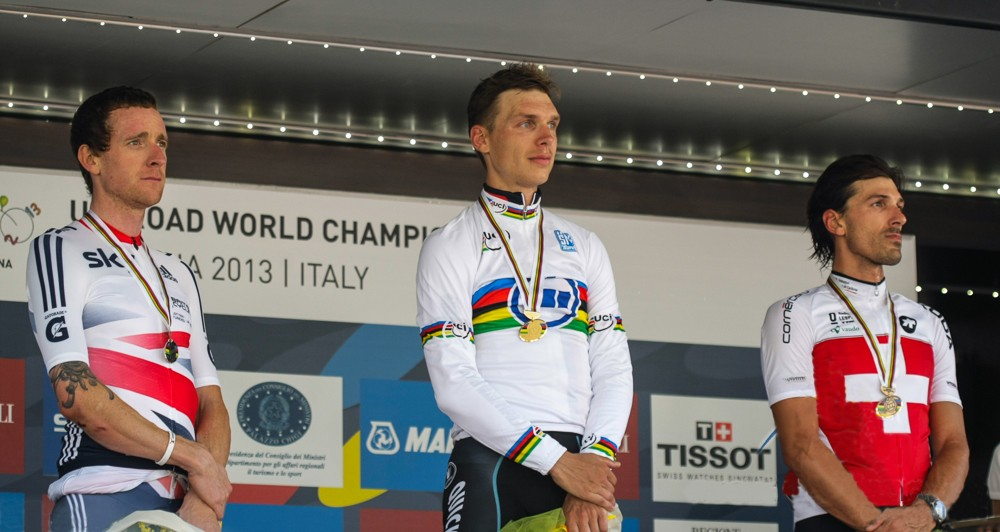
- Podium of the Men's time trial

Race details
- Dates: 25 September 2013
- Stages: 1
- Distance: 57.9 km (35.98 mi)
- Winning time: 1h 05' 36.35"

Medalists
	Gold	Tony Martin (Germany)
	Silver	Bradley Wiggins (United Kingdom)
	Bronze	Fabian Cancellara (Switzerland)

The Men's time trial of the 2013 UCI Road World Championships was a cycling event scheduled that take place on 25 September 2013 in the region of Tuscany, Italy.

The course of the race was 57.9 km from Montecatini Terme to the Nelson Mandela Forum in Florence. German rider Tony Martin was the defending champion and he retained his title.

== Final classification ==
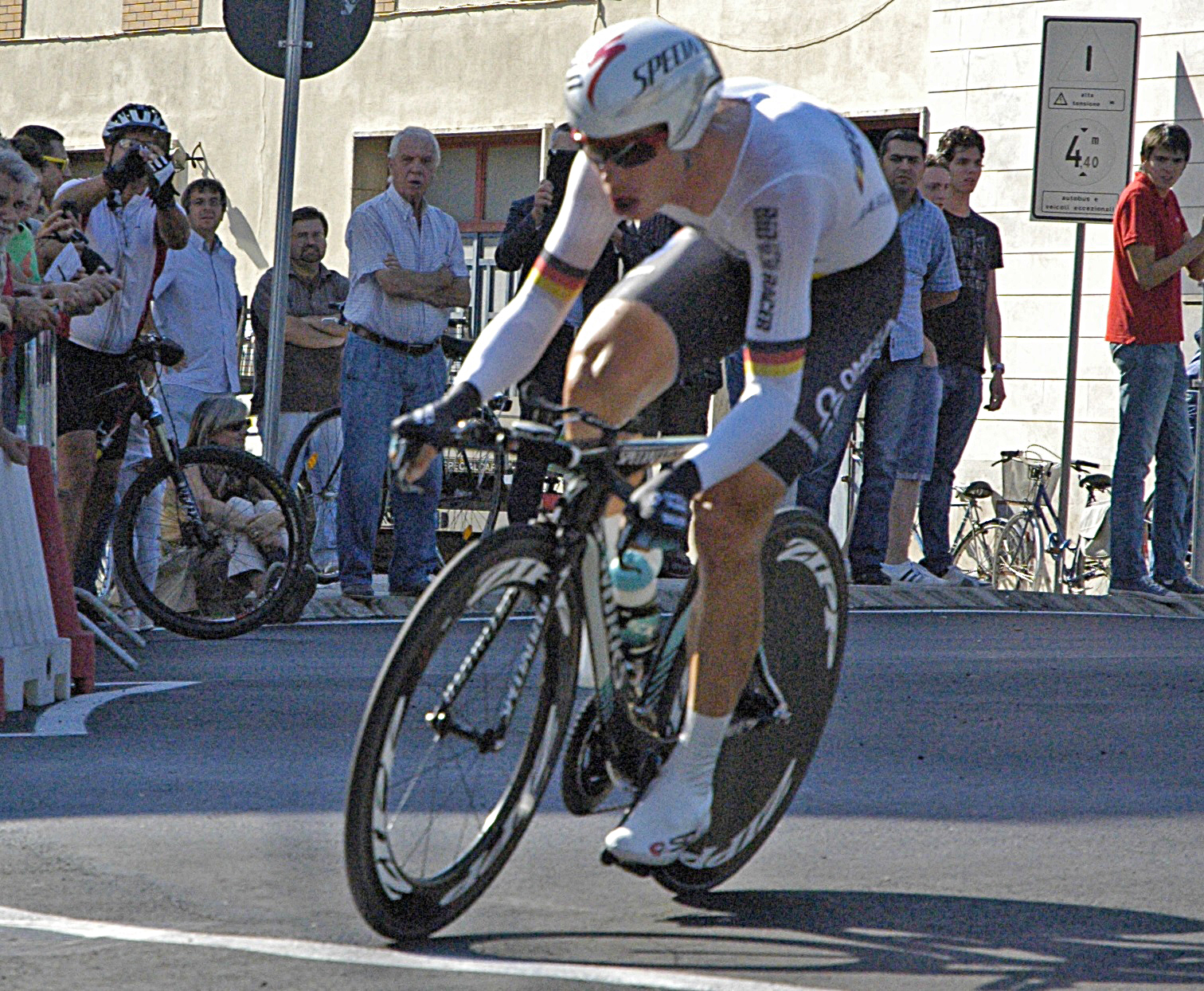
Tony Martin won gold.

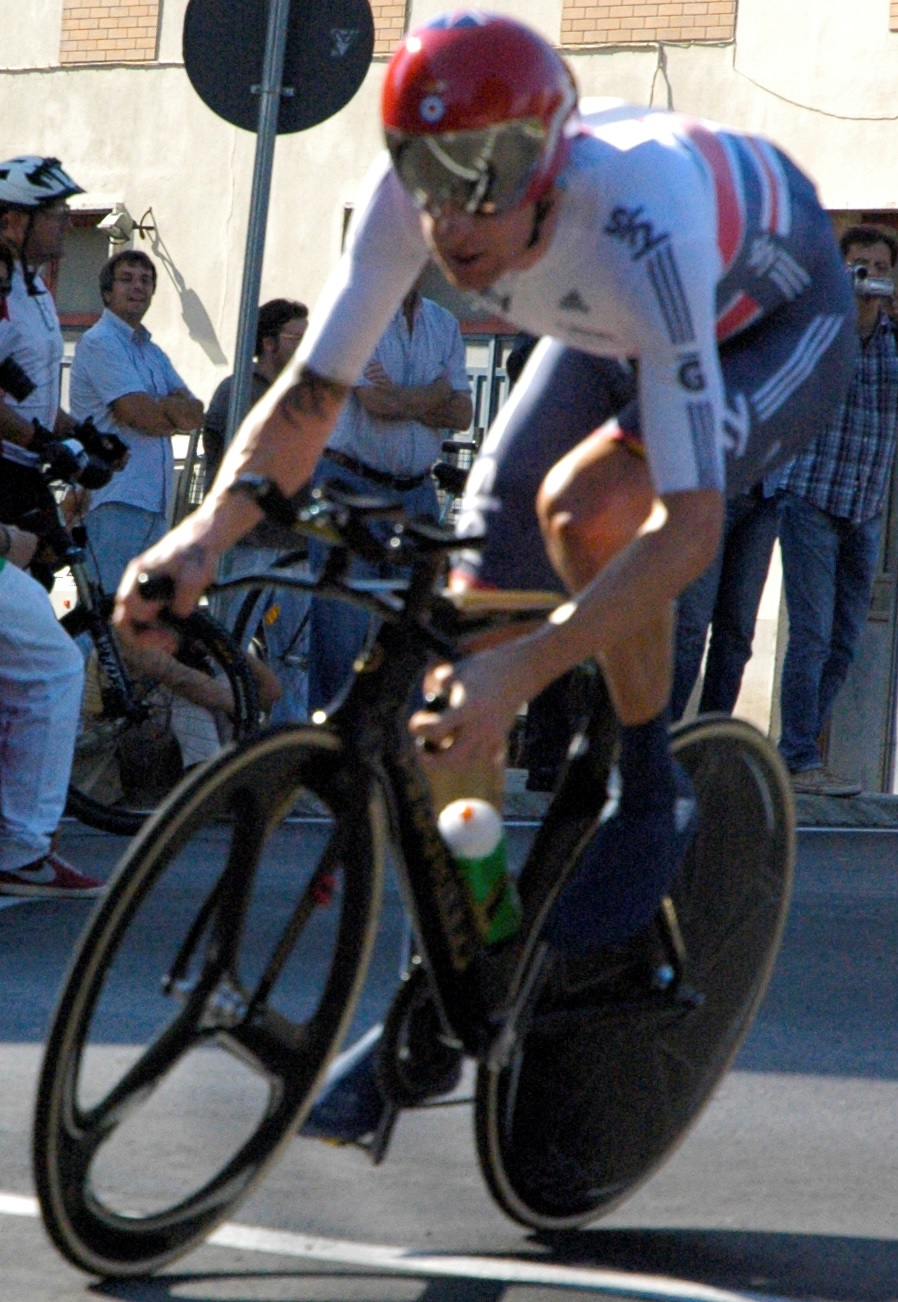
Bradley Wiggins won silver.

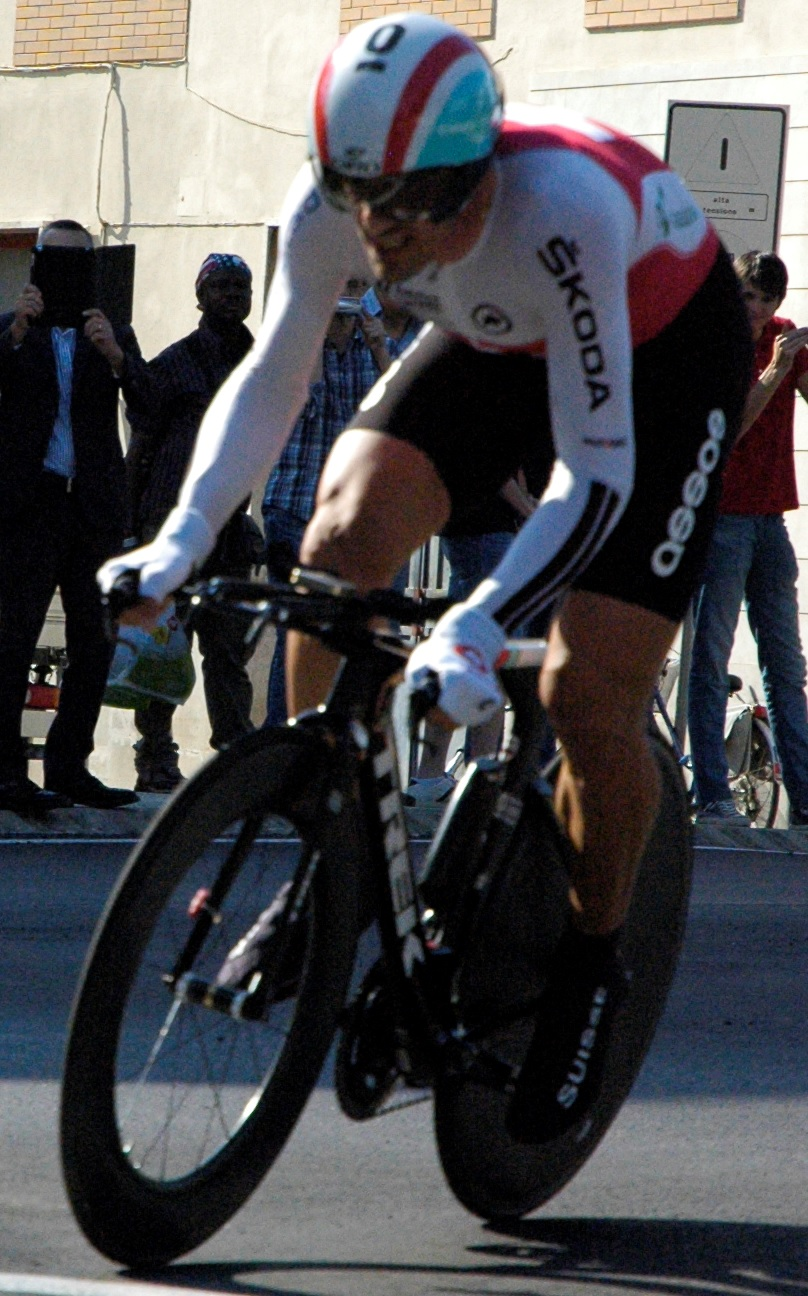
Fabian Cancellara won bronze.

Rank	Rider	Time
1	(Germany) Tony Martin (GER)	1h 05' 36.35"
2	(United Kingdom) Bradley Wiggins (GBR)	+ 46.09"
3	(Switzerland) Fabian Cancellara (SUI)	+ 48.34"
4	(Belarus) Vasil Kiryienka (BLR)	+ 1' 26.01"
5	(United States) Taylor Phinney (USA)	+ 2' 08.00"
6	(Denmark) Rasmus Quaade (DEN)	+ 2' 36.33"
7	(Italy) Marco Pinotti (ITA)	+ 2' 41.92"
8	(Italy) Adriano Malori (ITA)	+ 2' 51.07"
9	(Sweden) Gustav Larsson (SWE)	+ 2' 58.47"
10	(Belarus) Kanstantsin Sivtsov (BLR)	+ 2' 59.54"
11	(Czech Republic) Jan Bárta (CZE)	+ 3' 07.00"
12	(Australia) Rohan Dennis (AUS)	+ 3' 09.33"
13	(Republic of Ireland) Nicolas Roche (IRL)	+ 3' 13.35"
14	(Spain) Jonathan Castroviejo (ESP)	+ 3' 13.78"
15	(Portugal) Nelson Oliveira (POR)	+ 3' 14.43"
16	(Belgium) Kristof Vandewalle (BEL)	+ 3' 17.15"
17	(Australia) Richie Porte (AUS)	+ 3' 22.82"
18	(Russia) Vladimir Gusev (RUS)	+ 3' 28.46"
19	(Kazakhstan) Dmitriy Gruzdev (KAZ)	+ 3' 35.95"
20	(Germany) Bert Grabsch (GER)	+ 3' 41.01"
21	(New Zealand) Jesse Sergent (NZL)	+ 3' 45.91"
22	(France) Sylvain Chavanel (FRA)	+ 3' 48.41"
23	(Latvia) Aleksejs Saramotins (LAT)	+ 3' 56.32"
24	(Poland) Michał Kwiatkowski (POL)	+ 3' 59.07"
25	(Netherlands) Niki Terpstra (NED)	+ 4' 00.83"
26	(Chile) Carlos Oyarzun (CHI)	+ 4' 06.45"
27	(Netherlands) Lieuwe Westra (NED)	+ 4' 06.54"
28	(Poland) Maciej Bodnar (POL)	+ 4' 18.20"
29	(France) Jérémy Roy (FRA)	+ 4' 27.21"
30	(Austria) Riccardo Zoidl (AUT)	+ 4' 39.57"
31	(Moldova) Serghei Tvetcov (MDA)	+ 4' 47.33"
32	(Lithuania) Ignatas Konovalovas (LTU)	+ 4' 49.80"
33	(Luxembourg) Bob Jungels (LUX)	+ 4' 58.57"
34	(Bulgaria) Nikolay Mihaylov (BUL)	+ 4' 59.10"
35	(Spain) Luis León Sánchez (ESP)	+ 5' 04.78"
36	(Sweden) Tobias Ludvigsson (SWE)	+ 5' 07.12"
37	(Austria) Matthias Brändle (AUT)	+ 5' 11.12"
38	(Germany) Patrick Gretsch (GER)	+ 5' 14.23"
39	(Portugal) Tiago Machado (POR)	+ 5' 28.63"
40	(Russia) Ilnur Zakarin (RUS)	+ 5' 34.37"
41	(United Kingdom) Alex Dowsett (GBR)	+ 5' 47.23"
42	(South Africa) Reinardt Janse van Rensburg (RSA)	+ 5' 52.74"
43	(Denmark) Alex Rasmussen (DEN)	+ 5' 56.91"
44	(Greece) Ioannis Tamouridis (GRE)	+ 6' 00.00"
45	(Ukraine) Andriy Vasylyuk (UKR)	+ 6' 04.45"
46	(United States) Andrew Talansky (USA)	+ 6' 05.19"
47	(Slovakia) Matej Jurčo (SVK)	+ 6' 15.31"
48	(Kazakhstan) Alexey Lutsenko (KAZ)	+ 6' 19.04"
49	(Belgium) Thomas De Gendt (BEL)	+ 6' 25.48"
50	(Slovenia) Kristijan Koren (SLO)	+ 6' 25.55"
51	(Switzerland) Reto Hollenstein (SUI)	+ 6' 26.12"
52	(Tunisia) Rafaa Chitoui (TUN)	+ 6' 30.86"
53	(Estonia) Gert Jõeäär (EST)	+ 6' 49.14"
54	(Eritrea) Daniel Teklehaymanot (ERI)	+ 6' 49.28"
55	(South Africa) Jay Thomson (RSA)	+ 6' 52.88"
56	(New Zealand) Sam Bewley (NZL)	+ 7' 00.02"
57	(Hong Kong) Cheung King Lok (HKG)	+ 7' 01.57"
58	(Argentina) Leandro Messineo (ARG)	+ 7' 23.33"
59	(Lithuania) Gediminas Bagdonas (LTU)	+ 7' 38.30"
60	(South Korea) Choe Hyeong-min (KOR)	+ 7' 44.62"
61	(Ukraine) Mykhaylo Kononenko (UKR)	+ 7' 46.86"
62	(Uzbekistan) Muradjan Khalmuratov (UZB)	+ 7' 51.74"
63	(Bulgaria) Spas Gyurov (BUL)	+ 7' 56.99"
64	(Finland) Samuel Pökälä (FIN)	+ 8' 11.30"
65	(Azerbaijan) Elchin Asadov (AZE)	+ 8' 21.39"
66	(Romania) Andrei Nechita (ROU)	+ 8' 30.77"
67	(Colombia) Rafael Infantino (COL)	+ 9' 14.83"
68	(Andorra) David Albós (AND)	+ 9' 40.10"
69	(Eritrea) Meron Russom (ERI)	+ 9' 41.58"
70	(Ecuador) José Ragonessi (ECU)	+ 9' 43.75"
71	(Ecuador) Segundo Navarrete (ECU)	+ 9' 51.49"
72	(Albania) Eugert Zhupa (ALB)	+ 9' 54.57"
73	(South Korea) Jiyong Kang (KOR)	+ 10' 59.52"
74	(Mexico) Uri Martins (MEX)	+ 11' 44.67"
75	(Qatar) Ahmed Elbourdainy (QAT)	+ 12' 11.70"
76	(Paraguay) Gustavo Mino (PAR)	+ 15' 13.21"
77	(Syria) Nazir Jaser (SYR)	+ 15' 14.40"
	(Uganda) Rogers Balikudembe (UGA)	DNS
	(Uganda) Herbert Mugwanya (UGA)	DNS
