= Rohan Dennis =

Australian cyclist (born 1990)

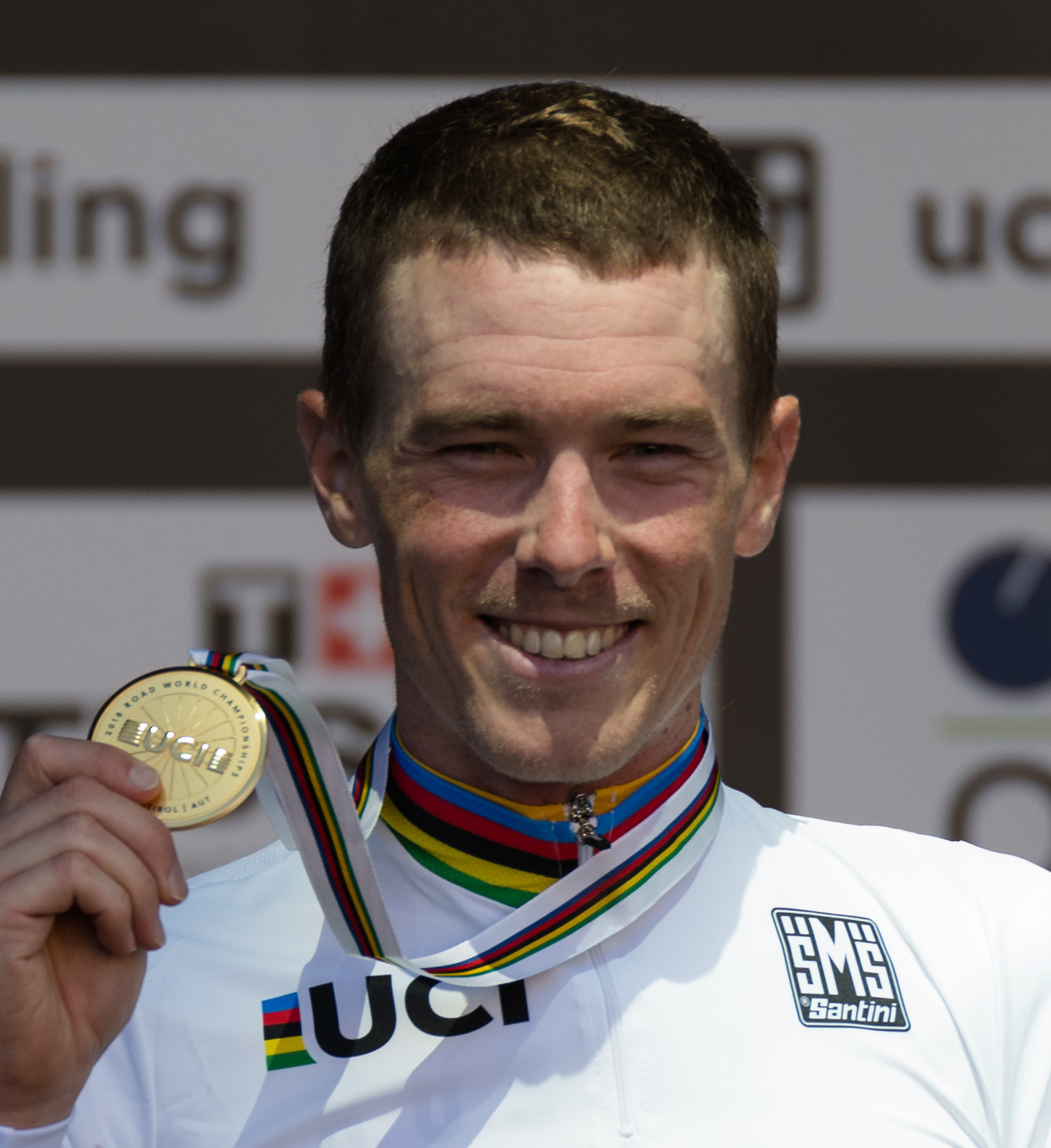
- Dennis in 2018

Personal information
- Born: 28 May 1990 (age 36) Adelaide, South Australia
- Height: 1.82 m (5 ft 11 1/2 in)
- Weight: 72 kg (159 lb; 11 st 5 lb)

Cycling career
- Sport: Cycling
- Disciplines: Road; Track
- Role: Rider
- Rider type: All-rounder

Amateur teams
- 2009–2010: Australia Institute of Sport
- 2011: Rabobank Continental Team
- 2012: Team Jayco–AIS

Professional teams
- 2013–2014: Garmin–Sharp
- 2014–2018: BMC Racing Team
- 2019: Bahrain–Merida
- 2020–2021: Team INEOS
- 2022–2023: Team Jumbo–Visma

Major wins
- Grand Tours Tour de France 1 individual stage (2015) 1 TTT stage (2015) Giro d'Italia 1 individual stage (2018) Vuelta a España 2 individual stages (2018) 2 TTT stages (2017, 2022) Stage races USA Pro Cycling Challenge (2015) Tour Down Under (2015) One-day races and Classics World Time Trial Championships (2018, 2019) National Time Trial Championships (2016–2018, 2022) World Hour record 8 February 2015, 52.491 km
Medal record
Representing Australia
Men's track cycling
Olympic Games
Silver medal – second place	2012 London	Team pursuit
World Championships
Gold medal – first place	2010 Ballerup	Team pursuit
Gold medal – first place	2011 Apeldoorn	Team pursuit
Silver medal – second place	2009 Pruszków	Team pursuit
Silver medal – second place	2012 Melbourne	Team pursuit
Men's road bicycle racing
Representing Australia
Olympic Games
Bronze medal – third place	2020 Tokyo	Time trial
World Championships
Gold medal – first place	2018 Innsbruck	Time trial
Gold medal – first place	2019 Yorkshire	Time trial
Silver medal – second place	2012 Valkenburg	Under-23 time trial
Commonwealth Games
Gold medal – first place	2022 Birmingham	Time trial
Silver medal – second place	2014 Glasgow	Time trial
Representing BMC Racing Team
World Championships
Gold medal – first place	2014 Ponferrada	Team time trial
Gold medal – first place	2015 Richmond	Team time trial
Silver medal – second place	2016 Doha	Team time trial
Silver medal – second place	2017 Bergen	Team time trial
Bronze medal – third place	2018 Innsbruck	Team time trial

Rohan Craig Dennis (born 28 May 1990) is an Australian former cyclist, who competed professionally in the track and road disciplines of the sport for five different teams.

Having been a member of the Australian team pursuit squad that won consecutive world titles at the UCI Track Cycling World Championships in 2010 and 2011, Dennis transitioned to road racing in 2013. Dennis took more than thirty wins in his career, the majority coming in individual time trials – including consecutive wins at the UCI Road World Championships in 2018 and 2019, four Australian National Time Trial Championships victories, and stage wins at all three Grand Tours. He also won the 2015 Tour Down Under and is a former holder of the Union Cycliste Internationale's hour record, having completed a distance of 52.491 kilometres (32.616 miles) in 2015.

On 31 December 2023, Rohan Dennis was involved in a fatal incident in which a vehicle he was driving struck and killed his wife, Olympian Melissa Hoskins, outside their home in Adelaide after the two got in an argument. In December 2024, Dennis pleaded guilty to an aggravated charge of creating a likelihood of harm. One of his first social media posts after causing the death of his wife was also troubling, containing a picture of a Porsche sports car with the caption "what an absolute weapon". Dennis faces additional legal issues as he was caught driving while disqualified with his two children and could face additional jail time.

== Career ==
=== Early life, education and track career ===
Dennis was born on 28 May 1990 in Adelaide, South Australia, where he grew up. Dennis began his career by focusing on the track, and was part of the Australian team that won the team pursuit at the UCI Track Cycling World Championships in 2010 and 2011, and took the silver medal in the team pursuit at the 2012 Summer Olympics.

=== Garmin–Sharp (2013–2014) ===
Dennis joined Garmin–Sharp for the 2013 season, and made his Tour de France debut later in the year, pulling out of the race before Stage 9. Having won the young rider classification at the Critérium du Dauphiné in June, Dennis took his first victories for the team at September's Tour of Alberta, where he won the third stage from a six-rider group and maintained his overall lead over the final two stages.

In 2014, Dennis finished second overall behind Bradley Wiggins at the Tour of California, after placing second to Wiggins in the individual time trial on stage two, before winning the third stage to Mount Diablo. He also placed second in the Circuit de la Sarthe, and the Commonwealth Games time trial behind England's Alex Dowsett.

=== BMC Racing Team (2014–2018) ===
==== 2014–2015 ====
In August 2014, Dennis made a rare mid-season transfer to the BMC Racing Team. He went on to win the team time trial at the UCI Road World Championships with his new team.

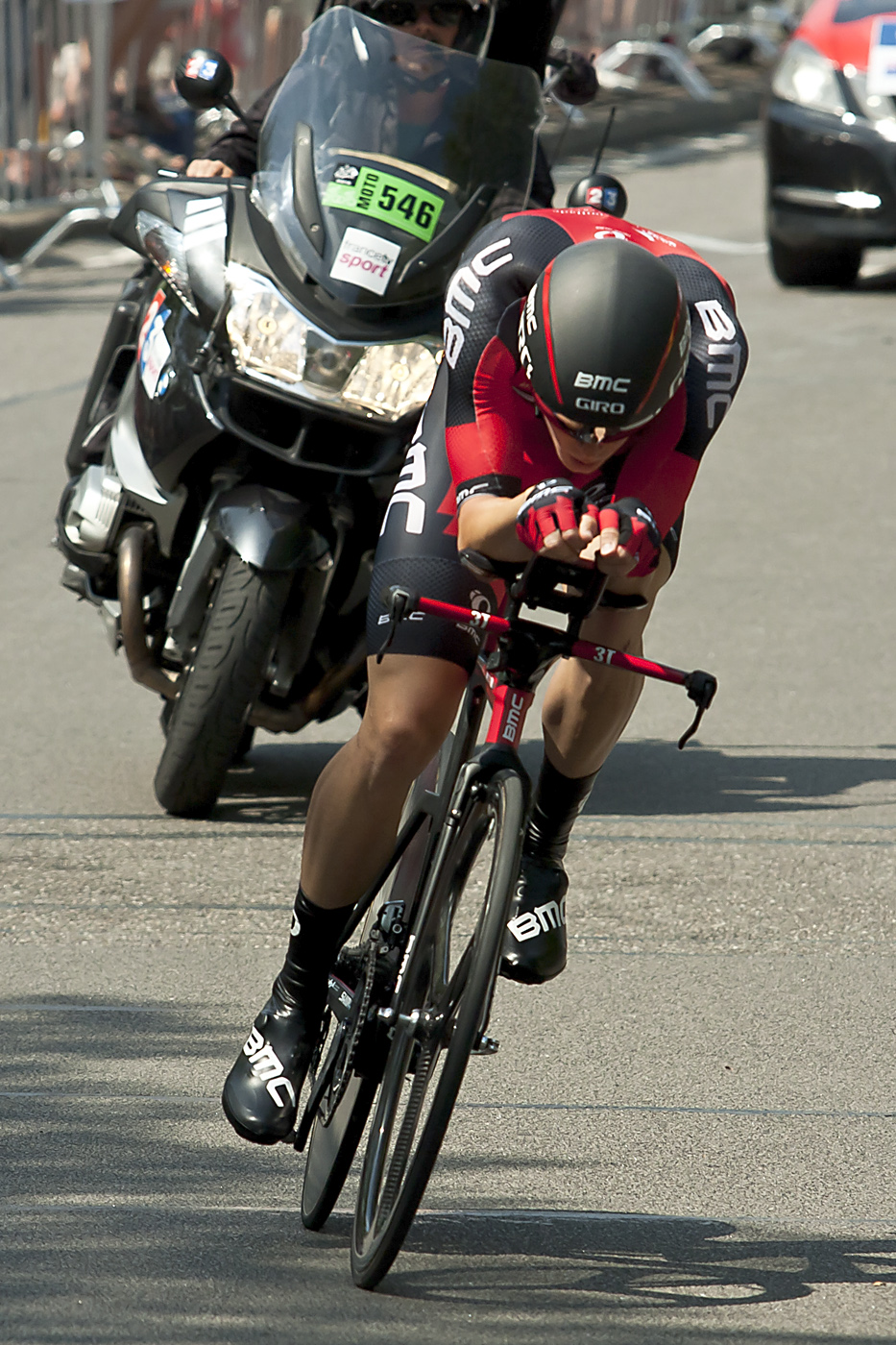
Dennis on his way to winning stage one of the 2015 Tour de France

Dennis started the 2015 season at home in Australia, finishing second at the Australian National Time Trial Championships, before winning a stage on his way to the overall victory at the Tour Down Under. On 8 February, he set a new hour record of 52.491 kilometres (32.616 miles), beating Matthias Brändle's record by 639 metres (2,096 feet). The record stood until 2 May, when it was broken by Alex Dowsett. Dennis was selected to ride the Tour de France as part of the BMC Racing Team squad supporting Tejay van Garderen. He won the opening individual time trial stage, to take the first yellow jersey of the race. His average speed of 55.446 km/h (34.5 mph) for the 13.8-kilometre (8.6-mile) route established a new record average speed for a Tour de France individual time trial stage. Following the Tour de France, Dennis won two successive stages and the overall classification at the USA Pro Cycling Challenge, and was a member of the BMC Racing Team squad that won the team time trial at the UCI Road World Championships. He won the Sir Hubert Opperman medal and trophy for Australia's best all-round cyclist in 2015.

==== 2016 ====
Dennis took his first elite national road title at the Australian National Time Trial Championships in January, finishing 38 seconds clear of his closest rival, Richie Porte. He then won the sixth stage individual time trial at May's Tour of California, and ultimately finished the race in second overall, behind Julian Alaphilippe. He was a contender for a medal in the road time trial at the Olympic Games in Rio de Janeiro, but a broken handlebar forced him to change bikes, finishing fifth on the day. Dennis added a further second-place overall finish at September's Tour of Britain, winning the penultimate stage after attacking 2 kilometres (1.2 miles) prior to the finish in Bristol. Having won the individual time trial on stage 2 and been part of the team time trial win on stage 5, Dennis led the Eneco Tour by 16 seconds going into the final day, but he withdrew from the race due to a crash.

==== 2017 ====
Dennis retained his Australian National Time Trial Championships title in January, finishing almost a minute clear of his next closest competitor, Luke Durbridge. After a sixth-place finish at the Tour Down Under while also helping teammate Richie Porte to the overall victory, Dennis won the Tour La Provence, taking two second-place finishes over the three stages. He finished second overall at Tirreno–Adriatico, leading the race overall for a day, and taking a stage win on the final individual time trial stage, in San Benedetto del Tronto. Dennis won a stage at the Tour of the Alps prior to the Giro d'Italia, however he abandoned the Giro d'Italia on stage four due to headaches and nausea caused by a crash on stage two. He returned to racing at the Tour de Suisse, where he won the individual time trials that bookended the race. Subsequently, at the Vuelta a España, Dennis crossed the line first as part of the BMC Racing Team squad that won the race's opening team time trial, taking the race leader's red jersey and becoming the first Australian to lead the race since Michael Matthews in 2014.

==== 2018 ====
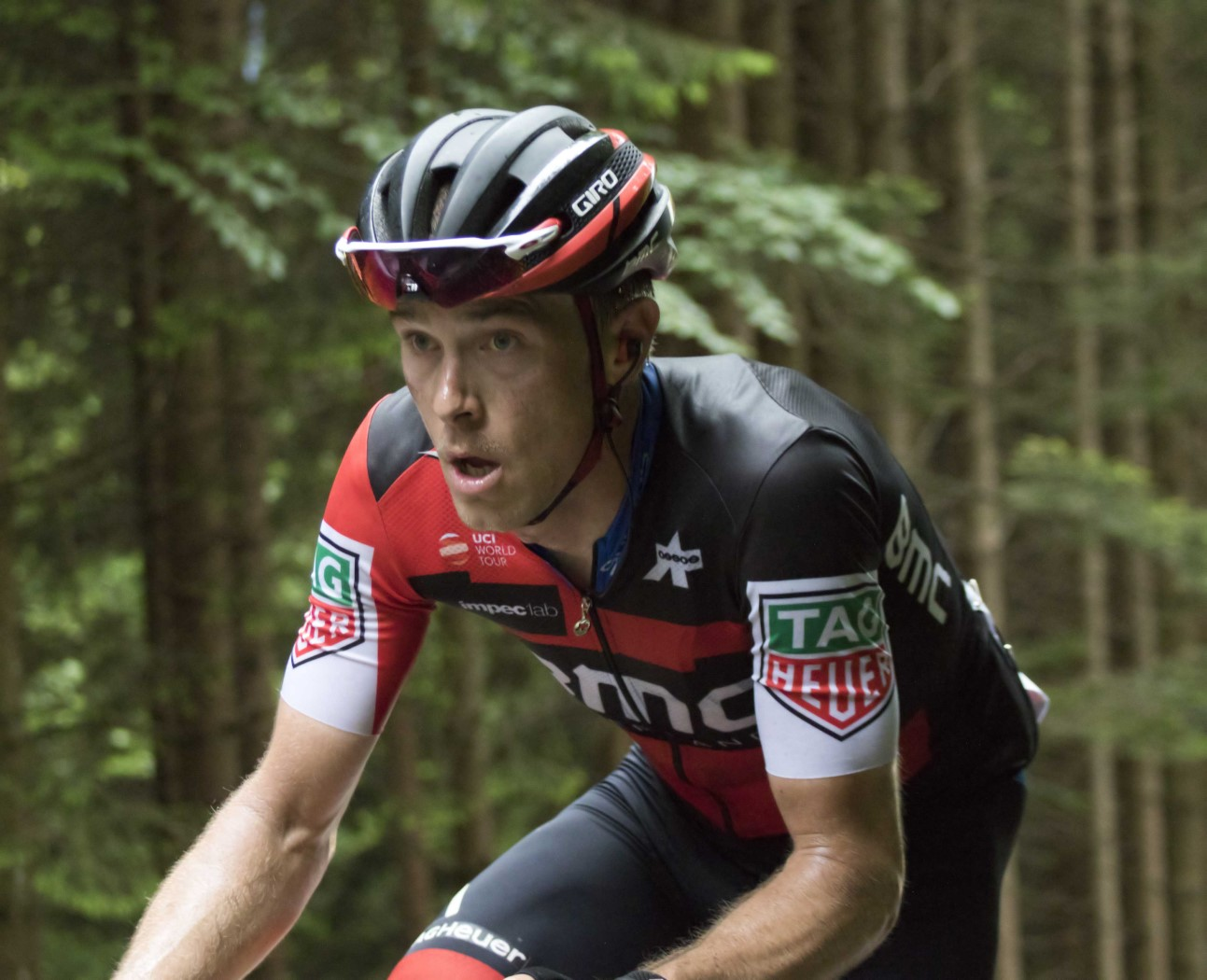
Dennis at the 2018 Giro d'Italia, where he became the third Australian rider to wear the leader's jersey at all three Grand Tours

Having won a third consecutive title in the Australian National Time Trial Championships in January, Dennis took a stage victory in the individual time trial at the Abu Dhabi Tour, which moved him into the race lead prior to the final day; he ultimately finished ninth overall, after losing time on the uphill finish to Jebel Hafeet. He added a further individual time trial stage win at Tirreno–Adriatico, while also finishing in the top ten overall at the Tour de Romandie. At the Giro d'Italia, Dennis was narrowly defeated in the opening time trial in Jerusalem by Tom Dumoulin. However, he took the race leader's pink jersey the following day, by picking up a time bonus in an intermediate sprint. In doing so, he became the first Australian to lead the Giro d'Italia since Simon Clarke in 2015, and the third Australian to wear the leader's jersey in all three Grand Tours, after Bradley McGee and Cadel Evans. He held the lead as the race returned to Italy, ultimately losing the lead after stage 6, which finished at Mount Etna. He went on to win the stage 16 time trial and finished the race in 16th place overall, 56 minutes and 7 seconds down on winner Chris Froome.

He won the first stage at the Vuelta a España to complete his set of winning a stage at the three Grand Tours, and became the fifteenth rider (and first non-European) to have won an individual time trial at each Grand Tour. He went on to win the stage 16 time trial, and left the Vuelta a España immediately after to prepare for the UCI Road World Championships in Austria, winning the time trial title by over a minute ahead of defending champion Dumoulin. He also helped his BMC Racing Team squad win the bronze medal in the team time trial. At the end of 2018, he won two major Australian awards: Australian Institute of Sport Performance Awards – Male Athlete of the Year and Cycling Australia's Sir Hubert Opperman Medal, which he had previously won in 2015.

=== Bahrain–Merida (2019) ===
In August 2018, it was announced that Dennis would join Bahrain–Merida in 2019 on a two-year deal, making the move from BMC Racing Team alongside team-mates Damiano Caruso and Dylan Teuns. He made his first start in team colours at the Australian National Time Trial Championships, where he was beaten to the title by Luke Durbridge. He did not win until June's Tour de Suisse, when he won the opening individual time trial stage, on his way to an overall finish of second place behind Egan Bernal. On 18 July, he abandoned the Tour de France during Stage 12. No reason was immediately given, but later reports indicated that his abandonment was the result over frustration with equipment provided by the team. In an interview he subsequently gave in January 2020, Dennis stated that he left the Tour de France as his mental health was suffering due to difficulties with the team, and he feared that this would have a knock-on effect on his marriage.

On 25 September, Dennis raced for the first time since abandoning the Tour de France, defending his time trial title at the UCI Road World Championships in Yorkshire. Dennis rode an unmarked BMC bicycle during the race, rather than his trade Merida machine. Several days later, his former team Bahrain–Merida confirmed that they had parted ways with Dennis on 13 September. Dennis filed a complaint against the team with the Union Cycliste Internationale (UCI), intimating that he should be paid by the team until the end of his original contract in 2020; the UCI later dismissed the complaint the following summer.

=== Team Ineos (2020–2021) ===
On 9 December 2019, it was announced that Dennis would be joining Team INEOS for the 2020 season. The following month Dennis stated that he had abandoned his attempts to become a contender for the general classification in Grand Tours; instead, he would focus on smaller stage races and working as a domestique in the three-week races.

Just as he did in 2019, Dennis finished second to Luke Durbridge in the 2020 Australian National Time Trial Championships, before going on to finish in fourth place overall at the Tour Down Under. He was unable to win a third successive time trial title at the UCI Road World Championships, finishing in fifth place. He then contested the Giro d'Italia, which was held after the World Championships due to having been postponed as a result of the COVID-19 pandemic in Italy. In the final week of the race, he was a key domestique for Tao Geoghegan Hart's eventual general classification victory, featuring in breakaways on stages 15 and 17, and in the lead group on stage 18 – which featured an ascent of the Stelvio Pass – and to the summit finish at Sestriere on stage 20. Dennis won the race's Cima Coppi award by being the first to reach the summit of the highest climb in the race, which was the Stelvio Pass.

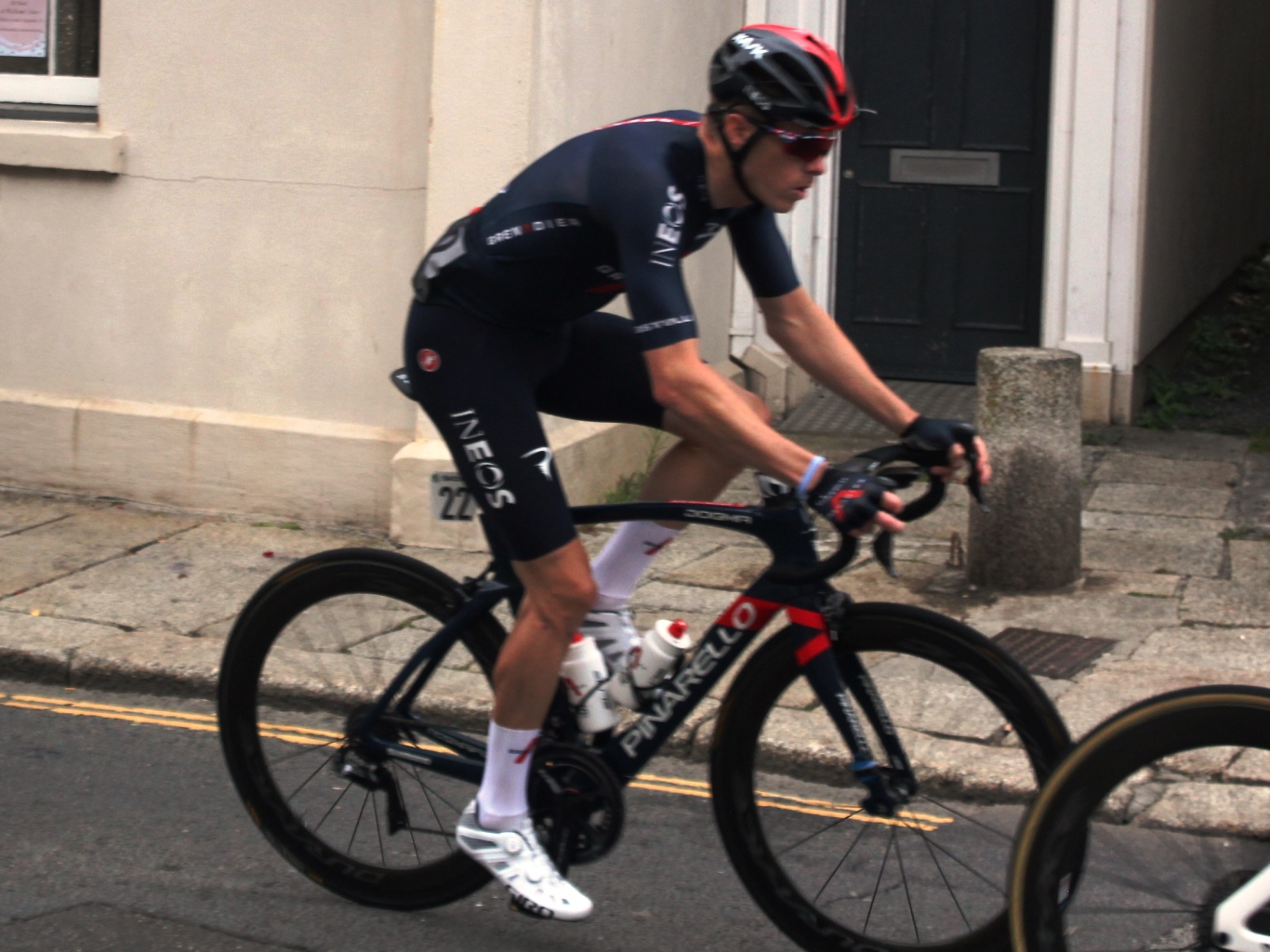
Dennis at the 2021 Tour of Britain

Dennis took his first victory with the INEOS Grenadiers at the 2021 Volta a Catalunya, winning the second stage – an individual time trial – in Banyoles. He then won the prologue at the Tour de Romandie, holding the race lead for a further two stages thereafter, before a crash on stage three saw him cede the lead. He then took his first road medal at the COVID-19 pandemic-delayed Olympic Games in Tokyo, winning a bronze medal in the road time trial, missing out on the silver to Tom Dumoulin by two-and-a-half seconds. His last start of the season was at the Tour of Britain, finishing sixth overall following the victory for the INEOS Grenadiers in the team time trial on stage three.

=== Team Jumbo–Visma (2022–2023) ===
On 1 September 2021, it was announced that Dennis would be joining Team Jumbo–Visma in 2022 on a two-year deal; earlier in his career, he had been with the Rabobank Continental Team, with Rabobank being a previous iteration of Team Jumbo–Visma. In his first race of the year, he won his fourth Australian National Time Trial Championships. He led the Tour de Romandie for four days, before dropping to eighth overall on the final individual time trial stage, having lost more than two minutes to eventual winner Aleksandr Vlasov. Later in the season, Dennis won the gold medal in the road time trial at the Commonwealth Games, finishing almost half a minute clear of Fred Wright and Geraint Thomas, the latter having been delayed by a crash. He missed the subsequent road race for medical reasons, having been taken to hospital.

At the 2023 Tour Down Under, Dennis won the second stage in Victor Harbor, making a move inside the final kilometre from a group of five riders that would ultimately hold off the closing group of sprinters. On 10 February 2023, Dennis announced his retirement from professional cycling by the end of the racing season. He supported general classification victories for Jonas Vingegaard at O Gran Camiño and the Tour of the Basque Country, and for Primož Roglič at the Giro d'Italia. He only raced twice in the second half of the 2023 season, finishing seventh in the time trial at the UCI Road World Championships (despite crashing late on), and he failed to finish the Grand Prix Cycliste de Québec.

== Personal life ==
In May 2017, Dennis' partner, fellow racing cyclist Melissa Hoskins, announced the couple's engagement as well as her retirement from competition. They married in February 2018. Hoskins gave birth to their first child, a son, later that year, two and a half weeks after Dennis won his first World Time Trial Championship. As of 2017, the family were splitting their time between Girona, La Massana, and Adelaide. They subsequently had another child.

=== 2024 legal proceedings ===
On 31 December 2023, Dennis was arrested and charged with causing death by dangerous driving, driving without due care, and endangering life, after he had allegedly fatally injured Hoskins while driving a ute in the Adelaide suburb of Medindie. He was released on bail, and appeared in the Adelaide Magistrates Court, in March 2024. His bail was later extended to August 2024, when he was charged with causing death by dangerous driving and driving without due care.

Dennis pleaded guilty in December 2024 to an aggravated charge of creating a likelihood of harm. Prosecutors dropped the more serious charges of dangerous driving causing death and aggravated driving without due care, acknowledging that Dennis acted recklessly but without intent to harm his wife. The offence is classed as aggravated because he and the victim were in a relationship. On 24 January, the guilty plea was entered formally at a District Court arraignment. The charge carries a maximum penalty of seven years' imprisonment and a five-year licence suspension. Sentencing was deferred until sentencing submissions and victim impact statements were heard. On 14 May 2025, Dennis was sentenced to 17 months in prison with a non-parole period of ten months; however, the judge suspended the sentence on a two-year good-behaviour bond, as Dennis is the sole carer of the couple's two children. Judge Ian Press emphasised that Dennis was not criminally responsible for causing his wife's death, but his conviction related to driving up to 75 m (246 ft) while Hoskins was clinging to the bonnet of his car. He was also suspended from driving for 5 years.

=== 2026 controversies ===
In March 2025, Dennis became the subject of criticism for his social media post depicting a Porsche car which he described as an "absolute weapon". The South Australian Victims' Rights Commissioner described the post as "deeply offensive".

Appearing in court in May 2025, Dennis pleaded guilty to an aggravated charge of creating likelihood of harm. He was given a 17-month prison sentence, suspended with a two-year good behaviour bond, and banned from driving for five years. He did not apologise and continued to engage in a public argument with news outlets reporting on his social media activity.

On 11 June 2026, it was revealed that that Dennis had been apprehended by South Australian police after being observed driving while disqualified, with two children as passengers. His vehicle was impounded for 28 days and he was summonsed to appear in court at a later date. On 17 July 2026, Dennis pleaded guilty to driving whilst disqualified, and was scheduled to appear in the District Court in September, to answer the driving charge, as well as his breach of the good behaviour bond imposed after his 2025 court appearance.

== Major results ==
=== Road ===
2007
9th Time trial, UCI Junior World Championships
2010
1st Time trial, National Under-23 Championships
3rd Overall Thüringen Rundfahrt der U23

1st Stage 1 (TTT)

4th Overall Olympia's Tour
5th Time trial, UCI Under-23 World Championships
6th Time trial, Commonwealth Games
10th Overall Ringerike GP
2011
4th Road race, National Under-23 Championships
2012
National Under-23 Championships

1st Road race
1st Time trial

1st Overall Thüringen Rundfahrt der U23

1st Stage 5 (ITT)

1st Memorial Davide Fardelli
1st Chrono Champenois
2nd Time trial, UCI Under-23 World Championships
2nd Trofeo Alcide De Gasperi
4th Overall Olympia's Tour

1st Stage 5 (ITT)

5th Overall Tour Down Under

1st Mountains classification
1st Young rider classification

5th Trofeo Città di San Vendemiano
2013
1st Overall Tour of Alberta

1st Young rider classification
1st Stage 3

2nd Time trial, National Championships
8th Overall Critérium du Dauphiné

1st Young rider classification

2014
UCI World Championships

1st Team time trial
5th Time trial

2nd Time trial, Commonwealth Games
2nd Overall Tour of California

1st Stage 3

2nd Overall Circuit de la Sarthe

1st Young rider classification

2015
UCI World Championships

1st Team time trial
6th Time trial

1st Overall Tour Down Under

1st Young rider classification
1st Stage 3

1st Overall USA Pro Cycling Challenge

1st Mountains classification
1st Stages 4 & 5 (ITT)

Tour de France

1st Stages 1 (ITT) & 9 (TTT)
Held, & after Stage 1

1st Stage 3 (TTT) Critérium du Dauphiné
2nd Time trial, National Championships
2016
1st Time trial, National Championships
Eneco Tour

1st Stages 2 (ITT) & 5 (TTT)

UCI World Championships

2nd Team time trial
6th Time trial

2nd Overall Tour of California

1st Stage 6 (ITT)

2nd Overall Tour of Britain

1st Stage 7b

5th Time trial, Olympic Games
2017
1st Time trial, National Championships
1st Overall Tour La Provence

1st Points classification

Vuelta a España

1st Stage 1 (TTT)
Held after Stage 1

Tour de Suisse

1st Stages 1 (ITT) & 9 (ITT)

1st Stage 2 Tour of the Alps
1st Stage 2 (TTT) Volta a Catalunya
UCI World Championships

2nd Team time trial
8th Time trial

2nd Overall Tirreno–Adriatico

1st Stages 1 (TTT) & 7 (ITT)

6th Overall Tour Down Under
2018
UCI World Championships

1st Time trial
3rd Team time trial

1st Time trial, National Championships
Vuelta a España

1st Stages 1 (ITT) & 16 (ITT)
Held, & after Stage 1

Giro d'Italia

1st Stage 16 (ITT)
Held after Stages 2–5

Tirreno–Adriatico

1st Stages 1 (TTT) & 7 (ITT)

7th Overall Tour de Romandie
9th Overall Abu Dhabi Tour

1st Stage 4 (ITT)

2019
1st Time trial, UCI World Championships
2nd Time trial, National Championships
2nd Overall Tour de Suisse

1st Stage 1 (ITT)

5th Overall Tour Down Under
2020
2nd Time trial, National Championships
4th Overall Tour Down Under
5th Time trial, UCI World Championships
2021
1st Prologue Tour de Romandie
1st Stage 2 (ITT) Volta a Catalunya
3rd Time trial, Olympic Games
6th Overall Tour of Britain

1st Stage 3 (TTT)

2022
1st Time trial, Commonwealth Games
1st Time trial, National Championships
1st Stage 1 (TTT) Vuelta a España
8th Overall Tour de Romandie
2023
1st Stage 2 Tour Down Under
1st Stage 3 (TTT) Paris–Nice
7th Time trial, UCI World Championships

==== General classification results timeline ====
Grand Tour general classification results
Grand Tour	2013	2014	2015	2016	2017	2018	2019	2020	2021	2022	2023
Giro d'Italia	—	—	—	—	DNF	16	—	35	—	—	41
Tour de France	DNF	—	101	DNF	—	—	DNF	—	—	—	—
Vuelta a España	—	84	—	—	DNF	DNF	—	—	—	52	—
Major stage race general classification results
Race	2013	2014	2015	2016	2017	2018	2019	2020	2021	2022	2023
Paris–Nice	—	—	DNF	—	—	—	—	—	45	DNF	85
Tirreno–Adriatico	77	—	—	—	2	79	95	87	—	—	—
Volta a Catalunya	—	—	—	DNF	DNF	—	—	NH	46	54	—
Tour of the Basque Country	—	—	42	—	—	—	DNF	NH	—	—	DNF
Tour de Romandie	76	43	38	—	—	7	—	NH	17	8	—
Critérium du Dauphiné	8	—	34	68	—	—	—	—	—	—	—
Tour de Suisse	—	89	—	—	97	—	2	NH	37	DNF	DNF

==== Major championships timeline ====
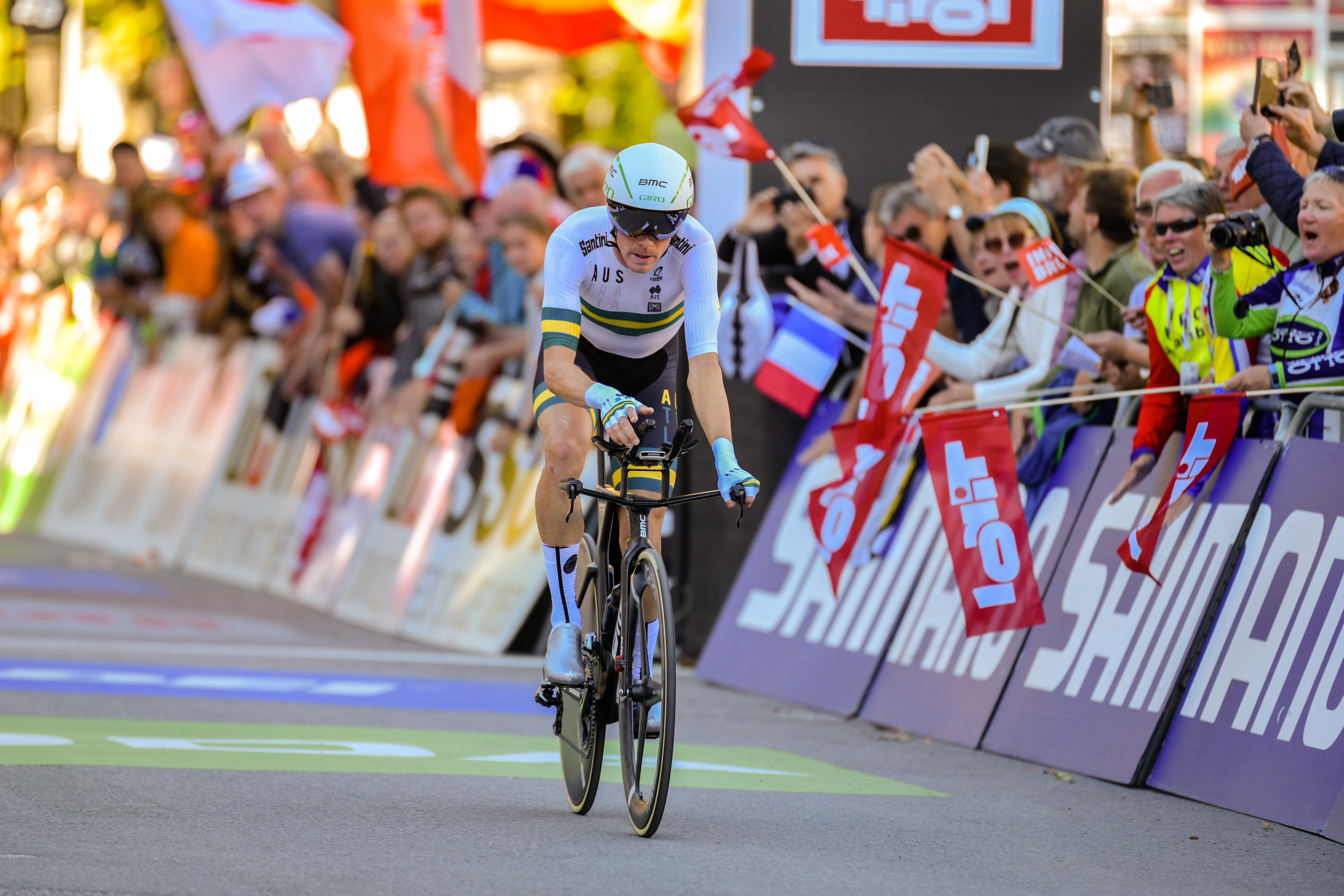
Dennis won the first of two consecutive titles in the time trial at the UCI Road World Championships in 2018

Event		2013	2014	2015	2016	2017	2018	2019	2020	2021	2022	2023
Olympic Games	Time trial	Not held			5	Not held				3	Not held	
Olympic Games	Road race	Not held			DNF	Not held				—	Not held	
World Championships	Time trial	12	5	6	6	8	1	1	5	—	—	7
World Championships	Road race	DNF	DNF	—	—	—	DNF	DNF	—	—	—	—
World Championships	Team time trial	8	1	1	2	2	3	Not held				
National Championships	Time trial	2	DNF	2	1	1	1	2	2	—	1	—
National Championships	Road race	DNF	DNF	DNF	DNF	—	DNF	—	—	—	DNF	—

Legend
—	Did not compete
DNF	Did not finish
NH	Not held

=== Track ===
2007
1st Team pursuit, National Junior Championships
2008
UCI Junior World Championships

1st Team pursuit
2nd Individual pursuit

1st Team pursuit, 2008–09 UCI Track Cycling World Cup Classics, Melbourne
National Junior Championships

1st Individual pursuit
1st Points race

2009
1st Team pursuit, 2008–09 UCI Track Cycling World Cup Classics, Beijing
2nd Team pursuit, UCI World Championships
3rd Team pursuit, National Championships
2010
1st Team pursuit, UCI World Championships
National Championships

1st Team pursuit
2nd Individual pursuit

2011
1st Team pursuit, UCI World Championships
1st Individual pursuit, 2010–11 UCI Track Cycling World Cup Classics, Manchester
National Championships

1st Team pursuit
2nd Individual pursuit

2012
1st Team pursuit, 2011–12 UCI Track Cycling World Cup, London
National Championships

1st Team pursuit
2nd Individual pursuit

2nd Team pursuit, Olympic Games
2nd Team pursuit, UCI World Championships
2015
World Hour record: 52.491 km

Sporting positions
Preceded by Richie Porte	Australian National Time Trial Championships; Winner; 2016–2018	Succeeded by Luke Durbridge
Preceded by Luke Plapp	Australian National Time Trial Championships; Winner; 2022	Succeeded by Jay Vine
Awards
Preceded by Scotty James	Australian Institute of Sport; Male Athlete of The Year; 2018	Succeeded by Scotty James
Records
Preceded by Matthias Brändle	UCI hour record (52.491 km); 8 February 2015 – 2 May 2015	Succeeded by Alex Dowsett
