= 2020 UCI Road World Championships – Men's time trial =

Cycling race

Men's time trial
2020 UCI Road World Championships

Race details
- Dates: 25 September 2020
- Stages: 1
- Distance: 31.7 km (19.70 mi)
- Winning time: 35' 54.10"

Medalists
	Gold	(Italy) Filippo Ganna (ITA)
	Silver	(Belgium) Wout van Aert (BEL)
	Bronze	(Switzerland) Stefan Küng (SUI)

The Men's time trial of the 2020 UCI Road World Championships was a cycling event that took place on 25 September 2020 in Imola, Italy. Rohan Dennis was the defending champion. Italy's Filippo Ganna won the event, with Wout van Aert in second place, and Stefan Küng finishing in third.

The event took place on a 31.7 kilometres (19.7 mi) flat course, starting from the Autodromo Internazionale Enzo e Dino Ferrari (a motor racing circuit) before turning at Borgo Tossignano to return to the finish line at the Autodromo.

== Qualification ==
=== Participating nations ===
57 cyclists from 38 nations competed in the event. The number of cyclists per nation is shown in parentheses.

- Australia (2)
- Austria (2)
- Azerbaijan (1)
- Belarus (1)
- Belgium (2)
- Bulgaria (1)
- Canada (2)
- Chile (1)
- Colombia (1)
- Czech Republic (2)
- Denmark (2)
- Estonia (1)
- France (2)
- Germany (2)
- Great Britain (2)
- Greece (1)
- Hungary (2)
- Iceland (1)
- Ireland (2)
- Italy (2)
- Kazakhstan (2)
- Lithuania (1)
- Mexico (1)
- Netherlands (2)
- New Zealand (2)
- Norway (1)
- Poland (2)
- Portugal (2)
- Russia (2)
- Serbia (1)
- Slovakia (1)
- Slovenia (1)
- Spain (1)
- Sweden (1)
- Switzerland (1)
- Syria (1)
- Ukraine (1)
- United States (2)

== Final classification ==
56 out of the race's 57 cyclists finished the 31.7-kilometre (19.7 mi)-long course.

Rank	Rider	Time
1st place, gold medalist(s)	(Italy) Filippo Ganna (ITA)	35' 54.10"
2nd place, silver medalist(s)	(Belgium) Wout van Aert (BEL)	+ 26.72"
3rd place, bronze medalist(s)	(Switzerland) Stefan Küng (SUI)	+ 29.80"
4	(United Kingdom) Geraint Thomas (GBR)	+ 37.02"
5	(Australia) Rohan Dennis (AUS)	+ 39.76"
6	(Denmark) Kasper Asgreen (DEN)	+ 47.13"
7	(France) Rémi Cavagna (FRA)	+ 48.35"
8	(Belgium) Victor Campenaerts (BEL)	+ 52.81"
9	(United Kingdom) Alex Dowsett (GBR)	+ 1' 06.38"
10	(Netherlands) Tom Dumoulin (NED)	+ 1' 14.06"
11	(Portugal) Nelson Oliveira (POR)	+ 1' 15.05"
12	(New Zealand) Patrick Bevin (NZL)	+ 1' 19.04"
13	(Norway) Andreas Leknessund (NOR)	+ 1' 30.00"
14	(Italy) Edoardo Affini (ITA)	+ 1' 31.52"
15	(Australia) Luke Durbridge (AUS)	+ 1' 36.29"
16	(Germany) Jasha Sütterlin (GER)	+ 1' 38.00"
17	(Denmark) Mikkel Bjerg (DEN)	+ 1' 47.53"
18	(Colombia) Daniel Martínez (COL)	+ 1' 52.59"
19	(Germany) Max Walscheid (GER)	+ 1' 56.91"
20	(Poland) Kamil Gradek (POL)	+ 2' 05.95"
21	(Netherlands) Jos van Emden (NED)	+ 2' 14.67"
22	(France) Benjamin Thomas (FRA)	+ 2' 14.98"
23	(Czech Republic) Josef Černý (CZE)	+ 2' 15.93"
24	(Slovenia) Jan Tratnik (SLO)	+ 2' 24.66"
25	(Republic of Ireland) Ryan Mullen (IRL)	+ 2' 31.51"
26	(Spain) Pello Bilbao (ESP)	+ 2' 33.70"
27	(Austria) Matthias Brändle (AUT)	+ 2' 34.41"
28	(Poland) Maciej Bodnar (POL)	+ 2' 37.11"
29	(United States) Brandon McNulty (USA)	+ 2' 51.78"
30	(United States) Lawson Craddock (USA)	+ 2' 54.48"
31	(Republic of Ireland) Nicolas Roche (IRL)	+ 3' 02.21"
32	(Kazakhstan) Dmitriy Gruzdev (KAZ)	+ 3' 11.49"
33	(Ukraine) Mykhaylo Kononenko (UKR)	+ 3' 21.70"
34	(Portugal) Ivo Oliveira (POR)	+ 3' 23.48"
35	(Russia) Petr Rikunov (RUS)	+ 3' 29.76"
36	(Lithuania) Evaldas Šiškevičius (LTU)	+ 3' 29.77"
37	(Czech Republic) Jakub Otruba (CZE)	+ 3' 31.92"
38	(Hungary) Barnabás Peák (HUN)	+ 3' 32.16"
39	(Chile) Carlos Oyarzun (CHI)	+ 3' 46.13"
40	(Mexico) Ulises Alfredo Castillo (MEX)	+ 3' 48.99"
41	(Canada) Alexander Cataford (CAN)	+ 3' 49.31"
42	(Greece) Polychronis Tzortzakis (GRE)	+ 3' 51.48"
43	(Kazakhstan) Daniil Fominykh (KAZ)	+ 3' 51.84"
44	(Sweden) Tobias Ludvigsson (SWE)	+ 3' 56.54"
45	(Estonia) Gleb Karpenko (EST)	+ 4' 23.11"
46	(Austria) Felix Ritzinger (AUT)	+ 4' 26.35"
47	(Serbia) Ognjen Ilić (SRB)	+ 4' 33.62"
48	(Slovakia) Ján Andrej Cully (SVK)	+ 4' 48.48"
49	(Russia) Andrei Stepanov (RUS)	+ 4' 52.59"
50	(New Zealand) Finn Fisher-Black (NZL)	+ 4' 57.95"
51	(Hungary) Viktor Filutás (HUN)	+ 5' 23.50"
52	(Belarus) Yauheni Karaliok (BLR)	+ 5' 41.87"
53	(Bulgaria) Spas Gyurov (BUL)	+ 5' 42.01"
54	(Azerbaijan) Elchin Asadov (AZE)	+ 5' 57.22"
55	(Syria) Ahmad Wais (SYR)	+ 6' 25.33"
56	(Iceland) Ingvar Ómarsson (ISL)	+ 6' 25.86"
	(Canada) Hugo Houle (CAN)	DNS
