= Arsalan Anjum Muhammad =

Pakistani cyclist (born 1995)

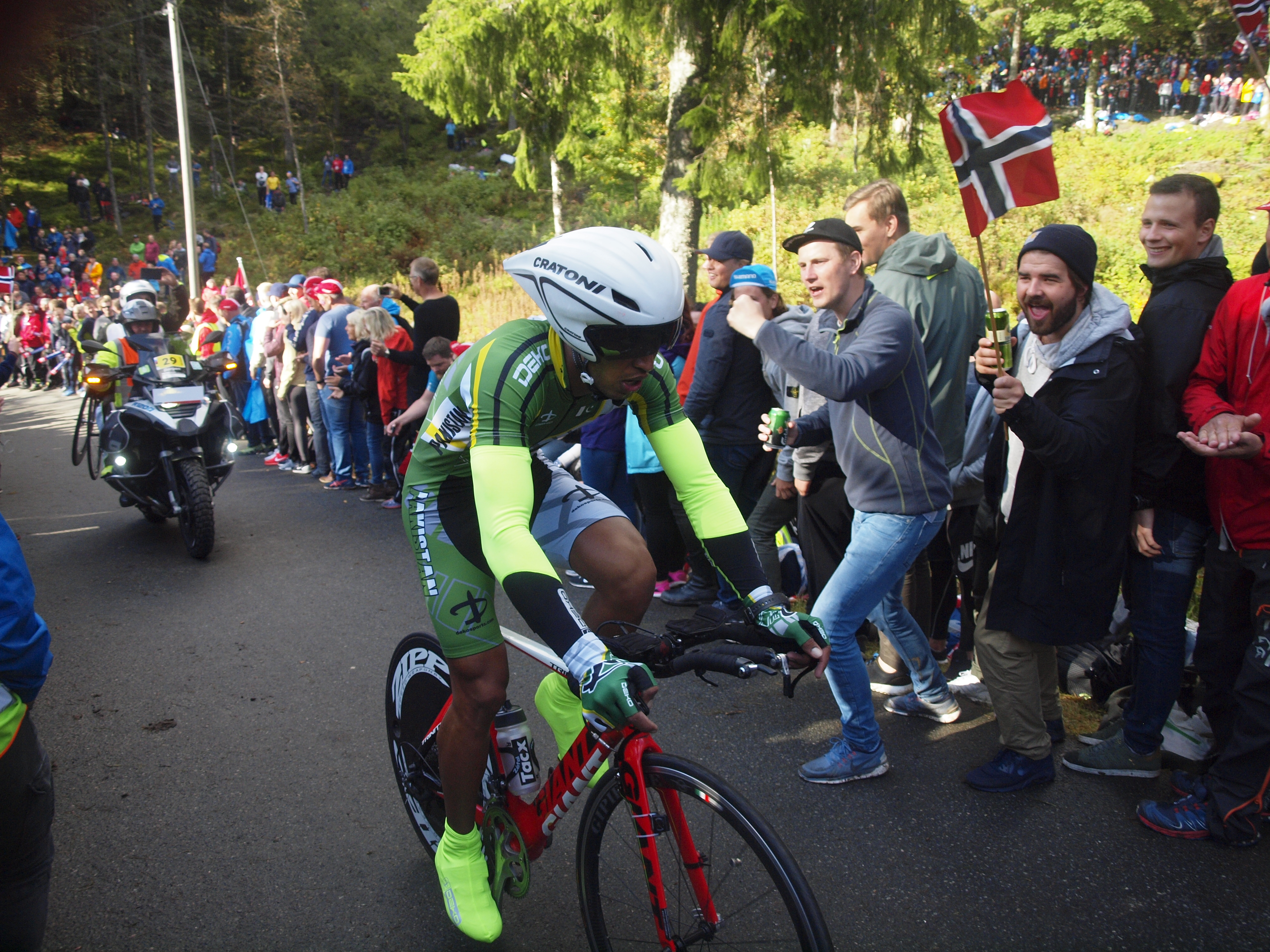
- Arsalan Anjud Muhammad at the 2017 UCI Road World Championships

Personal information
- Born: 15 May 1995 (age 31) Karachi, Pakistan

Cycling career
- Sport: Cycling
- Discipline: Road
- Role: Rider

Arsalan Anjum Muhammad (born 15 May 1995) is a Pakistani cyclist. He rode in the time trial at the 2017 UCI Road World Championships.

== Major results ==
=== 2016 ===
1st National Time Trial Championships

=== 2017 ===
61st 84th World Championships - ITT
15th Asian Cycling Championships U23- ITT

=== 2018 ===
21st Asian Cycling Championships
