= Big Four (cycling) =

Nickname for quartet of cyclists

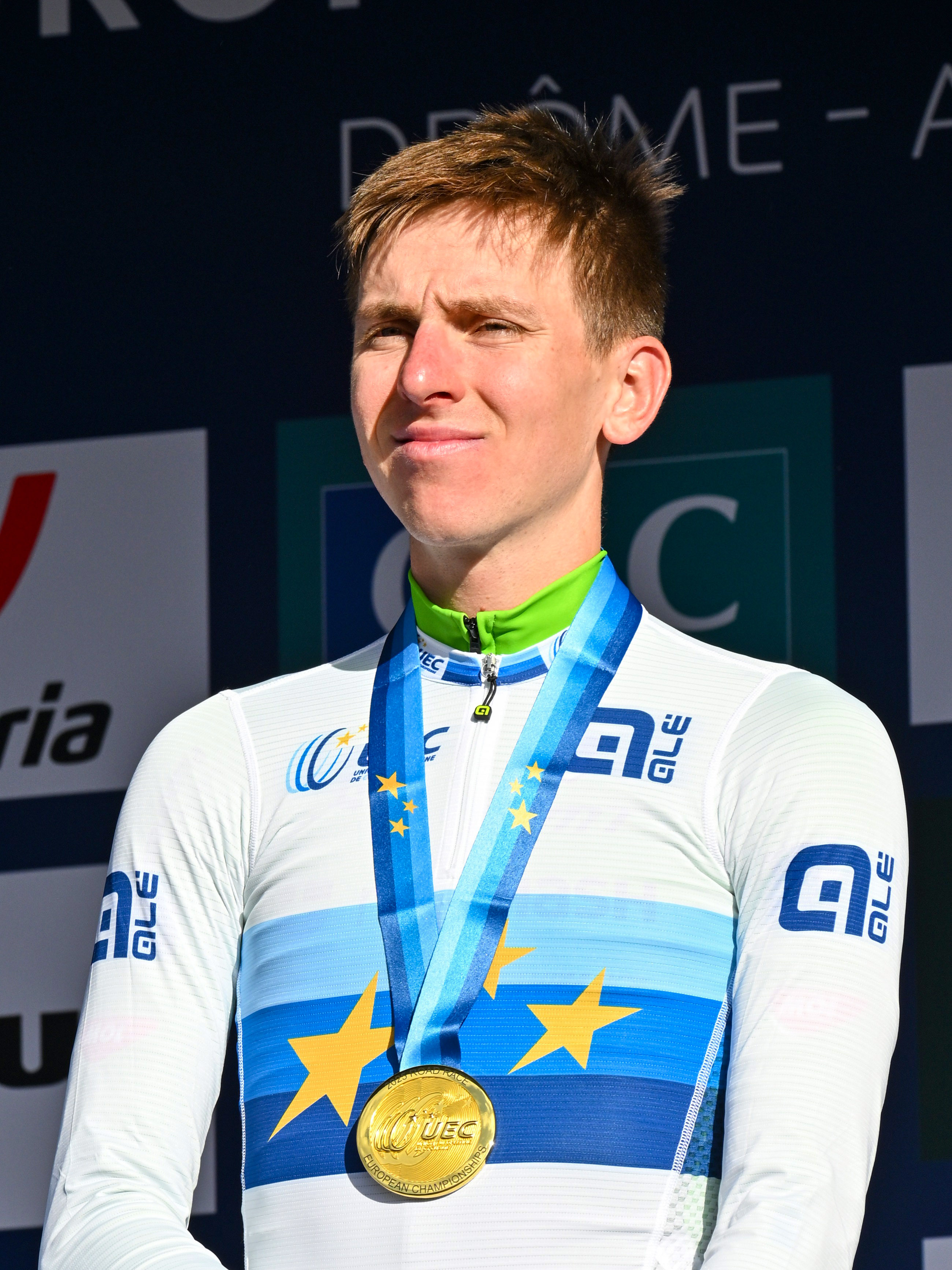
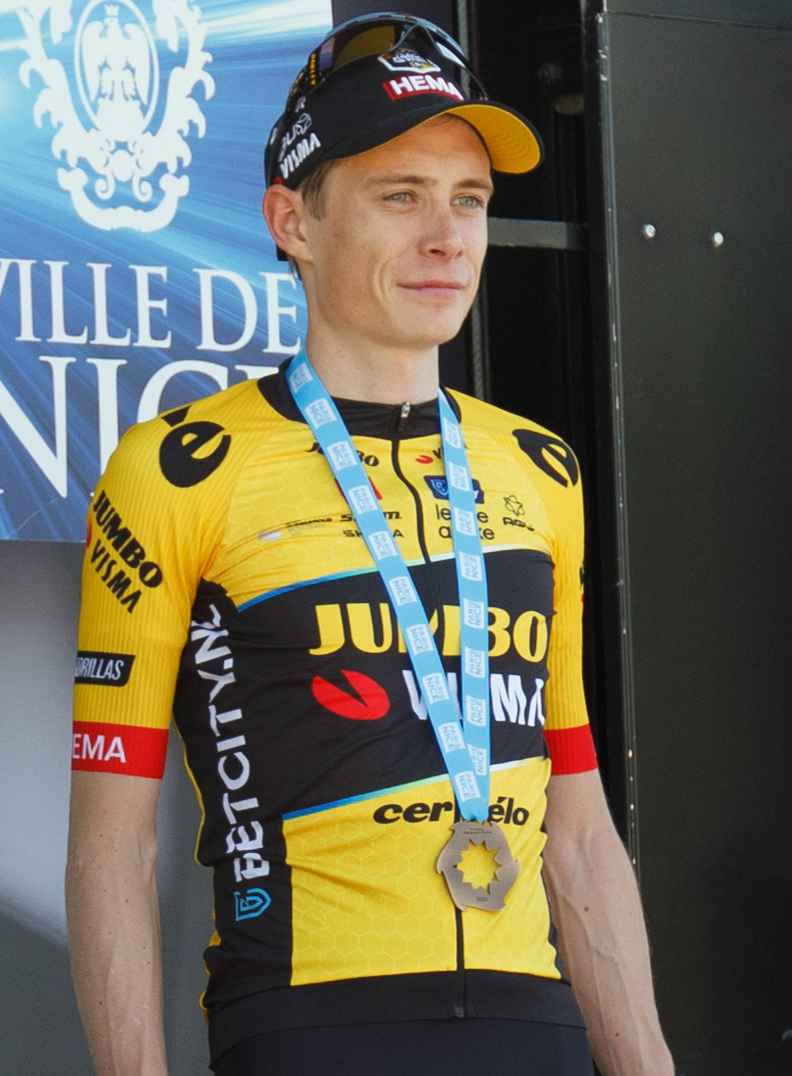
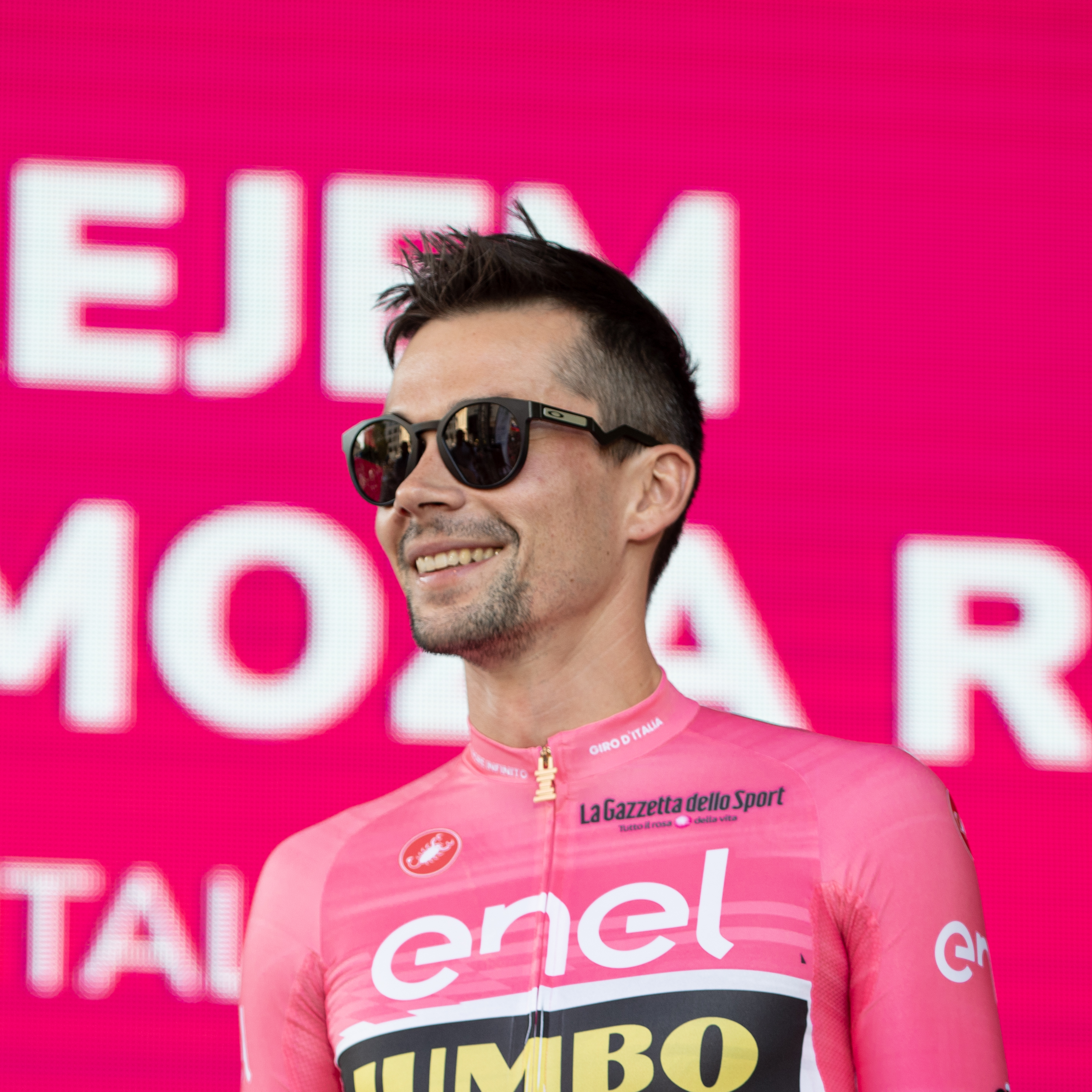
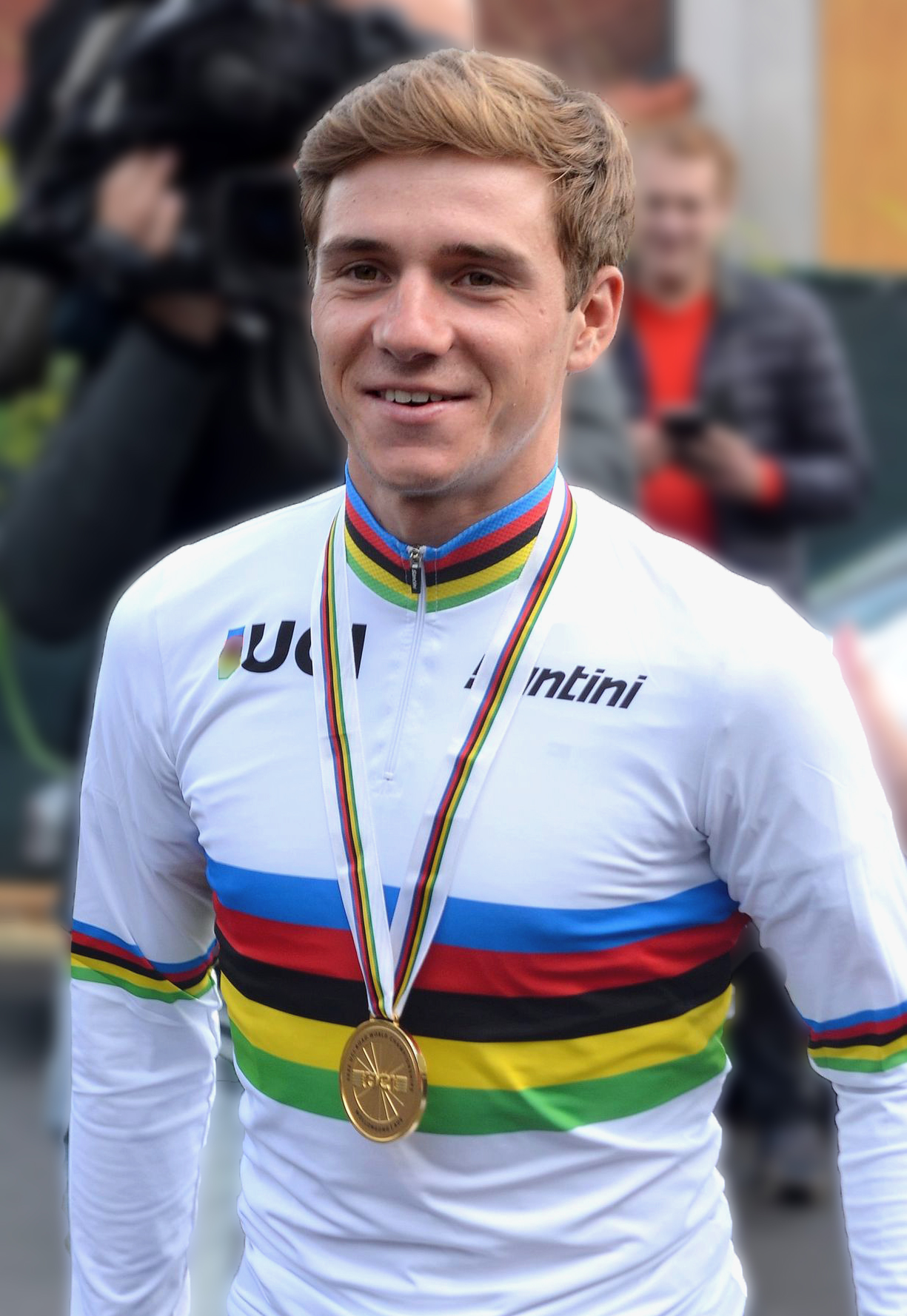
Top: Tadej Pogacar (upper left)
Jonas Vingegaard (upper right)
Bottom: Primož Roglič (lower left)
Remco Evenepoel (lower right)

The Big Four is a nickname for the quartet of professional cyclists Tadej Pogačar, Jonas Vingegaard, Primož Roglič, and Remco Evenepoel, who dominated stage races in road cycling in the early 2020s, particularly at the Grand Tours. (Note: Multiple sources, such as articles by Jim Cotton in VeloNews and Robyn Davison in Cyclist, explicitly analyze the Big Four grouping and its implications. Many other cycling outlets and news agencies have adopted the term in reporting on the riders and relevant races.) Starting with the 2019 Vuelta a España, the four riders have collectively won 14 of 19 Grand Tours, along with many other major stage races. Cycling journalists have described the four as having a "lockdown" on winning cycling's biggest races.

The nickname gained prominence in 2024, particularly in the coverage of the 2024 Tour de France, where all four riders competed. The term reflects the perception that the Big Four are the primary favorites for Grand Tour competition in cycling in the 2020s; relatedly, the Big Four have won every Vélo d'Or, one of cycling's highest individual awards, from 2020 through 2024, with each rider winning at least once (Pogačar won in 2021, 2024, and 2025).

== Origin ==
"cycling’s Big Four, the quartet of generational talents winning pretty much every Grand Tour"

— Chris Marshall-Bell, writing for Rouleur.

The term Big Four or Big 4 was used in cycling media to refer to the quartet in late 2023 and 2024, such as in forecasts for the 2024 Tour de France, where all four riders were expected to compete. A notable early reference came in a January preview for the Tour by Barry Ryan of CyclingNews, who noted "the 2024 Tour has four podium favourites" and quoted Rolf Aldag, directeur sportif for Red Bull–Bora–Hansgrohe, asking: "Wow, when are we going to see the Big Four clashing together with Primož, Jonas, Remco and Tadej?" In June, as the Tour approached, James Shrubsall of Cycling Weekly acknowledged the term's recent use, referencing "the much-talked about 'Big Four'" in his preview and identifying the four riders as leading contenders.

During the race, the term became shorthand to refer to this group of four leading contenders. Media coverage referenced the group directly, for example reporting that Roglič "was the only one of the ‘Big 4’ GC contenders to lose time" on stage 2, or framing analysis around the grouping: "How are the ‘Big Four’ faring heading into the final week[?]"

Following the Tour, where Pogačar, Vingegaard, and Evenepoel comprised the final podium, usage of the nickname persisted. During coverage of the subsequent 2024 Vuelta a España, journalists described the race as much more open due to the absence of three members of the Big Four. Roglič, the sole member competing, won the general classification along with three stage victories.

During the 2025 season, usage of the term continued. Cycling journalists frequently referenced the perceived gap between these four riders and other contenders for Grand Tours. Some analyses have suggested that the Big Four have a "stranglehold on the Grand Tours", and that any "second tier" rider outside the group will need a "twist of fate" to win. Even in races without any Big Four members present, such as the 2025 edition of Tirreno–Adriatico, the term was often used in framing the contenders. All members of the Big Four are expected to ride in the 2025 Tour de France, and are widely considered to be the main pre-race favorites for the general classification.

== Members ==
=== Primož Roglič ===
Primož Roglič (born 1989) is a Slovenian cyclist who rides for Red Bull–Bora–Hansgrohe. Roglič has been called the original member of the Big Four, as he won his first Grand Tour at the 2019 Vuelta a España, the same year the other three members debuted at the UCI WorldTour level. Roglič is significantly older than the other Big Four members, born seven years before the second oldest member Vingegaard. Roglič has won five Grand Tours (four Vuelta, one Giro), and finished second at the Tour in 2020, famously losing the lead to Pogačar on the penultimate stage.

=== Tadej Pogačar ===
Tadej Pogačar (born 1998) is a Slovenian cyclist who rides for UAE Team Emirates XRG. Pogačar won his first Tour de France in 2020 at age 21, becoming the second youngest winner in the race's history. He is widely regarded for his versaility, winning six Grand Tours (five Tour, one Giro), twelve one-day Monuments, and the 2024 UCI World Championship road race. His 2024 season is considered among the greatest in the history of cycling, as he completed the Triple Crown of Cycling along with two Monument wins.

=== Jonas Vingegaard ===
Jonas Vingegaard (born 1996) is a Danish cyclist who rides for Visma–Lease a Bike. Vingegaard started his professional career as a domestique for Roglič, before rising to prominence with a second place finish at the 2021 Tour de France. He then won the next two editions of the Tour de France, beating Pogačar twice. His rivalry with Pogačar is considered to be one of the greatest in cycling's history, and some analysts have argued that Vingegaard and Pogačar should be considered "the Big Two" within the four members, thanks to their achievements in the Tour.

=== Remco Evenepoel ===
Remco Evenepoel (born 2000) is a Belgian cyclist who rides for Red Bull-BORA-hansgrohe. Evenepoel dominated at the junior ranks, before breaking out in the 2022 season, where he won the Vuelta a España as well as the World Championship road race. He is also a renowned time trialist, winning an Olympic gold medal in 2024, and world championships in 2023, 2024 and 2025. Some analysts have questioned Evenepoel's inclusion in the Big Four, stating that while the other three all have multiple Grand Tour victories, Evenepoel is "far less proven at the grand tour level."

== Career statistics ==
The Big Four have won a combined 14 Grand Tours: Roglič and Pogačar with five, Vingegaard with three, and Evenepoel with one. All of these victories have come in a period starting with the 2019 Vuelta a España; since then 19 Grand Tours have been held, with at least one member of the Big Four participating in 17 of them. The three instances where a Big Four rider participated but did not win were two did not finish results (Evenepoel at the 2021 Giro and Roglič at the 2025 Giro) and the 2023 Vuelta a España, where Vingegaard and Roglič finished second and third respectively behind their teammate Sepp Kuss.

Members of the Big Four have also achieved significant success in major one-day championships: collectively, they have won three Olympic gold medals (Roglič: 2020 time trial; Evenepoel: 2024 time trial and road race) and six UCI World Championship titles (Pogačar: 2024 and 2025 road race; Evenepoel: 2022 road race, 2023, 2024 and 2025 time trial).

The following tables show a combined performance timeline for major races, showing the best result of the four members for each race edition.

Key
—	Did not compete
DNF	Did not finish
NH	Not held
Bold	**Bold** denotes a top-3 (podium) finish

General classification combined performance timeline
**Grand Tour general classification results**
Grand Tour	2018	2019	2020	2021	2022	2023	2024	2025	2026
Giro d'Italia	—	**3**	—	DNF	—	**1**	**1**	DNF	**1**
Tour de France	4	—	**1**	**1**	**1**	**1**	**1**	**1**	**1**
Vuelta a España	—	**1**	**1**	**1**	**1**	**2**	**1**	**1**	**2**
**Major stage race general classification results**
Race	2018	2019	2020	2021	2022	2023	2024	2025	2026
Paris–Nice	—	—	—	15	**1**	**1**	**2**	DNF	**1**
Tirreno–Adriatico	29	**1**	—	**1**	**1**	**1**	**1**	—	5
Volta a Catalunya	—	—	NH	—	—	**1**	**1**	**1**	**1**
Tour of the Basque Country	**1**	6	NH	**1**	4	**1**	DNF	—	—
Tour de Romandie	**1**	**1**	NH	—	—	—	—	5	**1**
Critérium du Dauphiné	—	—	4	—	**1**	**1**	**1**	**1**	—
Tour de Suisse	—	—	NH	—	11	3	—	—	**1**

Major championships combined performance timeline
Event		2019	2020	2021	2022	2023	2024	2025
Olympic Games	Time trial	Not held		**1**	Not held		**1**	NH
Olympic Games	Road race	Not held		**3**	Not held		**1**	NH
World Championships	Time trial	**2**	—	**3**	**3**	**1**	**1**	**1**
World Championships	Road race	18	6	37	**1**	**3**	**1**	**1**

== See also ==
- Big Three (tennis)
- Big Four (tennis)
