= 2024 UCI Road World Championships – Men's time trial =

Cycling event

Men's time trial
2024 UCI Road World Championships
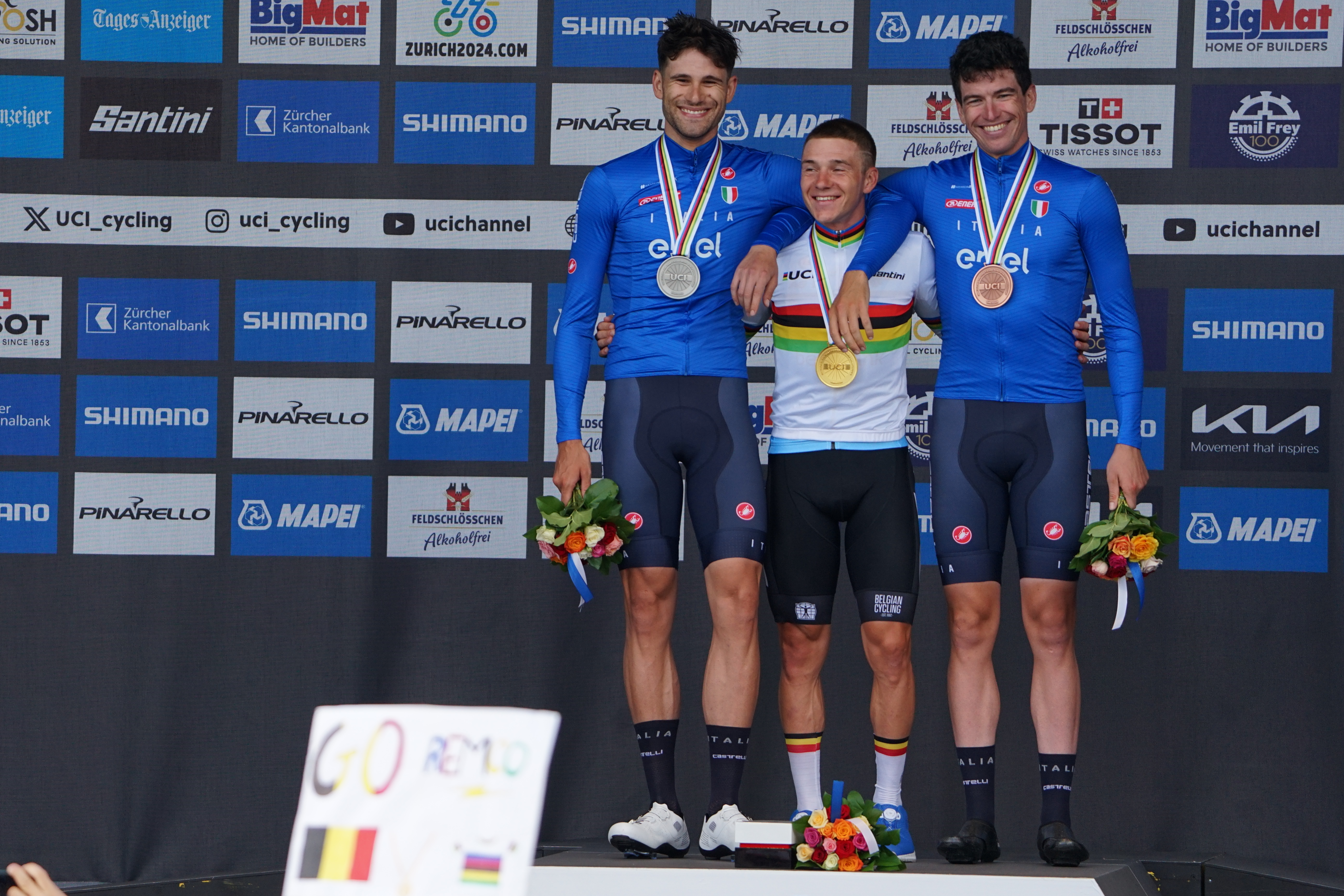
- The podium

Race details
- Dates: 22 September 2024
- Distance: 46.1 km (28.65 mi)
- Winning time: 53:01.98

Medalists
	Gold	(Belgium) Remco Evenepoel (BEL)
	Silver	(Italy) Filippo Ganna (ITA)
	Bronze	(Italy) Edoardo Affini (ITA)

The Men's time trial of the 2024 UCI Road World Championships was a cycling event that took place on 22 September 2024 in Zurich, Switzerland. It was the 31st edition of the championship, for which Remco Evenepoel of Belgium was the defending champion, having won in 2023.

== Continental champions ==
Name	Country	Reason
Remco Evenepoel	Belgium	Incumbent World Champion
Charles Kagimu	Uganda	African Champion
Yevgeniy Fedorov	Kazakhstan	Asian Champion
Edoardo Affini	Italy	European Champion
Aaron Gate	New Zealand	Oceanian Champion
Walter Vargas	Colombia	Panamerican Champion

== Final classification ==
Pos.	Position in the time trial
Time	Time taken to complete the time trial
Diff	Deficit to the winner of the time trial
DNS	Denotes a rider who did not start
DNF	Denotes a rider who did not finish
DSQ	Denotes a rider who was disqualified from the race
OTL	Denotes a rider who finished outside the time limit

Rank	Rider	Country	Time	Diff.
1st place, gold medalist(s)	Remco Evenepoel	Belgium	53:01.98	
2nd place, silver medalist(s)	Filippo Ganna	Italy	53:08.41	+ 6.43
3rd place, bronze medalist(s)	Edoardo Affini	Italy	53:56.42	+ 54.44
4	Josh Tarling	Great Britain	54:19.61	+ 1:17.63
5	Jay Vine	Australia	54:26.16	+ 1:24.18
6	Kasper Asgreen	Denmark	54:32.09	+ 1:30.11
7	Tobias Foss	Norway	54:46.48	+ 1:44.50
8	Stefan Küng	Switzerland	54:50.32	+ 1:48.34
9	Victor Campenaerts	Belgium	54:57.14	+ 1:55.16
10	Brandon McNulty	United States	55:00.01	+ 1:58.03
11	Bruno Armirail	France	55:06.15	+ 2:04.17
12	Primož Roglič	Slovenia	55:08.50	+ 2:06.52
13	Magnus Sheffield	United States	55:10.42	+ 2:08.44
14	Mikkel Bjerg	Denmark	55:15.57	+ 2:13.59
15	Nelson Oliveira	Portugal	55:37.86	+ 2:35.88
16	Søren Wærenskjold	Norway	55:42.27	+ 2:40.29
17	Daan Hoole	Netherlands	55:45.81	+ 2:43.83
18	Walter Vargas	Colombia	55:57.73	+ 2:55.75
19	Pier-André Côté	Canada	56:00.30	+ 2:58.32
20	Miguel Heidemann	Germany	56:06.66	+ 3:04.68
21	Thibault Guernalec	France	56:15.17	+ 3:13.19
22	Derek Gee	Canada	56:18.00	+ 3:16.02
23	Max Schachmann	Germany	56:21.07	+ 3:19.09
24	João Almeida	Portugal	56:21.13	+ 3:19.15
25	David de la Cruz	Spain	56:28.29	+ 3:26.31
26	Raúl García Pierna	Spain	56:38.43	+ 3:36.45
27	Mathias Vacek	Czech Republic	56:47.96	+ 3:45.98
28	Filip Maciejuk	Poland	56:48.98	+ 3:47.00
29	Stefan Bissegger	Switzerland	57:06.95	+ 4:04.97
30	Yevgeniy Fedorov	Kazakhstan	57:17.97	+ 4:15.99
31	Andreas Miltiadis	Cyprus	57:35.17	+ 4:33.19
32	Kaden Hopkins	Bermuda	57:39.40	+ 4:37.42
33	Barnabás Peák	Hungary	58:19.48	+ 5:17.50
34	Carlos Oyarzún	Chile	58:26.36	+ 5:24.38
35	Vitaliy Hryniv	Ukraine	58:52.49	+ 5:50.51
36	János Pelikán	Hungary	59:01.15	+ 5:59.17
37	Batsaikhany Tegshbayar	Mongolia	59:21.95	+ 6:19.97
38	Charles Kagimu	Uganda	59:28.98	+ 6:27.00
39	Conor White	Bermuda	59:32.23	+ 6:30.25
40	Ognjen Ilić	Serbia	1:00:34.82	+ 7:32.84
41	Sergio Chumil	Guatemala	1:00:45.30	+ 7:43.32
42	Amir Ansari	Athlete Refugee Team	1:01:00.67	+ 7:58.69
43	Igor Chzhan	Kazakhstan	1:01:29.05	+ 8:27.07
44	Miao Chengshuo	China	1:01:32.73	+ 8:30.75
45	Taavi Kannimäe	Estonia	1:02:22.13	+ 9:20.15
46	Martin Papanov	Bulgaria	1:02:56.93	+ 9:54.95
47	Ahmad Wais	Athlete Refugee Team	1:02:57.62	+ 9:55.64
48	Diego de Jesus Mendes	Brazil	1:03:11.27	+ 10:09.29
49	Cory Williams	Belize	1:03:51.48	+ 10:49.50
50	Emil Stoynev	Bulgaria	1:04:38.40	+ 11:36.42
51	Richard Laizer	Tanzania	1:07:12.03	+ 14:10.05
52	Fadhel Al-Khater	Qatar	1:07:55.50	+ 14:53.52
53	Tamin Al-Kuwari	Qatar	1:09:26.47	+ 16:24.49
54	Fred Matute	Honduras	1:09:38.67	+ 16:36.69
55	Francisco Daniel Riveros	Paraguay	1:10:07.24	+ 17:05.26
56	Qais Haidari	Afghanistan	1:10:32.75	+ 17:30.77
57	Ahmad Mirzaee	Afghanistan	1:11:08.75	+ 18:06.77
58	Edward Oingerang	Guam	1:13:55.89	+ 20:53.91
59	Christopher Symonds	Ghana	1:16:26.18	+ 23:24.20
