= Josh Tarling =

British cyclist (born 2004)

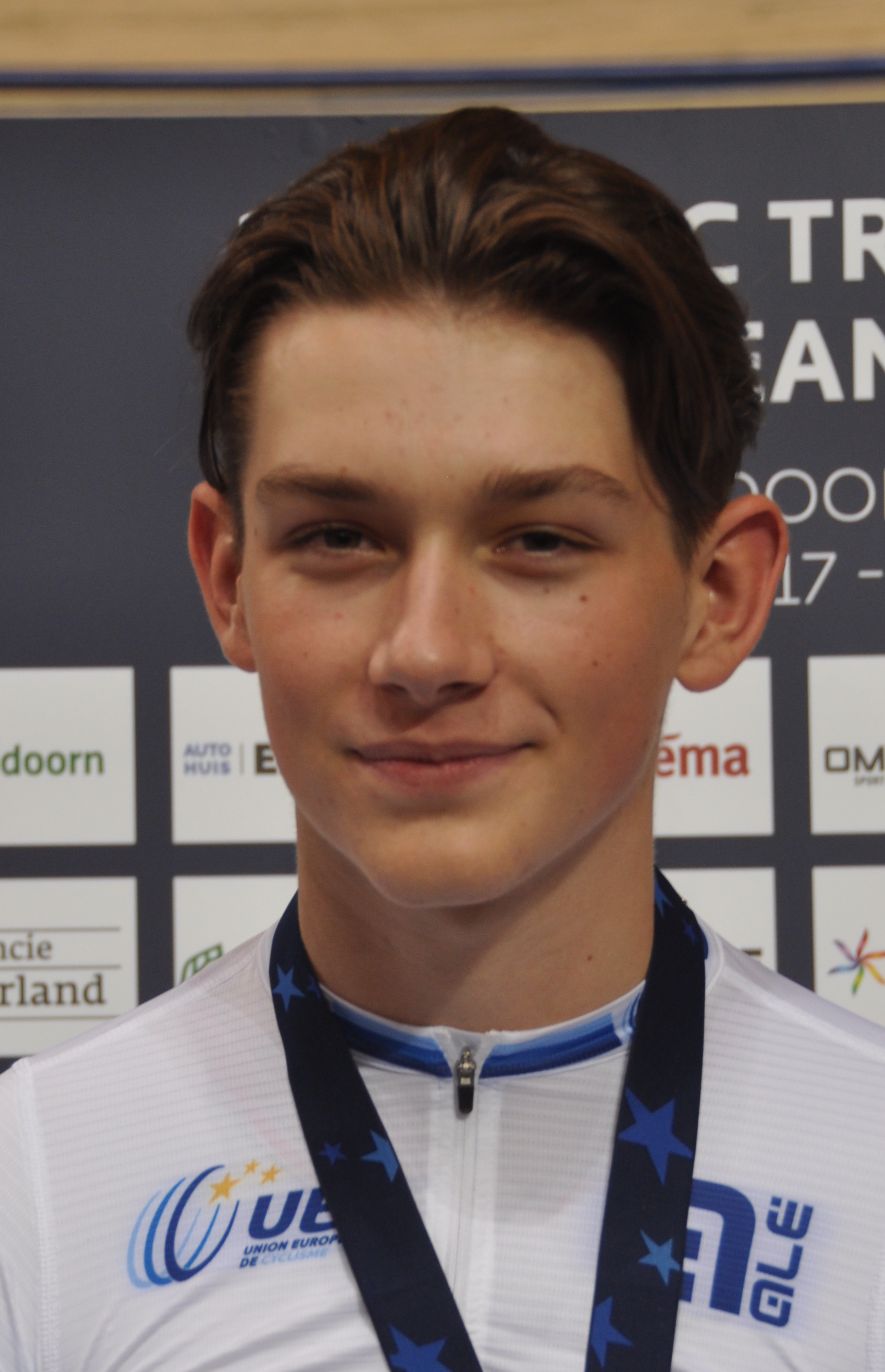
- Tarling in 2021

Personal information
- Full name: Joshua Michael Tarling
- Born: 15 February 2004 (age 22) Cheltenham, Gloucestershire, England
- Height: 1.94 m (6 ft 4 in)
- Weight: 78 kg (172 lb)

Cycling career
- Sport: Cycling
- Current team: Netcompany–Ineos
- Disciplines: Track; Road
- Role: Rider
- Rider type: Time Trialist

Amateur team
- 2021–2022: FlandersColor Galloo

Professional team
- 2023–: INEOS Grenadiers

Major wins
- Road Grand Tours Giro d'Italia 1 individual stage (2025) One-day races and Classics European Time Trial Championships (2023) National Time Trial Championships (2023, 2024) Track World Championships Points race (2025)
Medal record
Representing Great Britain
Men's road bicycle racing
World Road Championships
Gold medal – first place	2022 Wollongong	Junior time trial
Silver medal – second place	2021 Flanders	Junior time trial
Bronze medal – third place	2023 Stirling	Elite time trial
European Championships
Gold medal – first place	2023 Drenthe	Elite time trial
Men's track cycling
UCI World Championships
Gold medal – first place	2025 Santiago	Points race
Silver medal – second place	2025 Santiago	Madison
European Junior Championships
Gold medal – first place	2021 Apeldoorn	Omnium
Gold medal – first place	2021 Apeldoorn	Team pursuit
Bronze medal – third place	2022 Anadia	Individual pursuit
Bronze medal – third place	2022 Anadia	Team pursuit
Bronze medal – third place	2022 Anadia	Madison

Joshua Michael Tarling (born 15 February 2004) is a Welsh track and road cyclist who rides for UCI WorldTeam Netcompany–Ineos. He is the 2025 World champion in the points race. A World Junior champion in the time trial, he won the elite time trial at the 2023 European Road Cycling Championships at the age of 19.

== Background ==
Joshua Michael Tarling was born in Cheltenham, Gloucestershire, England on 15 February 2004, and grew up in Aberaeron, Ceredigion, west Wales. He speaks English and Welsh. He had a younger brother, Finlay Tarling, who was also a cyclist, and who died in a collision during the 2026 Volta a Portugal. Their father, Michael, is a keen cyclist who used to race at Newport Velodrome. In 2012, Tarling’s parents started the West Wales Cycle Racing Team, in part to address the lack of cycling clubs in the area.

Tarling started racing when he was around six years old. He has described that he was “pretty much a full-time cyclist from the age of 10”, travelling across the UK and Europe with his family for races. He raced his first time trial when he was 12 years old. Tarling has moved from Wales to Andorra since turning professional in 2023.

== Cycling career ==
=== Early career ===
Tarling became a double British champion when winning the points and team pursuit events at the 2022 British National Track Championships.

He won the World junior time trial championship in 2022, having won the silver medal in 2021.

=== Ineos Grenadiers (2023–) ===
For the 2023 season, Tarling joined UCI WorldTeam Netcompany–Ineos on a three-year contract.

His first race with the team was the Étoile de Bessèges in February; he finished 56th overall but finished second in the final stage time trial, which was won by Mads Pedersen. In March, Tarling competed in Paris–Nice; he made the Stage 7 breakaway group but had to abandon after crashing on a descent. Later that month he started his first elite classic, the E3 Saxo Classic, though he did not finish. In April he competed in his first monument, the Paris–Roubaix. Though he missed the time cut by six minutes, he finished the course, making him – at the age of 19 – the youngest rider to finish the men’s race in 86 years.

In June, aged 19, Tarling became the youngest winner of the British national elite men's time trial championship. The following month he raced in the Tour de Wallonie. He won the Youth Classification and finished second overall, beaten only by Ineos teammate Filippo Ganna. He finished second on the Stage 4 time-trial, which was also won by Ganna. In August, Tarling finished third in the time trial at the UCI Road World Championships behind Remco Evenepoel and Ganna. On 20 September 2023 he won the European Time Trial Championships, beating Stefan Bissegger and Wout Van Aert to the gold medal. In October, Tarling rounded out his road racing season with a win at Chrono des Nations, beating Evenepoel by 13 seconds and Bissegger in third place by more than a minute.

In February 2024, Tarling competed at the first round of the UCI Track Nations Cup in Adelaide, Australia. He took bronze in the madison with Ollie Wood and won gold in the team pursuit alongside William Tidball, Rhys Britton and Charlie Tanfield. Later that month, Tarling won the opening time trial of the O Gran Camiño, beating second-place finisher Darren Rafferty by 42 seconds.

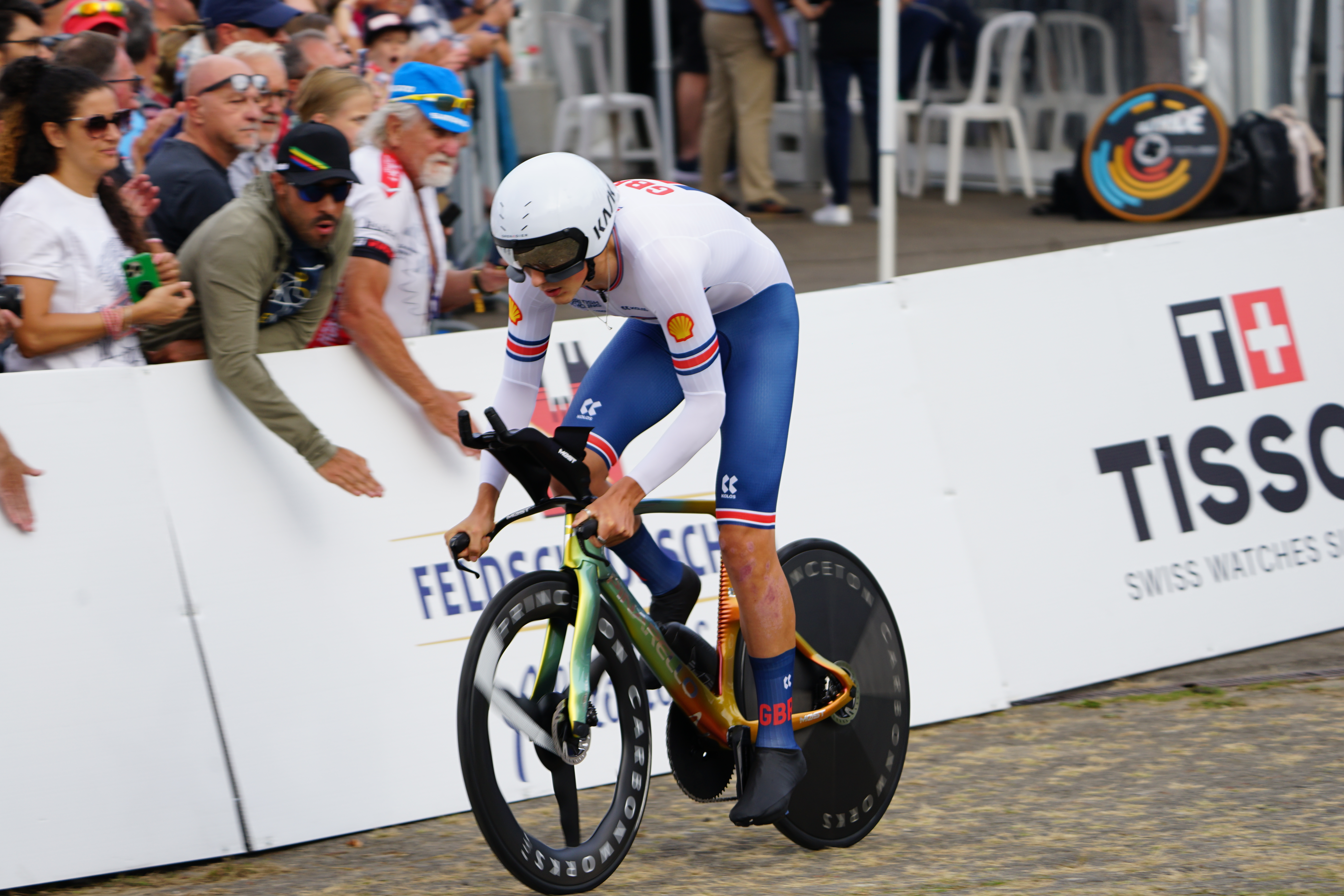
Tarling at the 2024 UCI Road World Championships – Men's time trial

Tarling raced in the Dwars door Vlaanderen in March, finishing in sixth position after a dramatic race, 44 seconds behind race winner Matteo Jorgenson. He followed this up with a 17th place finish at the Tour of Flanders – his second monument race – four days later. In April, Tarling was on the start line of Paris–Roubaix for a second time, however he was disqualified midway through the race for taking an illegal tow from the Ineos team car following a mechanical issue. In June, he raced in the Critérium du Dauphiné, where he finished 46th overall and came second in the Stage 4 time-trial to Remco Evenepoel. Later that month Tarling defended his National Time Trial title, beating runner-up Max Walker by more than a minute.

On 24 June 2024, it was announced that Tarling would be part of the Team GB squad competing at the 2024 Olympic Games in Paris. He came fourth in the time trial having suffered a puncture, finishing just 2.16 seconds outside the medal placings. He also competed in the road race a week later, crossing the line in 47th place with the peloton.

In early July 2024, Tarling signed a new three-year contract with Ineos, extending his stint with the team until the end of 2027. On 13 August the team announced that Tarling would be making his Grand Tour debut at the Vuelta a España, which was followed by expectations that he would perform well in the two time trial stages at the start and end of the race. He finished in sixth place on the Stage 1 time trial, 8 seconds back from stage winner Brandon McNulty. On Stage 9, Tarling crashed on a technical descent; while he was initially able to continue, he abandoned the race a few kilometres later.

In September, Tarling was selected for the Great Britain team at the 2024 UCI Road World Championships. He competed in the time trial and finished fourth, beaten to the podium by Evenepoel, Ganna and Edoardo Affini.

On 7 October 2024 it was announced that Tarling had been selected for the UCI Track Cycling World Championships. He was forced to withdraw shortly before the event due to injuries sustained at the CRO Race earlier in the month.

On 24 October 2025, at the UCI Track Cycling World Championships in Santiago, Chile, Tarling won the men's points race to take the world title. He then won a silver medal in the madison partnering Mark Stewart.

== Major results ==
=== Road ===
2021
2nd Time trial, UCI World Junior Championships
2nd Time trial, National Junior Championships
2nd Overall Driedaagse van Axel

1st Stage 2a (ITT)

3rd Grand Prix Bob Jungels
2022
1st Time trial, UCI World Junior Championships
1st Time trial, National Junior Championships
1st Overall Tour de Gironde

1st Stage 1a (ITT)

1st Chrono des Nations Juniors
1st Stage 3a (ITT) Saarland Trofeo
2nd Overall Junior Tour of Wales

1st Stages 1 (ITT) & 5

6th Overall Trophée Centre Morbihan

1st Mountains classification
1st Stage 2a (ITT)

2023 (4 pro wins)
1st Time trial, UEC European Championships
1st Time trial, National Championships
1st Chrono des Nations
1st Stage 2 (ITT) Renewi Tour
2nd Overall Tour de Wallonie

1st Young rider classification

3rd Time trial, UCI World Championships
2024 (2)
1st Time trial, National Championships
1st Stage 1 (ITT) O Gran Camiño
2nd Road race, National Under-23 Championships
4th Time trial, Olympic Games
4th Time trial, UCI World Championships
6th Dwars door Vlaanderen
2025 (3)
1st Chrono des Nations
1st Stage 2 (ITT) Giro d'Italia
1st Stage 2 (ITT) UAE Tour
5th Time trial, UEC European Championships
2026
1st Stage 3 (TTT) Paris–Nice
Vuelta a España

Held after Stage 1

==== Grand Tour general classification results timeline ====
Grand Tour	2024	2025	2026
Giro d'Italia	—	DNF	—
Tour de France	—	—	120
Vuelta a España	DNF	—	

===== Major championships timeline =====
Event		2023	2024	2025
Olympic Games	Time trial	NH	4	NH
Olympic Games	Road race	NH	47	NH
World Championships	Time trial	3	4	—
World Championships	Road race	—	—	—
European Championships	Time trial	1	—	5
European Championships	Road race	DNF	—	
National Championships	Time trial	1	1	—
National Championships	Road race	DNF	7	—

Legend
—	Did not compete
DNF	Did not finish

=== Track ===
2021
UEC European Junior Championships

1st Omnium
1st Team pursuit

National Junior Championships

1st Points race
2nd Madison (with Josh Charlton)
3rd Individual pursuit
3rd Scratch

2022
National Championships

1st Team pursuit
1st Points race

UEC European Junior Championships

3rd Individual pursuit
3rd Team pursuit
3rd Madison (with Dylan Hicks)

2023
UEC European Under-23 Championships

1st Team pursuit
3rd Individual pursuit

2024
UCI Nations Cup

1st Team pursuit, Adelaide
3rd Madison, Adelaide (with Oli Wood)

2025
UCI World Championships

1st Points race
2nd Madison (with Mark Stewart)
