= Tobias Foss =

Norwegian cyclist (born 1997)

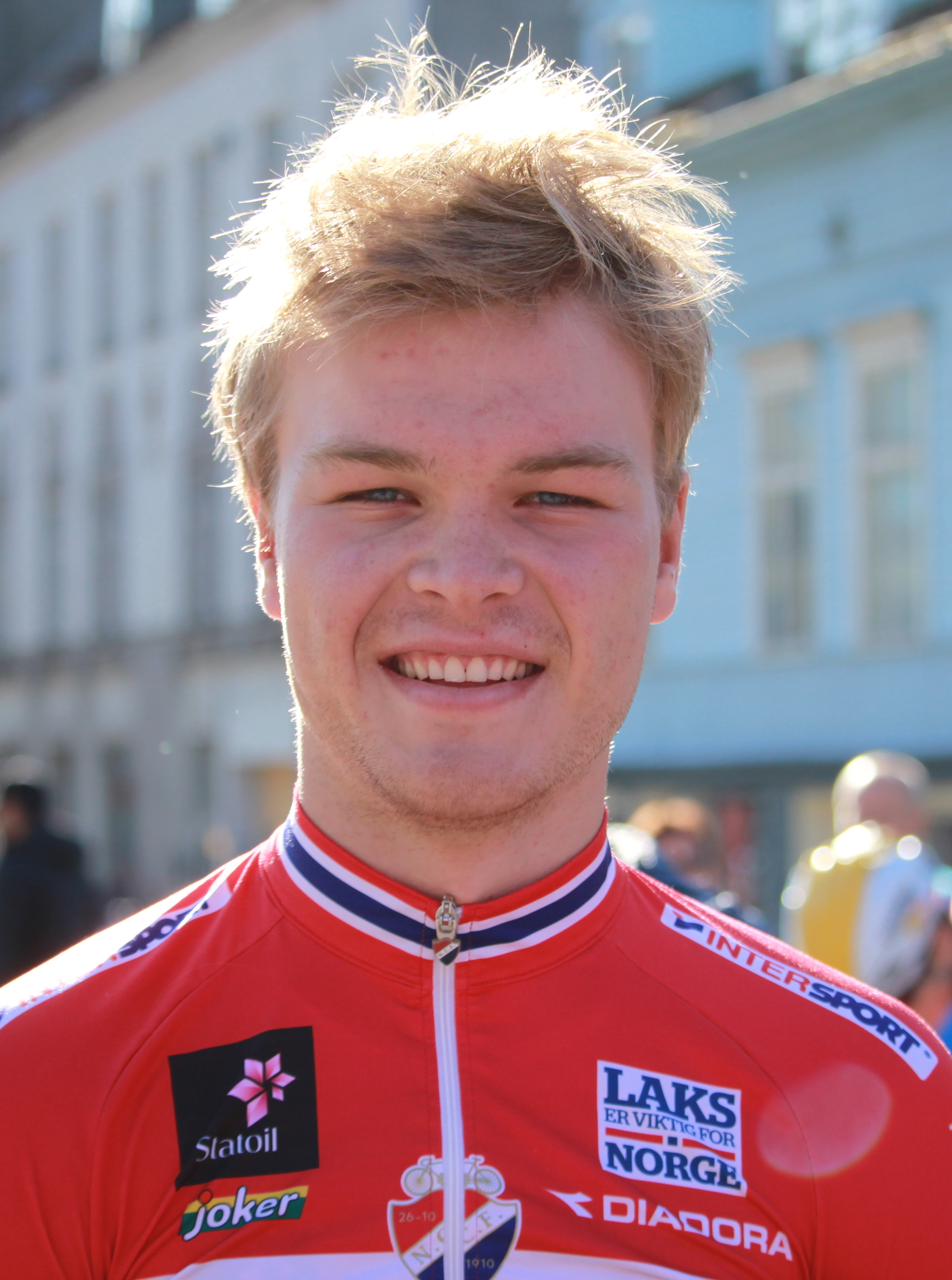
- Foss in 2017

Personal information
- Full name: Tobias Svendsen Foss
- Born: 25 May 1997 (age 29) Vingrom, Norway
- Height: 1.84 m (6 ft 0 in)
- Weight: 74 kg (163 lb)

Cycling career
- Sport: Cycling
- Current team: Netcompany–Ineos
- Discipline: Road
- Role: Rider
- Rider type: All Rounder, Time trialist

Amateur teams
- 2016: Lillehammer CK
- 2016: Team Joker Byggtorget (stagiaire)

Professional teams
- 2017: Joker Icopal
- 2018–2019: Uno-X Norwegian Development Team
- 2020–2023: Team Jumbo–Visma
- 2024–: INEOS Grenadiers

Major wins
- One-day races and Classics World Time Trial Championships (2022) National Road Race Championships (2021) National Time Trial Championships (2021, 2022, 2025, 2026)
Medal record
Men's road bicycle racing
Representing Norway
World Championships
Gold medal – first place	2022 Wollongong	Elite time trial
European Championships
Silver medal – second place	2015 Tartu	Junior time trial
Bronze medal – third place	2014 Nyon	Junior time trial

Tobias Svendsen Foss (born 25 May 1997) is a Norwegian cyclist, who currently rides for UCI WorldTeam Netcompany–Ineos.

== Career ==
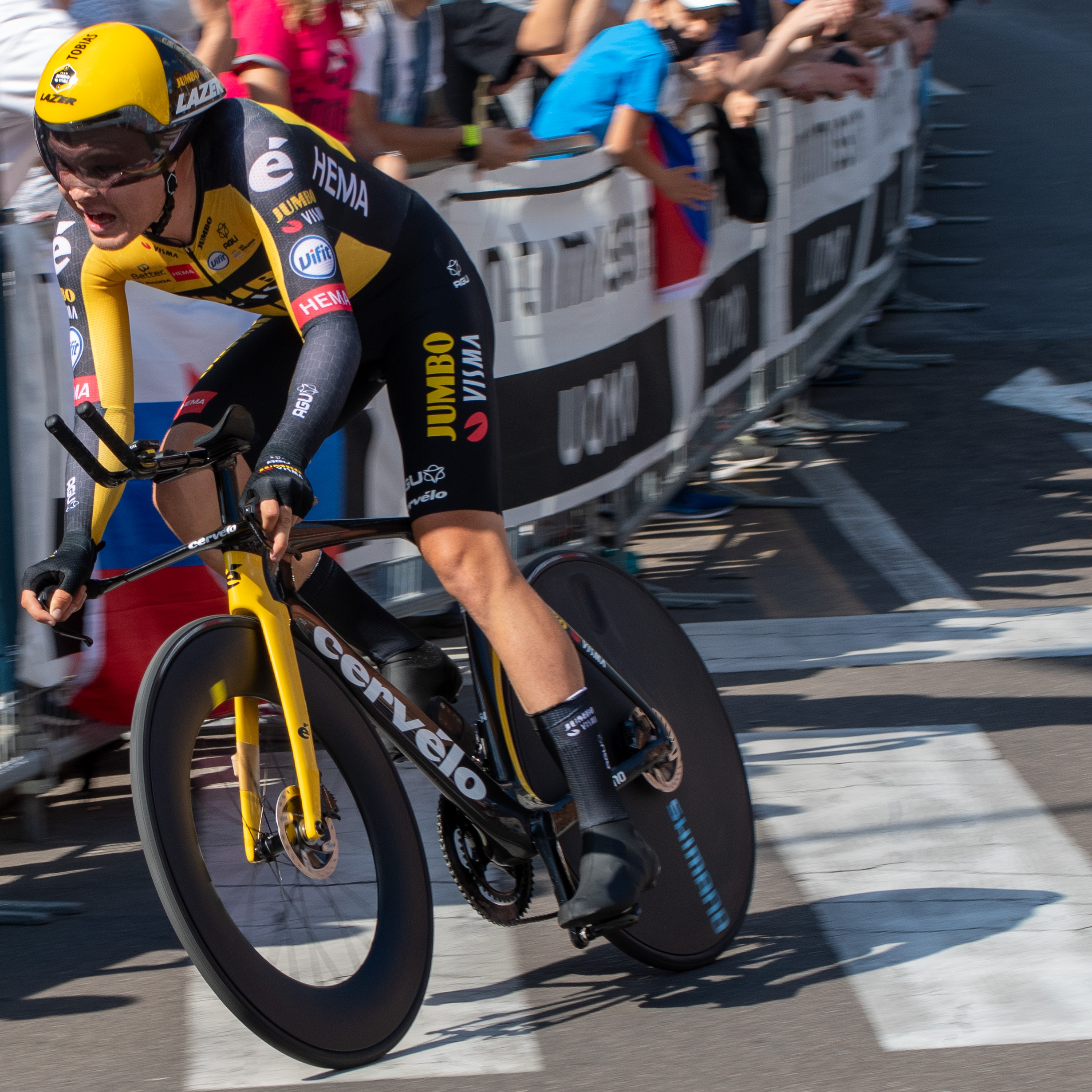
Foss at the 2021 Giro d'Italia

In July 2019, it was announced that Foss would join UCI WorldTeam Team Jumbo–Visma on a two-year contract from 2020. In August 2019, Foss became the first Norwegian to win the Tour de l'Avenir. In October 2020, he was named in the startlist for the 2020 Giro d'Italia. In 2021 he won the National Championships in the road race and time trial and once again rode the Giro where he placed in the top 10.

In 2022, he won a shocking victory in the time trial at the UCI Road World Championships in Wollongong, beating out favorites including Stefan Küng, Remco Evenepoel and Filippo Ganna. This also made him the first ever Norwegian to win the title.

== Major results ==
2014
National Junior Road Championships

1st Team time trial
2nd Time trial
2nd Criterium
3rd Road race

3rd Time trial, UEC European Junior Road Championships
8th Overall Trophée Centre Morbihan
2015
National Junior Road Championships

1st Road race
1st Time trial
1st Team time trial

2nd Time trial, UEC European Junior Road Championships
6th Overall Trophée Centre Morbihan
8th Time trial, UCI Junior Road World Championships
2016
1st Time trial, National Under-23 Road Championships
3rd Overall ZLM Tour

1st Stage 1 (TTT)

4th Himmerland Rundt
2017
1st Young rider classification, Tour of Norway
7th Overall Tour de l'Avenir
2018
4th Time trial, National Road Championships
6th Time trial, UCI Road World Under-23 Championships
6th Overall Okolo Slovenska

1st Young rider classification

8th Hafjell GP
9th Overall Tour de l'Avenir
10th Piccolo Giro di Lombardia
2019
1st Overall Tour de l'Avenir
3rd Liège–Bastogne–Liège Espoirs
4th Overall Volta ao Alentejo

1st Young rider classification

4th Overall Le Triptyque des Monts et Châteaux
4th Hafjell GP
6th Road race, UCI Road World Under-23 Championships
7th Kattekoers
2020
2nd Time trial, National Road Championships
5th Overall Tour de Hongrie
2021 (2 pro wins)
National Road Championships

1st Road race
1st Time trial

9th Overall Giro d'Italia
2022 (2)
1st Time trial, UCI Road World Championships
1st Time trial, National Road Championships
2nd Chrono des Nations
6th Overall Volta ao Algarve
2023
1st Stage 3 (TTT) Paris–Nice
4th Overall Volta ao Algarve
2024 (1)
Tour of the Alps

1st Points classification
1st Stage 1

2nd Time trial, National Road Championships
7th Time trial, UCI Road World Championships
2025 (1)
1st Time trial, National Road Championships
9th Overall Paris–Nice
2026 (1)
1st Time trial, National Road Championships
4th Overall Tour de Suisse

=== Grand Tour general classification results timeline ===
Grand Tour	2020	2021	2022	2023	2024	2025
Giro d'Italia	DNF	9	54	—	79	—
Tour de France	—	—	—	—	—	70
Vuelta a España	—	—	—	—	—	—

=== Major championships timeline ===
Event		2016	2017	2018	2019	2020	2021	2022	2023	2024	2025
Olympic Games	Road race	—	Not held				61	Not held		74	NH
Olympic Games	Time trial	—	Not held				23	Not held		13	NH
World Championships	Road race	—	—	—	—	—	—	84	—	DNF	—
World Championships	Time trial	—	—	—	—	—	—	1	11	7	—
National Championships	Road race	41	37	55	23	19	1	8	—	DNS	7
National Championships	Time trial	11	5	4	13	2	1	1	—	2	1

Legend
—	Did not compete
DNF	Did not finish
DNS	Did not start
IP	Event in progress
NH	Event not held
