= Cycling at the 2024 Summer Olympics – Men's individual road race =

Men's individual road race at the Games of the XXXIII Olympiad
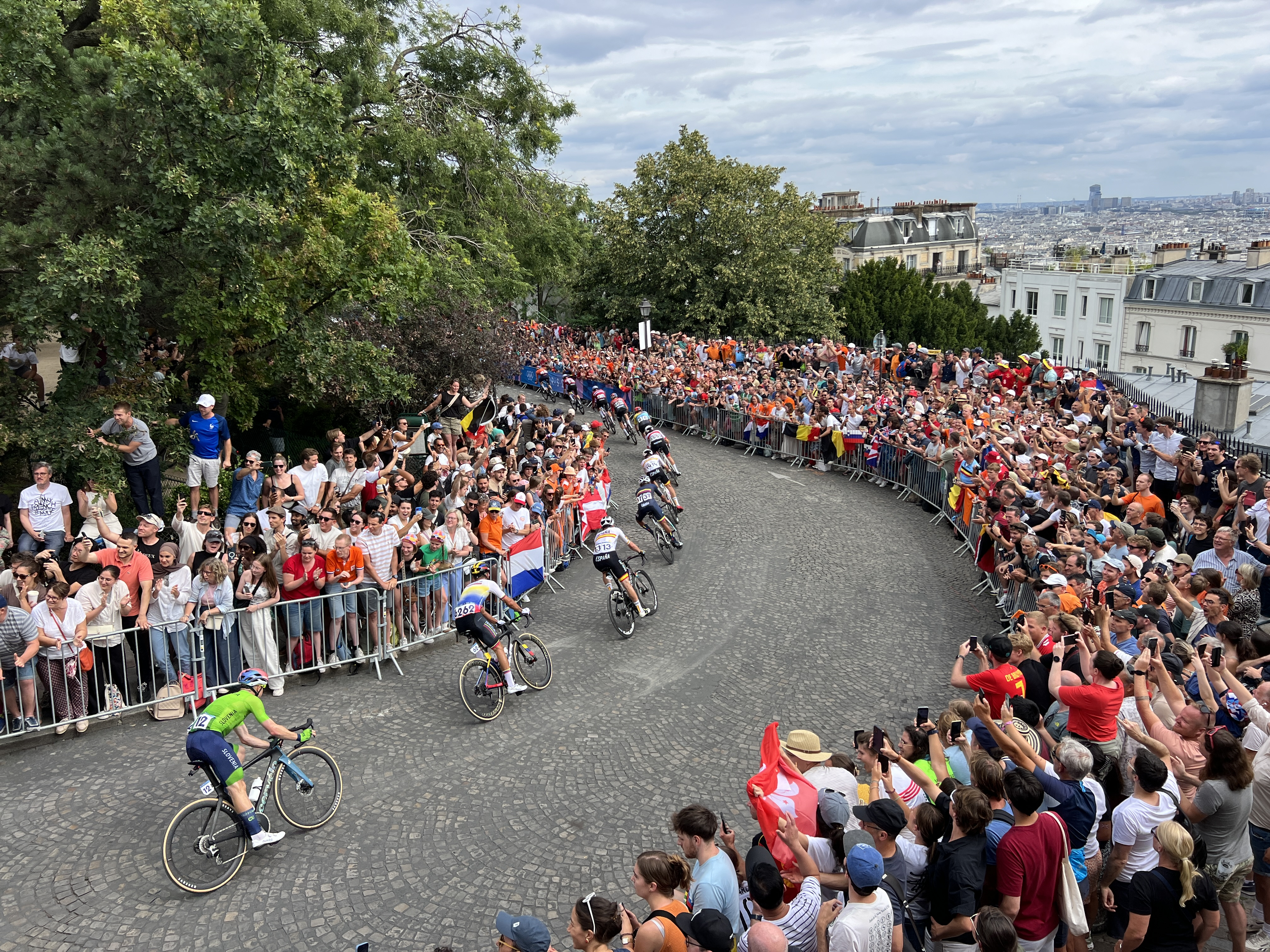
- The second chase group descends from Montmartre on Rue Saint-Éleuthère
- Venues: Île-de-France
- Date: 3 August 2024
- Competitors: 90 from 53 nations

Medalists
1st place, gold medalist(s)		Remco Evenepoel	Belgium
2nd place, silver medalist(s)		Valentin Madouas	France
3rd place, bronze medalist(s)		Christophe Laporte	France

The men's individual road race event at the 2024 Summer Olympics took place on 3 August 2024 on a course that started at Pont d'Iéna in Paris. Gold medal winner Remco Evenepoel had won the men's time trial event on July 27, making him the only male cyclist to win both the road race and the road time trial at the same Summer Olympic Games. The 273 kilometer course through the streets of Paris was the longest Olympic road race to date.

== Background ==
This was the 22nd appearance of the event, initially held in 1896 and then at every Summer Olympics since 1936. It replaced the individual time trial event that had been held from 1912 to 1932; the time trial was re-introduced in 1996 alongside the road race.

== Qualification ==
Mauritius competed in the event for the first time.

== Competition format and course ==
The road race was a mass-start, one-day road race event over 272.1 km (169.1 mi) and 2,800 m (9,200 ft) of vertical gain. The race went through Trocadero, Left Bank, Versailles, Bougival, Feucherolles, Beynes, Montigny-le-Bretonneux, Auffargisis, and then back to Paris, with two loops of the city and three climbs of Montmartre.

== Race overview ==
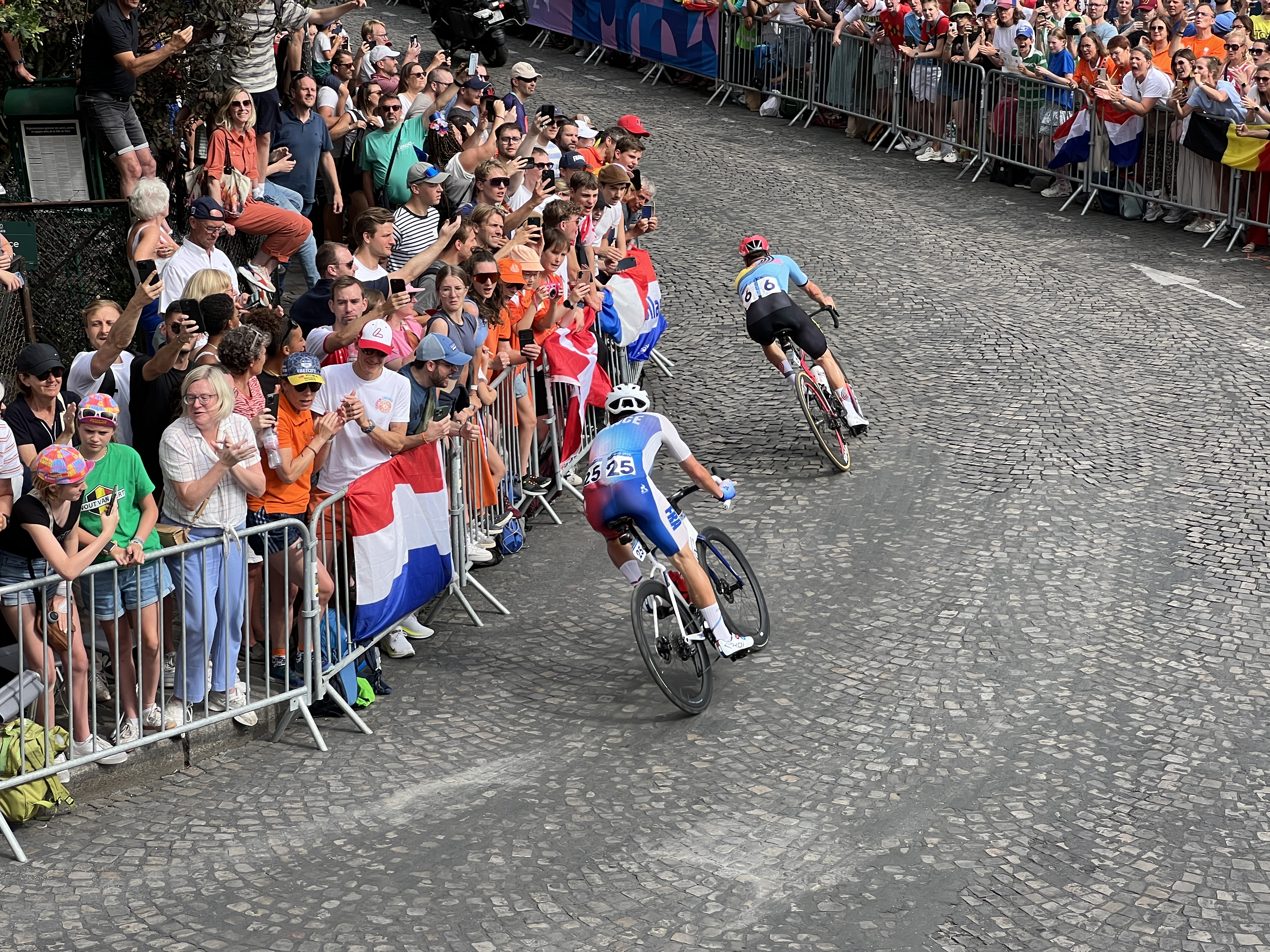
Remco Evenepoel (Belgium) and Valentin Madouas (France) battle for first place in the streets of Montmartre.

The 273-km parcours was the longest in Olympic history, with the smallest-ever Olympic peloton; the race had ninety starters. Reigning Olympic champion Richard Carapaz was not selected for the one Ecuadorian place in the race, as his climbing abilities which had helped him win over Mount Fuji in 2021 were not seen as suitable for a course that clearly favoured the classics riders, with multiple short, sharp ascents culminating in multiple ascents at Montmartre creating the template for a broken up race and a classic riders day. With the withdrawal of 2024 Tour de France winner and the 2021 bronze medalist Tadej Pogačar over fatigue and federation issues, the favourites going into the race included time-trial gold medalist Remco Evenepoel of Belgium and his compatriots Wout van Aert and Jasper Stuyven, reigning world champion Mathieu van der Poel of the Netherlands, France's former double World champion Julian Alaphilippe, the Dane Mattias Skjelmose, Great Britain's mountain-bike double gold medalist Tom Pidcock and Irish classics rider Ben Healy.

Despite a dramatic late puncture 3.8 km from the finish line, Remco Evenepoel became the first male cyclist to win the road race and time trial Olympic double, catching early animaters of the race including Ben Healy, before overpowering all his major rivals, notably Valentin Madouas of France over the last few climbs to race and win solo. Madouas hung on for silver; his French colleague Christophe Laporte stayed in the peloton and won bronze from a small bunch sprint, with several pre-race favourites only a few seconds behind.

== Results ==
Result
Rank	#	Cyclist	Nation	Time	Diff.
1st place, gold medalist(s)	6	Remco Evenepoel	Belgium	6:19:34	
2nd place, silver medalist(s)	25	Valentin Madouas	France	6:20:45	+ 1:11
3rd place, bronze medalist(s)	24	Christophe Laporte	France	6:20:50	+ 1:16
4	67	Attila Valter	Hungary	6:20:50	+ 1:16
5	60	Toms Skujiņš	Latvia	6:20:50	+ 1:16
6	56	Marco Haller	Austria	6:20:50	+ 1:16
7	40	Stefan Küng	Switzerland	6:20:50	+ 1:16
8	12	Jan Tratnik	Slovenia	6:20:50	+ 1:16
9	31	Matteo Jorgenson	United States	6:20:50	+ 1:16
10	51	Ben Healy	Ireland	6:20:54	+ 1:20
11	23	Julian Alaphilippe	France	6:20:59	+ 1:25
12	1	Mathieu van der Poel	Netherlands	6:21:23	+ 1:49
13	27	Tom Pidcock	Great Britain	6:21:24	+ 1:50
14	61	Mathias Vacek	Czech Republic	6:21:25	+ 1:51
15	35	Michael Matthews	Australia	6:21:47	+ 2:13
16	39	Marc Hirschi	Switzerland	6:21:47	+ 2:13
17	19	Mattias Skjelmose	Denmark	6:21:47	+ 2:13
18	13	Alex Aranburu	Spain	6:21:47	+ 2:13
19	37	Santiago Buitrago	Colombia	6:21:49	+ 2:15
20	18	Mads Pedersen	Denmark	6:21:54	+ 2:20
21	7	Jasper Stuyven	Belgium	6:21:54	+ 2:20
22	14	Juan Ayuso	Spain	6:21:54	+ 2:20
23	20	Alberto Bettiol	Italy	6:21:54	+ 2:20
24	32	Brandon McNulty	United States	6:21:54	+ 2:20
25	38	Daniel Martínez	Colombia	6:21:54	+ 2:20
26	55	Felix Großschartner	Austria	6:21:54	+ 2:20
27	48	Corbin Strong	New Zealand	6:21:54	+ 2:20
28	44	Max Schachmann	Germany	6:21:54	+ 2:20
29	75	Lukáš Kubiš	Slovakia	6:23:16	+ 3:42
30	65	Madis Mihkels	Estonia	6:23:16	+ 3:42
31	29	Stephen Williams	Great Britain	6:23:16	+ 3:42
32	34	Simon Clarke	Australia	6:23:16	+ 3:42
33	46	Nelson Oliveira	Portugal	6:23:16	+ 3:42
34	26	Kévin Vauquelin	France	6:23:16	+ 3:42
35	15	Oier Lazkano	Spain	6:23:16	+ 3:42
36	3	Dylan van Baarle	Netherlands	6:23:16	+ 3:42
37	8	Wout van Aert	Belgium	6:23:21	+ 3:47
38	9	Luka Mezgec	Slovenia	6:26:57	+ 7:23
39	47	Laurence Pithie	New Zealand	6:26:57	+ 7:23
40	63	Alex Kirsch	Luxembourg	6:26:57	+ 7:23
41	59	Michael Woods	Canada	6:26:57	+ 7:23
42	33	Magnus Sheffield	United States	6:26:57	+ 7:23
43	30	Fred Wright	Great Britain	6:26:57	+ 7:23
44	58	Derek Gee	Canada	6:26:57	+ 7:23
45	4	Jhonatan Narváez	Ecuador	6:26:57	+ 7:23
46	45	Rui Costa	Portugal	6:26:57	+ 7:23
47	28	Josh Tarling	Great Britain	6:26:57	+ 7:23
48	5	Tiesj Benoot	Belgium	6:26:57	+ 7:23
49	49	Biniam Girmay	Eritrea	6:26:57	+ 7:23
50	21	Luca Mozzato	Italy	6:26:57	+ 7:23
51	36	Ben O'Connor	Australia	6:26:57	+ 7:23
52	54	Alexey Lutsenko	Kazakhstan	6:26:57	+ 7:23
53	62	Orluis Aular	Venezuela	6:26:57	+ 7:23
54	87	Eduardo Sepúlveda	Argentina	6:28:31	+ 8:57
55	64	Eric Fagúndez	Uruguay	6:28:31	+ 8:57
56	68	Yukiya Arashiro	Japan	6:28:31	+ 8:57
57	69	Sainbayaryn Jambaljamts	Mongolia	6:28:31	+ 8:57
58	82	Jakob Söderqvist	Sweden	6:33:56	+ 14:22
59	17	Michael Mørkøv	Denmark	6:36:31	+ 16:57
60	52	Ryan Mullen	Ireland	6:36:31	+ 16:57
61	57	Stanisław Aniołkowski	Poland	6:38:03	+ 18:29
62	79	Itamar Einhorn	Israel	6:39:27	+ 19:53
63	42	Søren Wærenskjold	Norway	6:39:27	+ 19:53
64	86	Ognjen Ilić	Serbia	6:39:27	+ 19:53
65	83	Kim Eu-ro	South Korea	6:39:27	+ 19:53
66	76	Anatoliy Budyak	Ukraine	6:39:27	+ 19:53
67	77	Franklin Archibold	Panama	6:39:27	+ 19:53
68	73	Lü Xianjing	China	6:39:27	+ 19:53
69	66	Ryan Gibbons	South Africa	6:39:27	+ 19:53
70	43	Nils Politt	Germany	6:39:29	+ 19:55
71	81	Vinícius Rangel	Brazil	6:39:31	+ 19:57
72	2	Daan Hoole	Netherlands	6:41:17	+ 21:43
73	16	Mikkel Norsgaard Bjerg	Denmark	6:41:17	+ 21:43
74	41	Tobias Foss	Norway	6:41:17	+ 21:43
75	78	Georgios Bouglas	Greece	6:45:33	+ 25:59
76	85	Ali Labib	Iran	6:46:33	+ 26:59
77	89	Charles Kagimu	Uganda	6:50:49	+ 31:15
—	10	Matej Mohorič	Slovenia	DNF	
—	11	Domen Novak	Slovenia	DNF	
—	22	Elia Viviani	Italy	DNF	
—	50	Gleb Syritsa	Individual Neutral Athletes	DNF	
—	53	Yevgeniy Fedorov	Kazakhstan	DNF	
—	70	Achraf Ed Doghmy	Morocco	DNF	
—	71	Christopher Lagane	Mauritius	DNF	
—	72	Yacine Hamza	Algeria	DNF	
—	74	Nikita Tsvetkov	Uzbekistan	DNF	
—	80	Thanakhan Chaiyasombat	Thailand	DNF	
—	84	Burak Abay	Turkey	DNF	
—	88	Vincent Lau Wan Yau	Hong Kong	DNF	
—	90	Eric Manizabayo	Rwanda	DNF	
