= 2023 European Road Championships – Men's time trial =

Men's elite time trial
2023 European Road Championships

Race details
- Dates: 20 September 2023
- Stages: 1
- Distance: 29.8 km (18.52 mi)
- Winning time: 31:30.01

Medalists
	Gold	Joshua Tarling (GBR)
	Silver	Stefan Bissegger (SUI)
	Bronze	Wout van Aert (BEL)

The men's elite time trial at the 2023 European Road Championships took place on 20 September 2023, in Drenthe, the Netherlands.

== Results ==
Rank	#	Cyclist	Nation	Time	Diff.
1st place, gold medalist(s)	1	Joshua Tarling	Great Britain	31:30.01	
2nd place, silver medalist(s)	9	Stefan Bissegger	Switzerland	32:12.93	+00:42.92
3rd place, bronze medalist(s)	2	Wout van Aert	Belgium	32:13.15	+00:43.14
4	4	Mikkel Bjerg	Denmark	32:39.65	+01:09.64
5	6	Mattia Cattaneo	Italy	32:43.77	+01:13.76
6	5	Nelson Oliveira	Portugal	32:45.91	+01:15.90
7	10	Daan Hoole	Netherlands	32:52.03	+01:22.02
8	8	Rémi Cavagna	France	32:55.19	+01:25.18
9	21	Yves Lampaert	Belgium	32:55.22	+01:25.21
10	27	Sjoerd Bax	Netherlands	32:59.00	+01:28.99
11	3	Stefan Küng	Switzerland	32:59.69	+01:29.68
12	18	Bruno Armirail	France	33:04.71	+01:34.70
13	20	Michal Kwiatkowski	Poland	33:05.96	+01:35.95
14	26	Niklas Larsen	Denmark	33:13.19	+01:43.18
15	19	Maximilian Walscheid	Germany	33:14.14	+01:44.13
16	7	Maciej Bodnar	Poland	33:17.86	+01:47.85
17	14	Ryan Mullen	Ireland	33:18.52	+01:48.51
18	28	Ivo Oliveira	Portugal	33:20.88	+01:50.87
19	12	Rainer Kepplinger	Austria	33:23.66	+01:53.65
20	13	Matteo Sobrero	Italy	33:44.41	+02:14.40
21	11	Miguel Heidemann	Germany	33:51.88	+02:21.87
22	22	Xabier Azparren	Spain	33:54.12	+02:24.11
23	24	Ognjen Ilić	Serbia	33:56.07	+02:26.06
24	16	Mathias Vacek	Czech Republic	33:56.32	+02:26.31
25	17	Rein Taaramäe	Estonia	34:10.14	+02:40.13
26	32	Vladyslav Makogon	Finland	35:06.78	+03:36.77
27	29	Yan Pastushenko	Ukraine	36:10.12	+04:40.11
28	23	Ingvar Ómarsson	Iceland	36:31.36	+05:01.35
29	25	Daniel Bonello	Malta	36:58.21	+05:28.20
30	30	Ahmet Örken	Turkey	37:02.39	+05:32.38
31	15	Blerton Nuha	Kosovo	40:54.57	+09:24.56
32	31	Samir Hasani	Kosovo	41:06.18	+09:36.17
