= UCI Road World Championships – Men's time trial =

World championship individual time trial race

- Rainbow jersey

Race details
- Date: September–October
- Discipline: Time trial
- Type: One-day
- Organiser: Union Cycliste Internationale (UCI)

History
- First edition: 1994
- Editions: 33 (as of 2026)
- First winner: Chris Boardman (GBR)
- Most wins: Fabian Cancellara (SUI); Tony Martin (GER); Remco Evenepoel (BEL); (4 wins)
- Most recent: Remco Evenepoel (BEL)

The men's individual time trial event at the UCI Road World Championships is the men's world championship for the road bicycle racing discipline of time trial. Introduced in 1994 by the Union Cycliste Internationale (UCI), the world's governing body of cycling, the event consists of a time trial covering a distance of typically covering a distance of 30–50 kilometres (19–31 mi) over flat or rolling terrain. Riders start separated by two-minute intervals; the one that completes the course in the shortest time is the winner, and is entitled to wear the rainbow jersey in time trial events for the forthcoming season.

Switzerland's Fabian Cancellara (2006, 2007, 2009 and 2010), Germany's Tony Martin (2011, 2012, 2013 and 2016) and Belgium's Remco Evenepoel (2023, 2024, 2025 and 2026) have won the most competitions, with four each. Only Evenepoel was able to win in four successive years. Bradley Wiggins is the oldest winner of the event, at 34 years and 149 days old when he won in 2014, while Evenepoel is the youngest winner, at 23 years and 198 days old when he won in 2023.

Germany's Michael Rich has finished second on three occasions, and is the most successful rider not to have won the event, with a total of four medals. Cancellara has the most third-place finishes, with three. German cyclists are the most successful, with seven victories, while Swiss and Australian cyclists are second with five each. The current male champion is Belgian rider Remco Evenepoel, who won the 2026 event.

== History ==
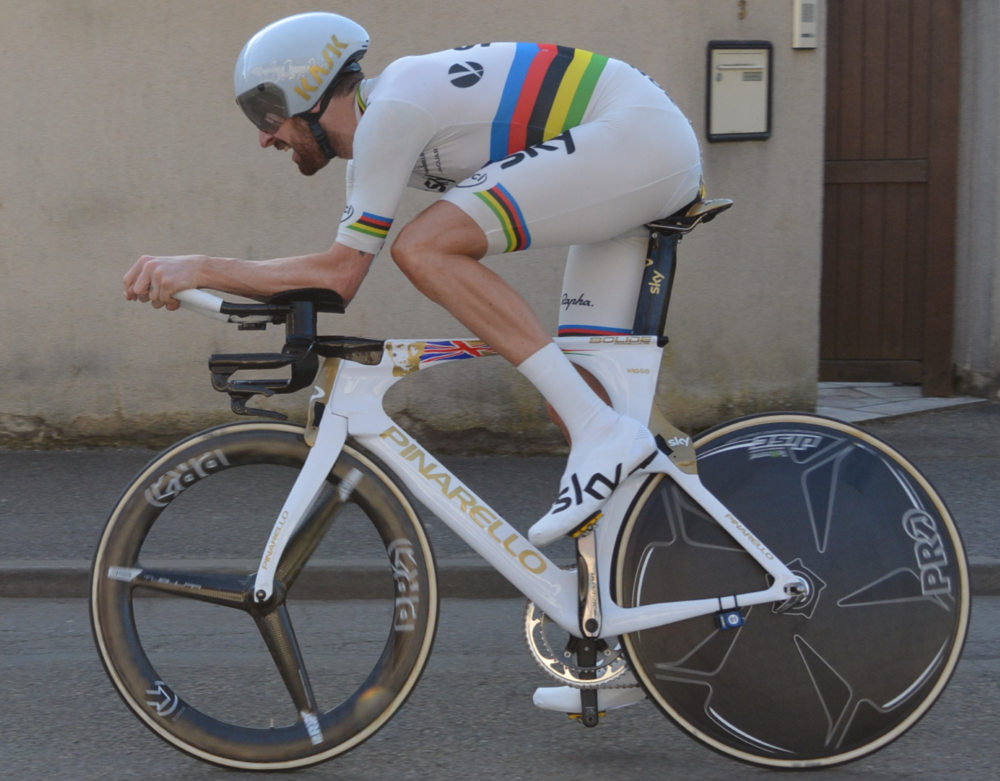
Bradley Wiggins wearing the rainbow jersey he won at the 2014 World Championships.

Before 1994, the cyclists who performed well in the time trials during the three Grand Tours were considered the best in the world. The first event, at the 1994 UCI Road World Championships in Agrigento, Italy, was won by British cyclist Chris Boardman, ahead of Italy's Andrea Chiurato. Tour de France winner Miguel Induráin won the event the following year, beating fellow Spaniard Abraham Olano by forty-nine seconds. Alex Zülle, the 1996 Vuelta a España winner, won the rainbow jersey in his home country, ahead of Boardman and fellow Swiss cyclist Tony Rominger. The following year, Frenchman Laurent Jalabert beat Ukraine's Serhiy Honchar to the world title by three seconds in Valkenburg. Olano won the event in 1998, beating his fellow Spaniard Melcior Mauri by thirty-seven seconds.

Germany's Jan Ullrich won the event in 1999, beating Swedish rider Michael Andersson by fourteen seconds around the 50.8 kilometres (31.6 mi) course in Treviso. Ullrich did not participate in the 2000 world championships in Plouay, and Honchar took the world title in his absence, beating Ullrich's countryman Michael Rich by ten seconds. The Ukrainian was happy to win the event after previous runner-up and third-place finishes: "I'm really satisfied, after the silver and bronze, I've finally got my World Championship." Ullrich returned the following year and reclaimed the rainbow jersey, beating Britain's David Millar by six seconds in Lisbon. Ullrich again decided against defending his title in 2002, leaving Santiago Botero to become the first Colombian to win a World Championship gold medal, as he beat Rich by eight seconds. Millar won the event in 2003; however, he was stripped of the title a year later after being found guilty of doping. Second-placed Michael Rogers was subsequently awarded the victory. He finished ahead of the next competitor, Uwe Peschel, by less than a second.

Rogers retained the title the following two years, finishing a minute and twelve seconds ahead of Rich in 2004, and twenty-three seconds ahead of Spain's Iván Gutiérrez in 2005. Rogers's run came to an end the following year, as Switzerland's Fabian Cancellara secured the victory in Salzburg, one minute and eighteen seconds ahead of American rider David Zabriskie. The Swiss defended his title in 2007, finishing ahead of Hungarian and Dutch cyclists László Bodrogi and Stef Clement. Germany's Bert Grabsch succeeded Cancellara, who was absent from the 2008 event in Varese, winning the title ahead of Canada's Svein Tuft and Zabriskie. Cancellara returned in 2009 and reclaimed the rainbow jersey after beating Sweden's Gustav Larsson and Germany's Tony Martin in Mendrisio. He won the rainbow jersey for a record fourth time the following year, with Millar and Martin finishing second and third, respectively. Cancellara was unsure whether he would compete beforehand, but stated: "It's maybe the hardest of all my wins because leading up to this I wasn't sure of my condition."

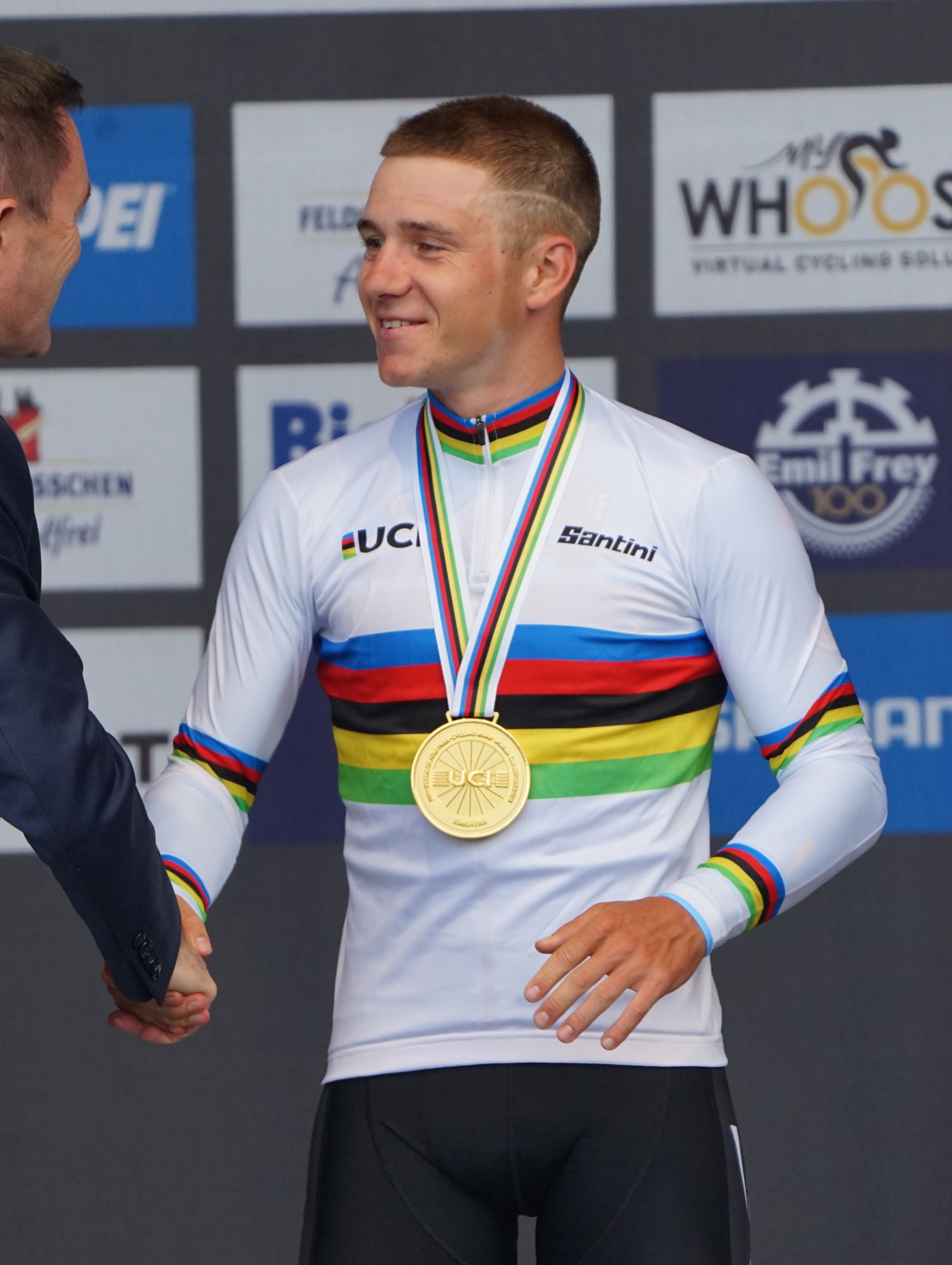
Remco Evenepoel accepting his gold medal at the 2024 World Championships

After two consecutive third-place finishes, Martin was victorious in 2011, beating Bradley Wiggins and defending champion Cancellara by a minute and fifteen seconds. He retained the rainbow jersey the following year; however, the margin of victory was considerably smaller as he beat the American Taylor Phinney by five seconds. In 2013, Martin won the event for a third consecutive time, again overcoming Wiggins and Cancellara. After two runner-up finishes, Wiggins prevented Martin's fourth successive win in the following season, taking the world title for the first time. Wiggins decided not to take part in 2015, focusing instead on breaking the hour record. In his absence, the winner was Belarusian cyclist Vasil Kiryienka, who came in third to Martin in 2012, beating Italy's Adriano Malori and France's Jérôme Coppel.

== Medal winners ==
Key
Year	The year the competition was held
Margin	The difference between the winner's time and those of the riders in second and third place
Distance	The distance over which the race was held

Men's time trial medallists
Year	Gold	Time	Silver	Margin	Bronze	Margin	Distance	Location	Ref.
1994	Chris Boardman (GBR)	49' 34"	Andrea Chiurato (ITA)	+ 0' 48"	Jan Ullrich (GER)	+ 1' 51"	42.0 km (26.1 mi)	Agrigento, Italy	
1995	Miguel Induráin (ESP)	55' 30"	Abraham Olano (ESP)	+ 0' 49"	Uwe Peschel (GER)	+ 2' 03"	43.0 km (26.7 mi)	Duitama, Colombia	
1996	Alex Zülle (SUI)	48' 13"	Chris Boardman (GBR)	+ 0' 39"	Tony Rominger (SUI)	+ 0' 41"	40.4 km (25.1 mi)	Lugano, Switzerland	
1997	Laurent Jalabert (FRA)	52' 01"	Serhiy Honchar (UKR)	+ 0' 03"	Chris Boardman (GBR)	+ 0' 20"	43.8 km (27.2 mi)	San Sebastián, Spain	
1998	Abraham Olano (ESP)	54' 32"	Melcior Mauri (ESP)	+ 0' 37"	Serhiy Honchar (UKR)	+0' 47"	43.5 km (27.0 mi)	Valkenburg, Netherlands	
1999	Jan Ullrich (GER)	1h 00' 28"	Michael Andersson (SWE)	+ 0' 14"	Chris Boardman (GBR)	+ 0' 58"	50.8 km (31.6 mi)	Treviso, Italy	
2000	Serhiy Honchar (UKR)	56' 21"	Michael Rich (GER)	+ 0' 10"	László Bodrogi (HUN)	+ 0' 24"	50.6 km (31.4 mi)	Plouay, France	
2001	Jan Ullrich (GER)	51' 50"	David Millar (GBR)	+ 0' 06"	Santiago Botero (COL)	+ 0' 17"	38.7 km (24.0 mi)	Lisbon, Portugal	
2002	Santiago Botero (COL)	48' 08"	Michael Rich (GER)	+ 0' 08"	Igor González de Galdeano (ESP)	+ 0' 17"	40.4 km (25.1 mi)	Limburg, Belgium	
2003	Michael Rogers (AUS) (Note: David Millar was the winner of the 2003 event in Hamilton, but was subsequently found to have tested positive for performance-enhancing drugs. The Court of Arbitration for Sport found him guilty of using erythropoietin during the time trial and stripped him of his title on 4 August 2004.)	52' 42"	Uwe Peschel (GER)	+ 0" (Note: Rogers finished 0' 00" 56"' ahead of Peschel.)	Michael Rich (GER)	+ 0' 10"	48.3 km (30.0 mi)	Hamilton, Canada	
2004	Michael Rogers (AUS)	57' 30"	Michael Rich (GER)	+ 1' 12"	Alexander Vinokourov (KAZ)	+ 1' 25"	46.7 km (29.0 mi)	Verona, Italy	
2005	Michael Rogers (AUS)	53' 34"	Iván Gutiérrez (ESP)	+ 0' 23"	Fabian Cancellara (SUI)	+ 0' 23"	44.1 km (27.4 mi)	Madrid, Spain	
2006	Fabian Cancellara (SUI)	1h 00' 11"	David Zabriskie (USA)	+ 1' 18"	Alexander Vinokourov (KAZ)	+ 1' 38"	50.8 km (31.6 mi)	Salzburg, Austria	
2007	Fabian Cancellara (SUI)	55' 41"	László Bodrogi (HUN)	+ 0' 52"	Stef Clement (NED)	+ 0' 57"	44.9 km (27.9 mi)	Stuttgart, Germany	
2008	Bert Grabsch (GER)	52' 01"	Svein Tuft (CAN)	+ 0' 42"	David Zabriskie (USA)	+ 0' 52"	43.7 km (27.2 mi)	Varese, Italy	
2009	Fabian Cancellara (SUI)	57' 55"	Gustav Larsson (SWE)	+ 1' 27"	Tony Martin (GER)	+ 2' 30"	49.8 km (30.9 mi)	Mendrisio, Switzerland	
2010	Fabian Cancellara (SUI)	58' 09"	David Millar (GBR)	+ 1' 02"	Tony Martin (GER)	+ 1' 12"	45.6 km (28.3 mi)	Geelong, Australia	
2011	Tony Martin (GER)	53' 43"	Bradley Wiggins (GBR)	+ 1' 15"	Fabian Cancellara (SUI)	+ 1' 20"	46.4 km (28.8 mi)	Copenhagen, Denmark	
2012	Tony Martin (GER)	58' 38"	Taylor Phinney (USA)	+ 0' 05"	Vasil Kiryienka (BLR)	+ 1' 44"	46.2 km (28.7 mi)	Limburg, Netherlands	
2013	Tony Martin (GER)	1h 05' 36"	Bradley Wiggins (GBR)	+ 0' 46"	Fabian Cancellara (SUI)	+ 0' 48"	57.9 km (36.0 mi)	Tuscany, Italy	
2014	Bradley Wiggins (GBR)	56' 25"	Tony Martin (GER)	+ 0' 26"	Tom Dumoulin (NED)	+ 0' 40"	47.1 km (29.3 mi)	Ponferrada, Spain	
2015	Vasil Kiryienka (BLR)	1h 02' 29"	Adriano Malori (ITA)	+ 0' 09"	Jérôme Coppel (FRA)	+ 0' 26"	53.0 km (32.9 mi)	Richmond, Virginia, United States	
2016	Tony Martin (GER)	44' 42"	Vasil Kiryienka (BLR)	+ 0' 45"	Jonathan Castroviejo (ESP)	+ 1' 10"	40.0 km (24.9 mi)	Doha, Qatar	
2017	Tom Dumoulin (NED)	44' 41"	Primož Roglič (SLO)	+ 0' 57"	Chris Froome (GBR)	+ 1' 21"	31.0 km (19.3 mi)	Bergen, Norway	
2018	Rohan Dennis (AUS)	1h 03' 45"	Tom Dumoulin (NED)	+ 1' 21"	Victor Campenaerts (BEL)	+ 1' 22"	52.2 km (32.4 mi)	Innsbruck, Austria	
2019	Rohan Dennis (AUS)	1h 05' 05"	Remco Evenepoel (BEL)	+ 1' 08"	Filippo Ganna (ITA)	+ 1' 55"	54.0 km (33.6 mi)	Yorkshire, United Kingdom	
2020	Filippo Ganna (ITA)	35' 54"	Wout van Aert (BEL)	+ 0' 27"	Stefan Küng (SUI)	+ 0' 30"	31.7 km (19.7 mi)	Imola, Italy	
2021	Filippo Ganna (ITA)	47' 48"	Wout van Aert (BEL)	+ 0' 05"	Remco Evenepoel (BEL)	+ 0' 43"	43.3 km (26.9 mi)	Brugge, Belgium	
2022	Tobias Foss (NOR)	40' 02"	Stefan Küng (SUI)	+ 0' 03"	Remco Evenepoel (BEL)	+ 0' 09"	34.2 km (21.3 mi)	Wollongong, Australia	
2023	Remco Evenepoel (BEL)	55' 19"	Filippo Ganna (ITA)	+ 0' 12"	Joshua Tarling (GBR)	+ 0' 48"	47.8 km (29.7 mi)	Stirling, Scotland, UK	
2024	Remco Evenepoel (BEL)	53' 01"	Filippo Ganna (ITA)	+ 0' 07"	Edoardo Affini (ITA)	+ 0' 55"	46.1 km (28.6 mi)	Zurich, Switzerland	
2025	Remco Evenepoel (BEL)	49' 46"	Jay Vine (AUS)	+ 1' 14"	Ilan Van Wilder (BEL)	+ 2' 36"	40.6 km (25.2 mi)	Kigali, Rwanda	
2026	Remco Evenepoel (BEL)	44' 53"	Filippo Ganna (ITA)	+ 0' 57"	Paul Seixas (FRA)	+ 1' 13"	39.2 km (24.4 mi)	Montreal, Canada	

=== Most successful cyclists ===
The most successful cyclists are listed below and ranked by in order gold, silver and bronze medals won.

Most successful men's time trial cyclists
Rank	Cyclist	Gold	Silver	Bronze	Total
1	Tony Martin (GER)	4	1	2	7
1	Remco Evenepoel (BEL)	4	1	2	7
3	Fabian Cancellara (SUI)	4	0	3	7
4	Michael Rogers (AUS)	3	0	0	3
5	Filippo Ganna (ITA)	2	3	1	6
6	Jan Ullrich (GER)	2	0	1	3
7	Rohan Dennis (AUS)	2	0	0	2
8	Bradley Wiggins (GBR)	1	2	0	3
9	Chris Boardman (GBR)	1	1	2	4
10	Serhiy Honchar (UKR)	1	1	1	3
10	Vasil Kiryienka (BLR)	1	1	1	3
10	Tom Dumoulin (NED)	1	1	1	3

=== Medallists by nation ===
Nations are ranked in order of number of gold, silver and bronze medals won.

Men's time trial medallists by nation
Rank	Country	Gold	Silver	Bronze	Total
1	Germany	7	5	5	17
2	Switzerland	5	1	5	11
3	Australia	5	1	0	6
4	Belgium	4	3	4	11
5	Great Britain	2	5	4	11
6	Italy	2	5	2	9
7	Spain	2	3	2	7
8	Netherlands	1	1	2	4
9	Belarus	1	1	1	3
9	Ukraine	1	1	1	3
11	France	1	0	2	3
13	Colombia	1	0	1	2
12	Norway	1	0	0	1
14	United States	0	2	1	3
15	Sweden	0	2	0	2
16	Hungary	0	1	1	2
17	Canada	0	1	0	1
17	Slovenia	0	1	0	1
19	Kazakhstan	0	0	2	2
