= Mitchelton–Scott =

Mitchelton–Scott may refer to:

- Mitchelton–Scott (men's team), a professional cycling team that competes on the UCI World Tour.
- Mitchelton–Scott (women's team), a professional cycling team that competes on the UCI Women's World Tour.
- Mitchelton–BikeExchange, a Chinese registered continental level development team, on UCI Continental Tours formerly called Mitchelton Scott.
