= 2023 UCI Road World Championships – Men's time trial =

Cycling event

Men's time trial
2023 UCI Road World Championships

Race details
- Dates: 11 August 2023
- Distance: 47.8 km (29.70 mi)
- Winning time: 55' 19.23

Medalists
	Gold	(Belgium) Remco Evenepoel (BEL)
	Silver	(Italy) Filippo Ganna (ITA)
	Bronze	(United Kingdom) Joshua Tarling (GBR)

The Men's time trial of the 2023 UCI Road World Championships was a cycling event that took place on 11 August 2023 in Stirling, Scotland. It was the 30th edition of the championship, for which Tobias Foss of Norway was the defending champion, having won in 2022.

== Participating nations ==
78 cyclists from 49 nations will compete in the event. The number of cyclists per nation is shown in parentheses.

- Afghanistan (2)
- Anguilla (1)
- Argentina (1)
- Australia (2)
- Austria (2)
- Belgium (2)
- British Virgin Islands (1)
- Canada (2)
- Cape Verde (2)
- China (2)
- Colombia (2)
- Cyprus (1)
- Czech Republic (2)
- Denmark (2)
- Eswatini (1)
- France (2)
- Germany (2)
- Ghana (2)
- Great Britain (2)
- Greece (1)
- Guam (2)
- Guinea (1)
- Iceland (1)
- Iran (1)
- Ireland (2)
- Italy (2)
- Kazakhstan (2)
- Latvia (1)
- Malta (2)
- Mauritius (2)
- Mongolia (1)
- Netherlands (2)
- Norway (3)
- New Zealand (1)
- Panama (1)
- Poland (1)
- Portugal (2)
- Qatar (1)
- Saint Lucia (1)
- Serbia (1)
- Slovenia (1)
- South Africa (2)
- Spain (1)
- Switzerland (2)
- Uganda (1)
- Ukraine (1)
- United States (2)
- Uzbekistan (2)
- UCI Refugee Team (2)

=== Continental champions ===
Name	Country	Reason
Tobias Foss	Norway	Incumbent World Champion
Charles Kagimu	Uganda	African Champion
Walter Vargas	Colombia	Panamerican Champion
Yevgeniy Fedorov	Kazakhstan	Asian Champion
Tom Sexton	New Zealand	Oceanian Champion

== Final classification ==
Rank	Rider	Time
1st place, gold medalist(s)	(Belgium) Remco Evenepoel (BEL)	55' 19.23"
2nd place, silver medalist(s)	(Italy) Filippo Ganna (ITA)	+ 12.28"
3rd place, bronze medalist(s)	(United Kingdom) Josh Tarling (GBR)	+ 48.20"
4	(United States) Brandon McNulty (USA)	+ 1' 26.91"
5	(Belgium) Wout van Aert (BEL)	+ 1' 37.23"
6	(Portugal) Nelson Oliveira (POR)	+ 1' 52.46”
7	(Australia) Rohan Dennis (AUS)	+ 1' 53.66”
8	(Italy) Mattia Cattaneo (ITA)	+ 1' 56.78"
9	(Denmark) Mikkel Bjerg (DEN)	+ 1' 58.96"
10	(United Kingdom) Geraint Thomas (GBR)	+ 2' 04.47"
11	(Norway) Tobias Foss (NOR)	+ 2' 04.66"
12	(Switzerland) Stefan Küng (SUI)	+ 2' 17.07"
13	(Norway) Søren Wærenskjold (NOR)	+ 2' 24.80"
14	(Denmark) Kasper Asgreen (DEN)	+ 2' 27.52"
15	(United States) Lawson Craddock (USA)	+ 2' 36.58"
16	(Switzerland) Stefan Bissegger (SUI)	+ 2' 43.28"
17	(Canada) Derek Gee (CAN)	+ 2' 57.94"
18	(Germany) Lennard Kämna (GER)	+ 3' 00.59"
19	(Republic of Ireland) Ryan Mullen (IRL)	+ 3' 02.34"
20	(France) Bruno Armirail (FRA)	+ 3' 03.65"
21	(Slovenia) Tadej Pogačar (SLO)	+ 3' 05.88"
22	(South Africa) Ryan Gibbons (RSA)	+ 3' 07.34"
23	(Portugal) João Almeida (POR)	+ 3' 07.62"
24	(South Africa) Stefan de Bod (RSA)	+ 3' 10.99"
25	(France) Remi Cavagna (FRA)	+ 3' 12.79"
26	(Republic of Ireland) Ben Healy (IRL)	+ 3' 14.10"
27	(Norway) Iver Knotten (NOR)	+ 3' 14.50"
28	(Australia) Jay Vine (AUS)	+ 3' 16.25"
29	(New Zealand) Tom Sexton (NZL)	+ 3' 21.23"
30	(Colombia) Walter Vargas (COL)	+ 3' 33.10"
31	(Poland) Maciej Bodnar (POL)	+ 3' 54.70"
32	(Germany) Nils Politt (GER)	+ 3' 55.51"
33	(Latvia) Toms Skujiņš (LAT)	+ 4' 04.95"
34	(Netherlands) Daan Hoole (NED)	+ 4' 10.39"
35	(Colombia) Harold Tejada (COL)	+ 4' 10.54"
36	(Netherlands) Jos van Emden (NED)	+ 4' 39.63"
37	(Austria) Patrick Gamper (AUT)	+ 4' 41.30"
38	(Czech Republic) Mathias Vacek (CZE)	+ 4' 53.49"
39	(Kazakhstan) Yevgeniy Fedorov (KAZ)	+ 4' 54.12"
40	(Spain) Xabier Azparren (ESP)	+ 5' 07.73"
41	(Serbia) Ognjen Ilić (SRB)	+ 5' 16.81"
42	(Cyprus) Andreas Miltiadis (CYP)	+ 5' 44.43"
43	(Greece) Miltiadis Giannoutsos (GRE)	+ 5' 49.59"
44	(Czech Republic) Jakub Otruba (CZE)	+ 5' 50.64"
45	(Canada) Nickolas Zukowsky (CAN)	+ 6' 50.86"
46	(Argentina) Juan Pablo Dotti (ARG)	+ 7' 06.17"
47	(Uzbekistan) Aleksey Fomovskiy (UZB)	+ 7' 09.66"
48	(Kazakhstan) Igor Chzhan (KAZ)	+ 7' 29.29"
49	(Uganda) Charles Kagimu (UGA)	+ 7' 57.47"
50	(Uzbekistan) Muradjan Khalmuratov (UZB)	+ 9' 05.58"
51	(Austria) Felix Ritzinger (AUT)	+ 9' 07.48"
52	(Iceland) Ingvar Ómarsson (ISL)	+ 9' 09.41"
53	(Mongolia) Jambaljamts Sainbayar (MGL)	+ 9' 10.26"
54	(China) Ming Xue (CHN)	+ 9' 19.52"
55	(Panama) Randish Abdul Lorenzo (PAN)	+ 9' 59.14"
56	Amir Arsalan Ansari (REF)	+ 10' 04.13"
57	(Mauritius) Christopher Rougier-Lagane (MRI)	+ 10' 20.80"
58	(China) Su Haoyu (CHN)	+ 10' 57.89"
59	(Anguilla) Hasani Hennis (AIA)	+ 11' 07.88"
60	Ahmad Badreddin Wais (REF)	+ 12' 07.44"
61	(Malta) Daniel Bonello (MLT)	+ 12' 17.36"
62	(Malta) Aidan Buttigieg (MLT)	+ 12' 17.85"
63	(Ukraine) Vitalii Novakovskyi (UKR)	+ 12' 41.01"
64	(Qatar) Fadhel Al Khater (QAT)	+ 16' 07.11"
65	(British Virgin Islands) Darel Christopher (IVB)	+ 17' 15.30"
66	(Iran) Mohammad Ganjkhanlou (IRI)	+ 17' 42.92"
67	(Saint Lucia) Kluivert Mitchel (LCA)	+ 19' 05.82"
68	(Guam) Edward Oingerang (GUM)	+ 20' 12.09"
69	(Guam) Jacob Jones (GUM)	+ 20' 17.60"
70	(Afghanistan) Qais Haidari (AFG)	+ 20' 56.07"
71	(Ghana) Christopher Symonds (GHA)	+ 23' 33.01"
72	(Afghanistan) Ahmad Mirzaee (AFG)	+ 23' 42.54"
73	(Guinea) Bangoura Abdoulaye (GUI)	+ 24' 20.58"
74	(Eswatini) Muzi Shabangu (SWZ)	+ 25' 40.99"
75	(Cape Verde) Wiliam Gomes (CPV)	+ 26' 59.65"
76	(Cape Verde) Renato Soares (CPV)	+ 29' 31.59"
77	(Ghana) Henry Tetteh Djangmah (GHA)	+ 30' 03.13"
	(Mauritius) Alexandre Mayer (MRI)	DNF
