= Cycling at the 2024 Summer Olympics – Men's road time trial =

Men's road time trial at the Games of the XXXIII Olympiad
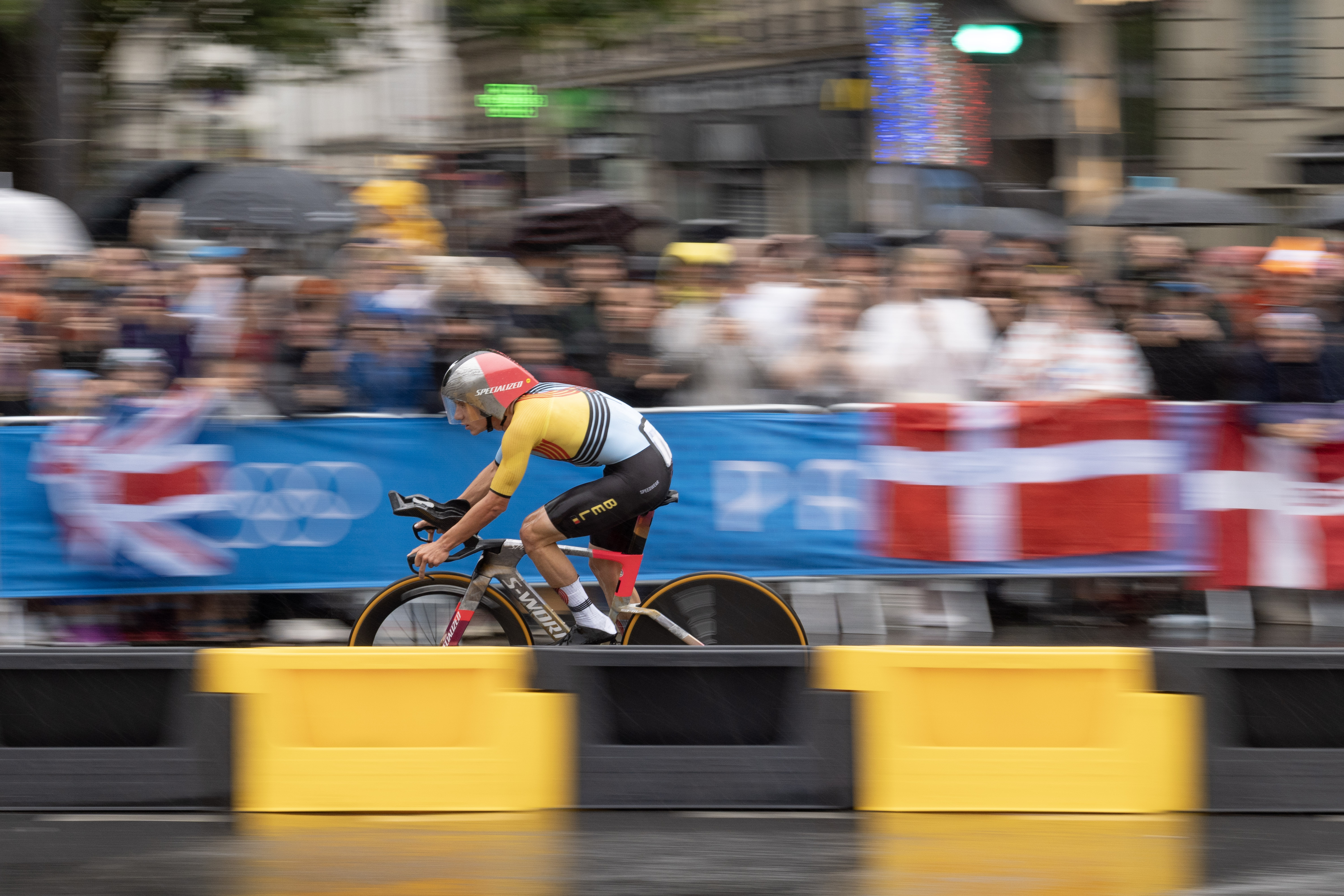
- Gold medallist Remco Evenepoel during the race
- Venues: Pont d'Iéna
- Date: 27 July 2024
- Competitors: 34 from 27 nations
- Winning time: 36:12.16

Medalists
1st place, gold medalist(s)		Remco Evenepoel	Belgium
2nd place, silver medalist(s)		Filippo Ganna	Italy
3rd place, bronze medalist(s)		Wout van Aert	Belgium

The men's road time trial event at the 2024 Summer Olympics took place on 27 July 2024 on a course starting at 16:32 at Pont d'Iéna in Paris.

Remco Evenepoel won the race, to gain his first Olympic medal. Filippo Ganna won silver, and Wout van Aert bronze. Ganna is the 2020 Olympic champion in team pursuit, but this was his first medal in road cycling. Van Aert was the silver medalist at the 2020 road race.

== Background ==
This was the 13th appearance of the event, initially held from 1912 to 1932 and then at every Summer Olympics since 1996.

== Competition format and course ==
The road time trial was a one-day road race event.

== Results ==
Rank	Bib No.	Rider	Nation	Time	Diff.
1st place, gold medalist(s)	1	Remco Evenepoel	Belgium	36:12.16	
2nd place, silver medalist(s)	2	Filippo Ganna	Italy	36:27.08	+0:14.92
3rd place, bronze medalist(s)	11	Wout van Aert	Belgium	36:37.79	+0:25.63
4	5	Josh Tarling	Great Britain	36:39.95	+0:27.79
5	3	Brandon McNulty	United States	37:16.60	+1:04.44
6	14	Stefan Bissegger	Switzerland	37:38.57	+1:26.41
7	6	Nelson Oliveira	Portugal	37:43.15	+1:30.99
8	4	Stefan Küng	Switzerland	37:47.67	+1:35.51
9	12	Maximilian Schachmann	Germany	37:50.71	+1:38.55
10	7	Mikkel Bjerg	Denmark	37:55.32	+1:43.16
11	25	Mathias Vacek	Czech Republic	37:55.62	+1:43.46
12	26	Ryan Mullen	Ireland	37:57.16	+1:45:00
13	8	Tobias Foss	Norway	37:57.28	+1:45:12
14	18	Mattias Skjelmose	Denmark	37:57.69	+1:45:53
15	19	Kevin Vauquelin	France	38:04.93	+1:52.77
16	13	Magnus Sheffield	United States	38:05.24	+1:53.08
17	15	Daan Hoole	Netherlands	38:06.68	+1:54.52
18	31	Alberto Bettiol	Italy	38:06.77	+1:54.61
19	23	Felix Großschartner	Austria	38:17.36	+2:05.20
20	16	Derek Gee	Canada	38:28.17	+2:16.01
21	10	Yevgeniy Fedorov	Kazakhstan	38:33.98	+2:21.82
22	22	Attila Valter	Hungary	38:45.68	+2:33.52
23	24	Michał Kwiatkowski	Poland	38:49.60	+2:37.44
24	30	Laurence Pithie	New Zealand	38:49.76	+2:37.60
25	28	Rui Costa	Portugal	39:00.07	+2:47.91
26	27	Oier Lazkano	Spain	39:08.86	+2:56.70
27	33	Jan Tratnik	Slovenia	39:38.12	+3:25.96
28	21	Jambaljamts Sainbayar	Mongolia	40:19.93	+4:07.77
29	20	Biniam Girmay	Eritrea	40:20.65	+4:08.49
30	34	Amir Ansari	Refugee Olympic Team	40:26.14	+4:13.98
31	32	Gleb Syritsa	Individual Neutral Athletes	40:33.30	+4:21.14
32	29	Achraf Ed Doghmy	Morocco	43:31.37	+7:19.21
	17	Søren Wærenskjold	Norway	DNF	–
	9	Lucas Plapp	Australia	DNF	–
