= 2024 European Road Championships – Men's time trial =

Men's elite time trial
2024 European Road Championships

Race details
- Dates: 11 September 2024
- Stages: 1
- Distance: 31.3 km (19.4 mi)
- Winning time: 35:15.471

Medalists
	Gold	Edoardo Affini (ITA)
	Silver	Stefan Küng (SUI)
	Bronze	Mattia Cattaneo (ITA)

The men's elite time trial at the 2024 European Road Championships took place on 11 September 2024, in Limburg, Belgium.

== Results ==
Rank	#	Cyclist	Nation	Time	Diff.
1st place, gold medalist(s)	25	Edoardo Affini	Italy	35:15.471	
2nd place, silver medalist(s)	4	Stefan Küng	Switzerland	35:25.068	+00:09.59
3rd place, bronze medalist(s)	3	Mattia Cattaneo	Italy	35:35.139	+00:19.66
4	6	Daan Hoole	Netherlands	35:42.329	+00:26.85
5	27	Thymen Arensman	Netherlands	36:09.199	+00:53.72
6	5	Victor Campenaerts	Belgium	36:11.810	+00:56.34
7	24	Nils Politt	Germany	36:16.448	+01:00.97
8	8	Kasper Asgreen	Denmark	36:22.407	+01:06.93
9	7	Søren Wærenskjold	Norway	36:25.329	+01:09.85
10	10	Maximilian Walscheid	Germany	36:28.369	+01:12.89
11	2	Mikkel Bjerg	Denmark	36:30.025	+01:14.55
12	1	Stefan Bissegger	Switzerland	36:45.723	+01:30.25
13	22	Raúl García Pierna	Spain	36:47.083	+01:31.61
14	14	Alex Kirsch	Luxembourg	36:48.207	+01:32.73
15	9	Ivo Oliveira	Portugal	36:51.258	+01:35.78
16	21	Filip Maciejuk	Poland	36:52.322	+01:36.85
17	16	Victor Vercouillie	Belgium	36:52.536	+01:37.06
18	26	Arthur Kluckers	Luxembourg	37:25.283	+02:09.81
19	11	Ognjen Ilić	Serbia	37:25.825	+02:10.35
20	12	Andreas Miltiadis	Cyprus	37:26.755	+02:11.28
21	18	János Pelikán	Hungary	37:34.884	+02:19.41
22	23	Vitaliy Hryniv	Ukraine	37:48.268	+02:32.79
23	17	Taavi Kannimäe	Estonia	38:08.672	+02:53.20
24	29	Emil Stoynev	Bulgaria	38:41.103	+03:25.63
25	20	Rokas Kmieliauskas	Lithuania	39:40.072	+04:24.60
26	19	Kristinn Jonsson	Iceland	39:56.714	+04:41.24
27	15	Burak Abay	Turkey	40:44.164	+05:28.69
28	13	Martin Papnov	Bulgaria	41:21.040	+06:05.57
29	28	Dogukan Arikan	Turkey	41:51.890	+06:36.42
