= 2022 UCI Road World Championships – Men's time trial =

Cycling event

Men's time trial
2022 UCI Road World Championships
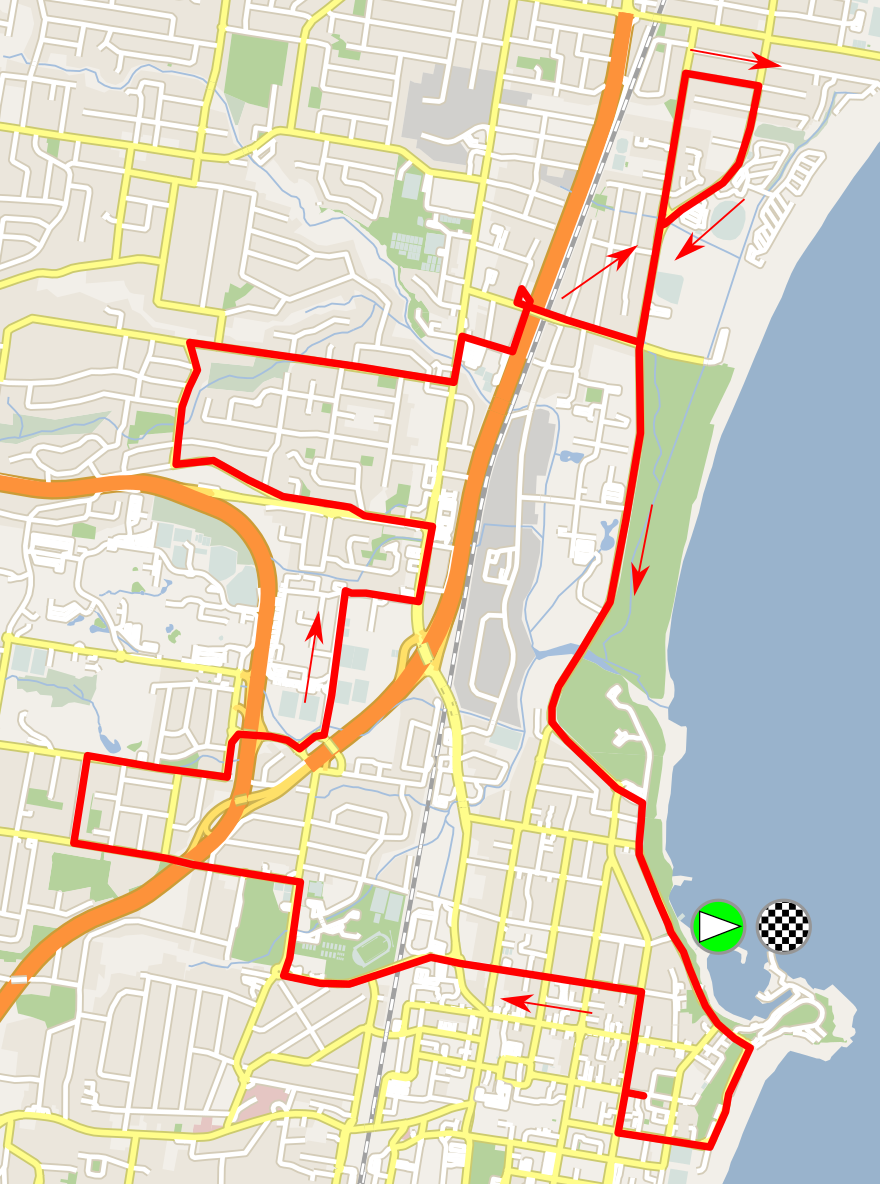

Race details
- Dates: 18 September 2022
- Distance: 34.2 km (21.25 mi)
- Winning time: 40' 02.78"

Medalists
	Gold	Tobias Foss (NOR)
	Silver	Stefan Küng (SUI)
	Bronze	Remco Evenepoel (BEL)

The Men's time trial of the 2022 UCI Road World Championships was a cycling event that took place on 18 September 2022 in Wollongong, Australia. It was the 29th edition of the championship, for which Filippo Ganna of Italy was the defending champion, having won in 2021.

== Participating nations ==
50 cyclists from 31 nations competed in the event. The number of cyclists per nation is shown in parentheses.

- Australia (2)
- Bangladesh (1)
- Belgium (2)
- British Virgin Islands (1)
- Canada (2)
- China (1)
- Colombia (1)
- Denmark (2)
- France (2)
- Germany (2)
- Great Britain (1)
- Guam (1)
- Hong Kong (2)
- Indonesia (2)
- Italy (3)
- Kazakhstan (3)
- Lithuania (1)
- Malta (2)
- Netherlands (2)
- Norway (2)
- Panama (2)
- Poland (1)
- Portugal (2)
- Serbia (1)
- Slovenia (2)
- South Africa (1)
- Spain (1)
- Switzerland (2)
- Ukraine (2)
- United States (2)

== Final classification ==
Rank	Rider	Time
1st place, gold medalist(s)	(Norway) Tobias Foss (NOR)	40' 02.78"
2nd place, silver medalist(s)	(Switzerland) Stefan Küng (SUI)	+ 2.95"
3rd place, bronze medalist(s)	(Belgium) Remco Evenepoel (BEL)	+ 9.16"
4	(United Kingdom) Ethan Hayter (GBR)	+ 39.95"
5	(Switzerland) Stefan Bissegger (SUI)	+ 46.81"
6	(Slovenia) Tadej Pogačar (SLO)	+ 48.13”
7	(Italy) Filippo Ganna (ITA)	+ 55.32”
8	(Portugal) Nelson Oliveira (POR)	+ 58.98"
9	(Belgium) Yves Lampaert (BEL)	+ 1' 08.84"
10	(France) Bruno Armirail (FRA)	+ 1' 09.24"
11	(France) Rémi Cavagna (FRA)	+ 1' 14.30"
12	(Australia) Lucas Plapp (AUS)	+ 1' 24.05"
13	(Italy) Edoardo Affini (ITA)	+ 1' 27.82"
14	(Denmark) Mikkel Bjerg (DEN)	+ 1' 30.15"
15	(Italy) Matteo Sobrero (ITA)	+ 1' 33.73"
16	(Germany) Nikias Arndt (GER)	+ 1' 42.50"
17	(United States) Magnus Sheffield (USA)	+ 1' 44.21"
18	(Poland) Maciej Bodnar (POL)	+ 1' 48.93"
19	(Canada) Derek Gee (CAN)	+ 1' 59.00"
20	(Germany) Miguel Heidemann (GER)	+ 2' 01.04"
21	(Denmark) Magnus Cort Nielsen (DEN)	+ 2' 06.82"
22	(United States) Neilson Powless (USA)	+ 2' 08.60"
23	(Netherlands) Daan Hoole (NED)	+ 2' 14.60"
24	(Norway) Andreas Leknessund (NOR)	+ 2' 17.23"
25	(Netherlands) Bauke Mollema (NED)	+ 2' 17.66"
26	(Canada) Matteo Dal-Cin (CAN)	+ 2' 21.36"
27	(Kazakhstan) Alexey Lutsenko (KAZ)	+ 2' 22.69"
28	(Kazakhstan) Yevgeniy Fedorov (KAZ)	+ 3' 05.21"
29	(Spain) Oier Lazkano (ESP)	+ 3' 08.80"
30	(Serbia) Ognjen Ilić (SRB)	+ 3' 15.61"
31	(Colombia) Rodrigo Contreras (COL)	+ 3' 22.01"
32	(Kazakhstan) Yuriy Natarov (KAZ)	+ 3' 52.86"
33	(Lithuania) Venantas Lašinis (LTU)	+ 4' 34.18"
34	(Malta) Daniel Bonello (MLT)	+ 4' 54.36"
35	(Panama) Christofer Jurado (PAN)	+ 5' 33.73"
36	(Panama) Bolivar Espinosa (PAN)	+ 5' 51.64"
37	(Ukraine) Vitalii Novakovskyi (UKR)	+ 5' 56.10"
38	(Hong Kong) Wan Yau Vincent Lau (HKG)	+ 6' 05.56"
39	(Mongolia) Bilguunjargal Erdenebat (MGL)	+ 6' 40.70"
40	(Indonesia) Aiman Cahyadi (INA)	+ 6' 41.56"
41	(Indonesia) Muhammad Abbdurohman (INA)	+ 6' 52.31"
42	(Malta) Alexander Smyth (MLT)	+ 7' 11.86"
43	(Ukraine) Mykhaylo Kononenko (UKR)	+ 7' 26.24"
44	(Hong Kong) Ng Sum Lui (HKG)	+ 7' 35.54"
45	(British Virgin Islands) Darel Christopher (IVB)	+ 9' 06.69"
46	(China) Changquan Xu (CHN)	+ 9' 36.34"
47	(Guam) Edward Oingerang (GUM)	+ 11' 42.61"
48	(Bangladesh) Drabir Alam (BAN)	+ 19' 10.24"
	(South Africa) Gustav Basson (RSA)	DNS
	(Portugal) João Almeida (POR)	DNS
