= Amir Ansari (cyclist) =

Afghan cyclist

Amir Ansari امیر انصاری
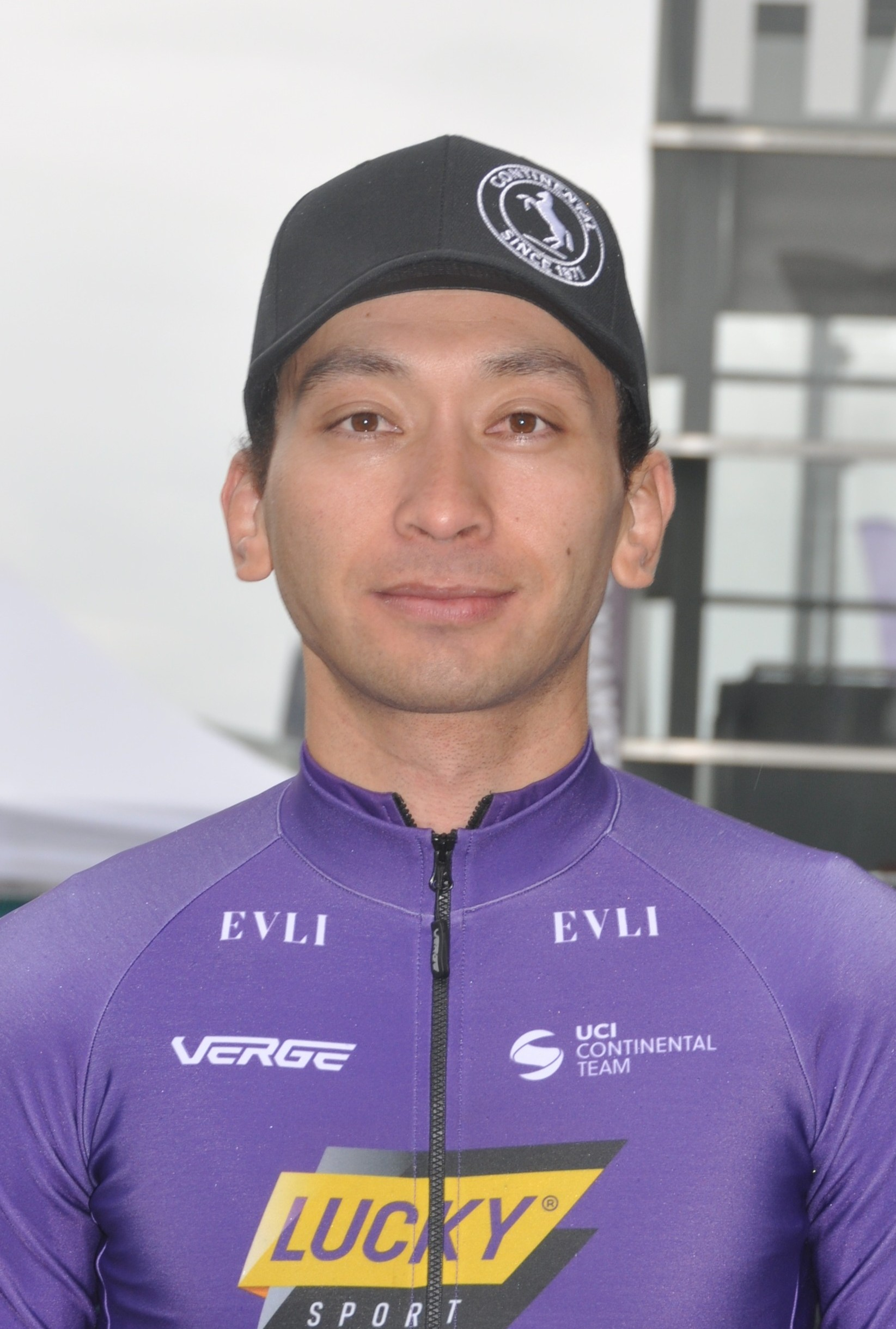
- Ansari at the 2026 Rund um Köln

Personal information
- Full name: Amir Arslan Ansari
- Born: 16 August 1999 (age 27) Iran

Cycling career
- Sport: Cycling
- Current team: Stockholm CK
- Discipline: Road
- Role: Rider

Amateur team
- 2017–: Stockholm CK

Amir Arslan Ansari (Persian: امیر‌ارسلان انصاری; born 16 August 1999) is a road cyclist, who was born in Iran and grew up in Afghanistan. He was selected for the 2024 Olympic Games as part of the International Olympic Committee's Refugee Olympic Team.

== Early life ==
Born in Iran, he grew up in Afghanistan but fled as a teenager in 2015 and lived as a refugee in Sweden. He had a background in mountain biking in Afghanistan, and in Sweden joined Stockholm Cycling Club. The Swedish Olympic Committee has supported him through the IOC's Olympic Solidarity programme.

== Career ==
He has competed as part of the Stockholm CK team and UCI Refugee Team. He competed in the Men's time trial at the 2023 UCI Road World Championships in Glasgow. He also competed in the Mixed team relay in Glasgow for the World Cycling Centre.

In August 2023, the Olympic Refuge Foundation (ORF) announced him as one of ten new refugee athletes awarded scholarships to help them train towards the Olympic Games Paris 2024. In May 2024, he was named as part of the Refugee Olympic Team for the 2024 Paris Olympics.
