= Edoardo Affini =

Italian cyclist (born 1996)

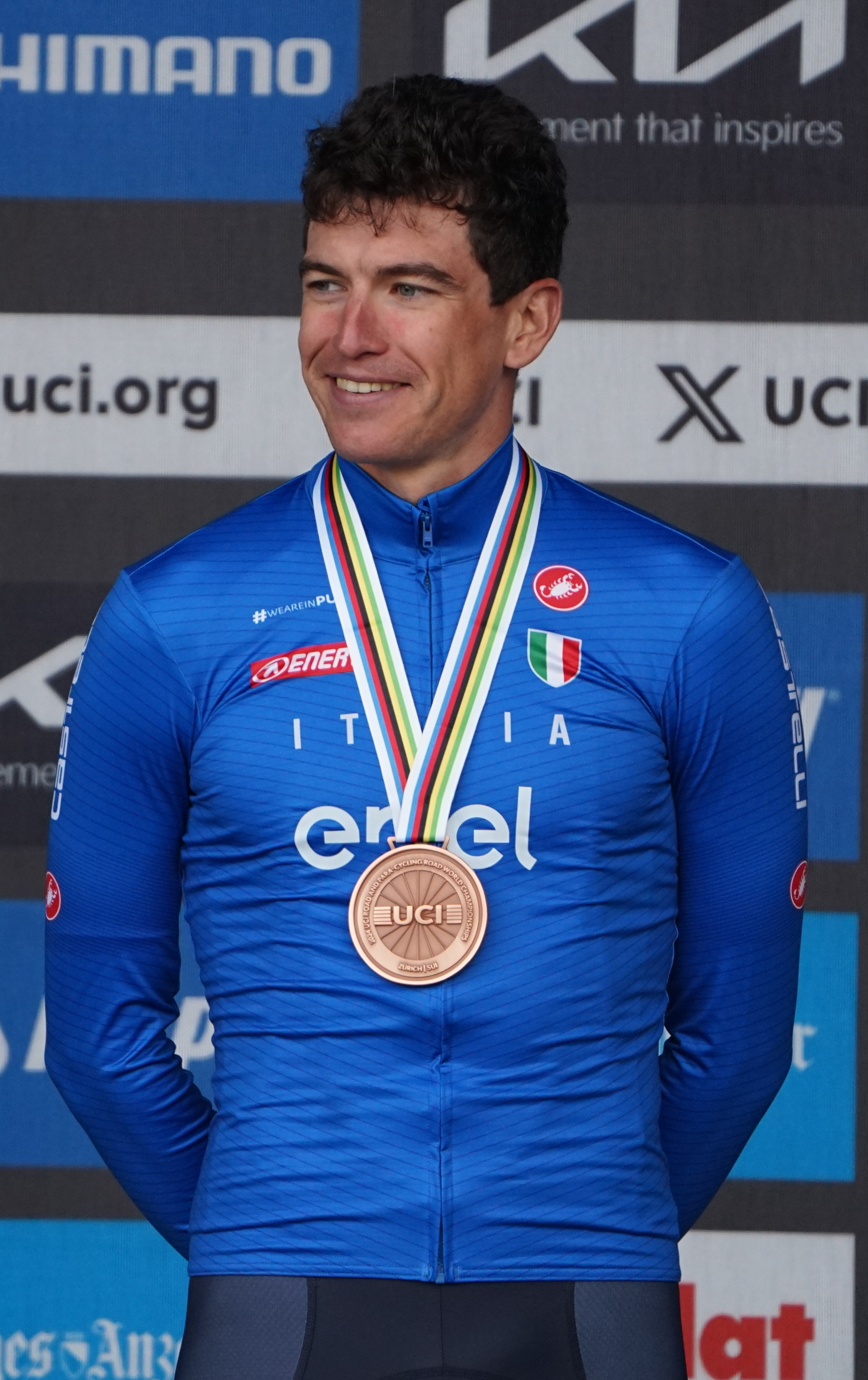
- Affini at the 2024 UCI Road World Championships

Personal information
- Full name: Edoardo Affini
- Born: 24 June 1996 (age 30) Mantua, Italy
- Height: 1.90 m (6 ft 3 in)
- Weight: 80 kg (176 lb)

Cycling career
- Sport: Cycling
- Current team: Visma–Lease a Bike
- Discipline: Road
- Role: Rider
- Rider type: Time trialist

Amateur teams
- 2011: Isolano Sartori
- 2012: Scaliger Pedal
- 2013–2014: GCD Contri Autozai
- 2015: Team Colpack
- 2016: Selle Italia–Cieffe–Ursus
- 2017–2018: SEG Racing Academy

Professional teams
- 2019–2020: Mitchelton–Scott
- 2021–: Team Jumbo–Visma

Major wins
- Grand Tours Tour de France 1 TTT stage (2026) Vuelta a España 1 TTT stage (2022) One-day races and Classics European Time Trial Championships (2024)
Medal record
Men's road bicycle racing
Representing Italy
World Championships
Silver medal – second place	2022 Wollongong	Mixed team relay
Bronze medal – third place	2021 Flanders	Mixed team relay
Bronze medal – third place	2024 Zurich	Time trial
Bronze medal – third place	2024 Zurich	Mixed team relay
European Championships
Gold medal – first place	2024 Limburg	Time trial
Gold medal – first place	2024 Limburg	Mixed team relay
Gold medal – first place	2014 Nyon	Junior road race
Gold medal – first place	2018 Brno	Under-23 time trial
Silver medal – second place	2023 Drenthe	Mixed team relay
Bronze medal – third place	2019 Alkmaar	Time trial
Bronze medal – third place	2019 Alkmaar	Mixed team relay
Mediterranean Games
Gold medal – first place	2018 Tarragona	Time trial

Edoardo Affini (born 24 June 1996) is an Italian professional road cyclist who rides for UCI WorldTeam Visma–Lease a Bike. A specialist in time trials and a versatile rouleur, he has represented Italy at multiple European and World Championships, winning titles in both individual and mixed relay events. Affini won the 2024 European time trial championships, having previously won the under-23 title in 2018, and has also earned multiple medals in the mixed team relay at world level.

Affini turned professional with Mitchelton–Scott in 2019 following a successful under-23 career with SEG Racing Academy, during which he won stages at the Tour of Norway and Tour of Britain, as well as the Mediterranean Games time trial. In 2021, he joined Team Jumbo–Visma (now Visma–Lease a Bike), establishing himself as a key domestique and team time trialist. He has ridden multiple editions of the Giro d'Italia, contributed to team time trial victories at Grand Tours, and in 2025 was selected for his debut in the Tour de France.

== Early life and amateur career ==
=== Youth years ===
Affini was born in Mantua, Italy, and began cycling competitively at a young age. In 2011 and 2012, he finished third in the Italian Junior time trial championship, riding for Isolano Sartori and later Pedale Scaligero. From 2013 to 2014, he competed with GCD Contri Autozai. He won the 2014 European Road Championships, placed second in the national junior time trial, and fourth in the junior world road race. He also claimed victories in the Trofeo San Rocco and Trofeo Buffoni.

In 2015, Affini joined Team Colpack, one of the leading Italian amateur teams. That year, he placed third in the Italian National Time Trial Championships for under-23s and fifth in the European Road Cycling Championships for that category.

=== Under-23 and continental level ===
In 2017, Affini turned professional with the UCI Continental team SEG Racing Academy. He showed promise in time trials, finishing fourth in the European Under-23 time trial and eighth in the world championship for the same discipline.

The 2018 season marked a breakthrough in his development. He won the prologue of the Giro Ciclistico d'Italia (Baby Giro), the time trial at the Mediterranean Games, and the European Under-23 time trial title. He also claimed the Italian Under-23 road race championship. These results earned him a contract with the UCI WorldTeam Mitchelton–Scott beginning in 2019.

== Professional career ==
=== 2019–2020: Mitchelton–Scott ===
Affini made his WorldTour debut in 2019, racing in early season events such as the Clásica de Almería and the Vuelta a Andalucía. Though he struggled in the spring classics—including Milan–San Remo, the Tour of Flanders, and Paris–Roubaix—he gained valuable experience at the elite level. In May, he won a stage at the Tour of Norway, outsprinting breakaway companions on stage four.

Later that season, he represented Italy at the European Championships, earning bronze medals in both the mixed team relay and the individual time trial. He also competed at the 2019 Tour of Britain, winning stage six.

In 2020, Affini started his first Giro d'Italia but was forced to abandon after stage seven due to a fractured hand. He secured third place at the Italian national time trial championships and placed fifth at the European Championships in Plouay. He once again contributed to Italy's bronze medal in the mixed team relay at the continental championships.

=== 2021–present: Jumbo-Visma ===
In 2021, Affini transferred to Jumbo-Visma (now Visma–Lease a Bike). He participated in the 2021 and 2022 editions of the Giro d'Italia and was selected for the 2021 UCI Road World Championships in Flanders, where he won a bronze medal in the mixed team relay alongside Marta Cavalli, Elena Cecchini, Elisa Longo Borghini, Filippo Ganna, and Matteo Sobrero.

At the 2022 Vuelta a España, Affini was part of the team that won the opening team time trial. As a result, he wore the red leader's jersey after stage three. He relinquished it the following day to team leader Primož Roglič, and eventually withdrew from the race due to illness during the second week. Later that year, he won silver in the mixed team relay at the World Championships in Wollongong.

In 2023, he returned to the Giro d'Italia, finishing 92nd overall. In July, he signed a three-year contract extension with Jumbo-Visma. He won silver in the mixed team relay at the European Championships and competed in his fifth Giro d'Italia the following season without achieving a podium finish.

Affini had a particularly successful 2024. At the European Championships, he won the gold medal in both the individual time trial and the mixed team relay. He followed up with two bronze medals at the UCI Road World Championships in Zürich—again in the individual time trial and the mixed team relay—cementing his status as one of Italy's most consistent time trial performers.

In July 2025, Affini was named in Team Visma–Lease a Bike's squad for the 2025 Tour de France, marking his debut in the race. He was selected to support team leader Jonas Vingegaard in his general classification campaign, with a role focused on pacing on flat terrain and contributing in time trials.

== Personal life ==
Affini is in a relationship with Lisa van Zonneveld, a Dutch national from the province of Drenthe. Since late 2024, the couple have resided in the village of Donderen in the municipality of Tynaarlo, in the northeastern Netherlands.

Living in the Netherlands full-time, Affini has become fluent in Dutch and occasionally gives interviews in the language. In interviews, he has described enjoying the quiet, rural environment of Drenthe, contrasting it with the high-pressure atmosphere of professional cycling.

== Major results ==
2013
4th Time trial, National Junior Road Championships
2014
1st Road race, UEC European Junior Road Championships
1st Trofeo San Rocco
1st Trofeo Buffoni
2nd Time trial, National Junior Road Championships
4th Road race, UCI Junior Road World Championships
4th Gran Premio Sportivi di Sovilla
7th Overall Trophée Centre Morbihan
9th Trofeo Dorigo Porte
2015
3rd Time trial, National Under-23 Road Championships
5th Time trial, UEC European Under-23 Road Championships
2016
10th GP Capodarco
2017
4th Time trial, UEC European Under-23 Road Championships
6th Overall Olympia's Tour
8th Time trial, UCI Road World Under-23 Championships
2018
1st Time trial, UEC European Under-23 Road Championships
1st Time trial, Mediterranean Games
National Under-23 Road Championships

1st Road race
1st Time trial

1st Prologue Giro Ciclistico d'Italia
4th Time trial, UCI Road World Under-23 Championships
4th Overall Olympia's Tour
2019 (2 pro wins)
1st Stage 6 (ITT) Tour of Britain
UEC European Road Championships

3rd Time trial
3rd Team relay

4th Time trial, National Road Championships
4th Overall Tour of Norway

1st Stage 4

2020
1st Stage 1 (TTT) Czech Cycling Tour
UEC European Road Championships

3rd Team relay
5th Time trial

2021
2nd Time trial, National Road Championships
UCI Road World Championships

3rd Team relay
9th Time trial

6th Time trial, UEC European Road Championships
2022
Vuelta a España

1st Stage 1 (TTT)
Held after Stage 3

2nd Team relay, UCI Road World Championships
3rd Time trial, National Road Championships
Combativity award Stage 18 Giro d'Italia
2023
1st Stage 3 (TTT) Paris–Nice
1st Stage 2 (TTT) Vuelta a Burgos
2nd Team relay, UEC European Road Championships
8th Münsterland Giro
10th Visit Friesland Elfsteden Race
2024 (1)
1st Time trial, UEC European Road Championships
2nd Time trial, National Road Championships
UCI Road World Championships

3rd Time trial
3rd Team relay

Combativity award Stage 11 Giro d'Italia
2025
1st Stage 3 (TTT) Paris–Nice
2026
1st Stage 1 (TTT) Tour de France
1st Stage 3 (TTT) Tour Auvergne-Rhône-Alpes

=== Grand Tour general classification results timeline ===
Grand Tour	2020	2021	2022	2023	2024	2025	2026
Giro d'Italia	DNF	113	97	94	130	133	—
Tour de France	—	—	—	—	—	118	DNF
Vuelta a España	—	—	DNF	—	119	—	—

Legend
—	Did not compete
DNF	Did not finish
