= 2026 UCI Road World Championships – Men's time trial =

Cycling event

Men's time trial
2026 UCI Road World Championships

Race details
- Dates: 20 September 2026
- Distance: 39.2 km (24.4 mi)
- Winning time: 44:53.13

Medalists
	Gold	(Belgium) Remco Evenepoel (BEL)
	Silver	(Italy) Filippo Ganna (ITA)
	Bronze	(France) Paul Seixas (FRA)

The Men's time trial of the 2026 UCI Road World Championships was a cycling event that took place on 20 September 2026 in Montreal, Canada. It was the 33nd edition of the championship, for which Remco Evenepoel of Belgium was the defending champion, having won in 2025.

The race was won by Belgian rider Remco Evenepoel for the fourth year in a row, beating Italian rider Filippo Ganna by 57 seconds, with French rider Paul Seixas a further 16 seconds slower.

== Course ==
For the first time since 2022, the time trial course for elite men and women was identical in length – a 39.2-kilometre (24.4-mile) route through Montreal, racing along the Saint Lawrence River, crossing the St. Lawrence River, passing through the Circuit Gilles Villeneuve, and returning via the Concorde Bridge.

== Final classification ==
Rank	Athlete	Nation	Time	Time Gap
1st place, gold medalist(s)	Remco Evenepoel	Belgium	44:53.13	–
2nd place, silver medalist(s)	Filippo Ganna	Italy	45:50.44	+ 57.31
3rd place, bronze medalist(s)	Paul Seixas	France	46:06.17	+ 1:13.04
4	Brandon McNulty	United States	46:18.40	+ 1:25.27
5	Jakob Söderqvist	Sweden	46:19.31	+ 1:26.18
6	Isaac del Toro	Mexico	46:31.96	+ 1:38.83
7	Stefan Küng	Switzerland	46:37.57	+ 1:44.44
8	Kasper Asgreen	Denmark	46:41.67	+ 1:48.54
9	Daan Hoole	Netherlands	46:55.34	+ 2:02.21
10	Callum Thornley	Great Britain	46:55.92	+ 2:02.79
11	Alec Segaert	Belgium	46:56.90	+ 2:03.77
12	Mikkel Bjerg	Denmark	46:59.23	+ 2:06.10
13	Michael Leonard	Canada	47:02.78	+ 2:09.65
14	Jasha Sutterlin	Germany	47:04.01	+ 2:10.88
15	Iván Romeo	Spain	47:06.26	+ 2:13.13
16	Mattia Cattaneo	Italy	47:07.52	+ 2:14.39
17	Jan Tratnik	Slovenia	47:09.00	+ 2:15.87
18	Ethan Hayter	Great Britain	47:11.92	+ 2:18.79
19	Artem Shmidt	United States	47:13.57	+ 2:20.44
20	Nelson Oliveira	Portugal	47:16.37	+ 2:23.24
21	Ivo Oliveira	Portugal	47:21.74	+ 2:28.61
22	Tobias Foss	Norway	47:22.31	+ 2:29.18
23	Michał Kwiatkowski	Poland	47:26.91	+ 2:33.78
24	Pablo Castrillo	Spain	47:34.74	+ 2:41.61
25	Byron Munton	South Africa	47:37.44	+ 2:44.31
26	Bruno Armirail	France	47:38.27	+ 2:45.14
27	Max Walscheid	Germany	47:40.65	+ 2:47.52
28	Stefan Bissegger	Switzerland	47:47.40	+ 2:54.27
29	Mathias Vacek	Czech Republic	47:53.11	+ 2:59.98
30	Arthur Kluckers	Luxembourg	48:04.65	+ 3:11.52
31	Nickolas Zukowsky	Canada	48:12.29	+ 3:19.16
32	Andreas Leknessund	Norway	48:15.75	+ 3:22.62
33	Conor Leahy	Australia	48:16.67	+ 3:23.54
34	Rune Herregodts	Belgium	48:21.81	+ 3:28.68
35	Ognjen Ilić	Serbia	48:33.65	+ 3:40.52
36	Ryan Mullen	Ireland	48:41.40	+ 3:48.27
37	Walter Vargas	Colombia	48:41.74	+ 3:48.61
38	János Pelikán	Hungary	49:15.57	+ 4:22.44
39	Henrique Avancini	Brazil	49:22.18	+ 4:29.05
40	Kaden Hopkins	Bermuda	49:40.64	+ 4:47.51
41	Barnabás Peák	Hungary	50:10.90	+ 5:17.77
42	Anton Kuzmin	Kazakhstan	50:24.20	+ 5:31.07
43	Jo Hashikawa	Japan	50:38.94	+ 5:45.81
44	Amir Ansari	ART	50:41.90	+ 5:48.77
45	Brandon Rivera	Colombia	50:46.65	+ 5:53.52
46	Nicholas Narraway	Bermuda	51:10.21	+ 6:17.08
47	Cory Lewis	Belize	51:19.11	+ 6:25.98
48	Batmönkhiin Maral-Erdene	Mongolia	52:00.60	+ 7:07.47
49	Alexandre Mayer	Mauritius	52:04.28	+ 7:11.15
50	Cao Houwang	China	52:20.14	+ 7:27.01
51	Liu Chenglu	China	52:25.10	+ 7:31.97
52	Daniil Marukhin	Kazakhstan	52:26.73	+ 7:33.60
53	Derrick Chavarria	Belize	53:07.49	+ 8:14.36
54	Fredd Matute	Honduras	53:33.09	+ 8:39.96
55	Majid Abu Harrah	Jordan	53:50.94	+ 8:57.81
56	Ahmad Badreddin Wais	ART	54:19.86	+ 9:26.73
57	Daniel Yon Hin	Mauritius	55:13.28	+ 10:20.15
58	Chris Bodden	Cayman Islands	59:24.86	+ 14:31.73
59	Apolinário Cá	Guinea-Bissau	1:08:07.08	+ 23:13.95
60	Gil Gomes	Guinea-Bissau	1:09:27.51	+ 24:34.38
	Arvin Moazzami	Iran	Did not start	
