= 2019 Tour of Belgium =

2019 UCI Europe Tour

Race details
- Dates: 12–16 June
- Stages: 5
- Distance: 682.4 km (424.0 mi)
- Winning time: 15h 49' 17"

Results
| Jersey awarded to the overall winner | Winner | Remco Evenepoel (BEL) | (Deceuninck–Quick-Step) |
| | Second | Victor Campenaerts (BEL) | (Lotto–Soudal) |
| | Third | Tim Wellens (BEL) | (Lotto–Soudal) |
| Jersey awarded to the points classification winner | Points | Remco Evenepoel (BEL) | (Deceuninck–Quick-Step) |
| Jersey awarded to the combativity classification winner | Combativity | Thomas Sprengers (BEL) | (Sport Vlaanderen–Baloise) |

The 2019 Tour of Belgium, known as the 2019 Baloise Belgium Tour for sponsorship purposes, was the 89th edition of the Tour of Belgium cycling stage race. It took place from 12 to 16 June 2019 in Belgium, as part of the 2019 UCI Europe Tour; it was categorised as a 2.HC race.

== Teams ==
22 teams were selected to take part in Tour of Belgium. Four of these were UCI WorldTeams, with twelve UCI Professional Continental teams, five UCI Continental teams and a team representing the Belgium national team.

UCI WorldTeams

- Astana
- Deceuninck–Quick-Step
- Lotto–Soudal
- Trek–Segafredo

UCI Professional Continental teams

- Arkéa–Samsic
- Burgos BH
- Corendon–Circus
- Cofidis
- Israel Cycling Academy
- Riwal Readynez
- Roompot–Charles
- Sport Vlaanderen–Baloise
- Vital Concept–B&B Hotels
- Wanty–Gobert
- Wallonie Bruxelles
- Total Direct Énergie

UCI Continental teams

- Cibel–Cebon
- Natura4Ever–Roubaix–Lille Métropole
- Pauwels Sauzen–Vastgoedservice
- Tarteletto–Isorex
- Telenet–Fidea Lions

National teams

- Belgium

== Route ==
| Stage | Date | Course | Distance | Type | Winner |
|---|---|---|---|---|---|
| 1 | 12 June | Sint-Niklaas to Knokke-Heist | 183.4 km (114.0 mi) | Flat stage | Jan-Willem van Schip (NED) |
| 2 | 13 June | Knokke-Heist to Zottegem | 179.9 km (111.8 mi) | Hilly stage | Remco Evenepoel (BEL) |
| 3 | 14 June | Grimbergen to Grimbergen | 9.2 km (5.7 mi) | Individual time trial | Tim Wellens (BEL) |
| 4 | 15 June | Seraing to Seraing | 151.5 km (94.1 mi) | Hilly stage | Victor Campenaerts (BEL) |
| 5 | 16 June | Tongeren to Beringen | 158.4 km (98.4 mi) | Flat stage | Bryan Coquard (FRA) |

== Stages ==
=== Stage 1 ===
12 June 2019 — Sint-Niklaas to Knokke-Heist, 183.4 km (114.0 mi)

Stage 1 result
| Rank | Rider | Team | Time |
|---|---|---|---|
| 1 | Jan-Willem van Schip (NED) | Roompot–Charles | 4h 15' 14" |
| 2 | Tim Merlier (BEL) | Corendon–Circus | + 4" |
| 3 | Fabio Jakobsen (NED) | Deceuninck–Quick-Step | + 4" |
| 4 | Lionel Taminiaux (BEL) | Wallonie Bruxelles | + 4" |
| 5 | Roy Jans (BEL) | Corendon–Circus | + 4" |
| 6 | Jasper Philipsen (BEL) | Belgium | + 4" |
| 7 | Daan Soete (BEL) | Pauwels Sauzen–Vastgoedservice | + 4" |
| 8 | Tom Van Asbroeck (BEL) | Israel Cycling Academy | + 6" |
| 9 | Arne Marit (BEL) | Belgium | + 6" |
| 10 | Rudy Barbier (FRA) | Israel Cycling Academy | + 6" |

General classification after stage 1
| Rank | Rider | Team | Time |
|---|---|---|---|
| 1 | Jan-Willem van Schip (NED) | Roompot–Charles | 4h 14' 57" |
| 2 | Tim Merlier (BEL) | Corendon–Circus | + 15" |
| 3 | Fabio Jakobsen (NED) | Deceuninck–Quick-Step | + 17" |
| 4 | Glenn Debruyne (BEL) | Cibel–Cebon | + 17" |
| 5 | Tom Dernies (BEL) | Natura4Ever–Roubaix–Lille Métropole | + 18" |
| 6 | Lionel Taminiaux (BEL) | Wallonie Bruxelles | + 21" |
| 7 | Roy Jans (BEL) | Corendon–Circus | + 21" |
| 8 | Jasper Philipsen (BEL) | Belgium | + 21" |
| 9 | Daan Soete (BEL) | Pauwels Sauzen–Vastgoedservice | + 21" |
| 10 | Tom Van Asbroeck (BEL) | Israel Cycling Academy | + 23" |

=== Stage 2 ===
13 June 2019 — Knokke-Heist to Zottegem, 179.9 km (111.8 mi)

Stage 2 result
| Rank | Rider | Team | Time |
|---|---|---|---|
| 1 | Remco Evenepoel (BEL) | Deceuninck–Quick-Step | 4h 26' 04" |
| 2 | Fabio Jakobsen (NED) | Deceuninck–Quick-Step | + 42" |
| 3 | Tim Merlier (BEL) | Corendon–Circus | + 42" |
| 4 | Lionel Taminiaux (BEL) | Wallonie Bruxelles | + 42" |
| 5 | Davide Martinelli (ITA) | Deceuninck–Quick-Step | + 42" |
| 6 | Jasper Philipsen (BEL) | Belgium | + 42" |
| 7 | Tom Van Asbroeck (BEL) | Israel Cycling Academy | + 42" |
| 8 | Alex Kirsch (LUX) | Trek–Segafredo | + 42" |
| 9 | Bryan Coquard (FRA) | Vital Concept–B&B Hotels | + 42" |
| 10 | Pieter Serry (BEL) | Deceuninck–Quick-Step | + 42" |

General classification after stage 2
| Rank | Rider | Team | Time |
|---|---|---|---|
| 1 | Remco Evenepoel (BEL) | Deceuninck–Quick-Step | 8h 41' 03" |
| 2 | Fabio Jakobsen (NED) | Deceuninck–Quick-Step | + 51" |
| 3 | Tim Merlier (BEL) | Corendon–Circus | + 51" |
| 4 | Jasper Philipsen (BEL) | Belgium | + 57" |
| 5 | Davide Martinelli (ITA) | Deceuninck–Quick-Step | + 59" |
| 6 | Tom Van Asbroeck (BEL) | Israel Cycling Academy | + 1' 00" |
| 7 | Tim Wellens (BEL) | Lotto–Soudal | + 1' 00" |
| 8 | Loïc Vliegen (BEL) | Wanty–Gobert | + 1' 00" |
| 9 | Lionel Taminiaux (BEL) | Wallonie Bruxelles | + 1' 01" |
| 10 | Bryan Coquard (FRA) | Vital Concept–B&B Hotels | + 1' 01" |

=== Stage 3 ===
14 June 2019 — Grimbergen to Grimbergen, 9.2 km (5.7 mi), individual time trial (ITT)

Stage 3 result
| Rank | Rider | Team | Time |
|---|---|---|---|
| 1 | Tim Wellens (BEL) | Lotto–Soudal | 10' 46" |
| 2 | Nathan Van Hooydonck (BEL) | Belgium | + 1" |
| 3 | Victor Campenaerts (BEL) | Lotto–Soudal | + 2" |
| 4 | Remco Evenepoel (BEL) | Deceuninck–Quick-Step | + 3" |
| 5 | Ryan Mullen (IRL) | Trek–Segafredo | + 4" |
| 6 | Christophe Laporte (FRA) | Cofidis | + 5" |
| 7 | Matthias Brändle (AUT) | Israel Cycling Academy | + 6" |
| 8 | Alex Kirsch (LUX) | Trek–Segafredo | + 8" |
| 9 | Lasse Norman Hansen (DEN) | Corendon–Circus | + 8" |
| 10 | Niki Terpstra (NED) | Total Direct Énergie | + 11" |

General classification after stage 3
| Rank | Rider | Team | Time |
|---|---|---|---|
| 1 | Remco Evenepoel (BEL) | Deceuninck–Quick-Step | 8h 51' 52" |
| 2 | Tim Wellens (BEL) | Lotto–Soudal | + 57" |
| 3 | Victor Campenaerts (BEL) | Lotto–Soudal | + 1' 00" |
| 4 | Christophe Laporte (FRA) | Cofidis | + 1' 03" |
| 5 | Alex Kirsch (LUX) | Trek–Segafredo | + 1' 06" |
| 6 | Toon Aerts (BEL) | Telenet–Fidea Lions | + 1' 17" |
| 7 | Brent Van Moer (BEL) | Lotto–Soudal | + 1' 18" |
| 8 | Jasper Philipsen (BEL) | Belgium | + 1' 18" |
| 9 | Jelle Wallays (BEL) | Lotto–Soudal | + 1' 19" |
| 10 | Bryan Coquard (FRA) | Vital Concept–B&B Hotels | + 1' 28" |

=== Stage 4 ===
15 June 2019 — Seraing to Seraing, 151.5 km (94.1 mi)

Stage 4 result
| Rank | Rider | Team | Time |
|---|---|---|---|
| 1 | Victor Campenaerts (BEL) | Lotto–Soudal | 3h 40' 16" |
| 2 | Andreas Kron (DEN) | Riwal Readynez | + 0" |
| 3 | Remco Evenepoel (BEL) | Deceuninck–Quick-Step | + 0" |
| 4 | Loïc Vliegen (BEL) | Wanty–Gobert | + 1' 03" |
| 5 | Jasper Philipsen (BEL) | Belgium | + 1' 05" |
| 6 | Otto Vergaerde (BEL) | Corendon–Circus | + 1' 05" |
| 7 | Toon Aerts (BEL) | Telenet–Fidea Lions | + 1' 05" |
| 8 | Mathieu Burgaudeau (FRA) | Total Direct Énergie | + 1' 05" |
| 9 | Daan Soete (BEL) | Pauwels Sauzen–Vastgoedservice | + 1' 05" |
| 10 | Jetse Bol (NED) | Burgos BH | + 1' 05" |

General classification after stage 4
| Rank | Rider | Team | Time |
|---|---|---|---|
| 1 | Remco Evenepoel (BEL) | Deceuninck–Quick-Step | 12h 32' 02" |
| 2 | Victor Campenaerts (BEL) | Lotto–Soudal | + 52" |
| 3 | Tim Wellens (BEL) | Lotto–Soudal | + 2' 02" |
| 4 | Toon Aerts (BEL) | Telenet–Fidea Lions | + 2' 28" |
| 5 | Andreas Kron (DEN) | Riwal Readynez | + 2' 29" |
| 6 | Jasper Philipsen (BEL) | Belgium | + 2' 29" |
| 7 | Loïc Vliegen (BEL) | Wanty–Gobert | + 2' 38" |
| 8 | Bryan Coquard (FRA) | Vital Concept–B&B Hotels | + 2' 39" |
| 9 | Aimé De Gendt (BEL) | Wanty–Gobert | + 2' 39" |
| 10 | Pieter Weening (NED) | Roompot–Charles | + 2' 39" |

=== Stage 5 ===
16 June 2019 — Tongeren to Beringen, 158.4 km (98.4 mi)

Stage 5 result
| Rank | Rider | Team | Time |
|---|---|---|---|
| 1 | Bryan Coquard (FRA) | Vital Concept–B&B Hotels | 3h 17' 15" |
| 2 | Pierre Barbier (FRA) | Natura4Ever–Roubaix–Lille Métropole | + 0" |
| 3 | Emīls Liepiņš (LAT) | Wallonie Bruxelles | + 0" |
| 4 | Tom Van Asbroeck (BEL) | Israel Cycling Academy | + 0" |
| 5 | Toon Aerts (BEL) | Telenet–Fidea Lions | + 0" |
| 6 | Jonas Rickaert (BEL) | Corendon–Circus | + 0" |
| 7 | Gijs Van Hoecke (BEL) | Belgium | + 0" |
| 8 | Corné van Kessel (NED) | Telenet–Fidea Lions | + 0" |
| 9 | Davide Martinelli (ITA) | Deceuninck–Quick-Step | + 0" |
| 10 | Kevin Van Melsen (BEL) | Wanty–Gobert | + 0" |

Final general classification
| Rank | Rider | Team | Time |
|---|---|---|---|
| 1 | Remco Evenepoel (BEL) | Deceuninck–Quick-Step | 15h 49' 17" |
| 2 | Victor Campenaerts (BEL) | Lotto–Soudal | + 52" |
| 3 | Tim Wellens (BEL) | Lotto–Soudal | + 2' 02" |
| 4 | Toon Aerts (BEL) | Telenet–Fidea Lions | + 2' 28" |
| 5 | Andreas Kron (DEN) | Riwal Readynez | + 2' 29" |
| 6 | Jasper Philipsen (BEL) | Belgium | + 2' 29" |
| 7 | Bryan Coquard (FRA) | Vital Concept–B&B Hotels | + 2' 29" |
| 8 | Loïc Vliegen (BEL) | Wanty–Gobert | + 2' 38" |
| 9 | Aimé De Gendt (BEL) | Wanty–Gobert | + 2' 39" |
| 10 | Pieter Weening (NED) | Roompot–Charles | + 2' 39" |

== Classification leadership table ==
In the 2019 Tour of Belgium, three different jerseys will be awarded. The general classification is calculated by adding each cyclist's finishing times on each stage. Time bonuses are awarded to the first three finishers on all stages: the stage winner wins a ten-second bonus, with six and four seconds for the second and third riders respectively. Bonus seconds will also be awarded to the first three riders at sprints in the "golden kilometre", where three intermediate sprint positions are to be held within the space of a kilometre. Three seconds are awarded for the winner of the sprint, two seconds for the rider in second and one second for the rider in third. The leader of the general classification receives a blue jersey. This classification is considered the most important of the 2019 Tour of Belgium, and the winner of the classification is considered the winner of the race.

Points for the points classification
| Position | 1 | 2 | 3 | 4 | 5 | 6 | 7 | 8 | 9 | 10 |
|---|---|---|---|---|---|---|---|---|---|---|
| Points awarded | 30 | 25 | 22 | 19 | 17 | 15 | 13 | 12 | 11 | 10 |

The second classification was the points classification. Riders were awarded points for finishing in the top ten in a stage. Unlike in the points classification in the Tour de France, the winners of all stages were awarded the same number of points. The leader of the points classification was awarded a red jersey. There was also a combativity classification, where riders received points for finishing in the top five at intermediate sprint points during each stage, on a 10–8–6–4–2 scale. Bonus points were awarded if a breakaway had gained a sufficient advantage over the field, up to a maximum of 5 points. There was also a classification for teams, in which the times of the best three cyclists in a team on each stage were added together; the leading team at the end of the race was the team with the lowest cumulative time.

| Stage | Winner | General classification (Dutch: Algemeenklassement) | Points classification (Dutch: Puntenklassement) | Combativity classification (Dutch: Strijdlustklassement) | Teams classification (Dutch: Ploegenklassement) |
|---|---|---|---|---|---|
| 1 | Jan-Willem van Schip | Jan-Willem van Schip | Jan-Willem van Schip | Thomas Sprengers | Roompot–Charles |
| 2 | Remco Evenepoel | Remco Evenepoel | Fabio Jakobsen | Thomas Sprengers | Deceuninck–Quick-Step |
| 3 | Tim Wellens | Remco Evenepoel | Fabio Jakobsen | Thomas Sprengers | Lotto–Soudal |
| 4 | Victor Campenaerts | Remco Evenepoel | Remco Evenepoel | Thomas Sprengers | Wanty–Gobert |
| 5 | Bryan Coquard | Remco Evenepoel | Remco Evenepoel | Thomas Sprengers | Wanty–Gobert |
| Final | | Remco Evenepoel | Remco Evenepoel | Thomas Sprengers | Wanty–Gobert |
