= 2025 Brabantse Pijl =

2025 UCI ProSeries
- Event poster with previous winners Benoît Cosnefroy and Elisa Longo Borghini

Race details
- Dates: 18 April 2025
- Stages: 1
- Distance: 162.6 km (101.0 mi)
- Winning time: 3h 35' 14"

Results
	Winner	Remco Evenepoel (BEL)	(Soudal–Quick-Step)
	Second	Wout van Aert (BEL)	(Visma–Lease a Bike)
	Third	António Morgado (POR)	(UAE Team Emirates XRG)

The 2025 Brabantse Pijl was the 65th edition of the Brabantse Pijl cycle race and was held on 18 April 2025 as a category 1.Pro race on the 2025 UCI ProSeries calendar. The race covered 162.6 km (101.0 mi), starting in Beersel and finishing in Overijse.

== Teams ==
23 teams participated in the race: ten of the eighteen UCI WorldTeams and thirteen UCI ProTeams.

UCI WorldTeams

- Alpecin–Deceuninck
- Cofidis
- EF Education–EasyPost
- Intermarché–Wanty
- Soudal–Quick-Step
- Team Bahrain Victorious
- Team Jayco–AlUla
- UAE Team Emirates XRG
- Visma–Lease a Bike
- XDS Astana Team

UCI ProTeams

- Caja Rural–Seguros RGA
- Equipo Kern Pharma
- Israel–Premier Tech
- Lotto
- Q36.5 Pro Cycling Team
- Team Flanders–Baloise
- Team Novo Nordisk
- Team TotalEnergies
- Tudor Pro Cycling Team
- Unibet Tietema Rockets
- Uno-X Mobility
- VF Group–Bardiani–CSF–Faizanè
- Wagner Bazin WB

== Result ==
Result (1-10)
Rank	Rider	Team	Time
1	Remco Evenepoel (BEL)	Soudal–Quick-Step	3h 35' 14"
2	Wout van Aert (BEL)	Visma–Lease a Bike	+ 0"
3	António Morgado (POR)	UAE Team Emirates XRG	+ 27"
4	Alex Aranburu (ESP)	Cofidis	+ 27"
5	Eduard Prades (ESP)	Caja Rural–Seguros RGA	+ 27"
6	Fabio Christen (SUI)	Q36.5 Pro Cycling Team	+ 27"
7	Neilson Powless (USA)	EF Education–EasyPost	+ 27"
8	Thomas Silva (URU)	Caja Rural–Seguros RGA	+ 27"
9	Milan Menten (BEL)	Lotto	+ 27"
10	Tibor Del Grosso (NED)	Alpecin–Deceuninck	+ 27"
