= 2026 Amstel Gold Race =

Cycling race

2026 UCI World Tour, race 17 of 36

Race details
- Dates: 19 April 2026
- Stages: 1
- Distance: 257.2 km (159.8 mi)
- Winning time: 5h 59' 40"

Results
	Winner	Remco Evenepoel (BEL)	(Red Bull–Bora–Hansgrohe)
	Second	Mattias Skjelmose (DEN)	(Lidl–Trek)
	Third	Benoît Cosnefroy (FRA)	(UAE Team Emirates XRG)

The 2026 Amstel Gold Race was a road cycling one-day race that took place on 19 April in the Netherlands. It was the 60th edition of the Amstel Gold Race and the 17th event of the 2026 UCI World Tour.

The race was won by Belgian rider Remco Evenepoel of Red Bull–Bora–Hansgrohe, beating defending champion Mattias Skjelmose of Lidl–Trek in a two-up sprint.

== Teams ==
All eighteen UCI WorldTeams and seven UCI ProTeams participated in the race.

UCI WorldTeams

- Alpecin–Premier Tech
- Decathlon CMA CGM
- EF Education–EasyPost
- Groupama–FDJ United
- INEOS Grenadiers
- Lotto–Intermarché
- Lidl–Trek
- Movistar Team
- NSN Cycling Team
- Red Bull–Bora–Hansgrohe
- Soudal–Quick-Step
- Team Bahrain Victorious
- Team Jayco–AlUla
- Team Picnic–PostNL
- UAE Team Emirates XRG
- Uno-X Mobility
- Visma–Lease a Bike
- XDS Astana Team

UCI ProTeams

- Caja Rural–Seguros RGA
- Cofidis
- Pinarello–Q36.5 Pro Cycling Team
- Team Flanders–Baloise
- Team TotalEnergies
- Tudor Pro Cycling Team
- Unibet Rose Rockets

== Result ==
Result
Rank	Rider	Team	Time
1	Remco Evenepoel (BEL)	Red Bull–Bora–Hansgrohe	5h 59' 40"
2	Mattias Skjelmose (DEN)	Lidl–Trek	+ 1"
3	Benoît Cosnefroy (FRA)	UAE Team Emirates XRG	+ 1' 59"
4	Romain Grégoire (FRA)	Groupama–FDJ United	+ 1' 59"
5	Emiel Verstrynge (BEL)	Alpecin–Premier Tech	+ 1' 59"
6	Mauro Schmid (SUI)	Team Jayco–AlUla	+ 1' 59"
7	Mauri Vansevenant (BEL)	Soudal–Quick-Step	+ 1' 59"
8	Albert Withen Philipsen (DEN)	Lidl–Trek	+ 1' 59"
9	Ewen Costiou (FRA)	Groupama–FDJ United	+ 1' 59"
10	Marco Frigo (ITA)	NSN Cycling Team	+ 1' 59"
