= 2026 Grand Prix Cycliste de Québec =

One-day cycling race in Canada

2026 UCI World Tour, race 33 of 36

Race details
- Dates: 11 September 2026
- Stages: 1
- Distance: 206 km (128 mi)
- Winning time: 4h 40' 21"

Results
	Winner	Remco Evenepoel (BEL)	(Red Bull–Bora–Hansgrohe)
	Second	Giulio Ciccone (ITA)	(Lidl–Trek)
	Third	Anthon Charmig (DEN)	(Uno-X Mobility)

The 2026 Grand Prix Cycliste de Québec was a road cycling one-day race that took place on 11 September 2026 in Quebec City, Canada. It was the 15th edition of the Grand Prix Cycliste de Québec and the 33rd event of the 2026 UCI World Tour.

== Teams ==
All eighteen UCI WorldTeams, three UCI ProTeams, and one national team made up the twenty-two teams that participated in the race.

UCI WorldTeams

- Alpecin–Premier Tech
- Decathlon CMA CGM
- EF Education–EasyPost
- Groupama–FDJ United
- Lidl–Trek
- Lotto–Intermarché
- Movistar Team
- Netcompany INEOS
- NSN Cycling Team
- Red Bull–Bora–Hansgrohe
- Soudal–Quick-Step
- Team Bahrain Victorious
- Team Jayco–AlUla
- Team Picnic–PostNL
- Visma–Lease a Bike
- UAE Team Emirates XRG
- Uno-X Mobility
- XDS Astana Team

UCI ProTeams

- Modern Adventure Pro Cycling
- Pinarello–Q36.5 Pro Cycling Team
- Tudor Pro Cycling Team

National Teams

- Canada

== Result ==
Result
Rank	Rider	Team	Time
1	Remco Evenepoel (BEL)	Red Bull–Bora–Hansgrohe	4h 40' 21"
2	Giulio Ciccone (ITA)	Lidl–Trek	+ 0"
3	Anthon Charmig (DEN)	Uno-X Mobility	+ 15"
4	Tom Pidcock (GBR)	Pinarello–Q36.5 Pro Cycling Team	+ 28"
5	Quinn Simmons (USA)	Lidl–Trek	+ 30"
6	Michael Matthews (AUS)	Team Jayco–AlUla	+ 35"
7	Paul Lapeira (FRA)	Decathlon CMA CGM	+ 43"
8	Matteo Jorgenson (USA)	Visma–Lease a Bike	+ 43"
9	Alessandro Pinarello (ITA)	NSN Cycling Team	+ 45"
10	Maximilian Schachmann (GER)	Soudal–Quick-Step	+ 47"
