= 2025 European Road Championships – Men's time trial =

Men's elite time trial
2025 European Road Championships

Race details
- Dates: 1 October 2025
- Stages: 1
- Distance: 24 km (14.91 mi)
- Winning time: 28:26.36

Medalists
	Gold	Remco Evenepoel (BEL)
	Silver	Filippo Ganna (ITA)
	Bronze	Niklas Larsen (DEN)

The men's elite time trial at the 2025 European Road Championships took place on 1 October 2025, in Guilherand-Granges, France.

== Results ==
Rank	#	Cyclist	Nation	Time	Diff.
1st place, gold medalist(s)	1	Remco Evenepoel	Belgium	28:26.36	
2nd place, silver medalist(s)	3	Filippo Ganna	Italy	29:09.73	+00:43.37
3rd place, bronze medalist(s)	18	Niklas Larsen	Denmark	29:34.92	+01:08.56
4	9	Ethan Hayter	Great Britain	29:35.62	+01:09.26
5	5	Joshua Tarling	Great Britain	29:36.97	+01:10.61
6	10	Daan Hoole	Netherlands	30:04.96	+01:38.60
7	6	Mathias Vacek	Czech Republic	30:10.31	+01:43.95
8	2	Stefan Küng	Switzerland	30:13.80	+01:47.44
9	8	Bruno Armirail	France	30:14.45	+01:48.09
10	15	Alec Segaert	Belgium	30:17.77	+01:51.41
11	4	Jakob Söderqvist	Sweden	30:20.07	+01:53.71
12	20	Maximilian Walscheid	Germany	30:28.83	+02:02.47
13	19	Rémi Cavagna	France	30:47.97	+02:21.61
14	17	Lorenzo Milesi	Italy	30:48.98	+02:22.62
15	7	Mads Pedersen	Denmark	30:52.08	+02:25.72
16	14	Alex Kirsch	Luxembourg	31:00.43	+02:34.07
17	26	Arthur Kluckers	Luxembourg	31:05.30	+02:38.94
18	16	Stefan Bissegger	Switzerland	31:06.23	+02:39.87
19	22	Nelson Oliveira	Portugal	31:06.91	+02:40.55
20	24	Artem Nych	Individual Neutral Athletes	31:10.09	+02:43.73
21	13	Miguel Heidemann	Germany	31:12.44	+02:46.08
22	12	Abel Balderstone	Spain	31:54.16	+03:27.80
23	30	Ognjen Ilić	Serbia	32:12.63	+03:46.27
24	27	Andrea Mifsud	Malta	32:39.07	+04:12.71
25	29	Danny van der Tuuk	Poland	33:28.20	+05:01.84
26	25	Borislav Palashev	Bulgaria	36:15.40	+07:49.04
27	23	Ahmet Can Akpınar	Turkey	36:21.41	+07:55.05
28	28	Ilie Seremet	Moldova	37:53.17	+09:26.81
29	31	Tahir Yiğit	Turkey	38:35.69	+10:09.33
30	21	Dylan van Baarle	Netherlands	39:12.19	+10:45.83
	11	João Almeida	Portugal	DNS	
