= Patrick Evenepoel =

Belgian cyclist

Personal information
- Born: 20 August 1968 (age 58) Etterbeek, Belgium

Cycling career
- Sport: Cycling
- Current team: Retired
- Discipline: Road
- Role: Rider

Professional teams
- 1991: Histor–Sigma
- 1992–1994: Collstrop–Garden Wood

Major wins
- One-day races and Classics Grand Prix de Wallonie (1993)

Patrick Evenepoel (born 20 August 1968) is a retired Belgian racing cyclist. In 1993, he took his most significant win at the Grand Prix de Wallonie. The same year, Evenepoel rode in his only Grand Tour, the Vuelta a España, where he placed 113th of 114 finishers.

After his cycling career, Evenepoel worked as a plasterer. He is the father of cyclist and Olympic gold medalist Remco Evenepoel.

== Major results ==
1987
1st Overall GP Général Patton
1991
1st Seraing-Aachen-Seraing
1992
3rd Brussel-Ingooigem
8th Paris–Camembert
10th Zomergem - Adinkerke
1993
1st Grand Prix de Wallonie
