= Figueira Champions Classic =

Cycling race held in Portugal

Race details
- Date: February
- Region: Portugal
- Discipline: Road
- Competition: UCI ProSeries
- Type: One-day race
- Web site: www.figueirachampionsclassic.com

History
- First edition: 2023
- Editions: 4 (as of 2026)
- First winner: Casper Pedersen (DEN)
- Most wins: António Morgado (POR) (2 wins)
- Most recent: António Morgado (POR)

The Figueira Champions Classic is a one-day road cycling race held in Portugal annually since 2023. It is held as a category 1.Pro event on the UCI ProSeries, having upgraded from the UCI Europe Tour in 2024.

== Winners ==
Year	Country	Rider	Team
2023	Denmark	Casper Pedersen	Soudal–Quick-Step
2024	Belgium	Remco Evenepoel	Soudal–Quick-Step
2025	Portugal	António Morgado	UAE Team Emirates XRG
2026	Portugal	António Morgado	UAE Team Emirates XRG
