= Remco Evenepoel =

Belgian cyclist (born 2000)

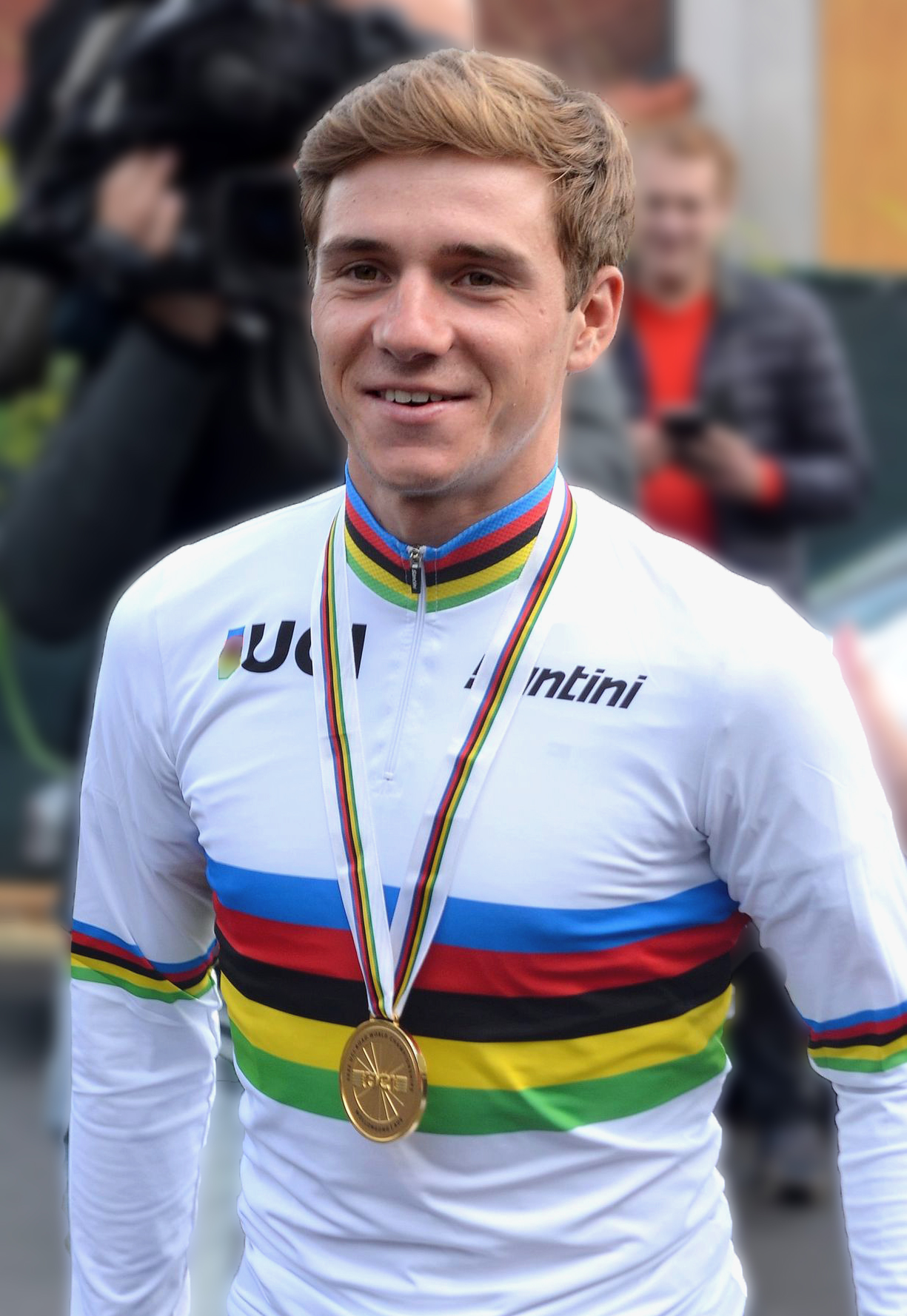
- Evenepoel as World Champion in 2022

Personal information
- Nickname: Aerobullet
- Born: 25 January 2000 (age 26) Aalst, East Flanders, Belgium
- Height: 1.71 m (5 ft 7 in)
- Weight: 63 kg (139 lb)

Cycling career
- Sport: Cycling
- Current team: Red Bull–Bora–Hansgrohe
- Discipline: Road
- Role: Rider
- Rider type: All-rounder; Time trialist; Classics Specialist

Amateur teams
- 2017: Forte Young CT
- 2018: Acrog–Pauwels Sauzen

Professional teams
- 2019–2025: Deceuninck–Quick-Step
- 2026–: Red Bull–Bora–Hansgrohe

Major wins
- Grand Tours Tour de France Young rider classification (2024) 4 individual stages (2024, 2025, 2026) Giro d'Italia 2 individual stages (2023) Vuelta a España General classification (2022) Mountains classification (2023) Young rider classification (2022) 5 individual stages (2022, 2023) Stage races Tour de Pologne (2020) UAE Tour (2023) Danmark Rundt (2021) Tour of Belgium (2019, 2021) Tour of Norway (2022) Volta ao Algarve (2020, 2022, 2024) Vuelta a Burgos (2020) Vuelta a San Juan (2020) Volta a la Comunitat Valenciana (2026) One-day races and Classics Olympic Games Road Race (2024) Olympic Games Time Trial (2024) World Road Race Championships (2022) World Time Trial Championships (2023, 2024, 2025, 2026) European Road Race Championships (2026) European Time Trial Championships (2019, 2025) National Road Race Championships (2023) National Time Trial Championships (2022, 2025) Liège–Bastogne–Liège (2022, 2023) Amstel Gold Race (2026) Clásica de San Sebastián (2019, 2022, 2023, 2026) GP de Québec (2026) Brussels Cycling Classic (2021) Coppa Bernocchi (2021) Figueira Champions Classic (2024) Brabantse Pijl (2025) Other Vélo d'Or (2022)
Medal record
Event	1st	2nd	3rd
Olympic Games	2	0	0
World Championships	7	2	2
European Championships	5	2	1
Total	14	4	3
Men's road bicycle racing
Representing Belgium
Olympic Games Olympic Games
Gold medal – first place	2024 Paris	Road race
Gold medal – first place	2024 Paris	Time trial
World Championships
Gold medal – first place	2022 Wollongong	Road race
Gold medal – first place	2023 Stirling	Time trial
Gold medal – first place	2024 Zurich	Time trial
Gold medal – first place	2025 Kigali	Time trial
Gold medal – first place	2026 Montreal	Time trial
Silver medal – second place	2019 Yorkshire	Time trial
Silver medal – second place	2025 Kigali	Road race
Bronze medal – third place	2021 Flanders	Time trial
Bronze medal – third place	2022 Wollongong	Time trial
European Championships
Gold medal – first place	2019 Alkmaar	Time trial
Gold medal – first place	2025 Guilherand-Granges	Time trial
Gold medal – first place	2026 Ljubljana	Road race
Silver medal – second place	2021 Trento	Road race
Silver medal – second place	2025 Guilherand-Granges	Road race
Bronze medal – third place	2021 Trento	Time trial

Remco Evenepoel (Dutch pronunciation: [ˈrɛmkoː ˈeːvənəpul]; born 25 January 2000) is a Belgian professional cyclist and Olympic gold medalist who currently rides for UCI WorldTeam Red Bull–Bora–Hansgrohe.

Evenepoel is regarded as the best time trialist of his generation; he is a four-time UCI world champion (2023, 2024, 2025 and 2026), Olympic champion (2024), and two-time European champion (2019 and 2026). He has also found success in one-day classics, winning Liège–Bastogne–Liège twice in 2022 and 2023, the UCI road race world championship in 2022, and Olympic road race in 2024. Evenepoel also won the Vuelta a España in 2022, becoming the first Belgian to win a Grand Tour since 1978.

The son of former cyclist Patrick Evenepoel, Remco began his sporting career as a footballer, playing as a midfielder in the youth ranks of R.S.C. Anderlecht, PSV Eindhoven, and the Belgian national youth teams. After switching to cycling in 2017, he dominated the junior ranks by winning the road race and time trial in the junior categories at the 2018 UCI Road World Championships. Evenepoel elected to skip the under-23 level, turning professional in 2019 with Deceuninck–Quick-Step (now Soudal–Quick-Step). In his debut professional season, he became the youngest winner of a UCI WorldTour race by winning the Clásica de San Sebastián at age 19.

After a career-threatening injury in 2020 at Il Lombardia, Evenepoel returned to racing at the 2021 Giro d'Italia. For his achievements in 2022, Evenepoel was awarded the Vélo d'Or, given to the most successful cyclist of the season. In 2024, Evenepoel made his debut at the Tour de France, where he placed third overall behind Tadej Pogačar and Jonas Vingegaard, also taking home the young rider's classification. Shortly after the Tour, Evenepoel became the only male cyclist to win both the Olympic time trial and road race, achieving both at the 2024 Summer Olympics.

== Early life and football ==
Remco Evenepoel was born on 25 January 2000 in Aalst, Belgium to Agna and Patrick Evenepoel. His father was briefly a professional cyclist, best known for winning the 1993 Grand Prix de Wallonie, before working as a plasterer, while his mother was a hairdresser. Evenepoel started his sporting career as a football player, joining R.S.C. Anderlecht's youth academy at the age of five. At eleven, he switched to PSV Eindhoven before returning to Anderlecht three years later. Among his teammates in the PSV youth teams were Jay Idzes, Rico Zeegers and Sekou Sidibe.

Evenepoel played primarily as a defensive midfielder and left back. At one point, he was considered one of Belgium's most promising talents, making nine appearances for Belgium's U15 and U16 teams. Although Evenepoel himself admitted in 2020 he "didn't have the best technique", he was well regarded for his stamina and leadership, captaining both Anderlecht and Belgium's youth teams. During this time, Evenepoel also showed promise as a runner. At age 16, without any dedicated training, he entered the Brussels Half-Marathon, running the day after a football match, and finished 13th in 1:16:15. After suffering a pelvic fracture during a match, his football career took a downturn and he was released by Anderlecht in 2016. Evenepoel joined KV Mechelen, who were prepared to offer him a professional contract after another six months, but Evenepoel instead chose to quit and pursue cycling full-time.

== Cycling career ==
=== Junior career ===
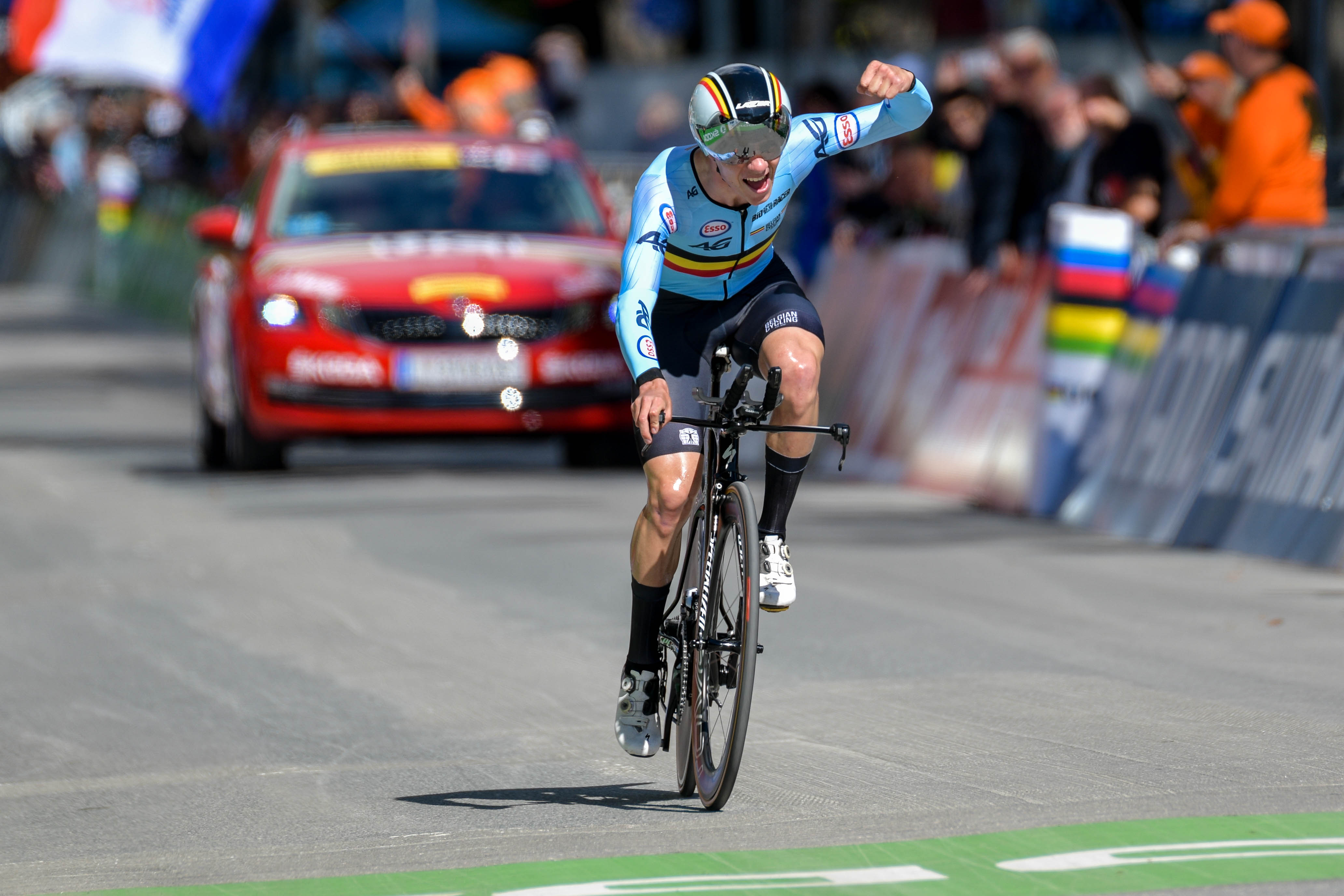
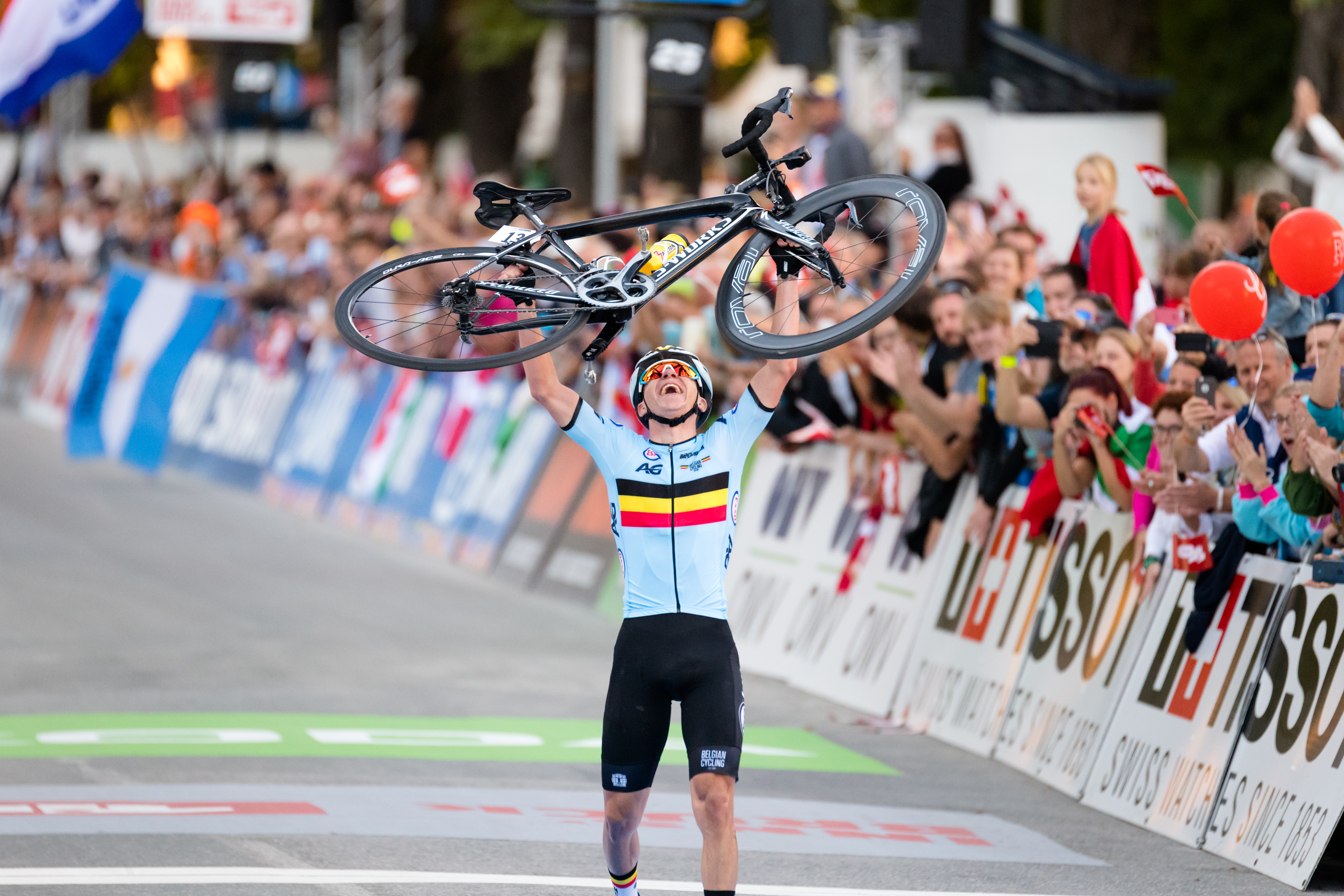
Evenepoel won both the junior time trial and road race at the 2018 UCI Road World Championships.

In 2017, Evenepoel began cycling full-time. Initially, he was coached by Fred Vandervennet, former three-time Belgian marathon champion and friend of his father. In his first races, Evenepoel struggled with bike handling and riding in groups, with youth teammate Danny van der Tuuk recalling Evenepoel "couldn't finish races" because of how often he crashed. His first win came in his tenth race as a junior.

He won both the time trial and road race at the 2018 European Junior Road Cycling Championships. The gap between him and the second place rider in the road race was 9 minutes and 44 seconds over a distance of 118.8 km.

Later in the year, Evenepoel also won both the road race and the time trial at the UCI Junior Road World Championships.

=== Deceuninck–Quick-Step ===
==== 2019 — professional debut ====
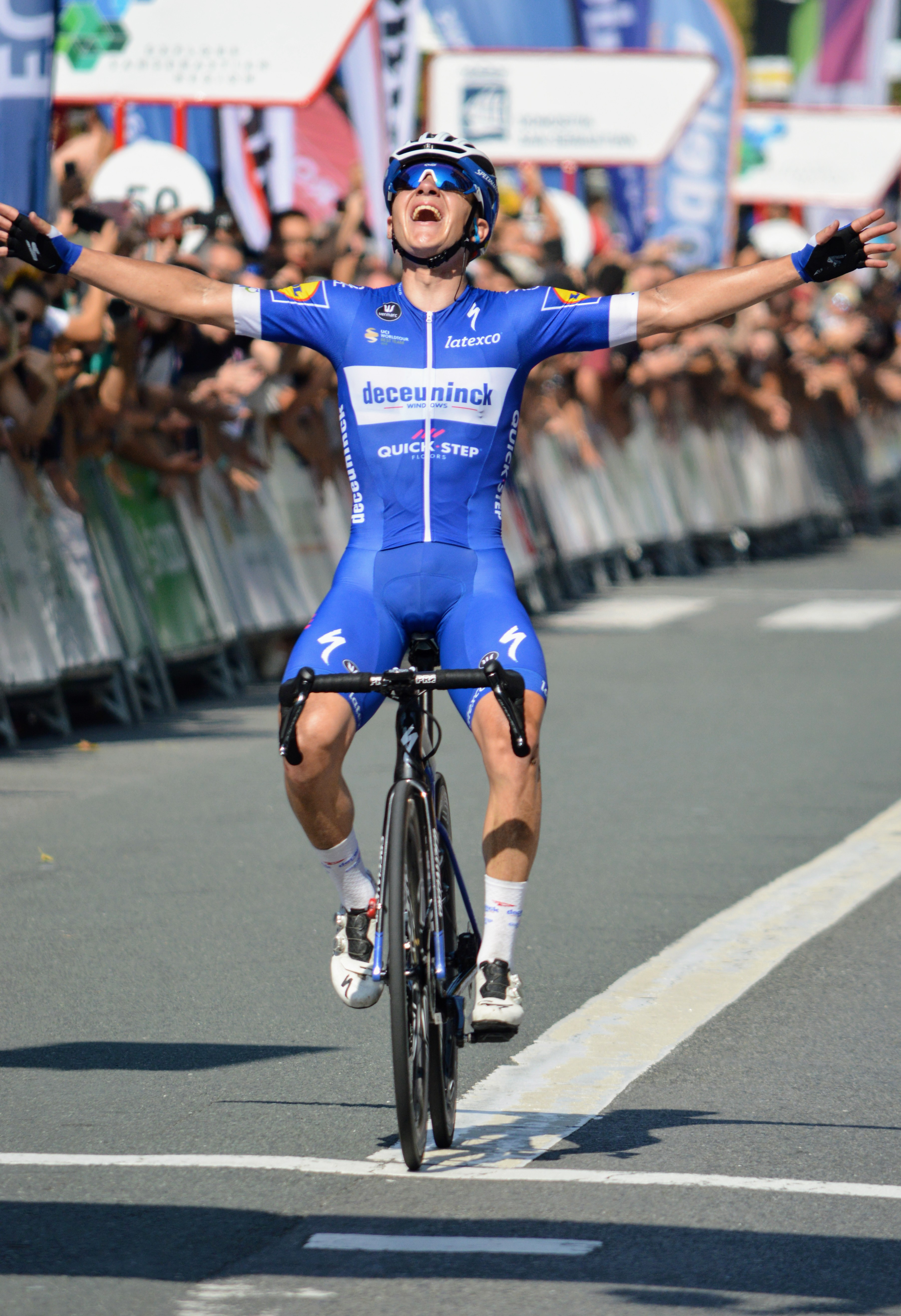
Evenepoel celebrating victory at the 2019 Clásica de San Sebastián

Electing to skip the under-23 ranks, Evenepoel announced in July 2018 that he would join Deceuninck–Quick-Step for the 2019 season. For his first season, Evenepoel was scheduled to compete in shorter stage races, and skipped the cobbled, one-day Classic races. In his debut race, the Vuelta a San Juan, Evenepoel won the young rider classification and 9th overall whilst also winning his first professional podium in the stage 3 time trial behind teammate Julian Alaphilippe and Valerio Conti. Evenepoel's first professional victory came at the Tour of Belgium, where he won the general classification as well as a stage and the points classification. On 3 August 2019 Evenepoel scored his first World Tour victory when he won the Clásica de San Sebastián. He escaped from the field, accompanied by Toms Skujiņš about 20 km (12 mi) from the finish, dropping his companion on the last hill and soloing to victory. He became the third-youngest rider ever to win a cycling classic in the history of the sport. On 8 August 2019, Evenepoel won the time trial at the 2019 European Road Championships. At the World Championships in September, Evenepoel would have been eligible to still ride in the under-23 category, but decided against it and started in the elite men's events. He went on to win the silver medal in the time trial. He spent much of the year sharing a room with Philippe Gilbert who acted in a mentoring role.

==== 2020 — career threatening crash ====
Evenepoel started the 2020 season at the Vuelta a San Juan, where he won the individual time trial on stage 3 and the general classification. He then competed at the Volta ao Algarve. Here, he won stage 2 as well as the final stage, a time trial, to clinch overall victory ahead of Maximilian Schachmann.

After the extended break in the cycling calendar due to the COVID-19 pandemic, he won the Vuelta a Burgos and the Tour de Pologne.

Evenepoel suffered a serious accident at Il Lombardia on 16 August 2020. While descending the Muro di Sormano and after a sharp curve, he collided with a low wall on the side of a bridge and was thrown over it with the impact, falling in a dirt area near some trees, roughly 9 metres (30 ft) below the road. No other cyclists were involved in the accident and he was swiftly removed from the scene by the emergency services, being conscious and responsive all the time. Hours later, his team reported that he had suffered a fractured pelvis and a right lung contusion, also stating that he would not be returning to competition in the near future.

==== 2021 — first Grand Tour ====
Evenepoel returned to competition in the 2021 Giro d'Italia, finishing 7th in the prologue time trial, after which he said: "I was standing on the start ramp with some tears in my eyes. It was a hard way to come back and start the Giro like this. But immediately a top-10 spot, I didn't expect it – I'm really happy." After spending the first 15 stages in the top-10 of the general classification, he crashed during stage 17 and was unable to continue the race.

He competed in the rescheduled 2020 Summer Olympics in Tokyo in both the road race and time trial earning a top 10 place in the latter. During the 2021 World Championships in Flanders he claimed his second elite level world championship medal, taking the bronze in the time trial. Evenepoel was the centre of a furore in the World road race. Ahead of the race, it was felt that Wout van Aert was the protected leader for a Belgian team that was very hopeful of a home win, and Eddy Merckx stated to Het Nieuwsblad that "If there is only one leader, you really shouldn't take Evenepoel [...] He rides mainly for himself; we saw that at the Olympics". Evenepoel responded "He always has to say something and that's a shame [...] Maybe it stings that I didn't ride for his son's team. I have a lot of respect for Eddy and apparently that is not mutual." On the race ahead "I'm here to work for Belgium, for Wout, because I know that it's the chance of his life to be world champion. He's in the form of his life, and it would be stupid of me to ride for myself. On this parcours, no one is stronger than Wout. I said already a lot of times that I will do everything [for] Wout."

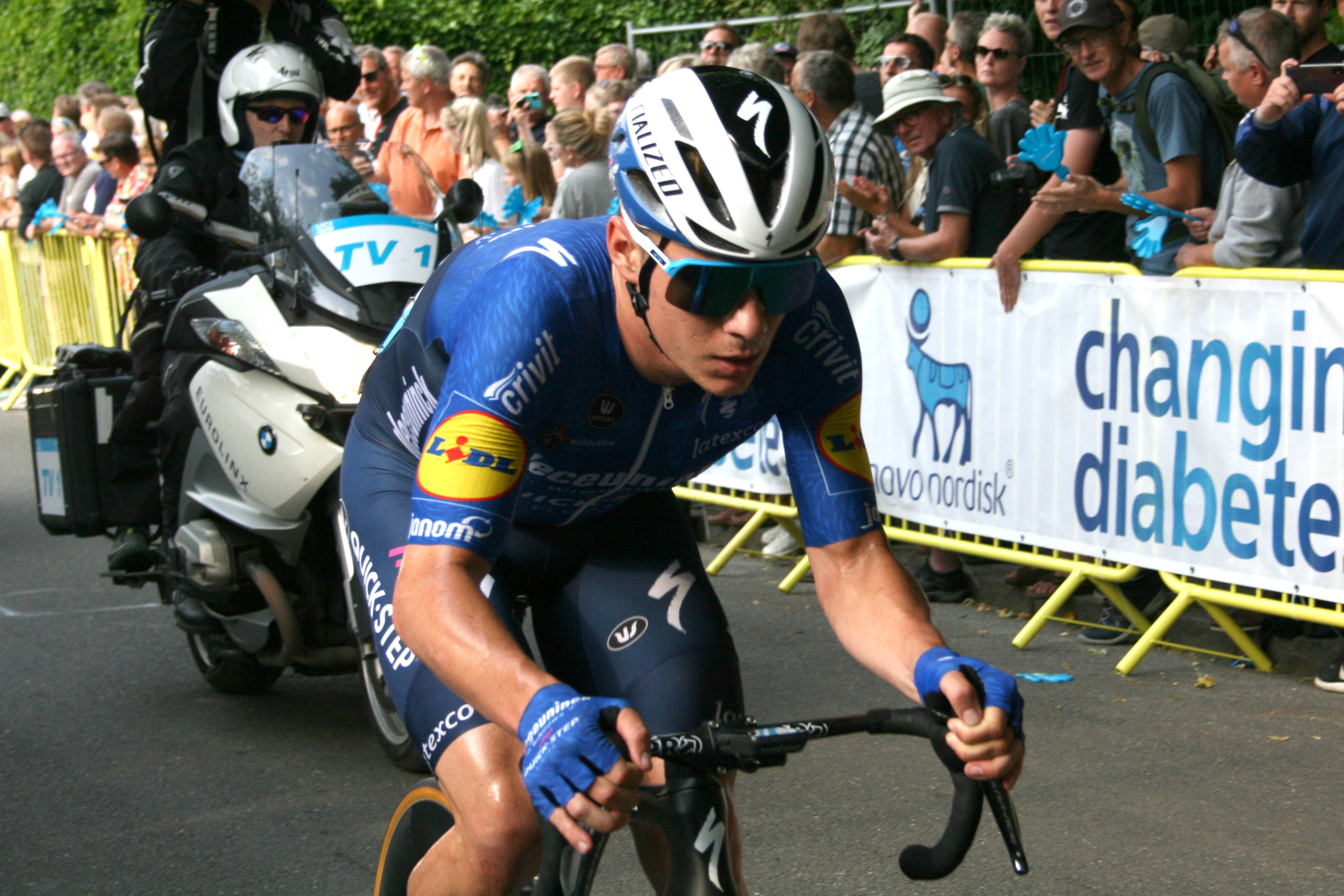
Evenepoel at the 2021 Danmark Rundt, which he won.

In the road race Evenepoel appeared to answer Merckx' criticism that he is a selfish cyclist by joining an early attack with 180 km still to race, followed by a second mid-race attack, and then created the decisive selection in the finals laps. Van Aert was unable to win the race, which was won by Julian Alaphilippe. After the race, people from the world of cycling such as Evenepoel's trade team boss Patrick Lefevere praised Evenepoel's strength and wondered if the Belgian team had made the wrong choice of leader. Lefevere asked: "[W]hy did the Belgians want to break open the race so early? And above all, why did they throw Remco into the fray so early? For me, Remco was the best man in the race after Julian. But they just sacrificed him and rolled out the red carpet for Julian."

Evenepoel responded to the criticism of Belgium's tactics by revealing that he felt he could have won the race but that "[o]n Friday evening before the World Championships there was a meeting with everyone. It was very unclear to me what exactly was expected of me. So after sleeping on it, the next day I went to coaches Sven Vanthourenhout and Serge Pauwels and asked: 'What do you expect from me in concrete terms?' "I also said straight out that I thought I might be able to win the race in a certain scenario. 'Do I get a chance or not?' I asked. 'No,' was the answer." This caused a rift in the team; Van Aert said "I expected to hear criticism because we didn't win but that it came from someone on the team is not smart and only serves to add fuel to the fire. It's a shame, and I regret it. Remco issued more criticism on TV than in the team meeting" and "He was the one who agreed with the tactics, who agreed with the selection. He has been preaching for weeks on end how he was looking forward to it so I think it's really weird to turn 180 degrees now".

Days after the race Belgian team-mate Jasper Stuyven said that Evenepoel had failed to show up for the team debrief: "Everyone was there, except Remco [...] He was aware, but didn't think it was necessary. I think that is a shame, especially because he thought it necessary to say things on TV. That stuck with some of us. [...] I think that Remco should sometimes be slowed down by his entourage. He still has to learn when he can and cannot say things. Also, a super-strong rider – which he certainly is – should realise that some things should remain internal."

==== 2022 — Grand Tour, Monument, and World Championship victory ====
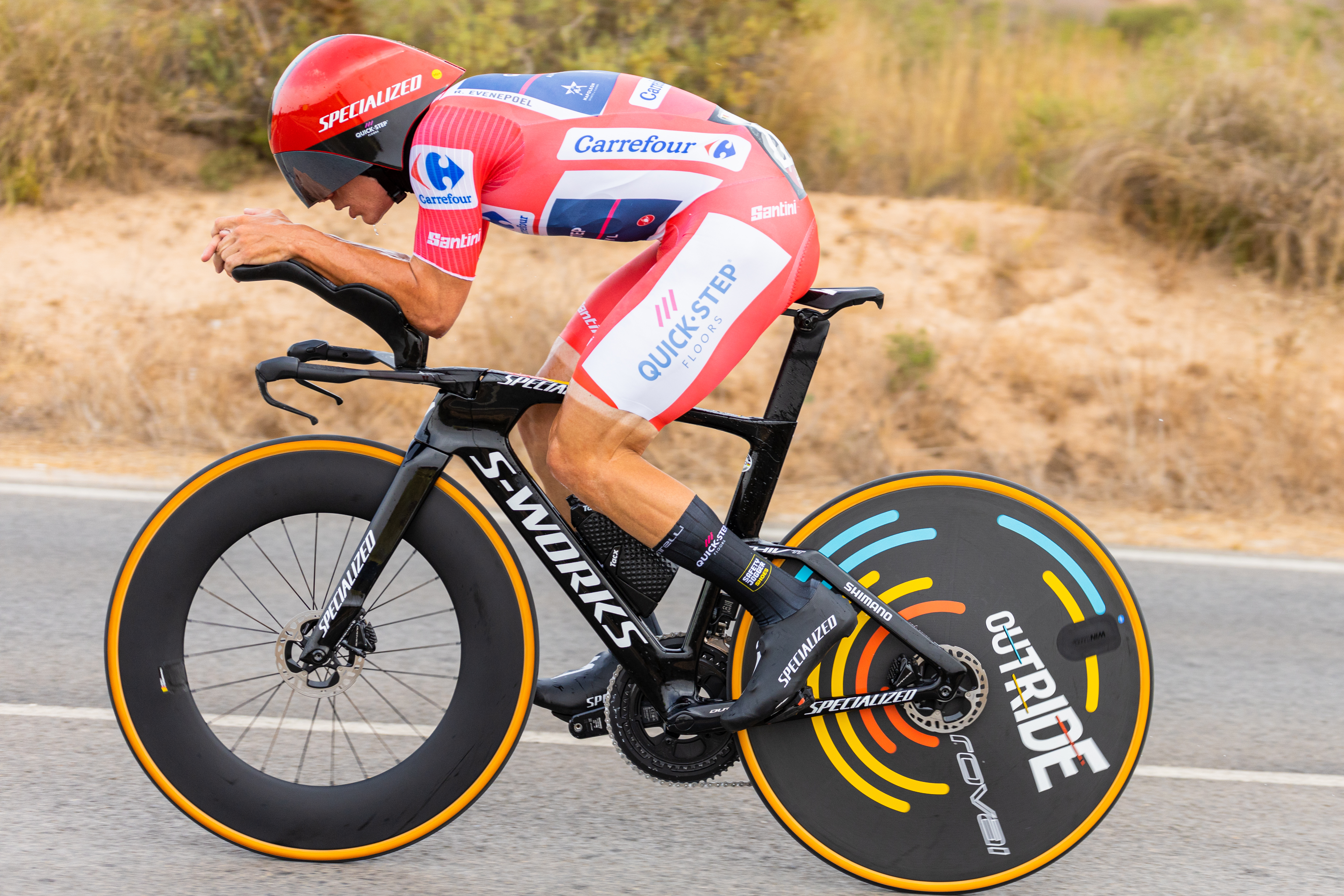
Evenepoel wearing the Red Jersey at the 2022 Vuelta a España

On 24 April, at the age of 22, Evenepoel won his first cycling monument in Liège–Bastogne–Liège after a 29.6 km solo effort with a 48-second lead on the runner-up. It was his first participation in this cycling classic. He completed the 257.1 km with an average speed of 41.397 km/h, which was the fastest edition in the history of La Doyenne. He won the 2022 Clásica de San Sebastián by launching a successful 44 kilometre solo attack, finishing nearly two minutes ahead of second-placed Pavel Sivakov.

In early September, Evenepoel won the 2022 Vuelta a España, his first Grand Tour triumph. Evenepoel took the red jersey after stage 6 of the race, which finished with a 800m climb to a mountain-top finish in San Miguel de Aguayo. While the stage was won by Jay Vine, Evenepoel managed to finish second, putting significant time into his general classification rivals, including Primož Roglič, the pre-race favorite. Evenepoel extended his general classification lead to 2 minutes and 41 seconds after a dominant performance on the stage 10 individual time trial, finishing the 30.9 km course in 33 minutes and 18 seconds, 48 seconds ahead of second-place Roglič. The following challenging mountain stages saw Roglič and Enric Mas claw back some time, reducing Evenepoel's general classification lead to as little as 1 minute and 26 seconds. However, following Roglič's withdrawal from the race after a crash at the end of stage 16, Evenepoel won stage 18, another mountain-top finish, securing a 2-minute and 7-second advantage over Mas, which would prove unassailable over the final 2 stages. Arriving in Madrid, Evenepoel's margin of victory was 2 minutes and 2 seconds over second place Mas and 4 minutes and 57 seconds over third place Juan Ayuso.

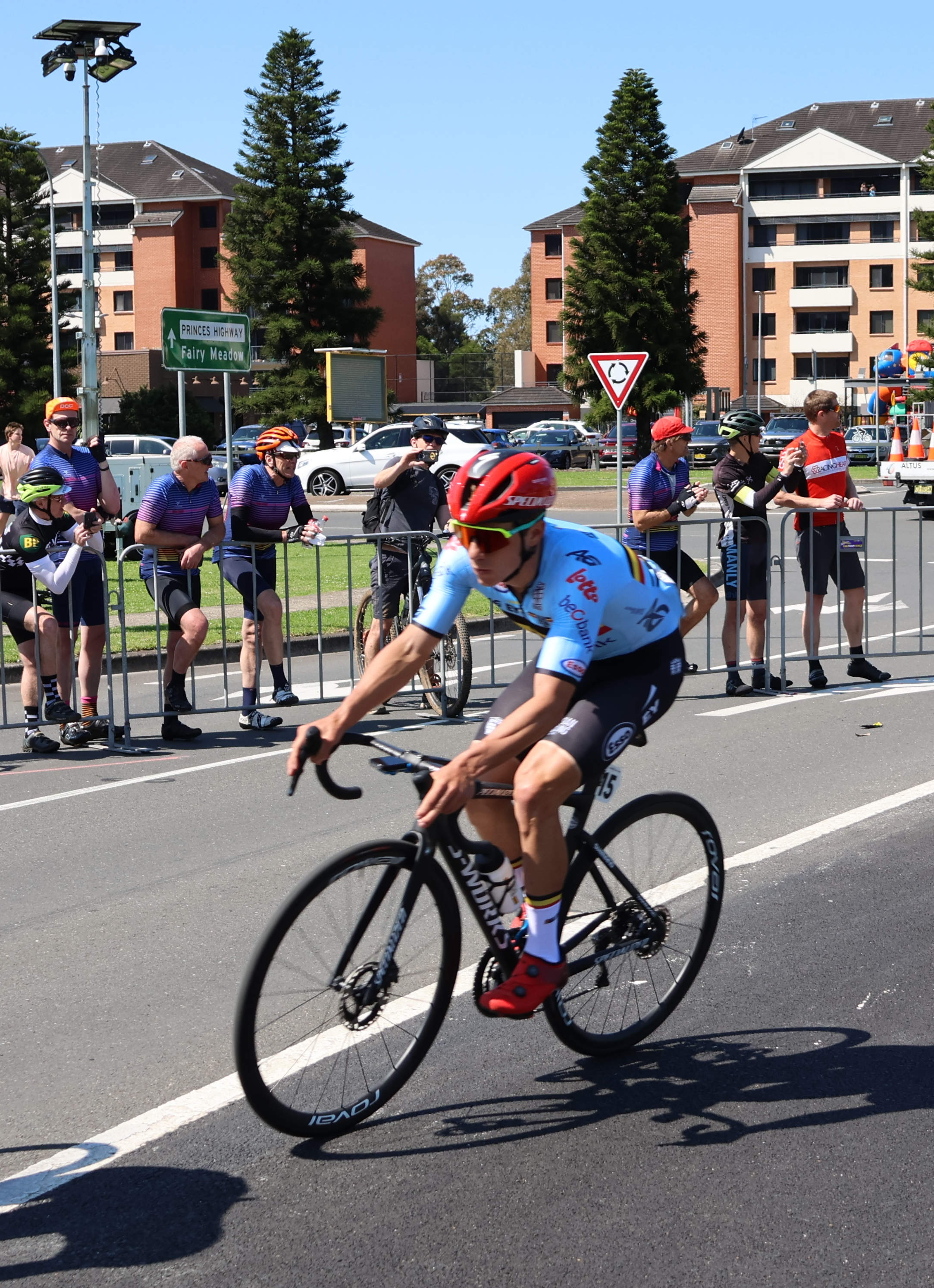
Evenepoel at the 2022 UCI Road World Championships

In September, Evenepoel competed in both the Individual Time Trial and Road Race at the 2022 UCI Road World Championships in Wollongong, Australia. He finished 3rd in the time trial, 9 seconds behind winner Tobias Foss. One week later, he won the road race, finishing two minutes and 21 seconds ahead of France's Christophe Laporte. Having made it into a breakaway with 32 km to go, Evenepoel managed to break free from Alexey Lutsenko with 25 km to go and ride solo to the finish for his first World Championship victory at the Elite level.

==== 2023 — time trial World Champion ====
On 23 April, Evenepoel won Liège-Bastogne-Liège, winning the Monument for the second year in a row. He launched an attack on Côte de La Redoute; he attacked in the saddle, moving away from the peloton and only Tom Pidcock was able to follow him. A few kilometres later, Evenepoel pushed hard on the pedals again and left Pidcock trailing, soloing 30 kilometres to retain the title.

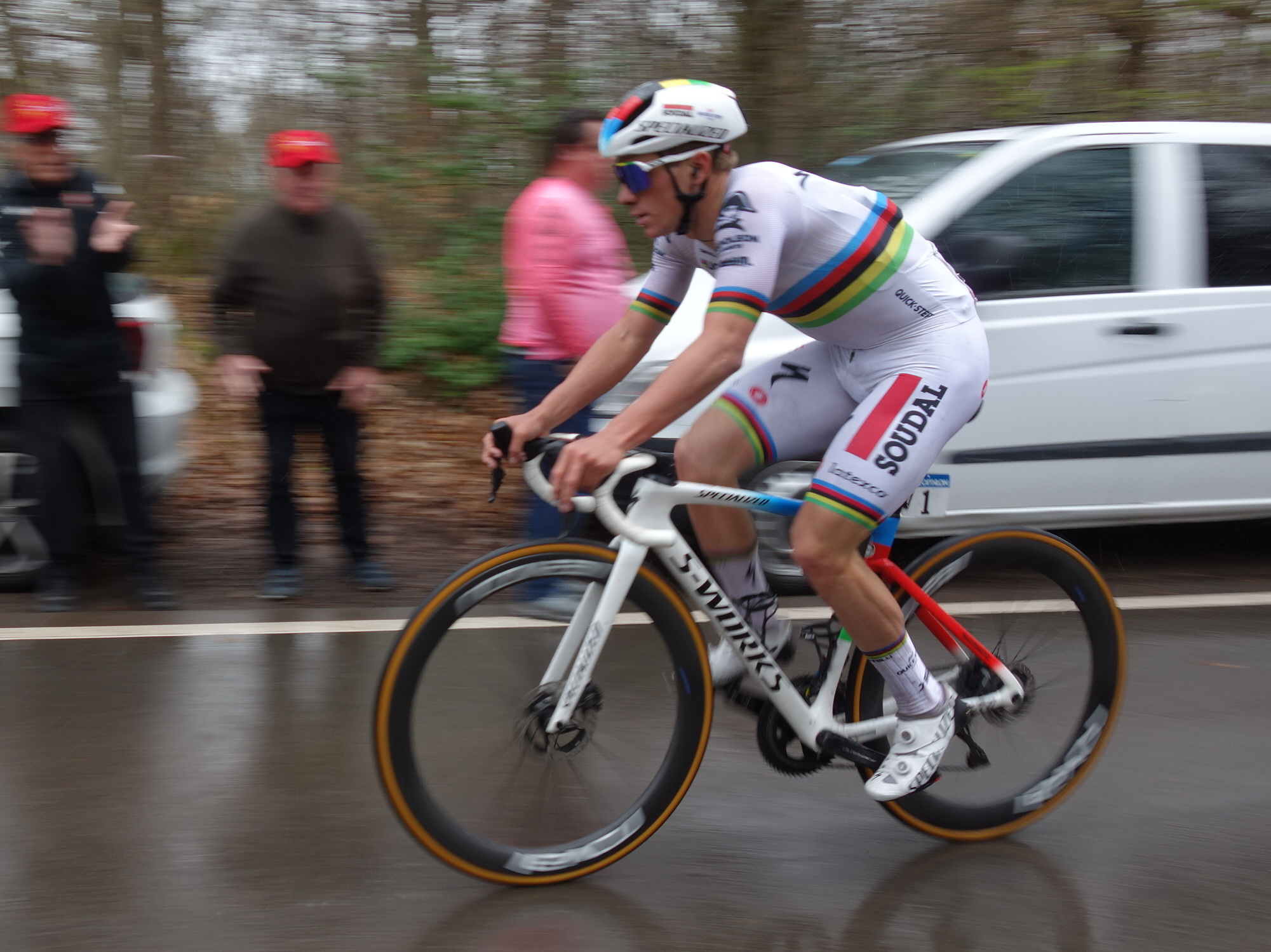
Evenepoel at the 2023 Liège–Bastogne–Liège

In May, Evenepoel competed in the Giro d'Italia as one of the main favourites for victory. In the opening day time trial to Ortona, he won the stage to take the race leader's pink jersey, in the process gaining significant time on his general classification rivals. After losing the race lead to Andreas Leknessund during the first week of the race, he reclaimed it following his victory in the stage 9 individual time trial. However, following a positive test for COVID-19 that same evening, Evenepoel was forced to withdraw from the race, handing the race lead to Geraint Thomas.

Following his recovery, Evenepoel competed in the Tour de Suisse. Here, he won stage 7 of the race, attacking on the last part of the stage neutralized for times on the general classification, following Gino Mäder's death due to a crash on a descent two days prior. Evenepoel dedicated his victory to Mäder. He eventually finished the Tour de Suisse in third position overall. After the Tour de Suisse, Evenepoel contested the national championships. In the time trial, he placed only fourth following a crash on a wet course. On 25 June, he won the road race championship for the first time in his career, outsprinting Alec Segaert (Lotto–Dstny) at the finish line. Later that summer, he took his third victory at the Clásica de San Sebastián, coming out ahead in a two-man sprint against Pello Bilbao.

On 11 August he won the time trial at the 2023 UCI Road World Championships in Scotland, becoming the second cyclist (after Abraham Olano) to win both the road race and the time trial at the World Championships.

==== 2024 — double Olympic champion ====
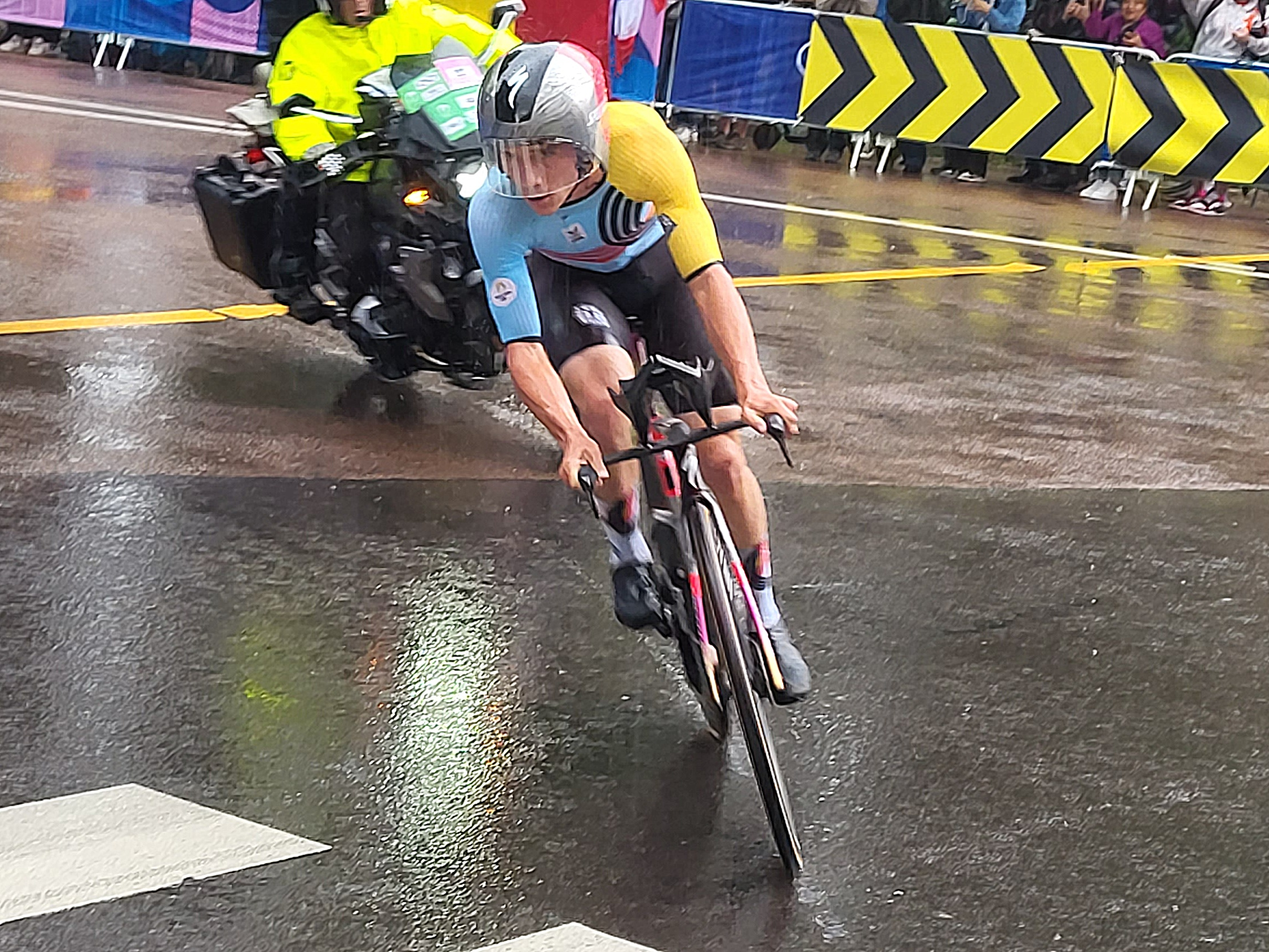
Evenepoel on his way to victory at the Olympic Time Trial at the 2024 Paris Olympics

Evenepoel began his 2024 season with a win at the Figueira Champions Classic on February 11, completing a 53 km solo effort to victory. He then secured the overall classification at the Tour of the Algarve from February 14 to 18, with a notable performance in the stage 4 time trial, winning by 16 seconds.

In Paris-Nice, held from March 3 to 10, Evenepoel won the points and mountains classifications, while finishing second overall. He won the final stage 8, but despite repeated attacks, wasn't able to distance himself from Matteo Jorgenson, the general classification winner.

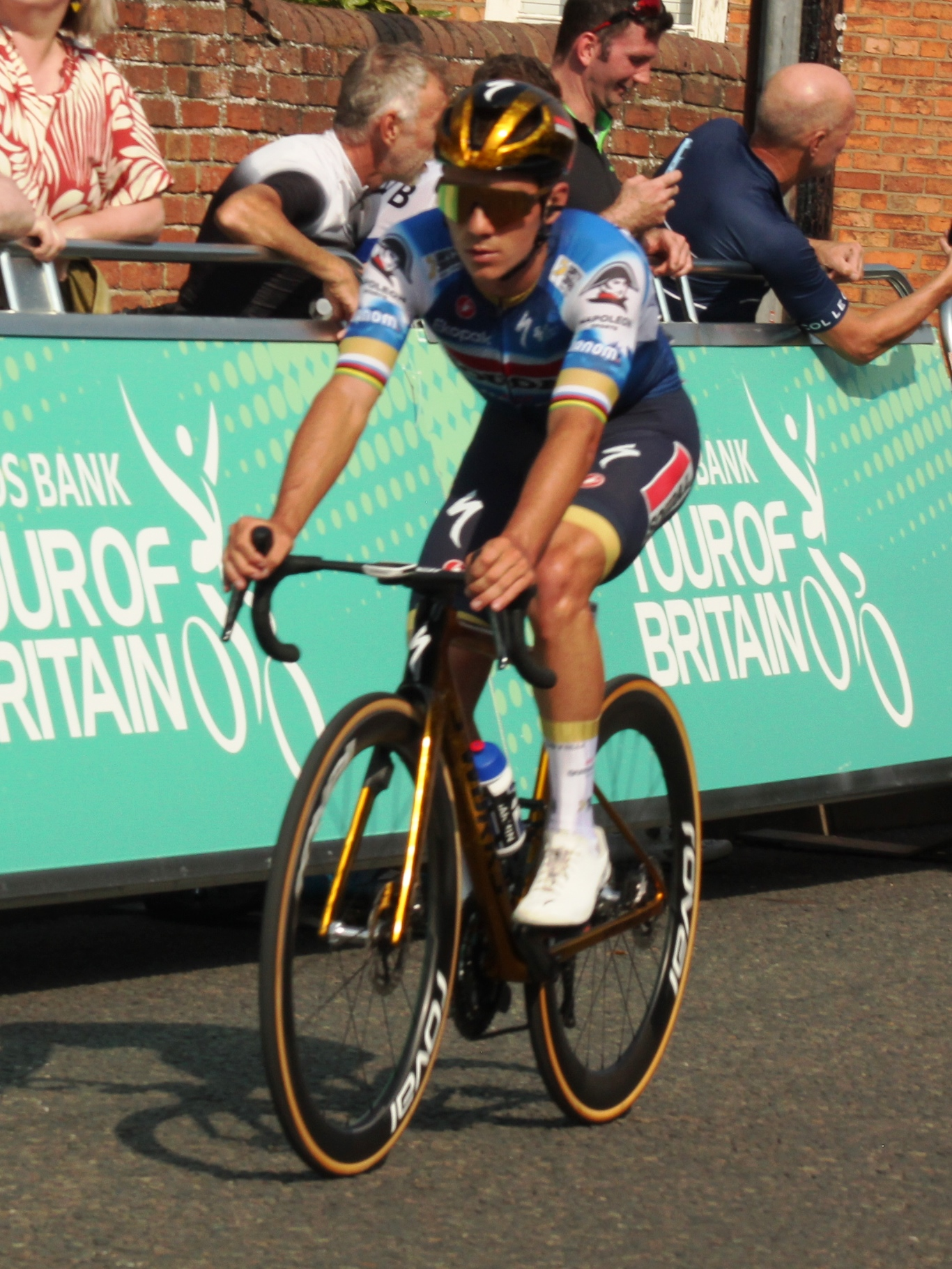
Evenepoel wearing golden helmet and riding a golden bike after his Olympic medals

During the Tour of the Basque Country, from April 1 to 6, Evenepoel abandoned the race due to injury following a serious crash on stage 4. The incident occurred during a high-speed descent and led to the neutralization of the race, affecting several other favorites, including Jonas Vingegaard and Primož Roglič. Despite the severity of the crash, Evenepoel managed to walk to medical assistance on his own. He sustained a broken collarbone and scapula, requiring surgery, which was successfully completed on April 6.

Evenepoel made his race debut at the 2024 Tour de France, held from June 29 - July 21. He was initially viewed as one of the three favorites to win the overall classification, alongside Jonas Vingegaard and Tadej Pogacar. Evenepoel won one stage, the individual time trial on stage 7, where he bested Pogacar and Vingegaard by 12 and 37 seconds respectively. He finished the Tour third overall, 3 minutes behind Vingegaard, 9 minutes behind Pogacar, and secured the best young rider's white jersey.

On July 27, just 6 days after the conclusion of the Tour de France, Evenepoel won gold in the Olympic Time Trial at the 2024 Paris Olympics, finishing 15 seconds ahead of Filippo Ganna. A week later on August 3 he also won Olympic gold in the road race despite suffering a tire puncture near the end of the race, becoming the first man to win gold medals in both road cycling events at the same Olympics. The 273 kilometer course through the streets of Paris was the longest Olympic road race to date.

On September 22, almost 2 months after the conclusion of the Olympics, Evenepoel won the time trial at the World Championships in Zürich, finishing 6 seconds ahead of Ganna. His chain dropped before the start and he rode without a power meter. Evenepoel finished fifth in the road race. Evenepoel finished his 2024 season with a second-place finish at Il Lombardia.

On 3 December, Evenpoel collided with an open door of a postal vehicle during a training ride in Belgium. He suffered fractures to his ribs, shoulder blade and hand, as well as a dislocated collarbone and contusions to both lungs as a result of this. He underwent a successful operation the following day.

==== 2025 — World and European time trial champion ====
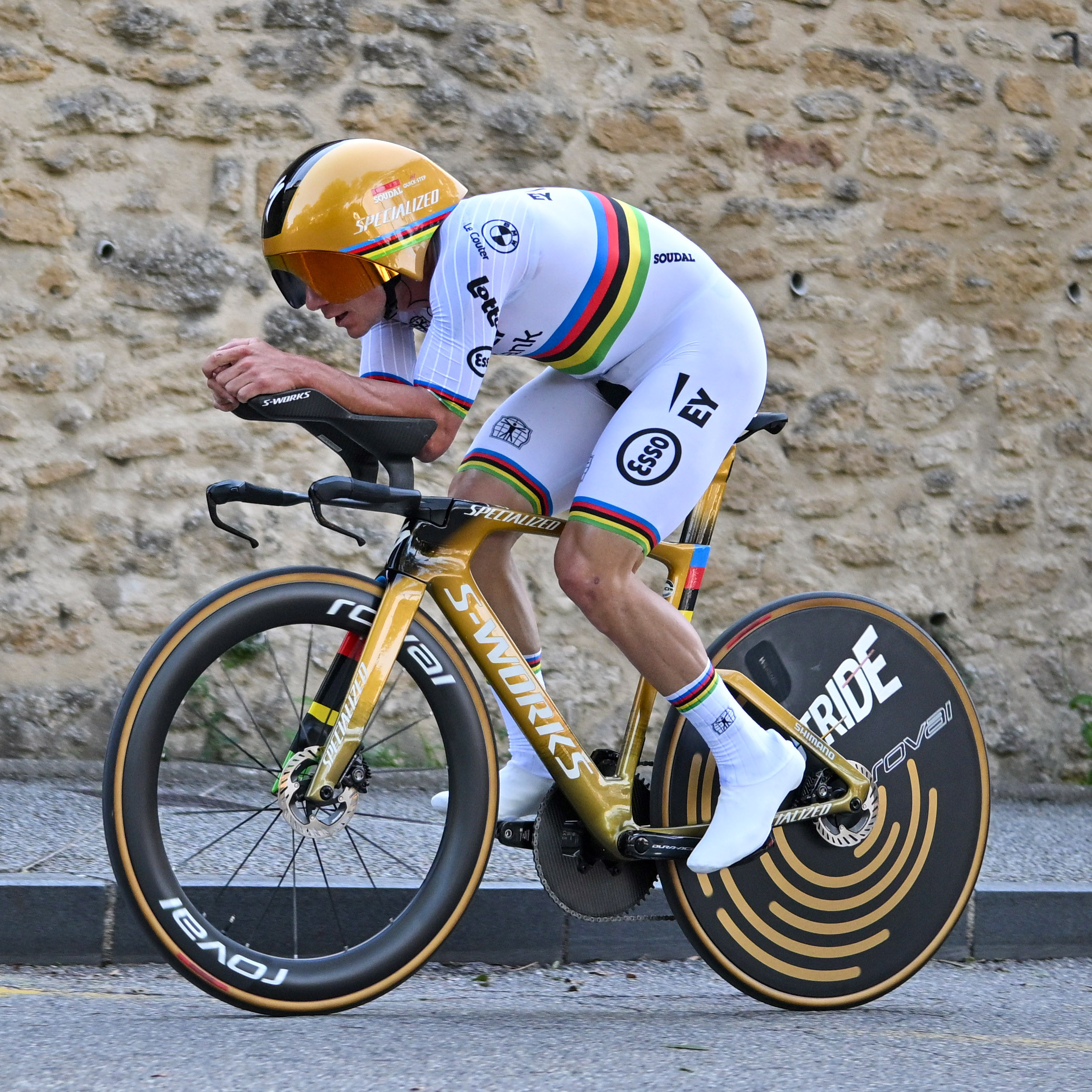
Evenepoel during the 2025 European Road Championships, where he won gold in the time trial

Evenepoel missed the early season while recovering from his injuries. He called the recovery process "the hardest battle of my life so far," particularly as it was the second shoulder injury he has suffered in the last nine months. Evenepoel returned in time to ride the Ardennes classics in April, hoping to recover peak performance in time for the Tour de France

In his first race back from injury, Evenepoel won the Brabantse Pijl in a two-up sprint against Wout van Aert. Evenepoel finished third in the Amstel Gold Race, despite a crash midway through, and came ninth in La Flèche Wallonne. Despite being listed by analysts as a pre-race favorite, Evenepoel finished a disappointing 59th at Liège–Bastogne–Liège, saying after the race "I can't expect miracles" and that it would take time to return to his best form.

At the Tour de Romandie, Evenepoel struggled in the high mountains but won the final stage 5 time trial by 11 seconds over João Almeida, finishing in fifth place overall. Evenepoel finished fourth overall at the Critérium du Dauphiné, again winning the lone time trial on stage 4. Next, he rode the Belgian championships, winning his second time trial by over a minute, before finishing runner-up to Tim Wellens in the road race.

In July, Evenepoel started at the Tour de France. He won the stage 5 time trial, moving into second overall behind Tadej Pogačar, but struggled as the race moved into the mountains. After a 12th-place finish on the stage 13 uphill time trial, which Evenepoel called "a really bad performance," he abandoned the next day. At the time, he was third overall and leading the young rider classification. After leaving the race, Evenepoel revealed he rode the Tour with a broken rib and sinusitis, a result of his crash at the Belgian championships. He called his abandonment "the hardest decision I've made in a long time"

In August, following months of speculation, Evenepoel announced he was signing a contract with Red Bull–Bora–Hansgrohe starting from the 2026 season. Evenepoel's existing team Soudal–Quick-Step agreed to release him from contract a year early, reportedly in exchange for $5 million compensation.

At the UCI Road World Championships in Kigali, Evenepoel won the elite time trial in a "dominant" performance, passing his rival Pogačar—who started two and a half minutes before—on the final climb over a distance of 40.6 km (25.23 mi). It was Evenepoel's third consecutive world title, joining Michael Rogers and Tony Martin as the only male cyclists to do so.

=== Red Bull–Bora–Hansgrohe ===
==== 2026 ====
Evenepoel started the 2026 season, his first with Red Bull–BORA–hansgrohe with a hat-trick of victories at Challenge Mallorca, winning the Trofeo Ses Salines team time trial with his team, before taking two more back-to-back individual victories at Trofeo Serra Tramuntana and Trofeo Andratx-Pollença. Team sports director Patxi Vila praised Evenepoel for having integrated into the team seamlessly.

During the 2026 Volta a la Comunitat Valenciana, between February 4 and February 8, Evenepoel finished first in the General Classification, his first stage race victory of the season, finishing 31 seconds up on his main rival, João Almeida. He won two stages during the race, stages 2 and 4.

On April 5, Evenepoel contested the 2026 Tour of Flanders, for the first time in his career. In a highly contested race, Evenepoel finished in 3rd, behind only Tadej Pogacar and Mathieu Van der Poel, distancing rivals Wout Van Aert and Mads Pedersen to finish on the podium.

On April 19, Evenepoel took his first classic win of the season at the 2026 Amstel Gold Race, finishing ahead of Mattias Skjelmose, the previous year's winner, in a sprint.

A week later, on April 26, Evenepoel lined up for the 2026 Liège–Bastogne–Liège. After Pogacar attacked on Cote de La Redoute, only Paul Seixas was able to stay with, as Evenepoel was unable to follow. Pogacar proceeded to drop Seixas on la Roche-Aux-Faucons, with Evenepoel finishing 3rd from the sprint behind.

At the 2026 Tour De France, Evenepoel won the mountain stage fifteen, and the individual time trial stage, stage sixteen, finishing second overall in the General Classification, his highest finish yet. Additionally, he finished in the Top 10 in 11 out of the Tour's 21 stages, and finished on the podium 5 times.

== Personal life ==
Evenepoel is the son of former professional cyclist Patrick Evenepoel, best known for winning the Grand Prix de Wallonie in 1993.

In 2022, Evenepoel married Oumaïma Rayane, who he met in high school. Following Evenepoel's December 2024 injury, he stated on social media that he drew strength from his wife's Islamic faith, saying "It's something that helps me go through life and it's something very, very beautiful."

Evenepoel is fluent in Dutch, French, and English.

== Career achievements ==
=== Major results ===
2017
1st La Philippe Gilbert Juniors
1st La Route des Géants
Aubel–Thimister–La Gleize

1st Points classification
1st Stage 2b

2018
UCI Junior Road World Championships

1st Road race
1st Time trial

UEC European Junior Road Championships

1st Road race
1st Time trial

National Junior Road Championships

1st Road race
1st Time trial

1st Overall Giro della Lunigiana

1st Points classification
1st Mountains classification
1st Stages 1a, 2 & 4

1st Overall Course de la Paix Juniors

1st Points classification
1st Mountains classification
1st Stages 2a (ITT) & 4

1st Overall GP Général Patton

1st Points classification
1st Mountains classification
1st Stages 1 & 2

1st Overall Aubel–Thimister–Stavelot

1st Points classification
1st Mountains classification
1st Stage 3

1st Overall Trophée Centre Morbihan

1st Points classification
1st Stage 1

1st Kuurne–Brussels–Kuurne Juniores
1st Chrono des Nations Juniores
1st Guido Reybrouck Classic
2019 (5 pro wins)
1st Time trial, UEC European Road Championships
1st Overall Tour of Belgium

1st Points classification
1st Stage 2

1st Clásica de San Sebastián
2nd Time trial, UCI Road World Championships
3rd Time trial, National Road Championships
4th Overall Tour of Turkey
8th Overall Adriatica Ionica Race

1st Stage 3

9th Overall Vuelta a San Juan

1st Young rider classification

2020 (9)
1st Overall Volta ao Algarve

1st Young rider classification
1st Stages 2 & 5 (ITT)

1st Overall Tour de Pologne

1st Stage 4

1st Overall Vuelta a Burgos

1st Young rider classification
1st Stage 3

1st Overall Vuelta a San Juan

1st Young rider classification
1st Stage 3 (ITT)

2021 (8)
1st Overall Danmark Rundt

1st Young rider classification
1st Stages 3 & 5 (ITT)

1st Overall Tour of Belgium

1st Stage 2 (ITT)

1st Brussels Cycling Classic
1st Coppa Bernocchi
1st Druivenkoers Overijse
UEC European Road Championships

2nd Road race
3rd Time trial

National Road Championships

2nd Time trial
3rd Road race

3rd Time trial, UCI Road World Championships
5th Giro dell'Emilia
5th Chrono des Nations
9th Time trial, Olympic Games
2022 (15)
UCI Road World Championships

1st Road race
3rd Time trial

1st Time trial, National Road Championships
1st Overall Vuelta a España

1st Young rider classification
1st Stages 10 (ITT) & 18

1st Overall Tour of Norway

1st Young rider classification
1st Stages 1, 3 & 5

1st Overall Volta ao Algarve

1st Young rider classification
1st Stage 4 (ITT)

1st Liège–Bastogne–Liège
1st Clásica de San Sebastián
1st Gullegem Koerse
1st Stage 8 (ITT) Tour de Suisse
2nd Overall Volta a la Comunitat Valenciana

1st Young rider classification
1st Stage 1

4th Overall Tour of the Basque Country

1st Young rider classification

6th Brabantse Pijl
2023 (13)
1st Time trial, UCI Road World Championships
National Road Championships

1st Road race
4th Time trial

1st Overall UAE Tour

1st Young rider classification
1st Stage 2 (TTT)

1st Liège–Bastogne–Liège
1st Clásica de San Sebastián
Vuelta a España

1st Mountains classification
1st Stages 3, 14 & 18
Held after Stages 3–5
Held after Stages 3–5 & 10–12
Combativity award Stages 14, 15, 17, 18 & Overall

Giro d'Italia

1st Stages 1 (ITT) & 9 (ITT)
Held & after Stages 1–3 & 9
Held after Stage 1

2nd Overall Volta a Catalunya

1st Mountains classification
1st Young rider classification
1st Stages 3 & 7

2nd Chrono des Nations
3rd Overall Tour de Suisse

1st Stage 7

7th Overall Vuelta a San Juan
9th Giro di Lombardia
2024 (9)
Olympic Games

1st Road race
1st Time trial

UCI Road World Championships

1st Time trial
5th Road race

1st Overall Volta ao Algarve

1st Stage 4 (ITT)

1st Figueira Champions Classic
2nd Overall Paris–Nice

1st Points classification
1st Mountains classification
1st Stage 8

2nd Giro di Lombardia
3rd Overall Tour de France

1st Young rider classification
1st Stage 7 (ITT)

7th Overall Critérium du Dauphiné

1st Stage 4 (ITT)

2025 (8)
UCI Road World Championships

1st Time trial
2nd Road race

UEC European Road Championships

1st Time trial
2nd Road race

National Road Championships

1st Time trial
2nd Road race

1st Brabantse Pijl
Tour de France

1st Stage 5 (ITT)
Held after Stages 5–9 & 12–13

2nd Overall Tour of Britain

1st Stage 5

2nd Giro di Lombardia
3rd Amstel Gold Race
4th Overall Critérium du Dauphiné

1st Stage 4 (ITT)

5th Overall Tour de Romandie

1st Stage 5 (ITT)

9th La Flèche Wallonne
2026 (14)
1st Time trial, UCI Road World Championships
1st Road race, UEC European Road Championships
1st Overall Volta a la Comunitat Valenciana

1st Stages 2 (ITT) & 4

1st Amstel Gold Race
1st Clásica de San Sebastián
1st Grand Prix Cycliste de Québec
1st Trofeo Serra Tramuntana
1st Trofeo Andratx–Pollença
1st Chrono des Nations
1st (TTT) Trofeo Ses Salines
2nd Overall Tour de France

1st Stages 15 & 16 (ITT)

3rd Tour of Flanders
3rd Liège–Bastogne–Liège
4th Giro di Lombardia
5th Overall Volta a Catalunya
5th Grand Prix Cycliste de Montréal
10th Overall UAE Tour

1st Stage 2 (ITT)

==== General classification results timeline ====
Grand Tour general classification results
Grand Tour	2019	2020	2021	2022	2023	2024	2025	2026
Giro d'Italia	—	—	DNF	—	DNF	—	—	—
Tour de France	—	—	—	—	—	3	DNF	2
Vuelta a España	—	—	—	1	12	—	—	—
Major stage race general classification results
Major stage race	2019	2020	2021	2022	2023	2024	2025	2026
Paris–Nice	—	—	—	—	—	2	—	—
Tirreno–Adriatico	—	—	—	11	—	—	—	—
Volta a Catalunya	—	NH	—	—	2	—	—	5
Tour of the Basque Country	—	NH	—	4	—	DNF	—	—
Tour de Romandie	76	NH	—	—	—	—	5	—
Critérium du Dauphiné	—	—	—	—	—	7	4	—
Tour de Suisse	—	NH	—	11	3	—	—	—

==== Classics results timeline ====
Monument	2019	2020	2021	2022	2023	2024	2025	2026
Milan–San Remo	—	—	—	—	—	—	—	—
Tour of Flanders	—	—	—	—	—	—	—	3
Paris–Roubaix	—	NH	—	—	—	—	—	—
Liège–Bastogne–Liège	—	—	—	1	1	—	59	3
Giro di Lombardia	—	DNF	19	—	9	2	2	4
Classic	2019	2020	2021	2022	2023	2024	2025	2026
Brabantse Pijl	—	—	—	6	—	—	1	—
Amstel Gold Race	—	NH	—	—	—	—	3	1
La Flèche Wallonne	—	—	—	43	—	—	9	—
Clásica de San Sebastián	1	NH	—	1	1	—	—	1
Brussels Cycling Classic	—	—	1	—	—	—	—	—
Grand Prix Cycliste de Québec	99	NH	NH	—	—	—	—	1
Grand Prix Cycliste de Montréal	53	NH	NH	—	—	—	—	5
Coppa Bernocchi	—	NH	1	—	—	53	—	—
Giro dell'Emilia	—	—	5	—	—	DNF	—	—

==== Major championships timeline ====
Event		2019	2020	2021	2022	2023	2024	2025	2026
Olympic Games	Time trial	Not held		9	Not held		1	Not held	
Olympic Games	Road race	Not held		49	Not held		1	Not held	
World Championships	Time trial	2	—	3	3	1	1	1	1
World Championships	Road race	DNF	—	62	1	25	5	2	12
European Championships	Time trial	1	—	3	—	—	—	1	—
European Championships	Road race	—	—	2	—	—	—	2	1
National Championships	Time trial	3	—	2	1	4	—	1	—
National Championships	Road race	84	—	3	37	1	—	2	—

=== Records ===
- Monument winner, Grand Tour winner and UCI World Champion in 1 year: 2022 (record shared with Alfredo Binda, Eddy Merckx, Bernard Hinault and Tadej Pogacar)
- Winner of the UCI Junior Road World Championship and the UCI Road World Championship: 2018 and 2022 (record shared with Greg LeMond and Mathieu van der Poel)
- Most Clásica de San Sebastián wins: 4
- Most Volta ao Algarve wins: 3 (record shared with Belmiro Silva)
- UCI World Champion in road race (2022) and time trial (2023): record shared with Abraham Olano
- Road race and time trial winner at the same edition of the Olympic Games (2024)
- UCI World Champion in road race (2022) and time trial (2023) and Olympic Champion in road race and time trial (2024)
- UEC European Champion in time trail (2019) and road race (2026)
- Most medals in Road World Championships (2026)
- First to win all possible championship jerseys in both junior and elite categorie, in both the road race and the time trial: national championship, UEC European Champion and UCI World Champion (2026)
- First to complete a double career Golden Grand Slam of championships: national championship, UEC European Champion, UCI World Champion and Olympic Champion, with all titles in both the road race and the time trial (2026)

=== Honours and awards ===
- Crystal Bicycle – Best Young Rider: 2018
- Belgian Promising Talent of the Year 2018
- Belgian Sportsman of the Year: 2019, 2022, 2023, 2024, 2025
- Crystal Bicycle – Best Professional Cyclist: 2019, 2022, 2023, 2024, 2025
- Flandrien of the Year: 2022, 2024, 2025
- Belgian National Sports Merit Award: 2022
- Vélo d'Or: 2022
- VeloNews Male Road Rider of the Year: 2022
- Vlaamse Reus: 2022
- Flemish Sportsjewel: 2022
- HLN/VTM Belgian of the Year: 2022, 2024

A statue on the Fóia mountain in Portugal was based on Evenepoel's victory in stage 2 of the 2020 Volta ao Algarve.
