= 2026 Clásica de San Sebastián =

2026 UCI World Tour, race 27 of 36

Race details
- Dates: 1 August 2026
- Stages: 1
- Distance: 221.2 km (137.4 mi)
- Winning time: 5h 23' 10"

Results
	Winner	Remco Evenepoel (BEL)	(Red Bull–Bora–Hansgrohe)
	Second	Richard Carapaz (ECU)	(EF Education–EasyPost)
	Third	Ben Tulett (GBR)	(Visma–Lease a Bike)

The 2026 Clásica de San Sebastián was a one-day road cycling race that took place on 1 August 2026 in San Sebastián, Spain. It was the 45th edition of the Clásica de San Sebastián and the 27th event of the 2026 UCI World Tour.

Remco Evenepoel won the race in a sprint à deux with Richard Carapaz, to take his fourth win in the race and the race outright record win.

== Teams ==
Twenty-five teams participated in the race, including 18 UCI WorldTeams and 7 UCI ProTeams.

UCI WorldTeams

- Alpecin–Premier Tech
- Team Bahrain Victorious
- Decathlon CMA CGM
- EF Education–EasyPost
- Groupama–FDJ United
- Lidl–Trek
- Lotto–Intermarché
- Movistar Team
- Netcompany INEOS
- NSN Cycling Team
- Red Bull–Bora–Hansgrohe
- Soudal–Quick-Step
- Team Jayco–AlUla
- Team Picnic–PostNL
- Visma–Lease a Bike
- UAE Team Emirates XRG
- Uno-X Mobility
- XDS Astana Team

UCI ProTeams

- Burgos Burpellet BH
- Caja Rural–Seguros RGA
- Cofidis
- Equipo Kern Pharma
- Euskaltel–Euskadi
- Pinarello–Q36.5 Pro Cycling Team
- Tudor Pro Cycling Team

== Result ==
Result
Rank	Rider	Team	Time
1	Remco Evenepoel (BEL)	Red Bull–Bora–Hansgrohe	5h 23' 10"
2	Richard Carapaz (ECU)	EF Education–EasyPost	+ 0"
3	Ben Tulett (GBR)	Visma–Lease a Bike	+ 29"
4	Christian Scaroni (ITA)	XDS Astana Team	+ 29"
5	Pello Bilbao (SPA)	Team Bahrain Victorious	+ 29"
6	Giulio Ciccone (ITA)	Lidl–Trek	+ 29"
7	Jan Christen (SWI)	UAE Team Emirates XRG	+ 29"
8	Marc Hirschi (SWI)	Tudor Pro Cycling Team	+ 29"
9	Marcel Camprubí (SPA)	Pinarello–Q36.5 Pro Cycling Team	+ 29"
10	Léo Bisiaux (FRA)	Decathlon CMA CGM	+ 29"
