= Daan Hoole =

Dutch cyclist (born 1999)

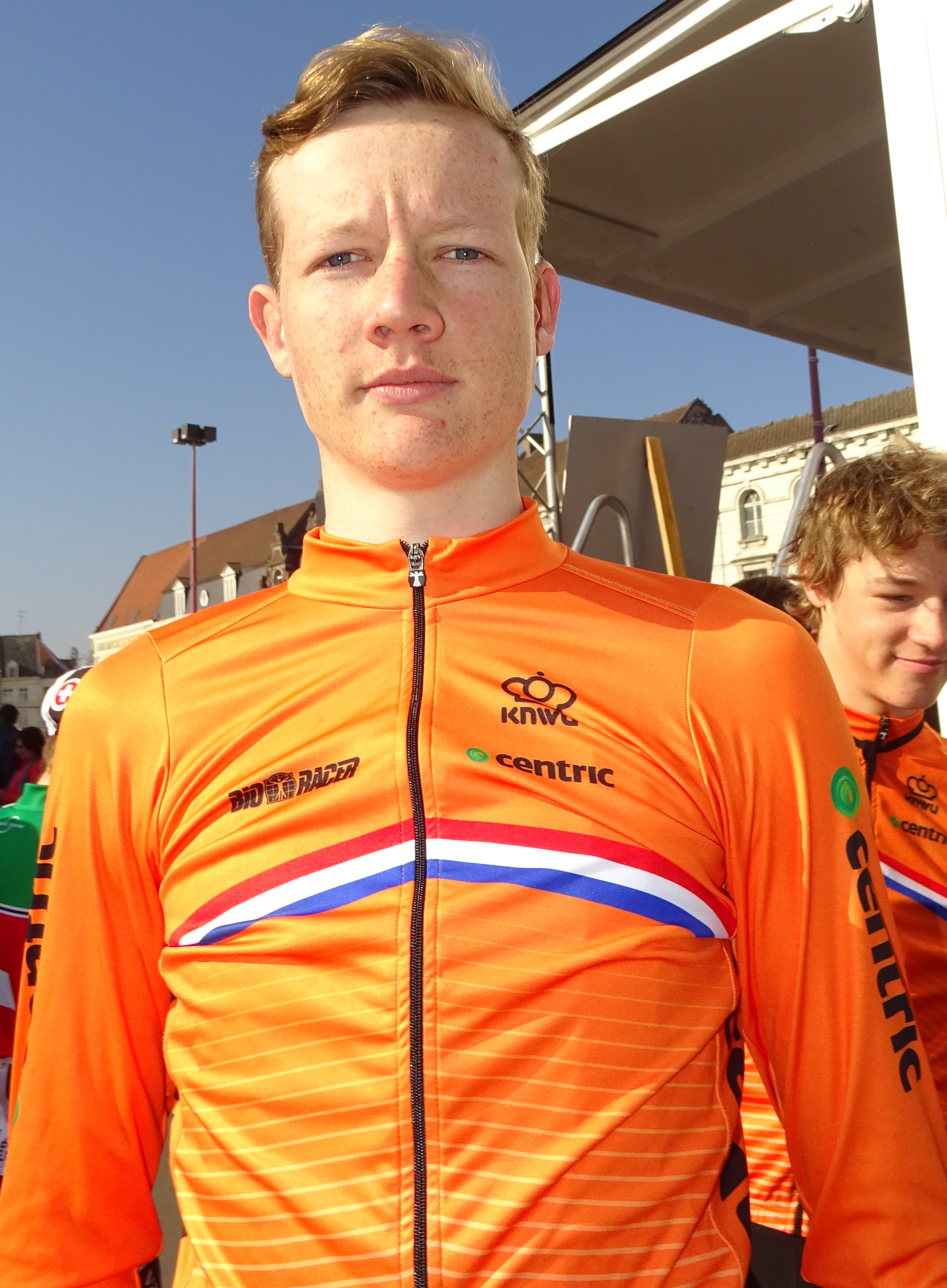
- Hoole at the 2017 Paris–Roubaix Juniors

Personal information
- Born: 22 February 1999 (age 27) Zuidland, Netherlands
- Height: 1.98 m (6 ft 6 in)
- Weight: 81 kg (179 lb)

Cycling career
- Sport: Cycling
- Current team: Decathlon CMA CGM
- Discipline: Road
- Role: Rider
- Rider type: Time trialist

Amateur team
- 2021: Trek–Segafredo (stagiaire)

Professional teams
- 2018–2021: SEG Racing Academy
- 2022–2025: Trek–Segafredo
- 2026–: Decathlon CMA CGM

Major wins
- Grand Tours Giro d’Italia 1 individual stage (2025) One-day races and Classics National Time Trial Championships (2024, 2025)
Medal record
Representing Netherlands
Men's road bicycle racing
European Championships
Bronze medal – third place	2021 Trentino	Under-23 time trial

Daan Hoole (born 22 February 1999) is a Dutch cyclist, who currently rides for UCI WorldTeam Decathlon CMA CGM, having previously raced for Lidl–Trek.

He signed for Decathlon CMA CGM ahead of the 2026 season.

== Major results ==
2016
2nd Overall Keizer der Juniores
3rd Overall Sint-Martinusprijs Kontich

1st Young rider classification
1st Stage 1 (TTT)

10th Overall La Coupe du Président de la Ville de Grudziądz
2017
2nd Paris–Roubaix Juniors
2nd Menen–Kemmel–Menen
3rd Time trial, National Junior Road Championships
3rd Overall Trofeo Karlsberg
3rd Nokere Koerse Juniores
3rd La route des Géants
4th Time trial, UEC European Junior Road Championships
7th Time trial, UCI Junior Road World Championships
8th Kuurne–Brussel–Kuurne Juniors
2018
3rd Time trial, National Under-23 Road Championships
3rd Omloop van het Waasland
2019
1st Time trial, National Under-23 Road Championships
5th Lillehammer GP
6th Time trial, UEC European Under-23 Road Championships
8th Ronde van Overijssel
9th Hafjell GP
10th Time trial, UCI Road World Under-23 Championships
2020
3rd Overall Orlen Nations Grand Prix

1st Stage 1 (TTT)

8th Time trial, UEC European Under-23 Road Championships
2021
1st Coppa della Pace
2nd Overall Flanders Tomorrow Tour
3rd Time trial, UEC European Under-23 Road Championships
5th Overall International Tour of Rhodes
6th Time trial, UCI Road World Under-23 Championships
8th Binche–Chimay–Binche
9th Overall Tour de l'Avenir

1st Stage 2 (TTT)

2022
National Road Championships

2nd Road race
3rd Time trial

2023
2nd Time trial, National Road Championships
7th Time trial, UEC European Road Championships
2024 (1 pro win)
1st Time trial, National Road Championships
4th Time trial, UEC European Road Championships
2025 (2)
1st Time trial, National Road Championships
1st Stage 10 (ITT) Giro d'Italia
1st Stage 1 (TTT) Volta a la Comunitat Valenciana
6th Time trial, UEC European Road Championships
9th Overall Tour of Holland
2026
4th Overall Tour of Britain
9th Time trial, UCI Road World Championships

=== Grand Tour general classification results timeline ===
Grand Tour	2022	2023	2024	2025
Giro d'Italia	—	109	132	119
Tour de France	—	—	—	—
Vuelta a España	DNF	—	—	149

Legend
—	Did not compete
DNF	Did not finish
