= 2024 Figueira Champions Classic =

2024 UCI ProSeries

Race details
- Dates: 11 February 2024
- Stages: 1
- Distance: 192.4 km (119.6 mi)
- Winning time: 4h 42' 25"

Results
	Winner	Remco Evenepoel (BEL)	(Soudal–Quick-Step)
	Second	Vito Braet (BEL)	(Intermarché–Wanty)
	Third	Simone Velasco (ITA)	(Astana Qazaqstan Team)

The 2024 Figueira Champions Classic was the 2nd edition of the Figueira Champions Classic single-day cycling race. It was held on 11 February 2024 over a distance of 192.4 km, starting and ending in Figueira da Foz.

The race was won by Remco Evenepoel of Soudal–Quick-Step in a 53-kilometer solo victory.

== Teams ==
Ten UCI WorldTeams, four UCI ProTeams, and nine UCI Continental teams made up the twenty-three teams that participated in the race.

UCI WorldTeams

- Alpecin–Deceuninck
- Arkéa–B&B Hotels
- Astana Qazaqstan Team
- EF Education–EasyPost
- Intermarché–Wanty
- Lidl–Trek
- Movistar Team
- Soudal–Quick-Step
- Team dsm–firmenich PostNL
- UAE Team Emirates

UCI ProTeams

- Caja Rural–Seguros RGA
- Equipo Kern Pharma
- Euskaltel–Euskadi
- Tudor Pro Cycling Team

UCI Continental teams

- ABTF Betão–Feirense
- AP Hotels & Resorts / Tavira / SC Farense
- Aviludo–Louletano–Loulé Concelho
- Credibom / LA Alumínios / Marcos Car
- Efapel Cycling
- GI Group Holding–Simoldes–UDO
- Rádio Popular–Paredes–Boavista
- Sabgal–Anicolor
- Tavfer–Ovos Matinados–Mortágua

== Results ==
Result
Rank	Rider	Team	Time
1	Remco Evenepoel (BEL)	Soudal–Quick-Step	4h 42' 25"
2	Vito Braet (BEL)	Intermarché–Wanty	+ 1' 48"
3	Simone Velasco (ITA)	Astana Qazaqstan Team	+ 1' 48"
4	Lars Boven (NED)	Alpecin–Deceuninck	+ 1' 48"
5	Marius Mayrhofer (GER)	Tudor Pro Cycling Team	+ 1' 48"
6	Marc Hirschi (SUI)	UAE Team Emirates	+ 1' 48"
7	Marijn van den Berg (NED)	EF Education–EasyPost	+ 1' 48"
8	Christian Scaroni (ITA)	Astana Qazaqstan Team	+ 1' 48"
9	Ruben Guerreiro (POR)	Movistar Team	+ 1' 48"
10	Pelayo Sánchez (ESP)	Movistar Team	+ 1' 48"
