= 2022 Liège–Bastogne–Liège =

Cycling race

2022 UCI World Tour, race 17 of 32

Race details
- Dates: 24 April 2022
- Stages: 1
- Distance: 257.2 km (159.8 mi)
- Winning time: 6h 12' 38"

Results
| | Winner | Remco Evenepoel (BEL) | (Quick-Step Alpha Vinyl Team) |
| | Second | Quinten Hermans (BEL) | (Intermarché–Wanty–Gobert Matériaux) |
| | Third | Wout van Aert (BEL) | (Team Jumbo–Visma) |

The 2022 Liège–Bastogne–Liège was a one-day Belgian road cycling race that took place on 24 April 2022 and was won by Remco Evenepoel. It was the 108th edition of Liège–Bastogne–Liège and the 17th event of the 2022 UCI World Tour.

== Teams ==
Twenty-five teams were invited to the race, including all nineteen UCI WorldTeams and six UCI ProTeams.

UCI WorldTeams

- AG2R Citroën Team
- Astana Qazaqstan Team
- Bora–Hansgrohe
- Cofidis
- Quick-Step Alpha Vinyl Team
- EF Education–EasyPost
- Groupama–FDJ
- INEOS Grenadiers
- Intermarché–Wanty–Gobert Matériaux
- Israel–Premier Tech
- Lotto–Soudal
- Movistar Team
- Team Bahrain Victorious
- Team BikeExchange–Jayco
- Team DSM
- Team Jumbo–Visma
- Trek–Segafredo
- UAE Team Emirates

UCI ProTeams

- Alpecin–Fenix
- Arkéa–Samsic
- Bardiani–CSF–Faizanè
- B&B Hotels–KTM
- Bingoal Pauwels Sauces WB
- Sport Vlaanderen–Baloise
- Team TotalEnergies

== Summary ==
2021 winner Tadej Pogačar pulled out of the race the day before due to a family emergency, with commentators & riders stating that the race would be much more open as a result. The 257.2 kilometres (159.8 mi) route from Liège to Liége was similar to that of recent years, with the key difference being the omission of Côte des Forges from the route following severe flooding in July 2021.

World champion Julian Alaphilippe and five other riders were injured in a large crash with around 60 km to go. With 30 km to go, Remco Evenepoel of Quick-Step Alpha Vinyl Team attacked on the Côte de La Redoute, and soloed the last 14 km to victory in Liège, winning by 48 seconds. The podium places were decided by a sprint finish, with Quinten Hermans beating Wout van Aert for second place.

== Result ==
Result
| Rank | Rider | Team | Time |
|---|---|---|---|
| 1 | Remco Evenepoel (BEL) | Quick-Step Alpha Vinyl Team | 6h 12' 38" |
| 2 | Quinten Hermans (BEL) | Intermarché–Wanty–Gobert Matériaux | + 48" |
| 3 | Wout van Aert (BEL) | Team Jumbo–Visma | + 48" |
| 4 | Daniel Martínez (COL) | INEOS Grenadiers | + 48" |
| 5 | Sergio Higuita (COL) | Bora–Hansgrohe | + 48" |
| 6 | Dylan Teuns (BEL) | Team Bahrain Victorious | + 48" |
| 7 | Alejandro Valverde (ESP) | Movistar Team | + 48" |
| 8 | Neilson Powless (USA) | EF Education–EasyPost | + 48" |
| 9 | Marc Hirschi (SWI) | UAE Team Emirates | + 48" |
| 10 | Michael Woods (CAN) | Israel–Premier Tech | + 48" |
