= 2025 UCI Road World Championships – Men's time trial =

Cycling event

Men's time trial
2025 UCI Road World Championships

Race details
- Dates: 21 September 2025
- Distance: 40.6 km (25.23 mi)
- Winning time: 49:46.03

Medalists
	Gold	(Belgium) Remco Evenepoel (BEL)
	Silver	(Australia) Jay Vine (AUS)
	Bronze	(Belgium) Ilan Van Wilder (BEL)

The Men's time trial of the 2025 UCI Road World Championships was a cycling event that took place on 21 September 2025 in Kigali, Rwanda. It was the 32nd edition of the championship, for which Remco Evenepoel of Belgium was the defending champion, having won in 2024.

== Final classification ==
Rank	Position in the time trial
Time	Time taken to complete the time trial
Diff	Deficit to the winner of the time trial
DNS	Denotes a rider who did not start
DNF	Denotes a rider who did not finish
DSQ	Denotes a rider who was disqualified from the race
OTL	Denotes a rider who finished outside the time limit

Rank	Rider	Country	Time	Diff.
1st place, gold medalist(s)	Remco Evenepoel	Belgium	49:46.03	
2nd place, silver medalist(s)	Jay Vine	Australia	51:00.83	+ 1:14.80
3rd place, bronze medalist(s)	Ilan Van Wilder	Belgium	52:22.10	+ 2:36.07
4	Tadej Pogačar	Slovenia	52:23.76	+ 2:37.73
5	Isaac del Toro	Mexico	52:26.89	+ 2:40.86
6	Andreas Leknessund	Norway	52:43.30	+ 2:57.27
7	Lucas Plapp	Australia	52:49.37	+ 3:03.34
8	Bruno Armirail	France	52:52.10	+ 3:06.07
9	Thymen Arensman	Netherlands	53:25.71	+ 3:39.68
10	Stefan Küng	Switzerland	53:34.95	+ 3:48.92
11	Iván Romeo	Spain	53:38.37	+ 3:52.34
12	Michael Leonard	Canada	53:39.14	+ 3:53.11
13	Matteo Sobrero	Italy	53:45.95	+ 3:59.92
14	Walter Vargas	Colombia	53:50.07	+ 4:04.04
15	Mattia Cattaneo	Italy	53:56.68	+ 4:10.65
16	Paul Seixas	France	54:00.17	+ 4:14.14
17	Miguel Heidemann	Germany	54:38.81	+ 4:52.78
18	Raúl García Pierna	Spain	54:49.36	+ 5:03.33
19	Florian Vermeersch	Belgium	54:49.59	+ 5:03.56
20	Byron Munton	South Africa	54:51.78	+ 5:05.75
21	Rein Taaramäe	Estonia	55:08.96	+ 5:22.93
22	Artem Nych	Individual Neutral Athletes	55:23.76	+ 5:37.73
23	Darren Rafferty	Ireland	55:43.58	+ 5:57.55
24	William Barta	United States	56:36.61	+ 6:50.58
25	Shemu Nsengiyumva	Rwanda	56:41.13	+ 6:55.10
26	Ryan Mullen	Ireland	56:53.95	+ 7:07.92
27	Brandon Downes	South Africa	57:09.27	+ 7:23.24
28	Laurent Gervais	Canada	57:23.86	+ 7:37.83
29	Mauro Schmid	Switzerland	57:25.10	+ 7:39.07
30	Su Haoyu	China	58:01.83	+ 8:15.80
31	Moise Mugisha	Rwanda	58:40.67	+ 8:54.64
32	Red Walters	Grenada	59:52.98	+ 10:06.95
33	Liu Jiankun	China	1:00:07.63	+ 10:21.60
34	Alexandre Mayer	Mauritius	1:02:22.20	+ 12:36.17
35	Majid Abu Harrah	Jordan	1:02:31.66	+ 12:45.63
36	Bizay Redae	Ethiopia	1:03:54.20	+ 14:08.17
37	Ahmad Badreddin Wais	Athlete Refugee Team	1:05:02.91	+ 15:16.88
38	Edwin Ndungu	Kenya	1:05:30.63	+ 15:44.60
39	Briton John	Guyana	1:05:32.40	+ 15:46.37
40	Boniphase Ngwata	Tanzania	1:05:48.87	+ 16:02.84
41	Aurélien de Comarmond	Mauritius	1:06:53.49	+ 17:07.46
42	Siriki Diarra	Mali	1:07:03.41	+ 17:17.38
43	Hassan Sharif	Tanzania	1:09:15.33	+ 19:29.30
44	Ricardo Sodjede	Benin	1:10:08.40	+ 20:22.37
45	Ahmet Örken	Turkey	1:10:08.52	+ 20:22.49
46	Victor Akpabli	Ghana	1:10:11.29	+ 20:25.26
47	Dino Mohamed Houlder	Madagascar	1:10:38.31	+ 20:52.28
48	Ibrahim Jalloh	Sierra Leone	1:11:46.73	+ 22:00.70
49	Abderemane Dahalani	Comoros	1:12:16.99	+ 20:25.26
50	Chiekhouna Cissé	Senegal	1:12:43.77	+ 22:57.74
51	Djandouba Diallo	Mali	1:15:16.02	+ 25:29.99
52	Apolinario Ca	Guinea-Bissau	1:21:08.31	+ 31:22.28
53	Dictor Mut	South Sudan	1:32:03.11	+ 42:17.08
54	Jalal Edward	South Sudan	1:33:05.01	+ 43:18.98
	Mustapha Koroma	Sierra Leone	DNS	
