= Bruno Armirail =

French bicycle racer

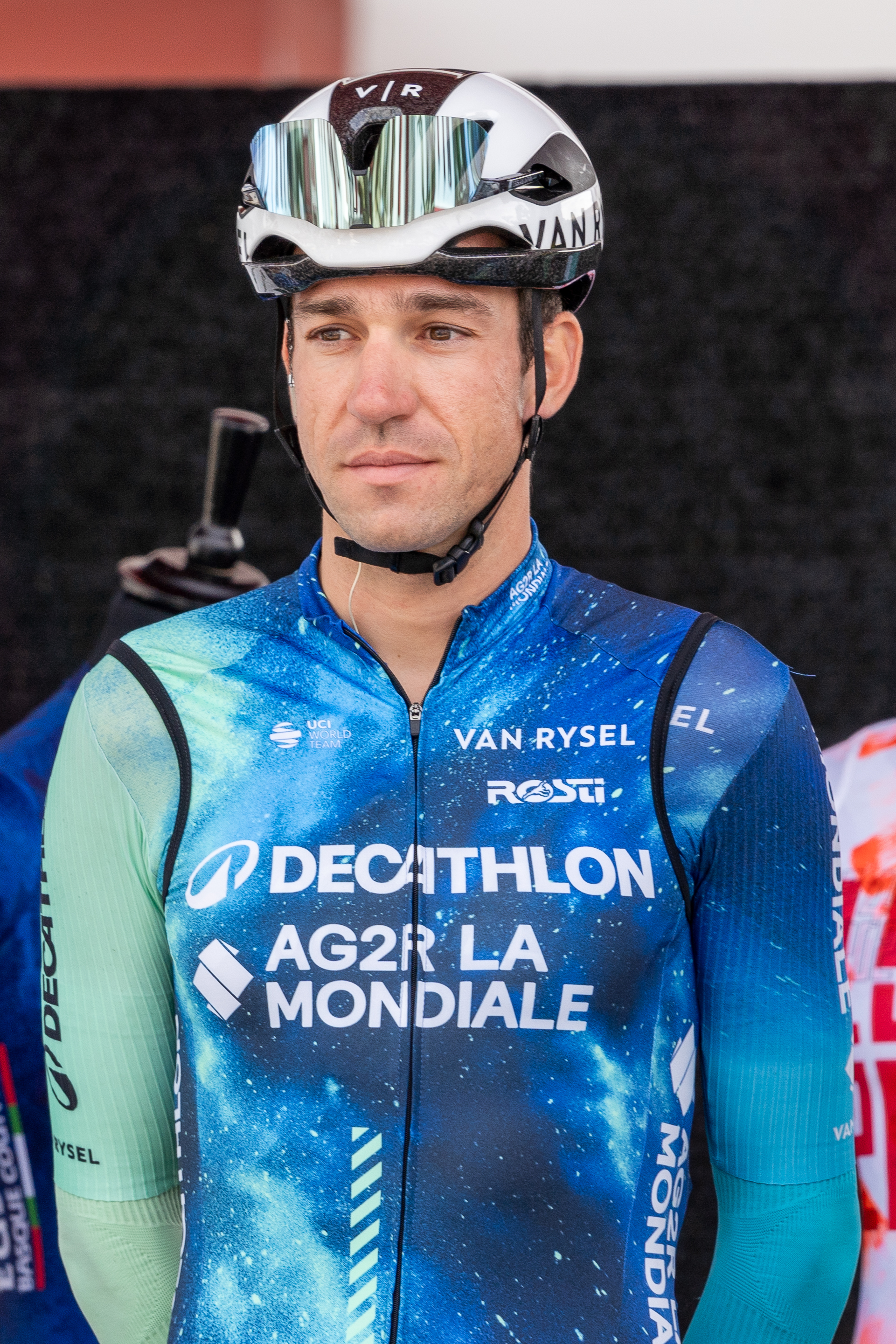
- Armirail in 2024

Personal information
- Born: 11 April 1994 (age 32) Tarbes, France
- Height: 1.90 m (6 ft 3 in)
- Weight: 71 kg (157 lb)

Cycling career
- Sport: Cycling
- Current team: Visma–Lease a Bike
- Discipline: Road
- Role: Rider
- Rider type: Rouleur; Climber; Time trialist

Amateur teams
- 2013: AC Bagnères-de-Bigorre
- 2014: Armée de Terre
- 2017: Occitane CF

Professional teams
- 2015–2016: Armée de Terre
- 2017: FDJ (stagiaire)
- 2018–2023: FDJ
- 2024–2025: Decathlon–AG2R La Mondiale
- 2026–: Visma–Lease a Bike

Major wins
- Grand Tours Tour de France 1 TTT stage (2026) One-day races and Classics National Time Trial Championships (2022, 2024, 2025)
Medal record
Men's road bicycle racing
Representing France
World Championships
| Silver medal – second place | 2023 Glasgow | Mixed team relay |
| Silver medal – second place | 2025 Kigali | Mixed team relay |
European Championships
| Gold medal – first place | 2023 Drenthe | Mixed team relay |
| Gold medal – first place | 2025 Guilherand-Granges | Mixed team relay |
| Gold medal – first place | 2026 Ljubljana | Mixed team relay |
| Silver medal – second place | 2026 Ljubljana | Time trial |

Bruno Armirail (born 11 April 1994) is a French cyclist, who currently rides for UCI WorldTeam Visma–Lease a Bike. He is a triple national time trial champion, winning the French National Time Trial Championships in 2022, 2024 and again in 2025.

== Major results ==
2013
2nd Time trial, National Under-23 Road Championships
2nd Chrono des Nations U23
2nd Biran Grand Prix
2014
1st Time trial, National Under-23 Road Championships
2nd Tour de Basse-Navarre
3rd Circuit de l'Essor
3rd Boucle de l'Artois
3rd Overall Tour d'Eure-et-Loir
2017
1st Mountains classification, Tour de Gironde
3rd Jeux de la Francophonie
6th Overall Tour du Poitou-Charentes
2018
3rd Duo Normand (with Jeremy Roy)
2020
3rd Time trial, National Road Championships
2021
2nd Time trial, National Road Championships
2nd Overall Tour Poitou-Charentes en Nouvelle-Aquitaine
3rd Mercan'Tour Classic Alpes-Maritimes
2022 (1 pro win)
1st Time trial, National Road Championships
5th Chrono des Nations
10th Overall Tour de Pologne
10th Time trial, UCI Road World Championships
2023 (1)
1st Team relay, UEC European Road Championships
2nd Overall Tour Poitou-Charentes en Nouvelle-Aquitaine

1st Stage 3b

2nd Team relay, UCI Road World Championships
2nd Time trial, National Road Championships
9th Overall Okolo Slovenska
Giro d'Italia

Held after Stages 14–15

2024 (1)
1st Time trial, National Road Championships
2025 (1)
1st Time trial, National Road Championships
1st Mountains classification, Critérium du Dauphiné
1st Mountains classification, Tour of the Basque Country
UCI Road World Championships

2nd Team relay
8th Time trial

9th Time trial, UEC European Road Championships
Tour de France

Combativity award Stages 2 & 12

2026
1st Stage 1 (TTT) Tour de France
1st Stage 3 (TTT) Tour Auvergne-Rhône-Alpes
2nd Team relay, UCI Road World Championships
2nd Time trial, UEC European Road Championships
2nd Time trial, National Road Championships

=== Grand Tour general classification results timeline ===
| Grand Tour | 2019 | 2020 | 2021 | 2022 | 2023 | 2024 | 2025 |
|---|---|---|---|---|---|---|---|
| Giro d'Italia | — | — | — | — | 16 | — | — |
| Tour de France | — | — | 83 | — | — | 33 | 50 |
| Vuelta a España | 91 | 28 | — | DNF | — | — | 19 |

Legend
| — | Did not compete |
| DNF | Did not finish |
