= 2020 UEC European Track Championships – Men's 1 km time trial =

Men's 1 km time trial at the 2020 UEC European Track Championships
- Venue: Kolodruma, Plovdiv
- Date: 15 November
- Competitors: 19 from 12 nations
- Winning time: 1:00.517

Medalists
gold medal	Tomáš Bábek	Czech Republic
silver medal	Ethan Vernon	Great Britain
bronze medal	Jonathan Milan	Italy

The men's 1 km time trial competition at the 2020 UEC European Track Championships was held on 15 November 2020.

== Results ==
=== Qualifying ===
The top 8 riders qualified for the final.

Rank	Name	Nation	Time	Behind	Notes
1	Tomáš Bábek	Czech Republic	1:00.673		Q
2	Jonathan Milan	Italy	1:00.829	+0.156	Q
3	Ethan Vernon	Great Britain	1:01.041	+0.367	Q
4	Aleksandr Dubchenko	Russia	1:01.190	+0.517	Q
5	Juan Peralta	Spain	1:01.198	+0.525	Q
6	Jakub Šťastný	Czech Republic	1:01.261	+0.588	Q
7	Alexander Sharapov	Russia	1:01.361	+0.688	Q
8	Sotirios Bretas	Greece	1:01.693	+1.020	Q
9	José Moreno Sánchez	Spain	1:01.695	+1.021	
10	Norbert Szabo	Romania	1:02.093	+1.420	
11	Miroslav Minchev	Bulgaria	1:03.267	+2.594	
12	Dominik Bieler	Switzerland	1:03.965	+3.292	
13	Gidas Umbri	Italy	1:04.028	+3.355	
14	Vladyslav Denysenko	Ukraine	1:04.545	+3.872	
15	Ioannis Kalogeropoulos	Greece	1:04.668	+3.995	
16	Mikhail Shemetau	Belarus	1:04.842	+4.169	
17	Maksym Vasilyev	Ukraine	1:05.107	+4.434	
18	Bálint Csengői	Hungary	1:05.816	+5.143	
19	Georgi Lumparov	Bulgaria	1:06.863	+6.189	

=== Final ===
Rank	Name	Nation	Time	Behind	Notes
1st place, gold medalist(s)	Tomáš Bábek	Czech Republic	1:00.517		
2nd place, silver medalist(s)	Ethan Vernon	Great Britain	1:00.999	+0.482	
3rd place, bronze medalist(s)	Jonathan Milan	Italy	1:01.009	+0.492	
4	Aleksandr Dubchenko	Russia	1:01.084	+0.567	
5	Alexander Sharapov	Russia	1:01.359	+0.842	
6	Jakub Šťastný	Czech Republic	1:01.614	+1.097	
7	Juan Peralta	Spain	1:01.616	+1.099	
8	Sotirios Bretas	Greece	1:01.964	+1.447	
