= 2020 UEC European Track Championships – Men's madison =

Men's madison at the 2020 UEC European Track Championships
- Venue: Kolodruma, Plovdiv
- Date: 15 November
- Competitors: 24 from 12 nations
- Winning points: 51

Medalists
gold medal	Sebastián Mora; Albert Torres	Spain
silver medal	Ivo Oliveira; Rui Oliveira	Portugal
bronze medal	Francesco Lamon; Stefano Moro	Italy

The men's madison cycling competition at the 2020 UEC European Track Championships was held on 15 November 2020, in Plovdiv, Bulgaria.

== Results ==
200 laps (50 km) with 20 sprints were raced.

Rank	Name	Nation	Lap points	Sprint points	Finish order	Total points
1st place, gold medalist(s)	Sebastián Mora; Albert Torres	Spain	0	51	3	51
2nd place, silver medalist(s)	Ivo Oliveira; Rui Oliveira	Portugal	20	23	6	43
3rd place, bronze medalist(s)	Francesco Lamon; Stefano Moro	Italy	0	33	8	33
4	Lev Gonov; Nikita Bersenev	Russia	0	30	2	30
5	Raman Tsishkou; Yauheni Karaliok	Belarus	0	12	4	12
6	Tristan Marguet; Lukas Rüegg	Switzerland	0	12	5	12
7	Andreas Graf; Stefan Matzner	Austria	0	7	7	7
8	Denis Rugovac; Daniel Babor	Czech Republic	–20	25	1	5
9	Wojciech Pszczolarski; Daniel Staniszewski	Poland	–20	2	9	–18
10	Vitaliy Hryniv; Roman Gladysh	Ukraine	–40	3	10	–37
11	Matthew Walls; Oliver Wood	Great Britain	–40	34	–	DNF
12	Žiga Jerman; Tilen Finkšt	Slovenia	–60	0	–	DNF
	Christos Volikakis; Zafeiris Volikakis	Greece	Did not start			
	Itamar Einhorn; Rotem Tene	Israel	Did not start			
