= 2020 UEC European Track Championships – Men's points race =

Men's points race at the 2020 UEC European Track Championships
- Venue: Kolodruma, Plovdiv
- Date: 14 November
- Competitors: 19 from 19 nations
- Winning points: 51

Medalists
gold medal	Sebastián Mora	Spain
silver medal	Matteo Donegà	Italy
bronze medal	Daniel Crista	Romania

The men's points race competition at the 2020 UEC European Track Championships will be held on 14 November 2020.

== Results ==
160 laps (40 km) were raced with 16 sprints.

Rank	Name	Nation	Lap points	Sprint points	Finish order	Total points
1st place, gold medalist(s)	Sebastián Mora	Spain	20	31	6	51
2nd place, silver medalist(s)	Matteo Donegà	Italy	20	22	11	42
3rd place, bronze medalist(s)	Daniel Crista	Romania	20	20	1	40
4	Raman Ramanau	Belarus	20	17	4	37
5	Ethan Vernon	Great Britain	0	18	3	18
6	Wojciech Pszczolarski	Poland	0	18	9	18
7	Andreas Graf	Austria	0	17	10	17
8	Nikita Bersenev	Russia	0	15	7	15
9	Simon Vitzthum	Switzerland	0	12	5	12
10	Krisztián Lovassy	Hungary	0	9	2	9
11	Nicolas Pietrula	Czech Republic	–20	0	12	–20
12	Mantas Bitinas	Lithuania	–60	2	8	–58
	Rui Oliveira	Portugal	0	1	–	DNF
	Tilen Finkšt	Slovenia	–20	0	–	DNF
	Volodymyr Dzhus	Ukraine	–40	5	–	DNF
	Lukáš Kubiš	Slovakia	–40	0	–	DNF
	Zafeiris Volikakis	Greece	–40	0	–	DNF
	Martin Popov	Bulgaria	–60	0	–	DNF
	Vitālijs Korņilovs	Latvia	–80	0	–	DNF
