= List of Belarusian records in track cycling =

The following are the national records in track cycling in Belarus maintained by the Belarusian Federation of Cycling Sport.

== Men ==
Event	Record	Athlete	Date	Meet	Place	Ref
Flying 200 m time trial	9.799	Aliaksandr Hlova	3 February 2026	European Championships	Konya, Turkey	
250 m time trial (standing start)	17.685	Uladzislau Novik	11 November 2016	World Cup	Apeldoorn, Netherlands	
Team sprint	44.149	Yauhen Veramchuk; Artsiom Zaitsau; Uladzislau Novik	20 January 2018	World Cup	Minsk, Belarus	
1 km time trial	59.613	Artsiom Zaitsau	2 February 2026	European Championships	Konya, Turkey	
1 km time trial (sea level)	1:00.565	Artsiom Zaitsau	27 February 2024	Belarusian Open Championships	Minsk, Belarus	
4000m individual pursuit	4.11.044	Yauheni Karaliok	27 February 2024	Belarusian Open Championships	Minsk, Belarus	
4000m team pursuit	3:57.899	Raman Tsishkou; Yauheni Akhramenka; Yauheni Karaliok; Hardzei Tsishchanka	28 June 2019	European Games	Minsk, Belarus	

== Women ==
Event	Record	Athlete	Date	Meet	Place	Ref
Flying 200 m time trial	10.793	Olga Panarina	5 November 2011	World Cup	Astana, Kazakhstan	
250 m time trial (standing start)	21.174	Hanna Tserakh	4 February 2026	European Championships	Konya, Turkey	
500 m time trial	33.138	Olga Panarina	4 October 2011	Belarusian Cup	Minsk, Belarus	
1 km time trial	1:06.639	Hanna Tserakh	4 February 2026	European Championships	Konya, Turkey	
3000m individual pursuit	3:25.326	Hanna Tserakh	18 January 2025	Russian Cup	Saint Petersburg, Russia	
4000m individual pursuit	4:36.915	Palina Konrad	4 February 2026	European Championships	Konya, Turkey	
3000m team pursuit	3:20.245	Tatsiana Sharakova; Alena Dylko; Aksana Papko	4 August 2012	Olympic Games	London, Great Britain	
4000m team pursuit	4:19.752	Karalina Biryuk; Iryna Chuyankova; Hanna Tserakh; Nastassia Kiptsikava	20 July 2023	Russian Cycling Federation Cup	Saint Petersburg, Russia	
