= List of Russian records in track cycling =

The following are the national records in track cycling in Russia maintained by Russia's national cycling federation: Russian Cycling Federation.

== Men ==
Key to tables: Record not kept by federation

Event	Record	Athlete	Date	Meet	Place	Ref
Flying 200m time trial	9.099	Mikhail Iakovlev	22 May 2022	Grand Prix of Moscow	Moscow, Russia	
250m time trial (standing start)	17.193	Pavel Yakushevskiy	19 October 2017	European Championships	Berlin, Germany	
Flying 500m time trial	24.819	Danila Burlakov	28 October 2025		Moscow, Russia	
1km time trial	59.672	Alexander Sharapov	5 April 2022		Saint Petersburg, Russia	
1km time trial (sea level)	59.672	Alexander Sharapov	5 April 2022		Saint Petersburg, Russia	
Team sprint	42.623	Nikita Afanasev; Danila Burlakov; Nikita Kalachnik	21 September 2025	Russian Championships	Saint Petersburg, Russia	
4000m individual pursuit	4:02.281	Lev Gonov	3 February 2026	European Championships	Konya, Turkey	
4000m team pursuit	3:47.315	Nikita Bersenev; Ivan Smirnov; Lev Gonov; Gleb Syritsa	30 October 2020	Russian Championships	Saint Petersburg, Russia	

== Women ==
Event	Record	Athlete	Date	Meet	Place	Ref
Flying 200m time trial	10.159	Alina Lysenko	24 October 2024	Russian Cup	Moscow, Russia	
Flying 200m time trial	10.092	Alina Lysenko	2 February 2026	European Championships	Konya, Turkey	
250m time trial (standing start)	18.304	Anastasia Voynova	19 October 2017	European Championships	Berlin, Germany	
Flying 500m time trial	26.750	Alina Lysenko	25 October 2024	Russian Cup	Moscow, Russia	
500m time trial	32.483	Yana Burlakova	29 January 2025	Russian Championships	Saint Petersburg, Russia	
500m time trial (sea level)	32.483	Yana Burlakova	29 January 2025	Russian Championships	Saint Petersburg, Russia	
Flying 1km time trial	1:05.232	Erika Salumäe	27 May 1987		Moscow, Russia	
1 km time trial	1:03.621	Yana Burlakova	4 February 2026	European Championships	Konya, Turkey	
Team sprint (500 m)	32.249	Daria Shmeleva; Anastasia Voynova	2 August 2021	Olympic Games	Izu, Japan	
Team sprint (750 m)	46.094	Natalia Antonova; Daria Shmeleva; Yana Burlakova	21 September 2025	Russian Championships	St. Petersburg, Russia	
3000m individual pursuit	3:26.205	Angelina Novolodskaya	14 June 2026		Saint Petersburg, Russia	
4000m individual pursuit	4:37.323	Valeria Valgonen	5 June 2026	Grand Prix of St. Petersburg	Saint Petersburg, Russia	
3000m team pursuit	3:22.086	Venera Absalyamova; Victoria Kondel; Evgenia Romanyuta	4 November 2011	World Cup	Astana, Kazakhstan	
4000m team pursuit	4:13.711	Aglaya Kokareva; Valeria Valgonen; Polina Danshina; Angelina Novolodskaya	2 July 2025	Russian Championships	Saint Petersburg, Russia	
