= Cycling at the 2019 European Games – Men's individual pursuit =

Men's individual pursuit at the 2019 European Games
- Venue: Minsk Velodrome
- Date: 29 June
- Competitors: 11 from 8 nations
- Winning time: 4:14.675

Medalists
gold medal	Ivan Smirnov	Russia
silver medal	Davide Plebani	Italy
bronze medal	Claudio Imhof	Switzerland

The men's individual pursuit competition at the 2019 European Games was held at the Minsk Velodrome on 29 June 2019.

== Results ==
=== Qualifying ===
The first two riders raced for gold, the third and fourth fastest rider raced for the bronze medal.

Rank	Name	Nation	Time	Behind	Notes
1	Ivan Smirnov	Russia	4:15.119		QG
2	Davide Plebani	Italy	4:16.655	+1.536	QG
3	Szymon Krawczyk	Poland	4:17.894	+2.775	QB
4	Claudio Imhof	Switzerland	4:18.391	+3.272	QB
5	Mikhail Shemetau	Belarus	4:19.955	+4.836	
6	Yauheni Akhramenka	Belarus	4:21.652	+6.533	
7	João Matias	Portugal	4:23.606	+8.487	
8	Carloalberto Giordani	Italy	4:25.079	+9.960	
9	Volodymyr Dzhus	Ukraine	4:30.521	+15.402	
10	Gerben Thijssen	Belgium	4:33.117	+17.998	
11	Oleh Kanaka	Ukraine	4:35.520	+20.401	

=== Finals ===
Rank	Name	Nation	Time	Behind
Gold medal race
1st place, gold medalist(s)	Ivan Smirnov	Russia	4:14.675	
2nd place, silver medalist(s)	Davide Plebani	Italy	4:18.102	+3.427
Bronze medal race
3rd place, bronze medalist(s)	Claudio Imhof	Switzerland	4:15.768	
4	Szymon Krawczyk	Poland	4:19.220	+3.452
