= 2020 UEC European Track Championships – Men's team pursuit =

Men's team pursuit at the 2020 UEC European Track Championships
- Venue: Kolodruma, Plovdiv
- Date: 11–12 November
- Competitors: 26 from 6 nations
- Winning time: 3:54.677

Medalists
gold medal	Alexander Dubchenko; Lev Gonov; Nikita Bersenev; Alexander Evtushenko	Russia
silver medal	Francesco Lamon; Stefano Moro; Jonathan Milan; Gidas Umbri	Italy
bronze medal	Claudio Imhof; Simon Vitzthum; Lukas Rüegg; Dominik Bieler	Switzerland

The men's team pursuit competition at the 2020 UEC European Track Championships was held on 11 and 12 November 2020.

== Results ==
=== Qualifying ===
All teams advanced to the first round.

Rank	Name	Nation	Time	Behind	Notes
1	Alexander Dubchenko; Lev Gonov; Nikita Bersenev; Alexander Evtushenko	Russia	3:55.677		
2	Francesco Lamon; Stefano Moro; Jonathan Milan; Gidas Umbri	Italy	3:56.787	+1.110	
3	Claudio Imhof; Simon Vitzthum; Lukas Rüegg; Dominik Bieler	Switzerland	3:57.881	+2.204	
4	Mikhail Shemetau; Raman Tsishkou; Yauheni Karaliok; Dzianis Mazur	Belarus	4:00.902	+5.225	
5	Maksym Vasyliev; Volodymyr Dzhus; Vitaliy Hryniv; Roman Gladysh	Ukraine	4:04.057	+8.380	
6	José Moreno Sánchez; Óscar Pelegrí; Erik Martorell; Javier Serrano	Spain	4:06.444	+10.767	

=== First round ===
First round heats were held as follows:
Heat 1: 5th v 6th fastest
Heat 2: 2nd v 3rd fastest
Heat 3: 1st v 4th fastest

The winners of heats 2 and 3 proceeded to the gold medal race. The remaining four teams were ranked on time, from which the top two proceeded to the bronze medal race.

Rank	Heat	Name	Nation	Time	Notes
1	3	Alexander Dubchenko; Lev Gonov; Nikita Bersenev; Alexander Evtushenko	Russia		QG
2	2	Francesco Lamon; Stefano Moro; Jonathan Milan; Gidas Umbri	Italy	3:56.569	QG
3	2	Claudio Imhof; Simon Vitzthum; Lukas Rüegg; Dominik Bieler	Switzerland	3:57.591	QB
4	3	Mikhail Shemetau; Raman Tsishkou; Yauheni Karaliok; Dzianis Mazur	Belarus	3:59.079	QB
5	1	Maksym Vasyliev; Volodymyr Dzhus; Vitaliy Hryniv; Illia Klepikov	Ukraine	4:04.540	
6	1	José Moreno Sánchez; Jaime Romero; Erik Martorell; Javier Serrano	Spain	4:15.873	

=== Finals ===
Rank	Name	Nation	Time	Behind	Notes
Gold medal final
1st place, gold medalist(s)	Alexander Dubchenko; Lev Gonov; Nikita Bersenev; Alexander Evtushenko	Russia	3:54.677		
2nd place, silver medalist(s)	Francesco Lamon; Stefano Moro; Jonathan Milan; Gidas Umbri	Italy	3:54.787	+0.110	
Bronze medal final
3rd place, bronze medalist(s)	Claudio Imhof; Simon Vitzthum; Lukas Rüegg; Dominik Bieler	Switzerland	3:55.051		
4	Mikhail Shemetau; Raman Tsishkou; Yauheni Karaliok; Dzianis Mazur	Belarus	4:00.372	+5.321	
