= Cycling at the 2019 European Games – Men's team pursuit =

Men's team pursuit at the 2019 European Games
- Venue: Minsk Velodrome
- Dates: 27–28 June
- Competitors: 31 from 7 nations

Medalists
gold medal	Gleb Syritsa; Nikita Bersenev; Lev Gonov; Ivan Smirnov	Russia
silver medal	Francesco Lamon; Carloalberto Giordani; Davide Plebani; Liam Bertazzo; Stefano Moro	Italy
bronze medal	Théry Schir; Robin Froidevaux; Lukas Rüegg; Claudio Imhof; Nico Selenati	Switzerland

The men's cycling team pursuit at the 2019 European Games was held at the Minsk Velodrome on 27 and 28 June 2019.

== Results ==
=== Qualifying ===
Rank	Nation	Time	Behind	Notes
1	Russia; Gleb Syritsa; Nikita Bersenev; Lev Gonov; Ivan Smirnov	3:55.201		Q
2	Italy; Francesco Lamon; Stefano Moro; Davide Plebani; Liam Bertazzo	3:58.504	+3.303	Q
3	Belarus; Raman Tsishkou; Yauheni Akhramenka; Yauheni Karaliok; Hardzei Tsishchanka	3:59.048	+3.847	Q
4	Switzerland; Théry Schir; Robin Froidevaux; Lukas Rüegg; Nico Selenati	3:59.286	+4.085	Q
5	Poland; Daniel Staniszewski; Szymon Krawczyk; Filip Prokopyszyn; Damian Sławek	4:02.061	+6.860	q
6	Ukraine; Roman Gladysh; Volodymyr Dzhus; Vitaliy Hryniv; Vladyslav Shcherban	4:04.723	+9.522	q
7	Belgium; Fabio Van den Bossche; Moreno De Pauw; Jules Hesters; Gerben Thijssen	4:04.974	+9.773	q

=== First round ===
First round heats were held as follows:
Heat 1: 7th fastest alone
Heat 2: 5th v 6th fastest
Heat 3: 2nd v 3rd fastest
Heat 4: 1st v 4th fastest

The winners of heats 3 and 4 proceeded to the gold medal race. The remaining five teams were ranked on time, from which the top two proceeded to the bronze medal race.

Heat	Rank	Nation	Time	Notes
1	1	Belgium; Fabio Van den Bossche; Moreno De Pauw; Tuur Dens; Gerben Thijssen	4:05.118	
2	1	Poland; Daniel Staniszewski; Szymon Krawczyk; Filip Prokopyszyn; Damian Sławek	4:00.009	
2	2	Ukraine; Roman Gladysh; Volodymyr Dzhus; Vitaliy Hryniv; Vladyslav Shcherban	4:04.504	
3	1	Italy; Francesco Lamon; Stefano Moro; Davide Plebani; Liam Bertazzo	3:56.408	QG
3	2	Belarus; Raman Tsishkou; Yauheni Akhramenka; Yauheni Karaliok; Hardzei Tsishchanka	3:57.899	QB
4	1	Russia; Gleb Syritsa; Nikita Bersenev; Lev Gonov; Ivan Smirnov	3:53.104	QG
4	2	Switzerland; Théry Schir; Robin Froidevaux; Lukas Rüegg; Claudio Imhof	3:56.688	QB

=== Finals ===
Rank	Nation	Time	Behind	Notes
Gold medal final
1st place, gold medalist(s)	Russia; Gleb Syritsa; Nikita Bersenev; Lev Gonov; Ivan Smirnov			
2nd place, silver medalist(s)	Italy; Francesco Lamon; Carloalberto Giordani; Davide Plebani; Liam Bertazzo	OVL		
Bronze medal final
3rd place, bronze medalist(s)	Switzerland; Théry Schir; Robin Froidevaux; Lukas Rüegg; Claudio Imhof	3:54.210		
4	Belarus; Raman Tsishkou; Yauheni Akhramenka; Yauheni Karaliok; Hardzei Tsishchanka	OVL		
