= 2020 UEC European Track Championships – Men's individual pursuit =

Men's individual pursuit at the 2020 UEC European Track Championships
- Venue: Kolodruma, Plovdiv
- Date: 14 November
- Competitors: 18 from 12 nations
- Winning time: 4:08.116

Medalists
| gold medal | Ivo Oliveira | Portugal |
| silver medal | Jonathan Milan | Italy |
| bronze medal | Lev Gonov | Russia |

The men's individual pursuit competition at the 2020 UEC European Track Championships was held on 14 November 2020.

== Results ==
=== Qualifying ===
The first two racers raced for gold, the third and fourth fastest rider raced for the bronze medal.

| Rank | Name | Nation | Time | Behind | Notes |
|---|---|---|---|---|---|
| 1 | Jonathan Milan | Italy | 4:06.890 | | QG |
| 2 | Ivo Oliveira | Portugal | 4:07.528 | +0.638 | QG |
| 3 | Alexander Evtushenko | Russia | 4:09.757 | +2.867 | QB |
| 4 | Lev Gonov | Russia | 4:11.940 | +5.050 | QB |
| 5 | Claudio Imhof | Switzerland | 4:12.626 | +5.735 | |
| 6 | Mikhail Shemetau | Belarus | 4:18.362 | +11.472 | |
| 7 | Erik Martorell | Spain | 4:18.998 | +12.108 | |
| 8 | Daniel Crista | Romania | 4:19.686 | +12.796 | |
| 9 | Dzianis Mazur | Belarus | 4:20.609 | +13.718 | |
| 10 | Iúri Leitão | Portugal | 4:21.852 | +14.962 | |
| 11 | Gidas Umbri | Italy | 4:23.783 | +16.893 | |
| 12 | Vitaliy Hryniv | Ukraine | 4:29.127 | +22.236 | |
| 13 | Jan Kraus | Czech Republic | 4:29.612 | +22.722 | |
| 14 | Illia Klepikov | Ukraine | 4:30.003 | +23.113 | |
| 15 | Vitālijs Korņilovs | Latvia | 4:30.735 | +23.845 | |
| 16 | Javier Serrano | Spain | 4:30.799 | +23.909 | |
| 17 | Štefan Michalička | Slovakia | 4:38.983 | +32.093 | |
| 18 | Martin Popov | Bulgaria | 4:41.784 | +34.894 | |

=== Finals ===
| Rank | Name | Nation | Time | Behind | Notes |
|---|---|---|---|---|---|
Gold medal final
| 1st place, gold medalist(s) | Ivo Oliveira | Portugal | 4:08.116 | | |
| 2nd place, silver medalist(s) | Jonathan Milan | Italy | 4:08.772 | +0.656 | |
Bronze medal final
| 3rd place, bronze medalist(s) | Lev Gonov | Russia | 4:07.720 | | |
| 4 | Alexander Evtushenko | Russia | 4:09.800 | +2.080 | |
