= Stefano Moro =

Italian bicycle racer

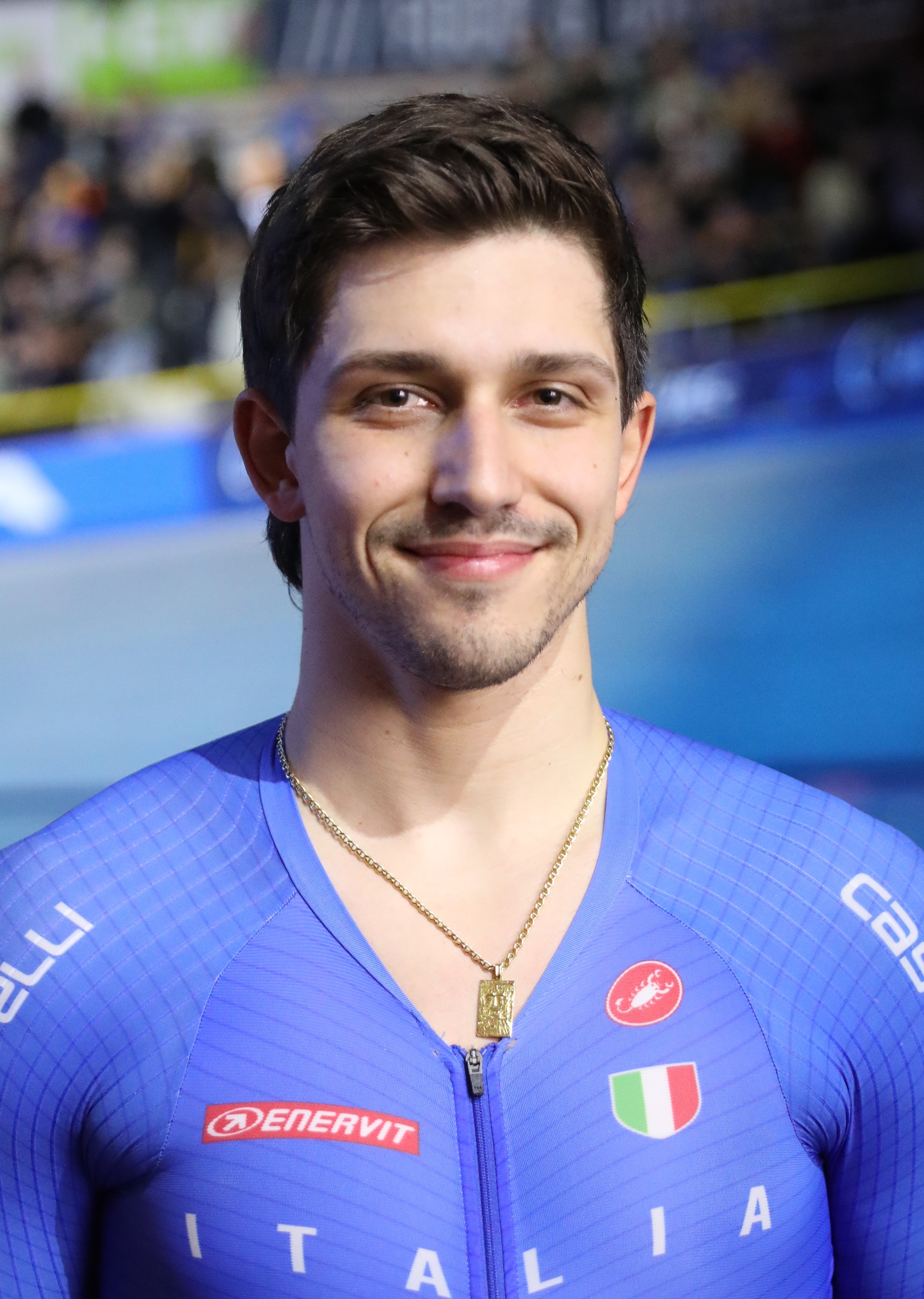
- Moro in 2024

Personal information
- Born: 22 June 1997 (age 29) Fontanella, Italy

Cycling career
- Sport: Cycling
- Current team: Biesse–Carrera–Premac
- Disciplines: Road; Track
- Role: Rider

Amateur teams
- 2016–2017: Gavardo Biesse Carrera Tecmor
- 2016: Unieuro–Wilier (stagiaire)
- 2019: Arvedi

Professional teams
- 2018: Biesse–Carrera Gavardo
- 2020–: Biesse–Arvedi
Medal record
Men's track cycling
Representing Italy
European Games
Silver medal – second place	2019 Minsk	Team pursuit
European Championships
Silver medal – second place	2020 Plovdiv	Team pursuit
Bronze medal – third place	2020 Plovdiv	Madison
Bronze medal – third place	2024 Apeldoorn	Keirin

Stefano Moro (born 22 June 1997 in Fontanella) is an Italian cyclist, who currently rides for UCI Continental team Biesse–Carrera–Premac. He competes in both road and track cycling, but specializes on the track.

== Major results ==
2014
1st Kilometer, National Junior Track Championships
2015
National Junior Track Championships

1st Kilometer
1st Team sprint (with Imerio Cima and Mattia Geroli)

2017
5th Circuito del Porto
2019
2nd Team pursuit, European Games
4th Circuito del Porto
2020
1st Six Days of Fiorenzuola (with Davide Plebani)
2nd Team pursuit, UEC European Track Championships
2019–20 UCI Track World Cup

2nd Team pursuit, Milton
