= 2021 UEC European Track Championships – Men's individual pursuit =

Cycling competition

Men's individual pursuit at the 2021 UEC European Track Championships
- Venue: Tissot Velodrome, Grenchen
- Date: 7 October
- Competitors: 25 from 18 nations

Medalists
gold medal	Jonathan Milan	Italy
silver medal	Lev Gonov	Russia
bronze medal	Claudio Imhof	Switzerland

The men's individual pursuit competition at the 2021 UEC European Track Championships was held on 7 October 2021.

== Results ==
=== Qualifying ===
The first two racers raced for gold, the third and fourth fastest rider raced for the bronze medal.

Rank	Name	Nation	Time	Behind	Notes
1	Jonathan Milan	Italy	4:05.750		QG
2	Lev Gonov	Russia	4:08.917	+3.167	QG
3	Claudio Imhof	Switzerland	4:09.235	+3.485	QB
4	Benjamin Thomas	France	4:09.499	+3.749	QB
5	Nicolas Heinrich	Germany	4:11.139	+5.389	
6	Felix Groß	Germany	4:12.145	+6.395	
7	Charlie Tanfield	Great Britain	4:13.248	+7.498	
8	Manlio Moro	Italy	4:13.301	+7.551	
9	Erik Martorell	Spain	4:14.512	+8.762	
10	Ivan Novolodskii	Russia	4:15.106	+9.356	
11	Daniel Crista	Romania	4:16.802	+11.052	
12	Valère Thiébaud	Switzerland	4:17.714	+11.964	
13	Noah Vandenbranden	Belgium	4:18.299	+12.549	
14	Robin Juel Skivild	Denmark	4:18.649	+12.899	
15	Daniel Staniszewski	Poland	4:18.787	+13.037	
16	Dzianis Mazur	Belarus	4:19.506	+13.756	
17	Damian Sławek	Poland	4:19.611	+13.861	
18	Roy Pieters	Netherlands	4:20.097	+14.347	
19	João Matias	Portugal	4:20.956	+15.206	
20	Volodymyr Dzhus	Ukraine	4:22.663	+16.913	
21	Viktor Filutás	Hungary	4:27.649	+21.899	
22	Brent Van Mulders	Belgium	4:28.418	+22.668	
23	Aliaksei Shmantsar	Belarus	4:34.058	+28.308	
24	Nicolas Pietrula	Czech Republic	4:34.256	+28.506	
25	Vitālijs Korņilovs	Latvia	4:34.530	+28.780	
	Iúri Leitão	Portugal	Did not start		

=== Finals ===
Rank	Name	Nation	Time	Behind	Notes
Gold medal final
1st place, gold medalist(s)	Jonathan Milan	Italy			
2nd place, silver medalist(s)	Lev Gonov	Russia	OVL		
Bronze medal final
3rd place, bronze medalist(s)	Claudio Imhof	Switzerland	4:08.851		
4	Benjamin Thomas	France	4:09.314	+0.463	
