= 2020 UEC European Track Championships – Men's team sprint =

Men's team sprint at the 2020 UEC European Track Championships
- Venue: Kolodruma, Plovdiv
- Date: 11 November
- Competitors: 22 from 6 nations
- Winning time: 43.007

Medalists
gold medal	Denis Dmitriev; Pavel Yakushevskiy; Ivan Gladyshev; Alexander Sharapov	Russia
silver medal	Tomáš Bábek; Dominik Topinka; Martin Čechman; Jakub Šťastný	Czech Republic
bronze medal	Sotirios Bretas; Ioannis Kalogeropoulos; Konstantinos Livanos	Greece

The men's team pursuit competition at the 2020 UEC European Track Championships was held on 11 November 2020.

== Results ==
=== Qualifying ===
All teams advanced to the first round.

Rank	Name	Nation	Time	Behind	Notes
1	Denis Dmitriev; Pavel Yakushevskiy; Alexander Sharapov	Russia	43.719		
2	Tomáš Bábek; Dominik Topinka; Martin Čechman	Czech Republic	43.942	+0.223	
3	Sotirios Bretas; Ioannis Kalogeropoulos; Konstantinos Livanos	Greece	44.368	+0.649	
4	Juan Peralta; Alejandro Martínez; Ekain Jiménez	Spain	44.587	+0.868	
5	Dmytro Stovbetskyi; Tadey-Ivan Chebanets; Bohdan Danylchuk	Ukraine	45.896	+2.177	
6	Miroslav Minchev; Nikolay Genov; Yasen Aleksandrov	Bulgaria	48.515	+4.796	

=== First round ===
First round heats were held as follows:
Heat 1: 1st v 6th fastest
Heat 2: 2nd v 5th fastest
Heat 3: 3rd v 4th fastest

The winners of heats 1 and 2 proceeded to the gold medal race. The winner of heat 3 and the faster loser proceeded to the bronze medal race.

Rank	Name	Nation	Time	Behind	Notes
1 vs 6
1	Denis Dmitriev; Pavel Yakushevskiy; Ivan Gladyshev	Russia	43.123		QG
2	Miroslav Minchev; Nikolay Genov; Georgi Lumparov	Bulgaria	48.063	+4.940	
2 vs 5
1	Tomáš Bábek; Dominik Topinka; Jakub Šťastný	Czech Republic	44.655		QG
2	Dmytro Stovbetskyi; Vladyslav Denysenko; Bohdan Danylchuk	Ukraine	45.326	+0.671	
3 vs 4
1	Sotirios Bretas; Ioannis Kalogeropoulos; Konstantinos Livanos	Greece	44.214		QB
2	Juan Peralta; Alejandro Martínez; Ekain Jiménez	Spain	45.067	+0.853	QB

=== Finals ===
Rank	Name	Nation	Time	Behind	Notes
Gold medal final
1st place, gold medalist(s)	Denis Dmitriev; Pavel Yakushevskiy; Ivan Gladyshev	Russia	43.007		
2nd place, silver medalist(s)	Tomáš Bábek; Dominik Topinka; Martin Čechman	Czech Republic	43.925	+0.917	
Bronze medal final
3rd place, bronze medalist(s)	Sotirios Bretas; Ioannis Kalogeropoulos; Konstantinos Livanos	Greece	44.098		
4	Juan Peralta; Alejandro Martínez; Ekain Jiménez	Spain	44.561	+0.463	
