= Clément Davy =

French cyclist

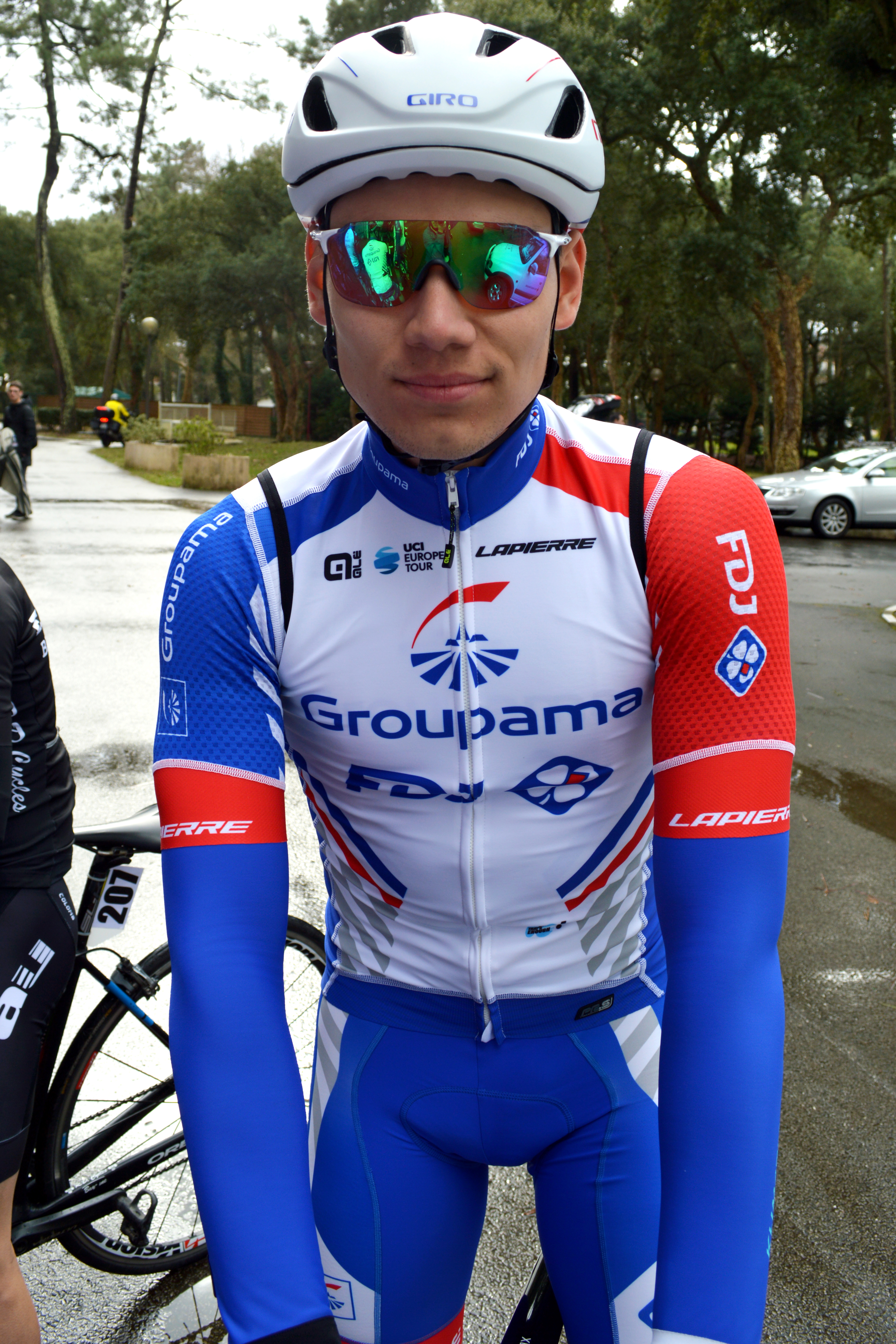
- Clément Davy in 2019

Personal information
- Born: 17 July 1998 (age 28) Hyères, France
- Height: 1.84 m (6 ft 0 in)
- Weight: 73 kg (161 lb)

Cycling career
- Sport: Cycling
- Current team: Groupama–FDJ United
- Disciplines: Road; Track
- Role: Rider

Amateur teams
- 2015–2016: Bocage Mayennais
- 2017: Laval 53
- 2018: Sojasun espoir–ACNC
- 2018: Groupama–FDJ (stagiaire)
- 2020: Groupama–FDJ (stagiaire)

Professional teams
- 2019–2020: Équipe Continentale Groupama–FDJ
- 2020: Groupama–FDJ (development) (Note: Riding for Groupama–FDJ, Davy competed in Milano–Torino following the introduction of a UCI rule allowing riders registered with a development team to participate in UCI ProSeries or Class 1 events.)
- 2021–: Groupama–FDJ

Clément Davy (born 17 July 1998) is a French cyclist, who currently rides for UCI WorldTeam Groupama–FDJ United.

He also competes in track cycling, and rode in the individual pursuit at the 2019 UCI Track Cycling World Championships.

== Major results ==
=== Road ===
2017
1st Time trial, National Junior Road Championships
3rd Overall Trophée Centre Morbihan
4th Chrono des Nations Juniors
2019
3rd Chrono des Nations
6th Chrono Champenois
2020
10th Time trial, UEC European Under-23 Road Championships

=== Track ===
2016
National Junior Track Championships

1st Team pursuit
2nd Individual pursuit
2nd Points race

2017
National Track Championships

1st Team pursuit
2nd Scratch

2018
3rd Scratch, UCI World Cup, Hong Kong

=== Grand Tour general classification results timeline ===
| Grand Tour | 2022 | 2023 | 2024 |
|---|---|---|---|
| Giro d'Italia | 144 | — | DNF |
| Tour de France | — | — | — |
| Vuelta a España | — | 135 | — |

Legend
| — | Did not compete |
| DNF | Did not finish |
