= Ivan Gladyshev =

Russian cyclist

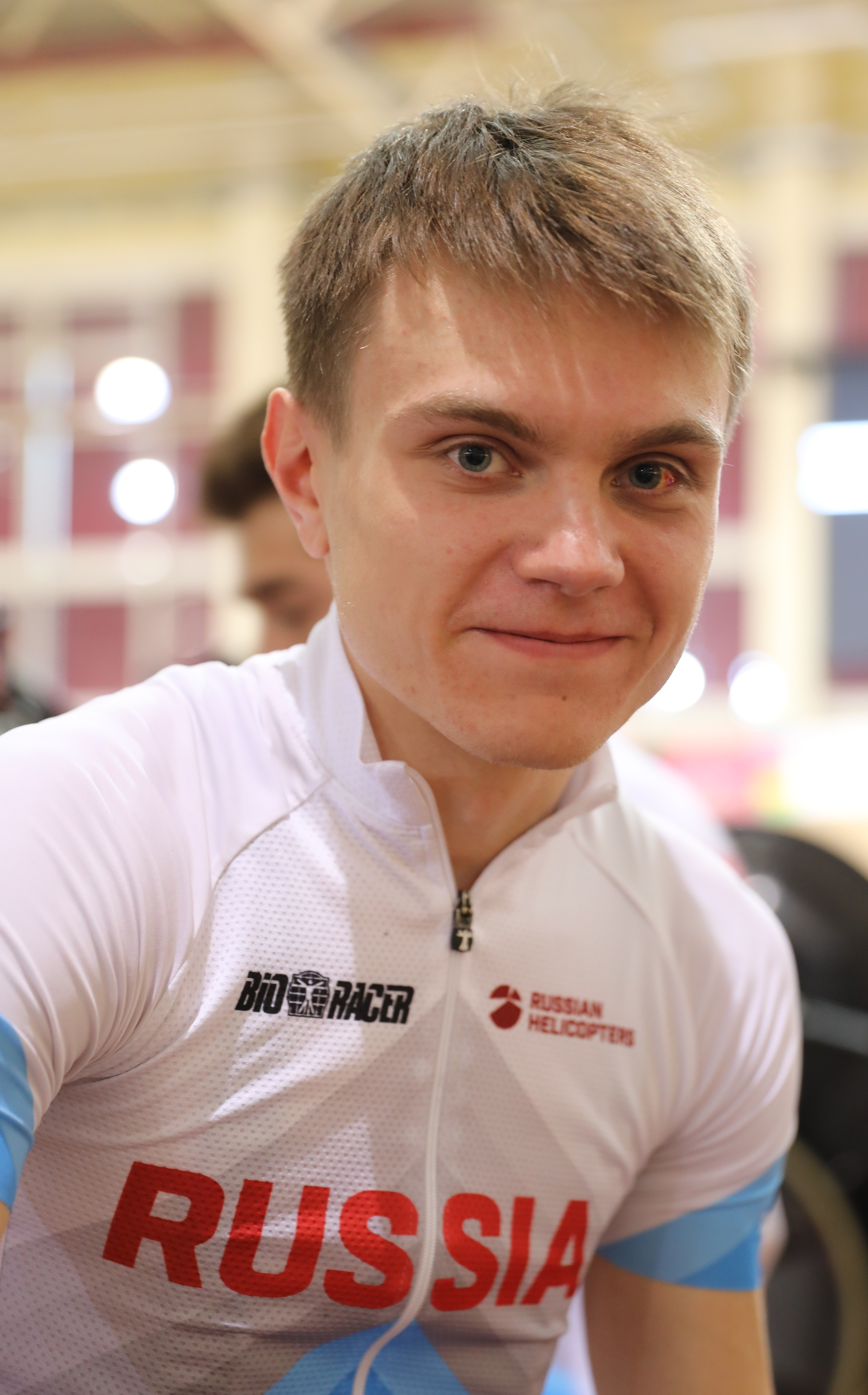
- Gladyshev in 2019

Personal information
- Born: 13 August 2001 (age 25)

Cycling career
- Sport: Cycling
- Role: Rider
Medal record
Men's track cycling
Representing Russia
European Championships
Gold medal – first place	2020 Plovdiv	Team sprint
Junior World Championships
Bronze medal – third place	2018 Aigle	Team sprint
U23 & Junior European Championships
Gold medal – first place	2018 Aigle	Junior Sprint
Gold medal – first place	2018 Aigle	Junior Team sprint
Silver medal – second place	2019 Ghent	Junior Keirin

Ivan Gladyshev (born 13 August 2001) is a Russian racing cyclist. In November 2020, he competed in the men's team sprint event at the 2020 UEC European Track Championships in Plovdiv, Bulgaria, winning the gold medal.
