= 2019 UCI Track Cycling World Championships – Men's individual pursuit =

Seventy-fourth edition of the cycling race

Men's individual pursuit at the 2019 UCI Track Cycling World Championships
- Venue: BGŻ Arena
- Location: Pruszków, Poland
- Dates: 1 March
- Competitors: 25 from 17 nations
- Winning time: 4:07.992

Medalists
gold medal	Filippo Ganna	Italy
silver medal	Domenic Weinstein	Germany
bronze medal	Davide Plebani	Italy

The Men's individual pursuit competition at the 2019 UCI Track Cycling World Championships was held on 1 March 2019.

== Results ==
=== Qualifying ===
The qualifying was started at 15:43. The first two racers raced for gold, the third and fourth fastest rider raced for the bronze medal.

Rank	Name	Nation	Time	Behind	Notes
1	Filippo Ganna	Italy	4:07.456		Q
2	Domenic Weinstein	Germany	4:09.091	+1.635	Q
3	Davide Plebani	Italy	4:11.764	+4.308	q
4	Alexander Evtushenko	Russia	4:11.957	+4.501	q
5	Ashton Lambie	United States	4:12.886	+5.430	
6	Ivo Oliveira	Portugal	4:14.127	+6.671	
7	John Archibald	Great Britain	4:14.730	+7.274	
8	Claudio Imhof	Switzerland	4:16.583	+9.127	
9	Stefan Bissegger	Switzerland	4:17.265	+9.809	
10	Leon Rohde	Germany	4:19.838	+12.382	
11	Felix Groß	Germany	4:19.937	+12.481	
12	Mikhail Shemetau	Belarus	4:20.346	+12.890	
13	Adrian Kaiser	Poland	4:20.523	+13.067	
14	Gavin Hoover	United States	4:21.596	+14.140	
15	Clément Davy	France	4:24.362	+16.906	
16	Alexander Porter	Australia	4:25.562	+18.106	
17	Im Jae-yeon	South Korea	4:30.256	+22.800	
18	Nicolas Pietrula	Czech Republic	4:31.977	+24.521	
19	Alisher Zhumakan	Kazakhstan	4:32.462	+25.006	
20	Li Wen-chao	Chinese Taipei	4:34.730	+27.274	
21	Min Kyeong-ho	South Korea	4:34.874	+27.418	
22	Yuttana Mano	Thailand	4:38.046	+30.590	
23	Ko Siu Wai	Hong Kong	4:38.820	+31.364	

=== Finals ===
The final was started at 20:32.

Rank	Name	Nation	Time	Behind
Gold medal race
1st place, gold medalist(s)	Filippo Ganna	Italy	4:07.992	
2nd place, silver medalist(s)	Domenic Weinstein	Germany	4:12.571	+4.579
Bronze medal race
3rd place, bronze medalist(s)	Davide Plebani	Italy	4:14.572	
4	Alexander Evtushenko	Russia	4:16.784	+2.212
