= Matteo Donegà =

Italian cyclist

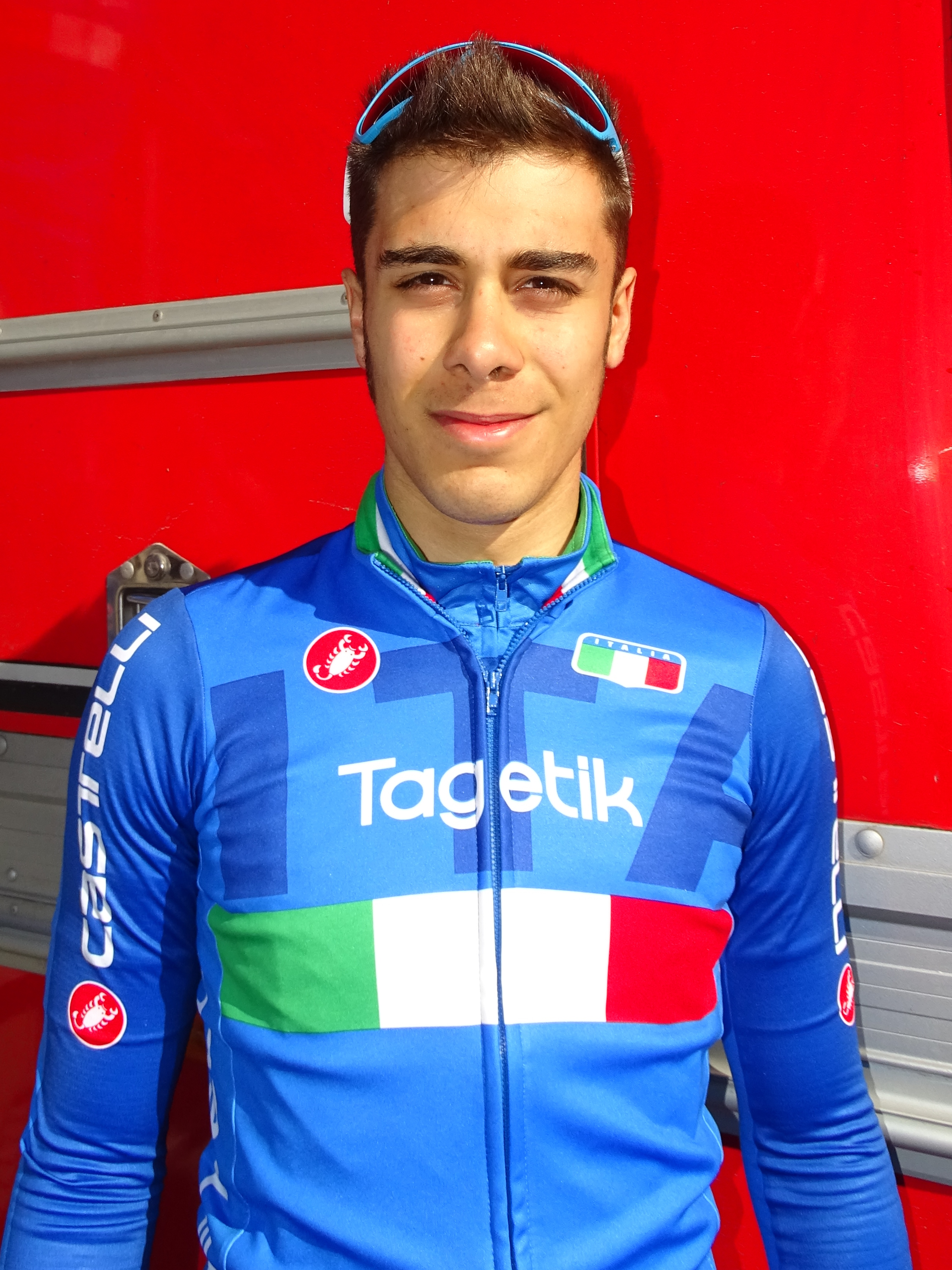
- Donegà at the 2016 Paris–Roubaix Juniors

Personal information
- Born: 1 April 1998 (age 28) Bondeno, Italy

Cycling career
- Sport: Cycling
- Current team: Bahrain Victorious Development Team
- Disciplines: Road; Track
- Role: Rider

Amateur team
- 2017–2018: Cycling Team Friuli

Professional team
- 2019–: Cycling Team Friuli
Medal record
Men's track cycling
Representing Italy
European Championships
Silver medal – second place	2020 Plovdiv	Points race
U23 & Junior European Championships
Silver medal – second place	2016 Montichiari	Junior Points race
Silver medal – second place	2018 Aigle	U23 Points race

Matteo Donegà (born 1 April 1998 in Bondeno) is an Italian cyclist, who currently rides for UCI Continental team Bahrain Victorious Development Team.

== Major results ==
2016
1st Omnium, National Junior Track Championships
2nd Points race, UEC European Junior Track Championships
2nd Trofeo Guido Dorigo
3rd Trofeo Buffoni
4th Montichiari - Roncone
2018
2nd Points race, UEC European Under-23 Track Championships
4th Trofeo Piva
2020
2nd Points race, UEC European Track Championships
