= 2020 UEC European Track Championships =

Cycling championships

- Venue: Plovdiv, Bulgaria
- Date(s): 11–15 November
- Velodrome: Kolodruma
- Events: 22 (11 women, 11 men)

The 2020 UEC European Track Championships was the eleventh edition of the elite UEC European Track Championships in track cycling and took place at the Kolodruma in Plovdiv, Bulgaria, between 11 and 15 November 2020. The event was organised by the European Cycling Union. All European champions are awarded the UEC European Champion jersey which may be worn by the champion throughout the year when competing in the same event at other competitions.

== Schedule ==
Competition	F	Final

Men
Date →	Wed 11		Thu 12		Fri 13		Sat 14		Sun 15	
Event ↓	A	E	A	E	A	E	A	E	M	A
Sprint			Q,^{1}/_{16},^{1}/_{8}	QF		SF, F				
Team sprint	Q	R1, F								
Team pursuit	Q	R1		F						
Keirin							R1, R	SF, F		
Omnium					SR, TR	ER, PR				
Madison										F
1 km time trial									Q	F
Pursuit							Q	F		
Points race								F		
Scratch				F						
Elimination race		F								

Women
Date →	Wed 11		Thu 12		Fri 13		Sat 14		Sun 15	
Event ↓	A	E	A	E	A	E	A	E	M	A
Sprint			Q,^{1}/_{8}	QF		SF, F				
Team sprint	Q	R1, F								
Team pursuit	Q	R1		F						
Keirin							R1	F		
Omnium					SR, TR	ER, PR				
Madison										F
500 m time trial										F
Pursuit					Q	F				
Points race								F		
Scratch		F								
Elimination race				F						

M = Morning session, A = Afternoon session, E = Evening session
Q = qualifiers, R1 = first round, R = repechages, ^{1}/_{16} = sixteenth finals, ^{1}/_{8} = eighth finals, QF = quarterfinals, SF = semifinals,
SR = Scratch Race, TR = Tempo Race, ER = Elimination Race, PR = Points Race

== Events ==
Event	Gold		Silver		Bronze	
Men's events
Sprint	Maximilian Levy; Germany		Denis Dmitriev; Russia		Vasilijus Lendel; Lithuania	
Team sprint	Russia; Denis Dmitriev; Pavel Yakushevskiy; Ivan Gladyshev; Alexander Sharapov	43.007	Czech Republic; Tomáš Bábek; Dominik Topinka; Martin Čechman; Jakub Šťastný	43.925	Greece; Sotirios Bretas; Ioannis Kalogeropoulos; Konstantinos Livanos	44.098
Team pursuit	Russia; Alexander Dubchenko; Lev Gonov; Nikita Bersenev; Alexander Evtushenko	3:54.677	Italy; Francesco Lamon; Stefano Moro; Jonathan Milan; Gidas Umbri	3:54.787	Switzerland; Claudio Imhof; Simon Vitzthum; Lukas Rüegg; Dominik Bieler	3:55.051
Keirin	Maximilian Levy; Germany		Denis Dmitriev; Russia		Sotirios Bretas; Greece	
Omnium	Matthew Walls; Great Britain	128 pts	Yauheni Karaliok; Belarus	116 pts	Iúri Leitão; Portugal	115 pts
Madison	Spain; Sebastián Mora; Albert Torres	51 pts	Portugal; Ivo Oliveira; Rui Oliveira	43 pts	Italy; Francesco Lamon; Stefano Moro	33 pts
1 km time trial^{[N]}	Tomáš Bábek; Czech Republic	1:00.517	Ethan Vernon; Great Britain	1:00.999	Jonathan Milan; Italy	1:01.009
Individual pursuit^{[N]}	Ivo Oliveira; Portugal	4:08.116	Jonathan Milan; Italy	4:08.772	Lev Gonov; Russia	4:07.720
Points race^{[O]}	Sebastián Mora; Spain	51 pts	Matteo Donegà; Italy	42 pts	Daniel Crista; Romania	40 pts
Scratch^{[O]}	Iúri Leitão; Portugal		Roman Gladysh; Ukraine		Oliver Wood; Great Britain	
Elimination race^{[O]}	Matthew Walls; Great Britain		Iúri Leitão; Portugal		Sergey Rostovtsev; Russia	
Women's events
Sprint	Anastasia Voynova; Russia		Daria Shmeleva; Russia		Olena Starikova; Ukraine	
Team sprint	Russia; Anastasia Voynova; Daria Shmeleva; Natalia Antonova; Ekaterina Rogovaya	46.852	Great Britain; Milly Tanner; Blaine Ridge-Davis; Lusia Steele; Lauren Bate	48.531	Ukraine; Liubov Basova; Olena Starikova; Oleksandra Lohviniuk	49.296
Team pursuit	Great Britain; Josie Knight; Laura Kenny; Katie Archibald; Neah Evans; Elinor Barker	4:10.437	Italy; Martina Alzini; Elisa Balsamo; Chiara Consonni; Vittoria Guazzini; Rachele Barbieri	4:13.632	Ukraine; Anna Nahirna; Tetyana Klimchenko; Viktoriya Bondar; Yuliia Biriukova	4:33.833
Keirin	Olena Starikova; Ukraine		Sára Kaňkovská; Czech Republic		Helena Casas; Spain	
Omnium	Elisa Balsamo; Italy	135 pts	Laura Kenny; Great Britain	126 pts	Maria Novolodskaya; Russia	114 pts
Madison	Italy; Elisa Balsamo; Vittoria Guazzini	52 pts	Russia; Diana Klimova; Maria Novolodskaya	51 pts	Great Britain; Laura Kenny; Elinor Barker	38 pts
500 m time trial^{[N]}	Daria Shmeleva; Russia	32.720	Anastasia Voynova; Russia	33.719	Miriam Vece; Italy	33.769
Individual pursuit^{[N]}	Neah Evans; Great Britain	3:29.456	Martina Alzini; Italy	3:32.386	Silvia Valsecchi; Italy	3:28.878
Points race^{[O]}	Katie Archibald; Great Britain	57 pts	Silvia Zanardi; Italy	39 pts	Karolina Karasiewicz; Poland	35 pts
Scratch^{[O]}	Martina Fidanza; Italy		Hanna Tserakh; Belarus		Tetyana Klimchenko; Ukraine	
Elimination race^{[O]}	Elinor Barker; Great Britain		Rachele Barbieri; Italy		Maria Martins; Portugal	

- Competitors named in italics only participated in rounds prior to the final.
- ^{^{N}} These events are not contested in the Olympics.
- ^{^{O}} In the Olympics, these events are contested within the omnium only.

== Medal table ==
Rank	Nation	Gold	Silver	Bronze	Total
1	Great Britain	6	3	2	11
2	Russia	5	5	3	13
3	Italy	3	7	4	14
4	Portugal	2	2	2	6
5	Spain	2	0	1	3
6	Germany	2	0	0	2
7	Czech Republic	1	2	0	3
8	Ukraine	1	1	4	6
9	Belarus	0	2	0	2
10	Greece	0	0	2	2
11	Lithuania	0	0	1	1
11	Poland	0	0	1	1
11	Romania	0	0	1	1
11	Switzerland	0	0	1	1
Totals (14 entries)		22	22	22	66
