= BelAZ (cycling team) =

Belarusian cycling team

Team information
- UCI code: BAZ
- Registered: Belarus
- Founded: 2021
- Discipline: Road
- Status: UCI Continental

Key personnel
- Team manager: Vasil Kiryienka

Team name history
- 2021–: BelAZ

BelAZ is a Belarusian UCI Continental cycling team focusing on road bicycle racing.

The team was formed around the Belarus National Track cycling team. With former World Time trial champion Vasil Kiryienka as sports director.

After the 2022 Russian invasion of Ukraine, the UCI said that Belarusian teams are forbidden from competing in international events.

== Team roster ==
As of 10 March 2021.

Rider	Date of birth
Yauheni Akhramenka (BLR)	30 June 1995 (age 31)
Kanstantsin Bialiauski (BLR)	13 January 1998 (age 28)
Kiryl Kavaliou (BLR)	11 April 2001 (age 25)
Dzianis Mazur (BLR)	19 April 2000 (age 26)
Kiryl Prymakou (BLR)	20 September 2001 (age 24)

Rider	Date of birth
Raman Ramanau (BLR)	3 July 1994 (age 32)
Tsikhan Shchamialiou (BLR)	9 September 2000 (age 25)
Aliaksei Shmantsar (BLR)	12 May 2000 (age 26)
Hardzei Tsishchanka (BLR)	16 August 1995 (age 31)
Raman Tsishkou (BLR)	2 December 1994 (age 31)

== Major wins ==
2021
Grand Prix Gazipasa, Raman Tsishkou
