= Grand Prix Mount Erciyes =

Grand Prix Mount Erciyes 2200 mt
Race details
- Date: September
- Discipline: Road
- Competition: UCI Europe Tour
- Type: One-day race

History
- First edition: 2020; 5 years ago
- Editions: 1 (as of 2020)
- First winner: Ivan Smirnov (RUS) (men); Mariia Novolodskaia (RUS) (women)
- Most wins: No repeat winners
- Most recent: Ivan Smirnov (RUS) (men); Mariia Novolodskaia (RUS) (women)

The Grand Prix Mount Erciyes 2200 mt is a men's and women's one-day road cycling race held in Turkey. It is rated as a 1.2 event on the UCI Europe Tour.

== Winners ==
=== Men ===
Year	Country	Rider	Team
2020	Russia	Ivan Smirnov	Russia national team

=== Women ===
Year	Country	Rider	Team
2020	Russia	Mariia Novolodskaia	Moscow Regional Team
