= Sotirios Bretas =

Greek cyclist (born 1990)

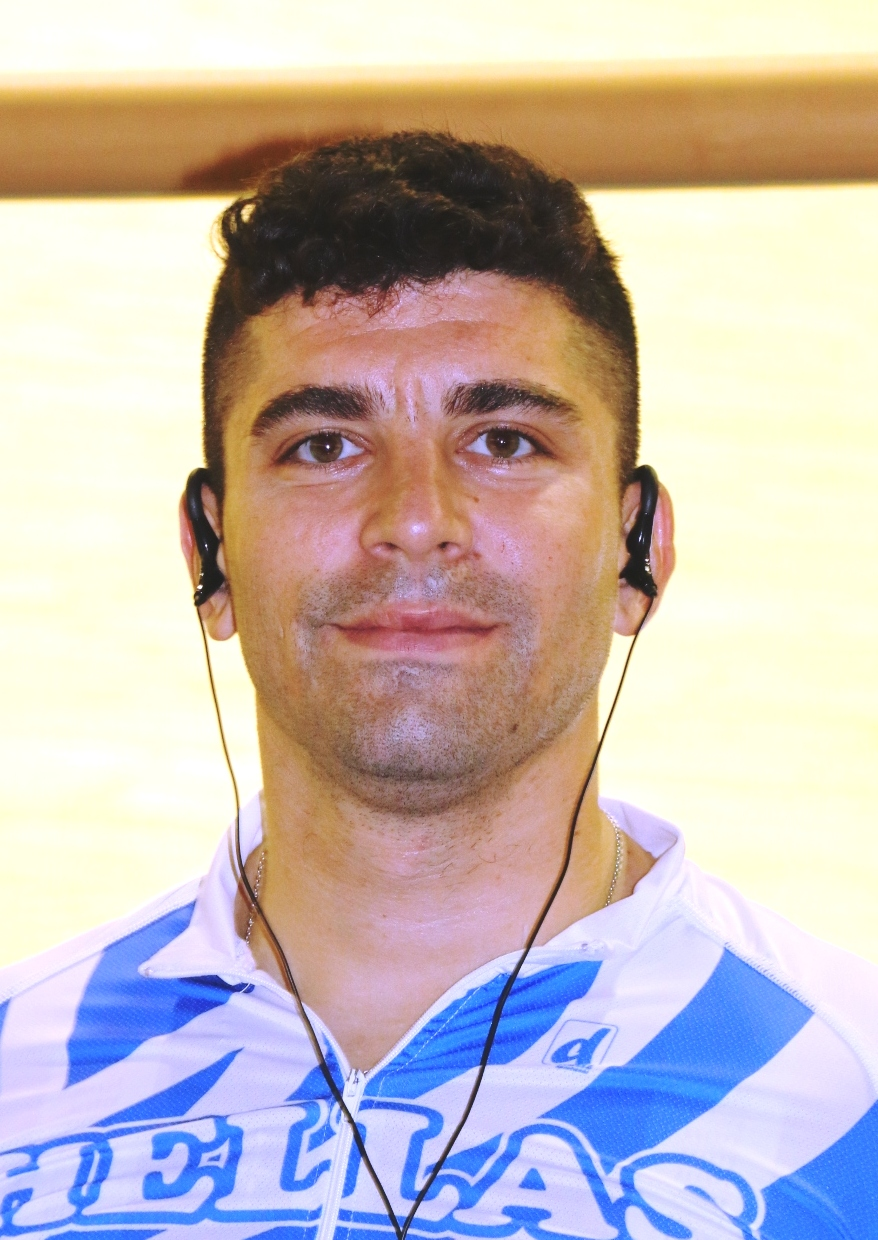
- Bretas in 2017

Personal information
- Born: 12 March 1990 (age 36)

Cycling career
- Sport: Cycling
- Discipline: Track cycling
- Role: Rider
- Rider type: sprint team sprint scratch
Medal record
Men's track cycling
Representing Greece
European Championships
Bronze medal – third place	2020 Plovdiv	Keirin
Bronze medal – third place	2020 Plovdiv	Team sprint
Junior World Championships
Silver medal – second place	2008 Cape Town	Keirin

Sotirios Bretas (born 12 March 1990) is a Greek male track cyclist. He competed in the sprint, team sprint and scratch events at the 2013 UCI Track Cycling World Championships.
