= Lukas Rüegg =

Swiss cyclist (born 1996)

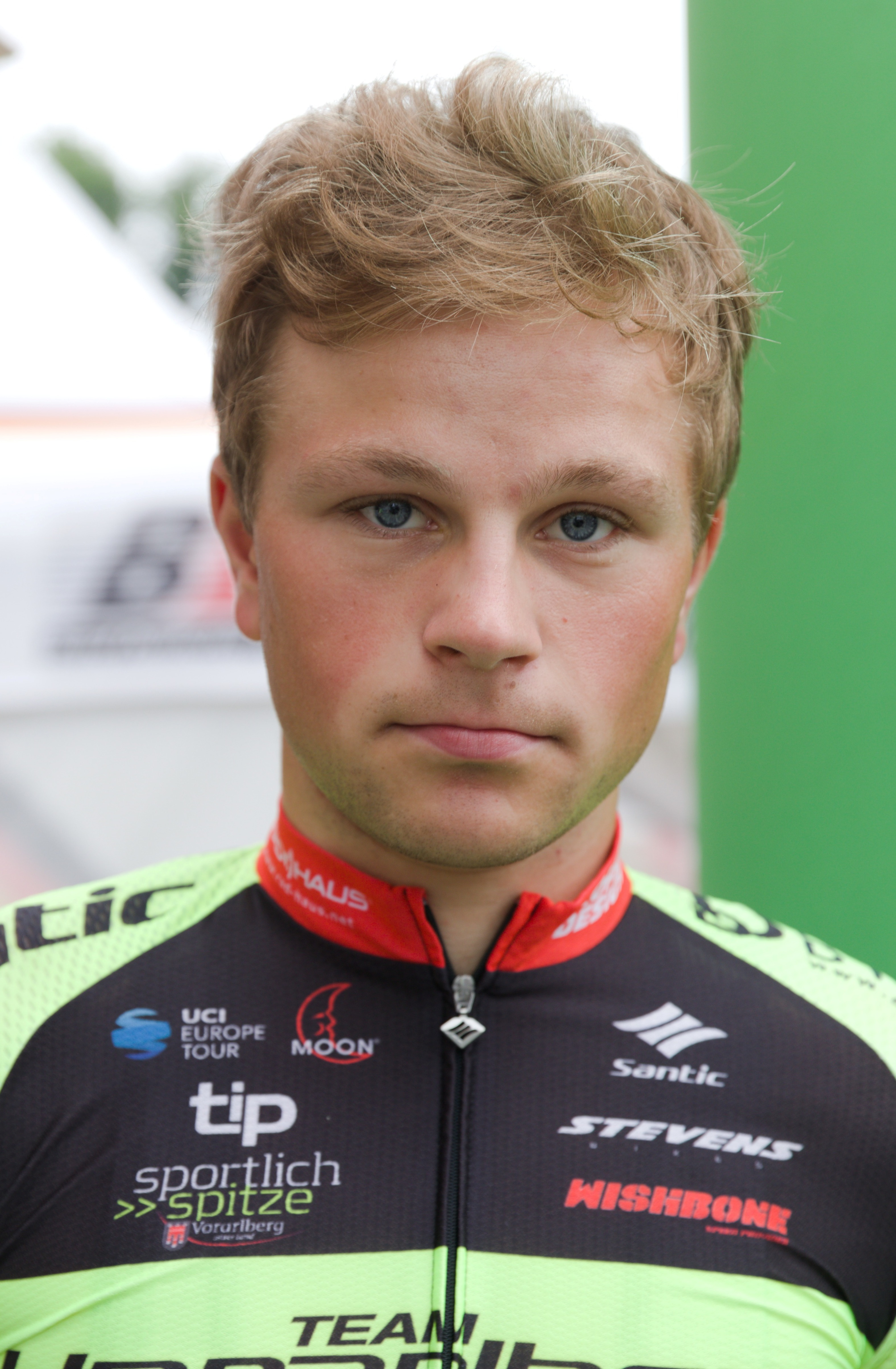
- Rüegg in 2018

Personal information
- Full name: Lukas Rüegg
- Born: 9 September 1996 (age 30) Russikon, Switzerland
- Height: 1.77 m (5 ft 10 in)
- Weight: 66 kg (146 lb)

Cycling career
- Sport: Cycling
- Current team: Tudor Pro Cycling Team
- Disciplines: Road; Track
- Role: Rider

Professional teams
- 2018: Team Vorarlberg Santic
- 2019–: Swiss Racing Academy
Medal record
Representing Switzerland
Men's track cycling
European Games
Bronze medal – third place	2019 Minsk	Team pursuit
European Championships
Bronze medal – third place	2020 Plovdiv	Team pursuit
U23 & Junior European Championships
Silver medal – second place	2018 Aigle	U23 Team pursuit
Bronze medal – third place	2014 Anadia	Junior Team pursuit
Bronze medal – third place	2018 Aigle	U23 Madison

Lukas Rüegg (born 9 September 1996) is a Swiss racing cyclist, who currently rides for UCI Continental team Tudor Pro Cycling Team. He rode for Team Vorarlberg Santic in the men's team time trial event at the 2018 UCI Road World Championships.

== Major results ==
=== Road ===
2017
4th International Rhodes Grand Prix
2018
1st Road race, National Under-23 Road Championships
10th Overall Rás Tailteann

1st Mountains classification

2019
5th Tour de Vendée
7th Overall International Tour of Rhodes
8th International Rhodes Grand Prix
2021
5th Overall Tour de la Mirabelle
7th Overall Tour de Bretagne

=== Track ===
2013
3rd Team sprint, National Championships
2014
3rd Team pursuit, UEC European Junior Championships
3rd Team sprint, National Championships
2015
3rd Team sprint, National Championships
2016
National Championships

3rd Elimination race
3rd Team sprint

2017
National Championships

1st Team pursuit
1st Team sprint

3rd Team pursuit – Milton, 2017–18 UCI World Cup
2018
UEC European Under-23 Championships

2nd Team pursuit
3rd Madison

2nd Scratch, National Championships
2019
1st Team pursuit – Cambridge, 2019–20 UCI World Cup
3rd Team pursuit, European Games
3rd Team pursuit – Cambridge, 2018–19 UCI World Cup
3rd Elimination race, National Championships
2020
National Championships

2nd Scratch
3rd Points race
3rd Elimination race

3rd Team pursuit, UEC European Championships
