= Simon Vitzthum =

Swiss cyclist (born 1995)

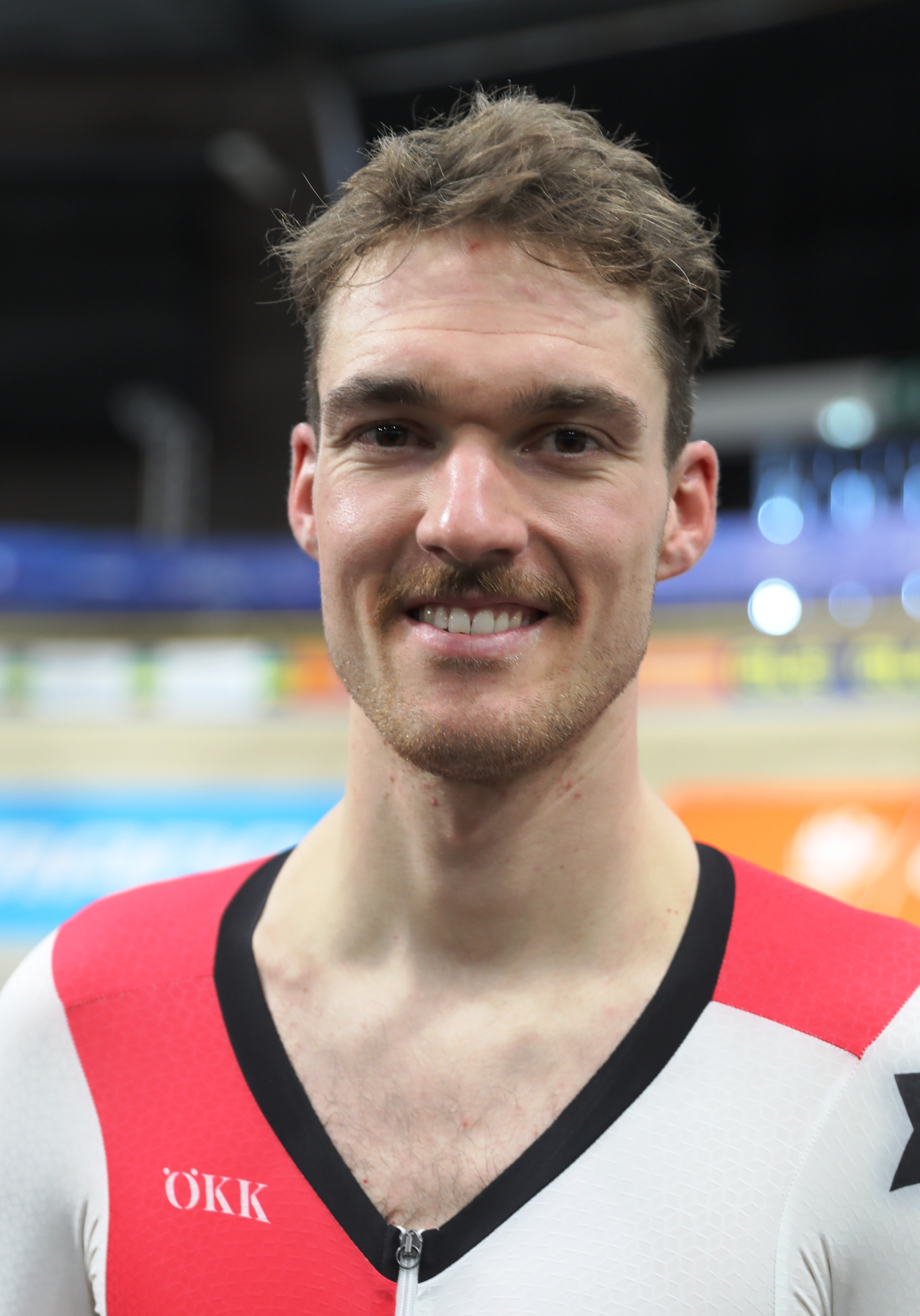
- Simon Vitzthum (2024)

Personal information
- Born: 19 January 1995 (age 31) Arbon, Switzerland
- Height: 1.88 m (6 ft 2 in)
- Weight: 70 kg (154 lb)

Cycling career
- Sport: Cycling
- Current team: jb Brunex Felt Factory Team
- Disciplines: Road; Track; Mountain bike; Cyclo-cross
- Role: Rider
Medal record
Representing Switzerland
Men's track cycling
European Championships
Silver medal – second place	2021 Grenchen	Team pursuit
Bronze medal – third place	2020 Plovdiv	Team pursuit

Simon Vitzthum (born 19 January 1995) is a Swiss racing cyclist, who competes on the road, track, cyclo-cross and in cross-country mountain biking.

== Major results ==
=== Track ===
2019
1st Elimination race, National Championships
2020
National Championships

1st Scratch
2nd Points race
3rd Team pursuit

3rd Team pursuit, UEC European Championships
2021
1st Points race, National Championships
2nd Team pursuit, UEC European Championships
2022
National Championships

1st Points race
1st Omnium
1st Madison (with Valère Thiébaud)
1st Individual pursuit

2023
1st Madison, National Championships (with Claudio Imhof)

=== Road ===
2022
1st Tour de Berne
3rd Overall Tour de la Mirabelle
2023
1st GP Cham-Hagendorn
4th Time trial, National Championships

=== Cyclo-cross ===
2012–2013
2nd National Junior Championships
2015–2016
2nd National Under-23 Championships

=== MTB ===
2013
2nd Cross-country, National Junior Championships
2017
2nd Cross-country, National Under-23 Championships
2020
1st PROFFIX Swiss Bike Cup
