= Ivan Smirnov (cyclist) =

Russian cyclist

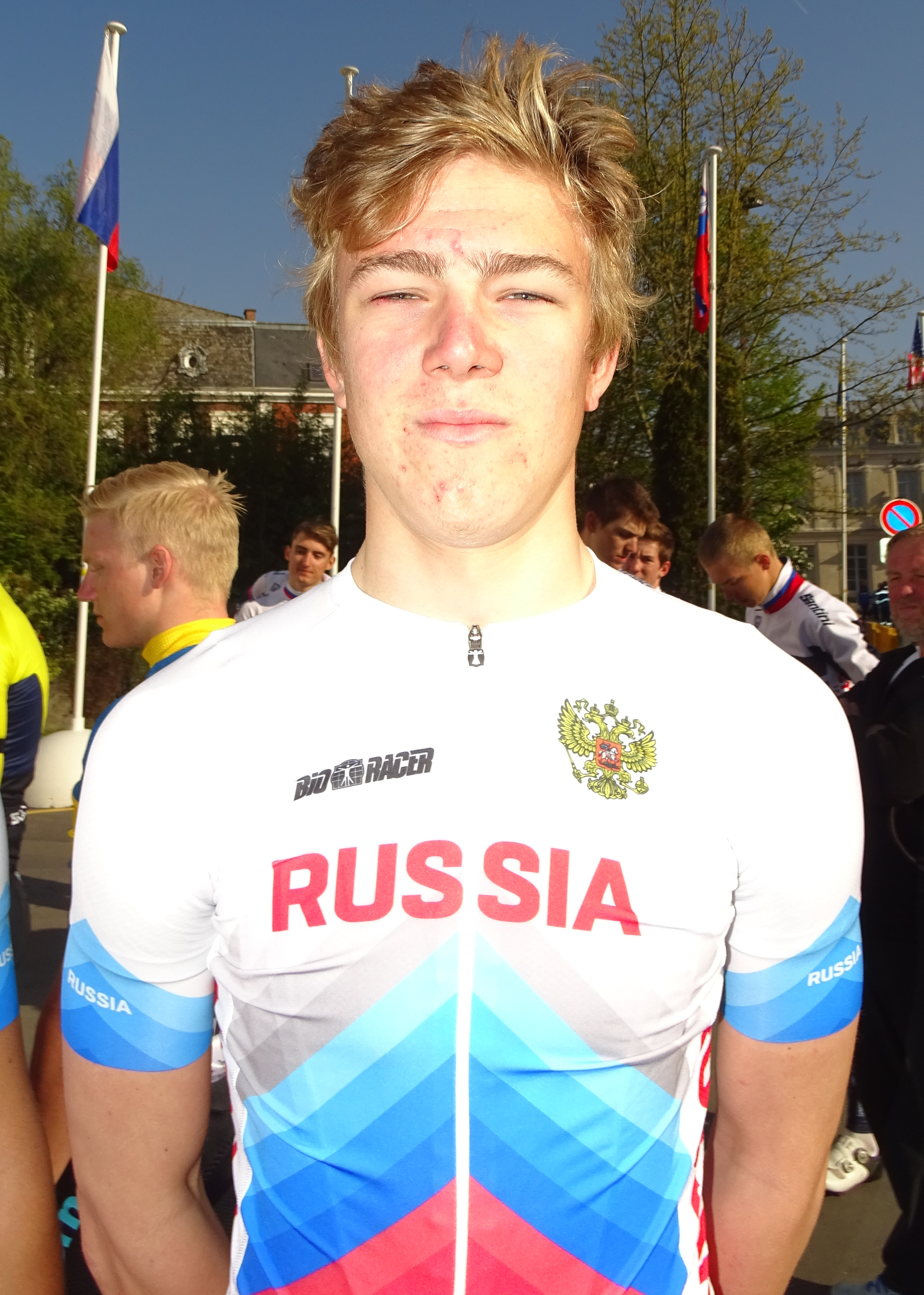
- Smirnov in 2017

Personal information
- Full name: Ivan Vadimovich Smirnov
- Born: 14 January 1999 (age 27)
- Height: 1.86 m (6 ft 1 in)
- Weight: 74 kg (163 lb)

Cycling career
- Sport: Cycling
- Current team: XDS Astana Development Team
- Disciplines: Road; Track
- Role: Rider

Amateur teams
- 2017: Lokosphinx Juniors
- 2018–2020: Lokosphinx U23
- 2023: C.C. Catalunya–Barcelona
- 2024: PC Baix Ebre

Professional teams
- 2021: Lokosphinx
- 2024: Astana Qazaqstan Team (stagiaire)
- 2025–: XDS Astana Development Team
Medal record
Men's track cycling
Representing Russia
European Games
Gold medal – first place	2019 Minsk	Individual pursuit
Gold medal – first place	2019 Minsk	Team pursuit

Ivan Vadimovich Smirnov (Russian: Иван Вадимович Смирнов; born 14 January 1999) is a Russian racing cyclist, who currently rides for UCI Continental team XDS Astana Development Team. He rode in the men's team pursuit event at the 2018 UCI Track Cycling World Championships.

== Major results ==
=== Track ===
2016
UEC European Junior Championships

2nd Individual pursuit
3rd Team pursuit

2017
1st Team pursuit, UCI World Junior Championships
UEC European Junior Championships

1st Team pursuit
1st Individual pursuit

2nd Team pursuit, National Championships
UCI World Cup

3rd Team pursuit, Minsk
3rd Team pursuit, Pruszkow

2018
National Championships

1st Madison (with Aleksandr Smirnov)
1st Team pursuit

UEC European Under-23 Championships

2nd Individual pursuit
3rd Team pursuit

2019
European Games

1st Team pursuit
1st Individual pursuit

UEC European Under-23 Championships

1st Team pursuit
2nd Individual pursuit

National Championships

1st Team pursuit
2nd Madison
2nd Individual pursuit

2020
UEC European Under-23 Championships

1st Team pursuit
1st Madison (with Lev Gonov)
2nd Individual pursuit
3rd Kilo

National Championships

1st Team pursuit
1st Madison (with Lev Gonov)

2021
UCI Nations Cup

1st Madison, Saint Petersburg (with Lev Gonov)
1st Team pursuit, Saint Petersburg

2023
3rd Six Days of Fiorenzuola (with Lev Gonov)
2024
1st Six Days of Fiorenzuola (with Lev Gonov)

=== Road ===
2017
1st Stage 3a Trofeo Karlsberg
3rd Overall Grand Prix Rüebliland
7th Trofeo comune di Vertova
2020
1st Grand Prix Mount Erciyes
2nd Grand Prix Cappadocia
2021
4th Circuito del Porto
2023
1st Championnat de Sabadell
1st Giro del Medio Polesine
1st Stage 4 Five Rings of Moscow
2024 (1 pro win
1st Trofeu Joan Escolà
1st Trofeo Ayuntamiento de Zamora
1st Campionat de Sabadell
1st Trofeo Caja Rural
1st Stage 5 Tour of Hainan
1st Stage 4 Turul Romaniei
2nd Overall Five Rings of Moscow

1st Stage 1

3rd Overall Tour de Kyushu

1st Stage 3

2025
1st La Popolarissima
