= Carloalberto Giordani =

Italian cyclist (born 1997)

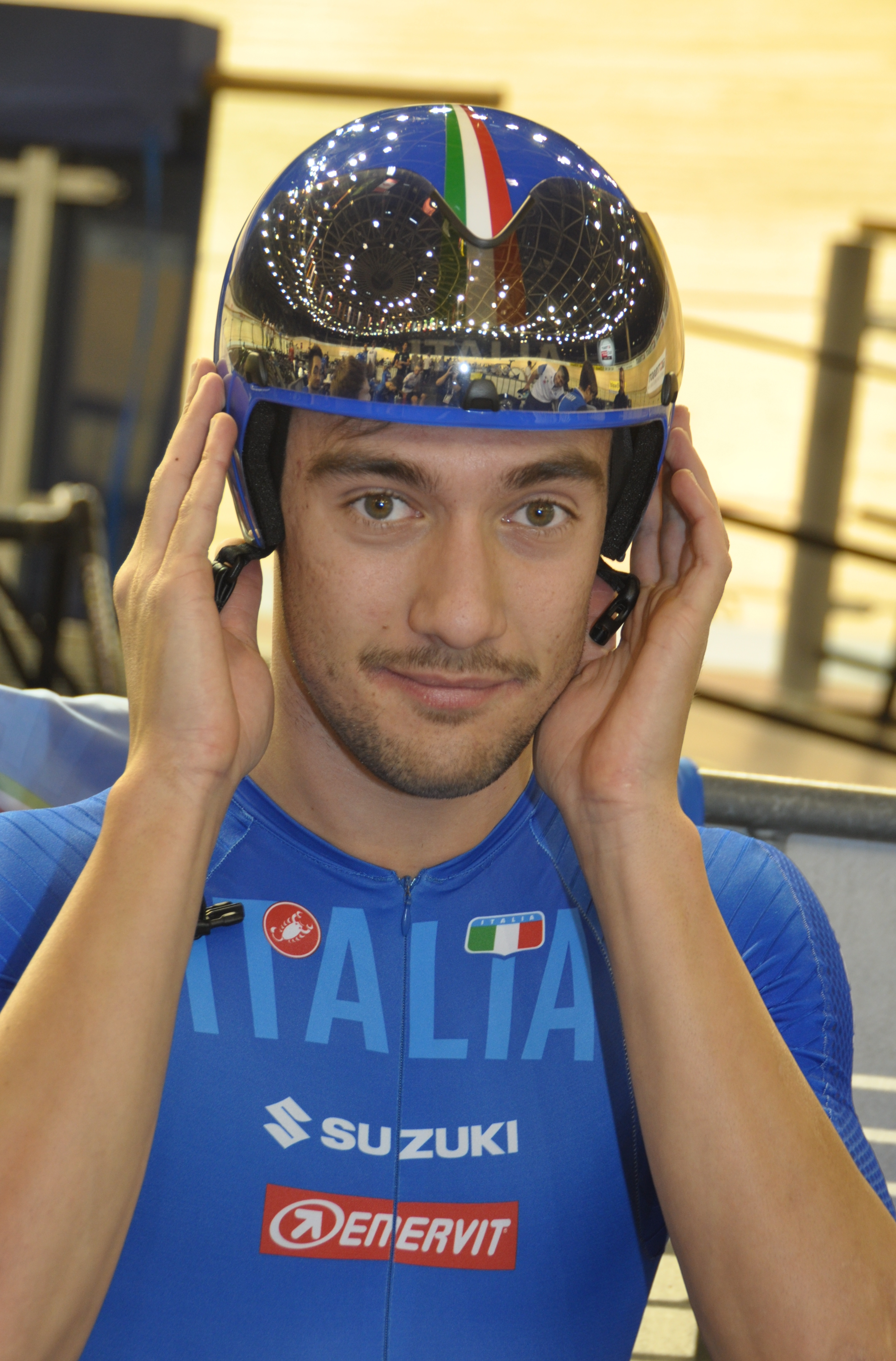
- Giordani in 2018

Personal information
- Full name: Carloalberto Giordani
- Born: 24 October 1997 (age 28)

Cycling career
- Sport: Cycling
- Current team: Biesse–Carrera–Premac
- Disciplines: Road; Track
- Role: Rider

Amateur teams
- 2010–2013: V.C. Isolano–Stella81–Sartori
- 2014–2015: Cipollini–Assali Stefen–Alé
- 2016–2018: Team Colpack
- 2019: Arvedi Cycling

Professional team
- 2020–: Biesse–Arvedi
Medal record
Representing Italy
Men's track cycling
European Games
Silver medal – second place	2019 Minsk	Team pursuit

Carloalberto Giordani (born 24 October 1997) is an Italian professional racing cyclist, who currently rides for UCI Continental team Biesse–Carrera–Premac. He rode in the men's individual pursuit event at the 2017 UCI Track Cycling World Championships.
