= Eurocar GS Cycling Team =

Ukrainian cycling team

Team information
- UCI code: EGU (2021); EGS (2022)
- Registered: Ukraine
- Discipline: Road
- Status: UCI Continental (2021–2022)

Key personnel
- General manager: Aleksey Kasyanov

Team name history
- 2021 2022: Eurocar Grawe Ukraine; Eurocar GS Cycling Team

Eurocar GS Cycling Team was a UCI Continental team. The team registered with the UCI for the 2021 season. Although the team is a Ukrainian team it spends most of the season in Italy.

== Team roster ==
As of 31 December 2022.

Rider	Date of birth
Volodymyr Dzhus (UKR)	23 June 1993 (age 33)
Roman Gladysh (UKR)	12 October 1995 (age 30)
Pavlo Kobzar (UKR)	19 June 2003 (age 23)
Mykola Kravchuk (UKR)	27 May 2000 (age 26)
Yevhenii Kriachko (UKR)	13 March 2002 (age 24)
Andrii Movchan (UKR)	3 March 2002 (age 24)
Andriy Nizelskiy (UKR)	25 November 2002 (age 23)
Vitalii Novakovskyi (UKR)	16 April 1997 (age 29)
Oleksandr Smetaniuk (UKR)	29 December 2001 (age 24)
Serhii Sydor (UKR)	25 October 2002 (age 23)
Maksym Vasylyev (UKR)	14 April 1990 (age 36)
