= Alexander Dubchenko =

Russian cyclist (born 1995)

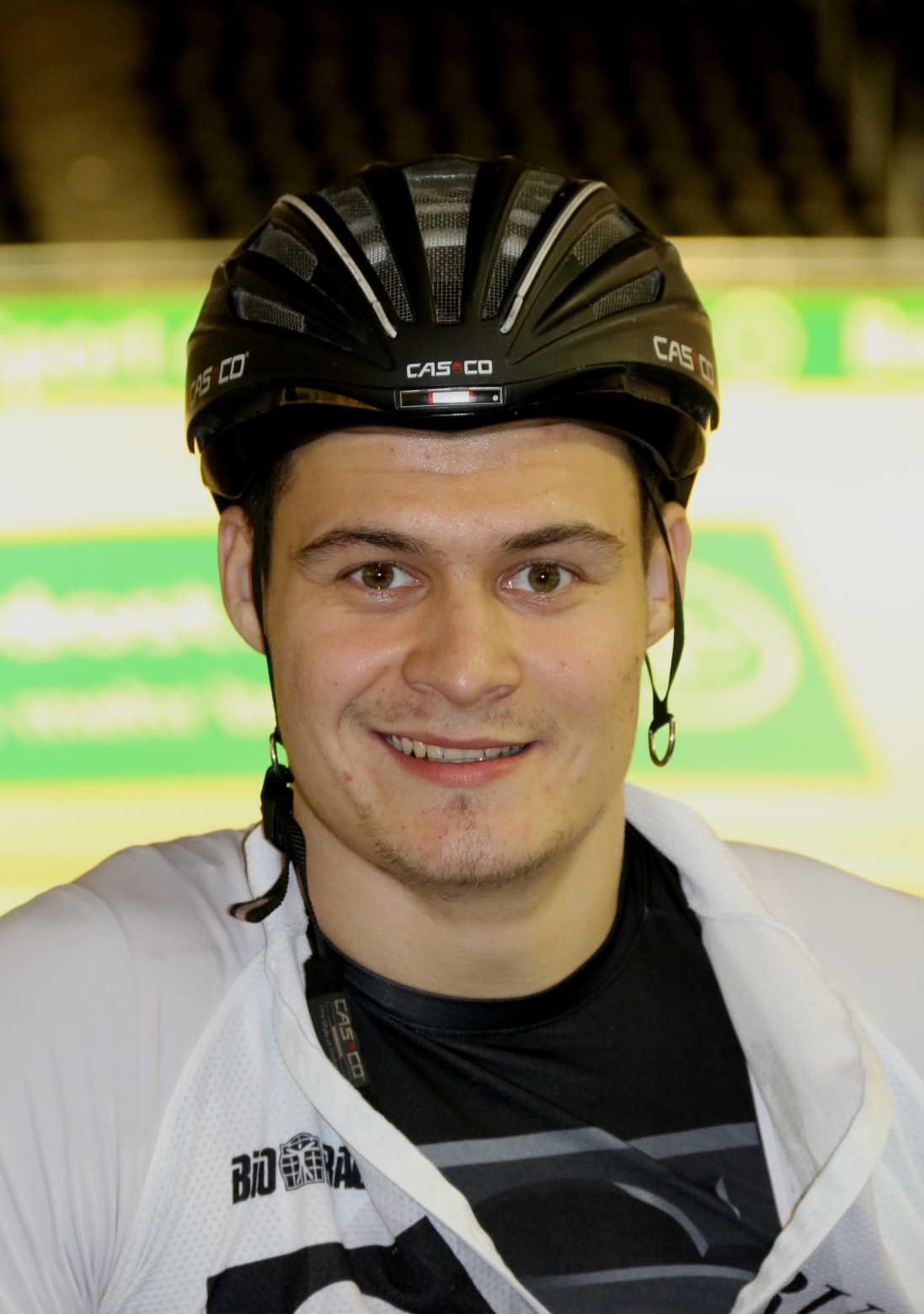

Personal information
- Born: 19 February 1995 (age 31)

Cycling career
- Sport: Cycling
- Discipline: Track cycling
Medal record
Men's track cycling
Representing Russia
European Championships
| Gold medal – first place | 2020 Plovdiv | Team pursuit |
Junior World Championships
| Gold medal – first place | 2012 Invercargill | Team sprint |
| Silver medal – second place | 2013 Glasgow | Team sprint |
| Silver medal – second place | 2013 Glasgow | 1km time trial |
| Bronze medal – third place | 2012 Invercargill | Keirin |
| Bronze medal – third place | 2013 Glasgow | Keirin |
U23 & Junior European Championships
| Gold medal – first place | 2013 Anadia | Junior 1km time trial |
| Gold medal – first place | 2013 Anadia | Junior Keirin |
| Silver medal – second place | 2012 Anadia | Junior Team sprint |
| Silver medal – second place | 2012 Anadia | Junior 1km time trial |
| Silver medal – second place | 2013 Anadia | Junior Team sprint |
| Silver medal – second place | 2014 Anadia | U23 1km time trial |
| Silver medal – second place | 2017 Sangalhos | U23 Team sprint |
| Bronze medal – third place | 2015 Athens | U23 Team sprint |

Alexander Dubchenko (born 19 February 1995) is a Russian male track cyclist, representing Russia at international competitions. He competed at the 2016 UEC European Track Championships in the 1 km time trial event.
