= Davide Plebani =

Italian cyclist (born 1996)

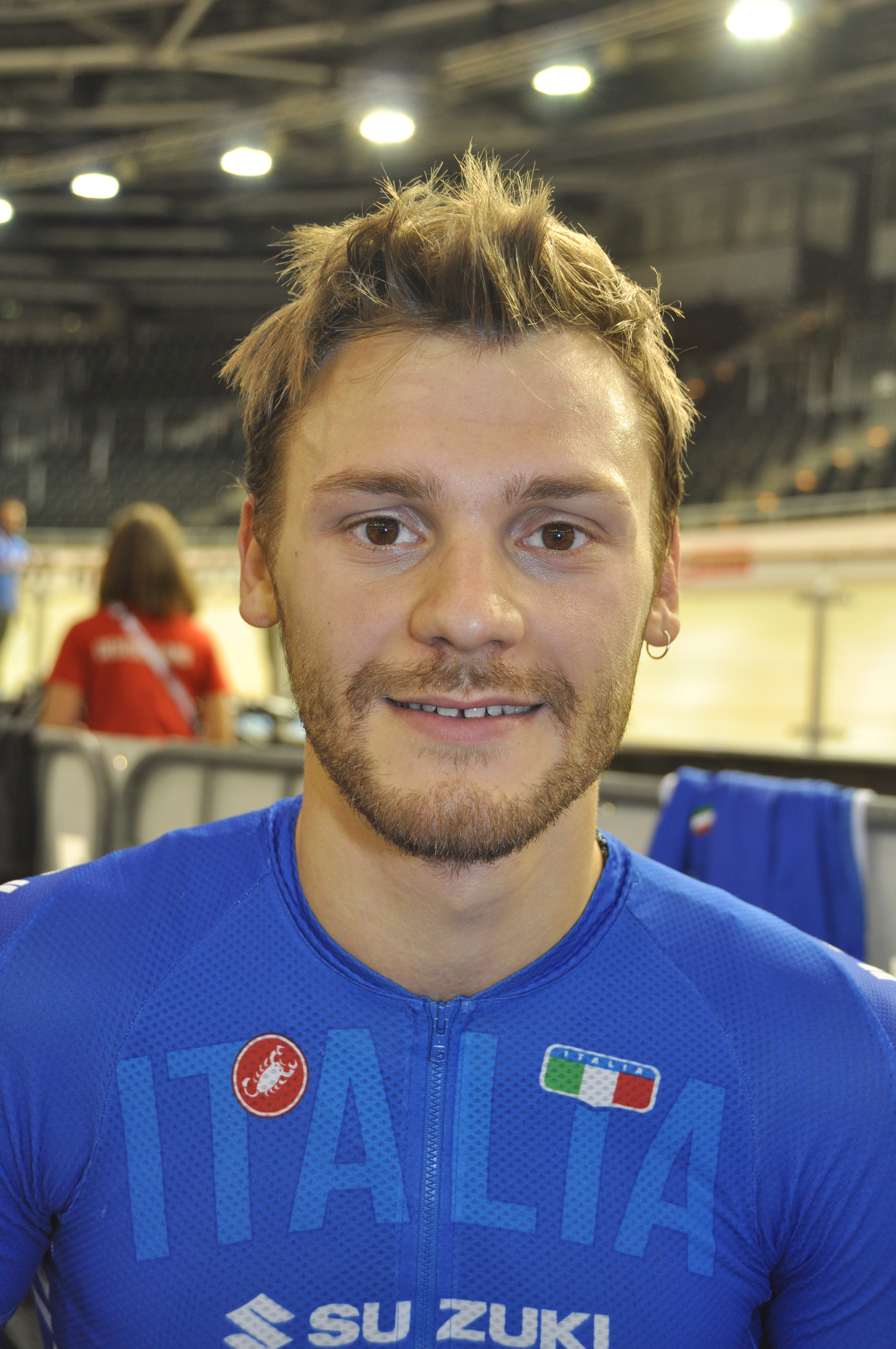
- Plebani in 2018

Personal information
- Full name: Davide Plebani
- Born: 24 July 1996 (age 30) Sarnico, Lombardy, Italy

Cycling career
- Sport: Cycling
- Disciplines: Track; Road; Gravel
- Role: Rider

Amateur teams
- 2017: Beltrami–Argon 18
- 2018: Team Colpack
- 2019: Arvedi Cycling
- 2021: Biesse–Arvedi

Professional teams
- 2015–2016: Unieuro–Wilier
- 2020: Biesse–Arvedi
- 2022: Work Service–Vitalcare–Vega
Medal record
Representing Italy
Men's track cycling
World Championships
Bronze medal – third place	2019 Pruszków	Individual pursuit
European Games
Silver medal – second place	2019 Minsk	Individual pursuit
Silver medal – second place	2019 Minsk	Team pursuit
European Championships
Silver medal – second place	2019 Apeldoorn	Team pursuit
Silver medal – second place	2022 Munich	Individual pursuit
Men's para-cycling
Paralympic Games
Bronze medal – third place	2024 Paris	Individual pursuit B

Davide Plebani (born 24 July 1996) is an Italian road and track cyclist, who most recently rode for UCI Continental team Work Service–Vitalcare–Vega. Representing Italy at international competitions, Plebani competed at the 2016 UEC European Track Championships in the elimination race event.

== Major results ==
2013
National Junior Track Championships

1st Madison
1st Team pursuit
1st Team sprint

2014
1st Road race, National Junior Road Championships
6th Road race, UEC European Junior Road Championships
2016
2nd Team pursuit, UEC European Under-23 Track Championships
3rd Team sprint, National Track Championships
2018
1st Team time trial, National Under-23 Road Championships
2019
European Games

2nd Individual pursuit
2nd Team pursuit

3rd Individual pursuit, UCI Track World Championships
2020
3rd Team relay, UEC European Road Championships
