= Ioannis Kalogeropoulos =

Greek cyclist (born 1994)

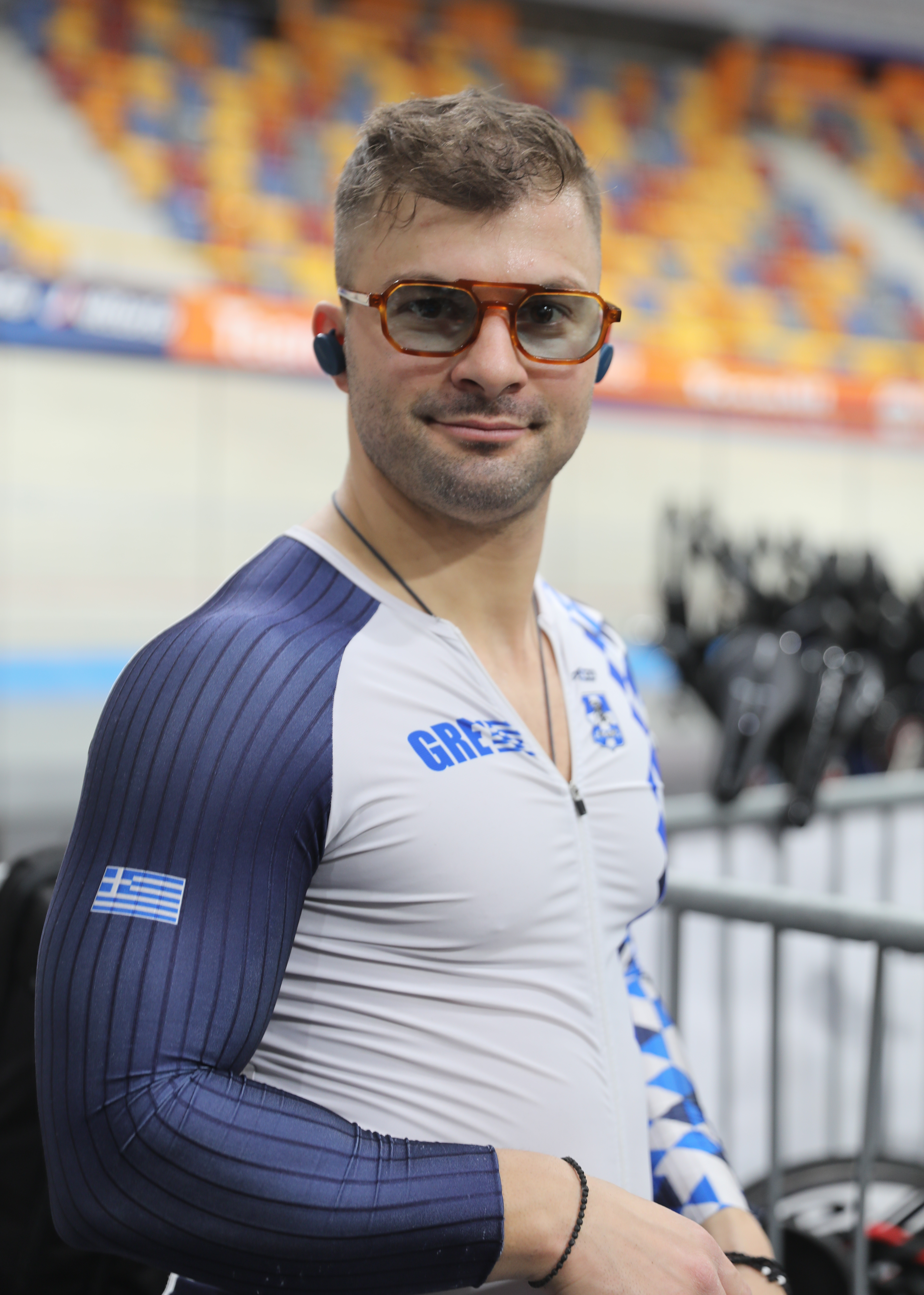
- Ioannis Kalogeropoulos (2024)

Personal information
- Nickname: Giannis
- Born: 11 January 1994 (age 32)
- Height: 1.66 m (5 ft 5 in)
- Weight: 80 kg (176 lb)

Cycling career
- Sport: Cycling
- Discipline: Track
- Role: Rider
- Rider type: Sprinter
Medal record
Men's track cycling
Representing Greece
European Championships
Bronze medal – third place	2020 Plovdiv	Team sprint

Ioannis Kalogeropoulos (born 11 January 1994) is a Greek track cyclist, who competes in sprinting events.
