= Dominik Bieler =

Swiss cyclist

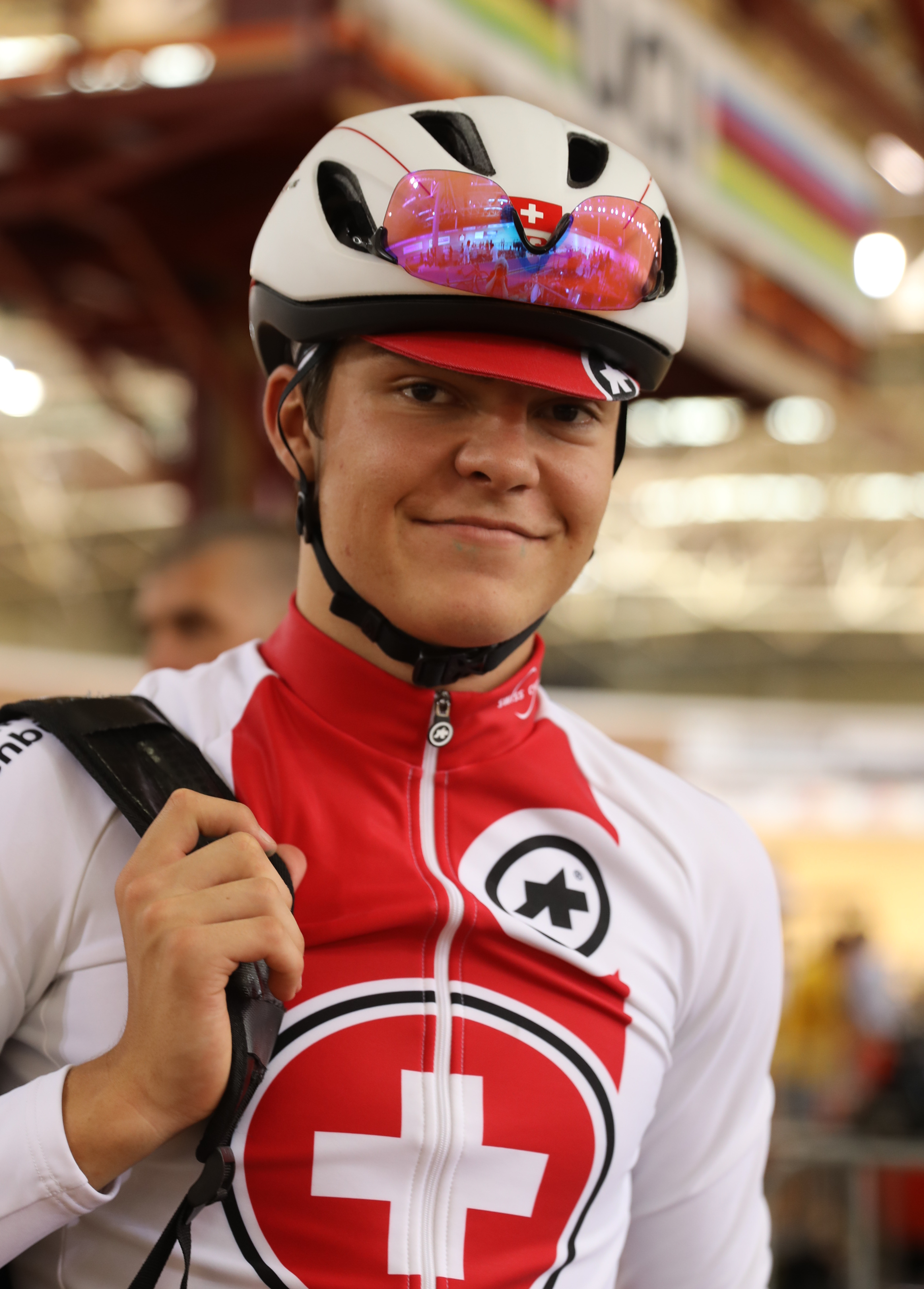
- Bieler in 2019

Personal information
- Born: 24 September 2001 (age 25)

Cycling career
- Sport: Cycling
- Disciplines: Road; Track
- Role: Rider

Amateur team
- 2019: Talent Romandie
Medal record
Representing Switzerland
Men's track cycling
European Championships
Bronze medal – third place	2020 Plovdiv	Team pursuit

Dominik Bieler (born 24 September 2001) is a Swiss racing cyclist, who competes on the road and track.

== Major results ==
2018
2nd Omnium, National Junior Track Championships
2019
2nd Road race, National Junior Road Championships
10th Trofeo Comune di Vertova
2020
3rd Team pursuit, UEC European Track Championships
