= Gidas Umbri =

Italian road and track cyclist

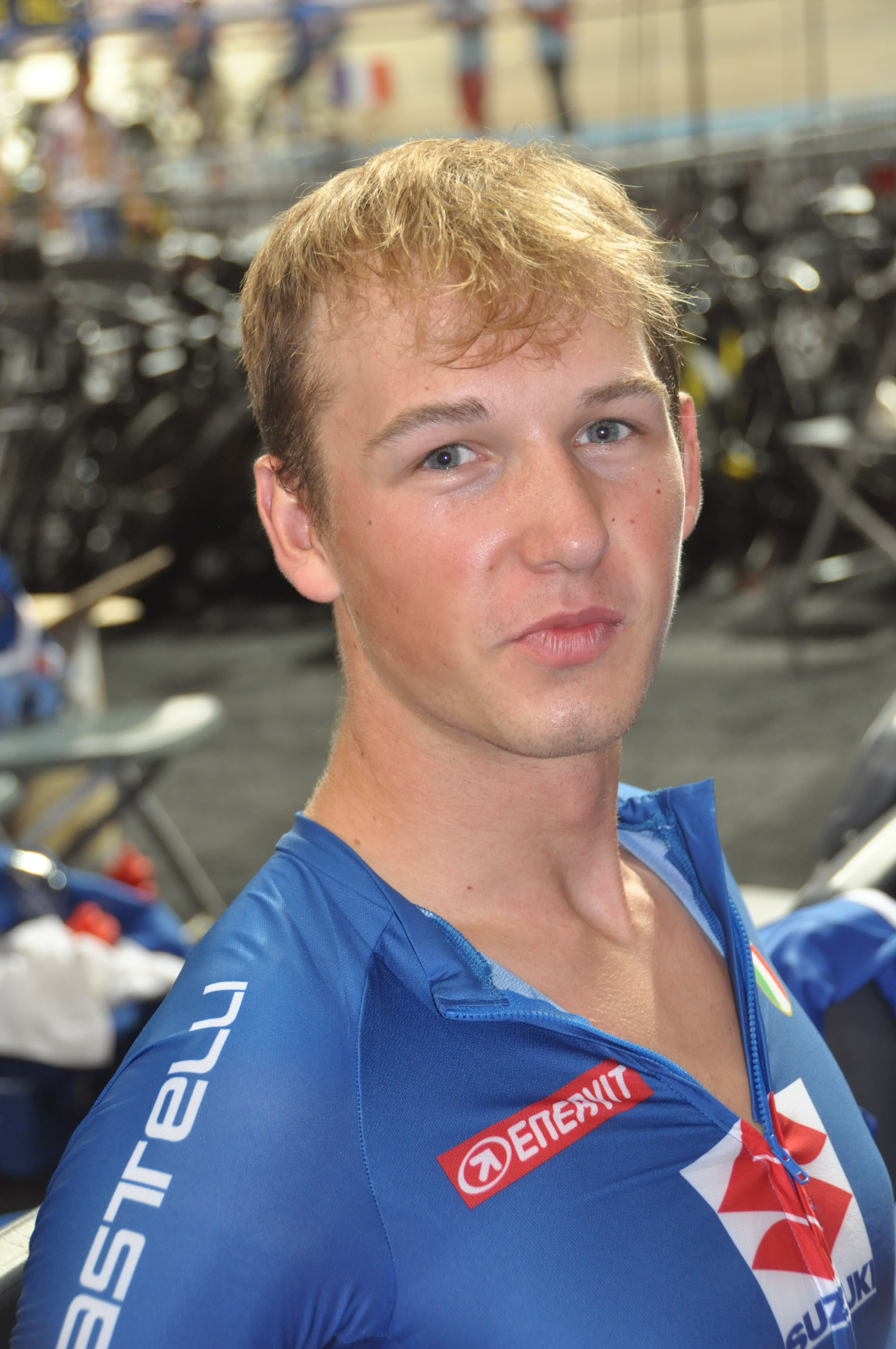
- Gidas Umbri (2021)

Personal information
- Born: 31 October 2001 (age 24)
- Height: 1.88 m (6 ft 2 in)

Cycling career
- Sport: Cycling
- Current team: MBH Bank CSB Telecom Fort
- Disciplines: Road; Track
- Role: Rider

Professional team
- 2020–: Team Colpack–Ballan
Medal record
Men's track cycling
Representing Italy
European Championships
Silver medal – second place	2020 Plovdiv	Team pursuit
U23 & Junior European Championships
Silver medal – second place	2020 Fiorenzuola	U23 Team pursuit

Gidas Umbri (born 31 October 2001) is an Italian road and track cyclist, who currently rides for UCI Continental team MBH Bank CSB Telecom Fort. He competed at the 2020 UEC European Track Championships in the team pursuit, where the Italian team finished second.

== Major results ==
2020
2nd Team pursuit, UEC European Track Championships
2nd Team pursuit, 2019–20 UCI Track Cycling World Cup, Milton
