= Maksym Vasylyev =

Ukrainian cyclist

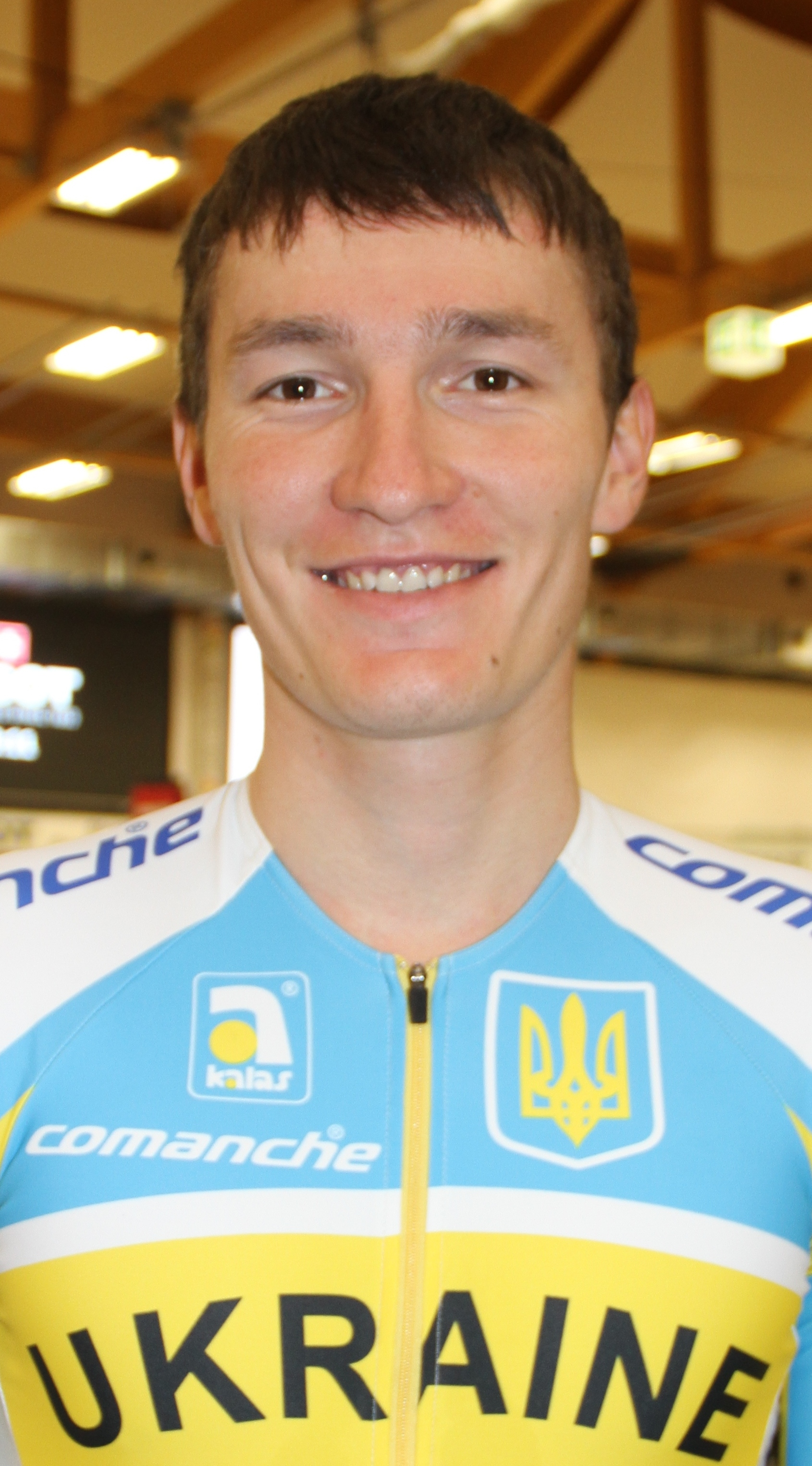
- Vasilyev in 2015.

Personal information
- Full name: Maksym Oleksandrovych Vasylyev
- Born: 14 April 1990 (age 36) Zavorychi, Soviet Union (now Ukraine)

Cycling career
- Sport: Cycling
- Current team: Eurocar GS Cycling Team
- Disciplines: Road; Track
- Role: Rider

Amateur team
- 2020: ISD Cycling Team

Professional teams
- 2009–2015: ISD Sport Donetsk
- 2016: Kolss BDC Team
- 2016–2017: Team Lvshan Landscape
- 2018: Lviv Cycling Team
- 2021– 2022: Eurocar–Grawe

Maksym Oleksandrovych Vasylyev (Ukrainian: Максим Олександрович Васильєв; born 14 April 1990) is a Ukrainian cyclist, who rode for UCI Continental team Eurocar GS Cycling Team from 2021 until 2022. He competed in the team pursuit at the 2014 UCI Track Cycling World Championships.

== Major results ==
2010
8th Mayor Cup
10th Overall Tour of Szeklerland
2011
1st Stage 2 Sibiu Cycling Tour
4th Overall Grand Prix of Sochi
2012
2nd Road race, National Road Championships
7th Jurmala Grand Prix
8th Overall Tour of Romania

1st Stage 3

10th Overall Tour d'Azerbaïdjan

1st Points classification

2013
6th Central European Tour Budapest GP
10th Central European Tour Košice–Miskolc
2014
1st Stage 6 Grand Prix of Sochi
7th Grand Prix of Moscow
8th Central European Tour Szerencs–Ibrány
10th Central European Tour Budapest GP
2015
3rd Grand Prix of ISD
4th Memorial Grundmanna I Wizowskiego
5th Race Horizon Park Classic
6th Korona Kocich Gór
2016
6th Overall Baltic Chain Tour
6th Belgrade–Banja Luka II
6th Grand Prix Minsk
8th Overall Tour of China I
9th Memoriał Romana Siemińskiego
9th Minsk Cup
2018
3rd Road race, National Road Championships
5th Race Horizon Park Classic
6th Race Horizon Park Maidan
9th Overall Tour of Cartier
9th Visegrad 4 Bicycle Race – GP Poland
