= Lev Gonov =

Russian cyclist (born 2000)

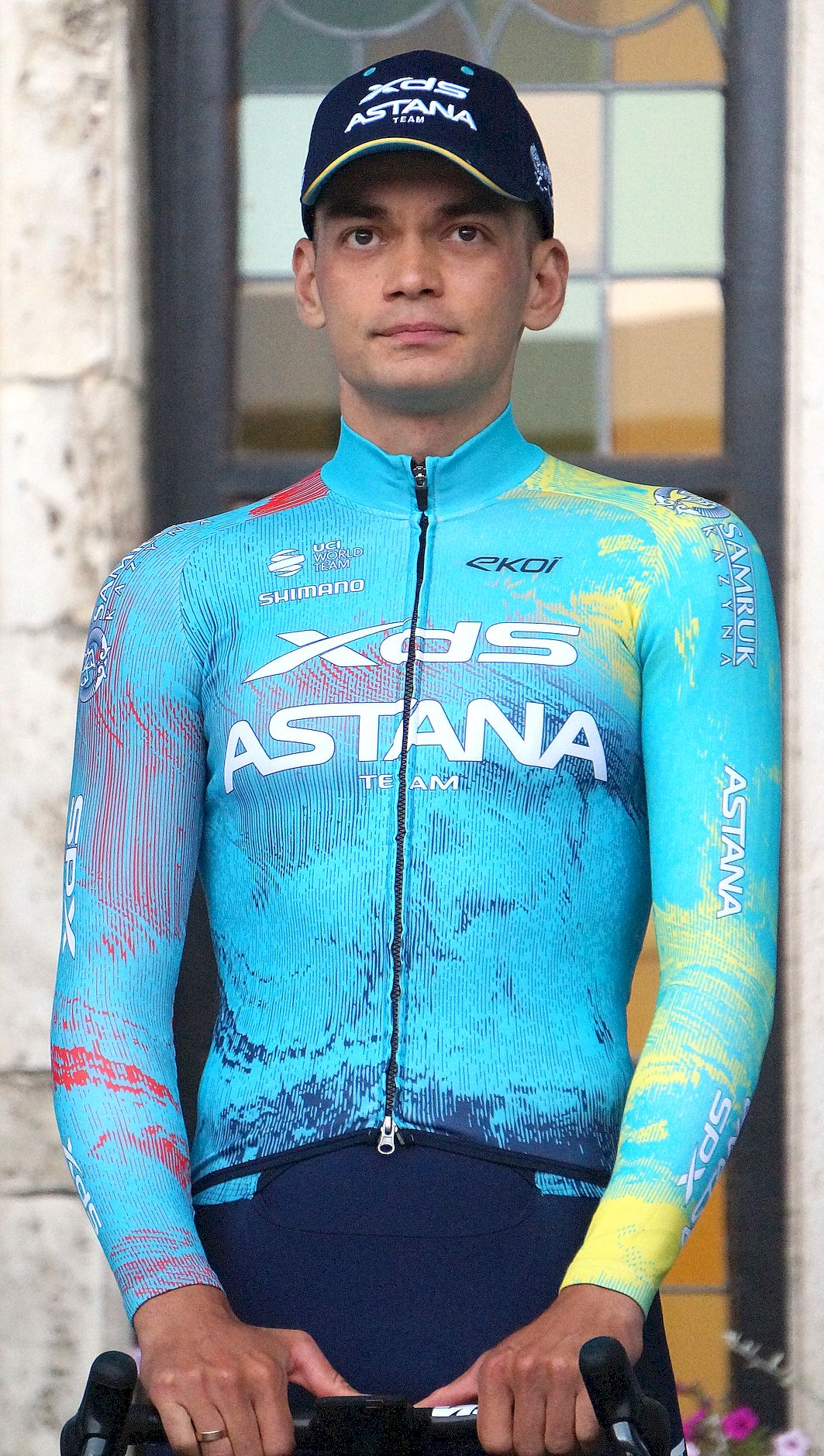

Personal information
- Full name: Lev Alekseyevich Gonov
- Born: 6 January 2000 (age 26)

Cycling career
- Sport: Cycling
- Current team: XDS Astana Development Team
- Disciplines: Track; Road
- Role: Rider

Amateur teams
- 2017–2018: Lokosphinx Junior
- 2019–2020: Lokosphinx Amateur
- 2022: CC Catalunya–Barcelona
- 2023–2024: PC Baix Ebre

Professional teams
- 2021: Lokosphinx
- 2024: Astana Qazaqstan Development Team (stagiaire)
- 2025: XDS Astana Development Team
- 2026–: XDS Astana Team
Medal record
Men's track cycling
Representing Individual Neutral Athletes
European Championships
Gold medal – first place	2026 Konya	Individual pursuit
Representing Russia
European Games
Gold medal – first place	2019 Minsk	Team pursuit
European Championships
Gold medal – first place	2020 Plovdiv	Team pursuit
Silver medal – second place	2021 Grenchen	Individual pursuit
Bronze medal – third place	2020 Plovdiv	Individual pursuit
Junior World Championships
Gold medal – first place	2017 Montichiari	Team pursuit
Gold medal – first place	2018 Aigle	Individual pursuit
Silver medal – second place	2017 Montichiari	Madison
Silver medal – second place	2018 Aigle	Madison
Bronze medal – third place	2017 Montichiari	Individual pursuit
U23 & Junior European Championships
Gold medal – first place	2017 Sangalhos	Junior Team pursuit
Gold medal – first place	2019 Ghent	U23 Team pursuit
Gold medal – first place	2020 Fiorenzuola	U23 Team pursuit
Gold medal – first place	2020 Fiorenzuola	U23 Madison
Bronze medal – third place	2018 Aigle	U23 Team pursuit
Bronze medal – third place	2019 Ghent	U23 Individual pursuit
Bronze medal – third place	2020 Fiorenzuola	U23 Individual pursuit

Lev Alekseyevich Gonov (Russian: Лев Алексеевич Гонов; born 6 January 2000) is a Russian road and track cyclist, who currently rides for UCI WorldTeam XDS Astana Team.

== Major results ==
=== Track ===
2017
UCI Junior World Championships

1st Team pursuit (with Gleb Syritsa, Ivan Smirnov & Dmitry Mukhomediarov)
2nd Madison
3rd Individual pursuit

1st Team pursuit, UEC European Junior Championships (with Gleb Syritsa, Ivan Smirnov & Dmitry Mukhomediarov)
UCI World Cup

3rd Team pursuit, Pruszkow
3rd Team pursuit, Minsk

2nd Team pursuit, National Track Championships
2018
UCI Junior World Championships

1st Individual pursuit
2nd Madison

1st Team pursuit, National Championships (with Gleb Syritsa, Ivan Smirnov and Alexander Evtushenko)
3rd Team pursuit, UEC European Under-23 Championships
2019
1st Team pursuit, European Games
UEC European Under-23 Championships

1st Team pursuit
3rd Individual pursuit

2020
UEC European Championships

1st Team pursuit
3rd Individual pursuit

UEC European Under-23 Championships

1st Madison (with Ivan Smirnov)
1st Team pursuit
3rd Individual pursuit

National Championships

1st Individual pursuit
1st Madison (with Ivan Smirnov)
1st Team pursuit

2021
UCI Nations Cup

1st Team pursuit, Saint Petersburg
1st Madison, Saint Petersburg (with Ivan Smirnov)

1st Team pursuit, National Championships
2nd Individual pursuit, UEC European Championships
2023
3rd Six Days of Fiorenzuola (with Ivan Smirnov)
2024
1st Six Days of Fiorenzuola (with Ivan Smirnov)

=== Road ===
2018
4th Overall Trophée Centre Morbihan
2019 (1 pro win)
7th Overall Tour of Fuzhou

1st Stage 5

2020
4th Time trial, National Championships
4th Grand Prix World's Best High Altitude
6th Grand Prix Cappadocia
2021
5th Time trial, UEC European Under-23 Championships
2023
1st Prologue Five Rings of Moscow
2nd Time trial, National Championships
2024
1st Overall Tour of Szeklerland

1st Points classification
1st Prologue

1st Overall Five Rings of Moscow

1st Prologue

1st Trofeo Guerrita
1st Trofeu Festes del Tura
2nd Time trial, National Championships
2nd Coppa Caduti di Reda
5th Milano–Rapallo
7th Gran Premio San José
2025 (1)
1st Stage 3 Tour of Turkey
3rd La Popolarissima
9th GP Slovenian Istria
10th GP Adria Mobil
