= Hardzei Tsishchanka =

Belarusian cyclist (born 1995)

Personal information
- Born: 16 August 1995 (age 31) Rechytsa, Belarus

Cycling career
- Sport: Cycling
- Current team: BelAZ
- Disciplines: Road; Track
- Role: Rider

Amateur team
- 2018: RCOP Belarus

Professional teams
- 2015: Minsk
- 2021–: BelAZ

Hardzei Tsishchanka (Belarusian: Гардзей Цішчанка; born 16 August 1995) is a Belarusian professional racing cyclist, who currently rides for UCI Continental team BelAZ. He rode at the 2015 UCI Track Cycling World Championships.

== Major results ==
2014
1st Team pursuit, National Track Championships
2016
1st Team pursuit, National Track Championships
2017
1st Team sprint, National Track Championships
3rd Time trial, National Under-23 Road Championships
2019
1st Team pursuit, National Track Championships
