= 2026 UEC European Track Championships – Women's 1 km time trial =

Women's 1 km time trial at the 2026 UEC Track Elite European Championships
- Venue: Konya Velodrome, Konya
- Date: 4 February
- Competitors: 19
- Winning time: 1:03.682

Medalists
gold medal	Mathilde Gros	France
silver medal	Miriam Vece	Italy
bronze medal	Yana Burlakova

The women's 1 km time trial competition at the 2026 UEC European Track Championships was held on 4 February 2026.

== Results ==
=== Qualifying ===
The top 8 riders qualified for the final.

Rank	Name	Nation	Time	Behind	Notes
1	Mathilde Gros	France	1:03.328		Q
2	Hetty van de Wouw	Netherlands	1:03.340	+0.012	Q
3	Yana Burlakova	Individual Neutral Athletes	1:03.621	+0.293	Q
4	Sophie Capewell	Great Britain	1:03.681	+0.353	Q
5	Miriam Vece	Italy	1:03.708	+0.380	Q
6	Ekaterina Evlanova	Individual Neutral Athletes	1:04.260	+0.932	Q
7	Steffie van der Peet	Netherlands	1:04.505	+1.177	Q
8	Veronika Jaborníková	Czech Republic	1:04.732	+1.404	Q
9	Clara Schneider	Germany	1:05.709	+2.381	
10	Anna Jaborníková	Czech Republic	1:06.588	+3.260	
11	Hanna Tserakh	Individual Neutral Athletes	1:06.639	+3.311	
12	Zita Gheysens	Belgium	1:06.906	+3.578	
13	Alla Biletska	Ukraine	1:07.207	+3.879	
14	Emma Jeffers	Ireland	1:07.229	+3.901	
15	Helena Casas	Spain	1:07.299	+3.971	
16	Matilde Cenci	Italy	1:07.330	+4.002	
17	Erin Creighton	Ireland	1:07.435	+4.107	
18	Varvara Basiakova	Individual Neutral Athletes	1:07.636	+4.308	
19	Kate Richardson	Great Britain	1:07.834	+4.506	

=== Final ===
Rank	Name	Nation	Time	Behind	Notes
1st place, gold medalist(s)	Mathilde Gros	France	1:03.682		
2nd place, silver medalist(s)	Miriam Vece	Italy	1:04.106	+0.424	
3rd place, bronze medalist(s)	Yana Burlakova	Individual Neutral Athletes	1:04.171	+0.489	
4	Sophie Capewell	Great Britain	1:04.806	+1.124	
5	Steffie van der Peet	Netherlands	1:04.925	+1.243	
6	Ekaterina Evlanova	Individual Neutral Athletes	1:05.149	+1.467	
7	Veronika Jaborníková	Czech Republic	1:05.281	+1.599	
8	Hetty van de Wouw	Netherlands	Did not start		
