= Yauheni Akhramenka =

Belarusian cyclist (born 1995)

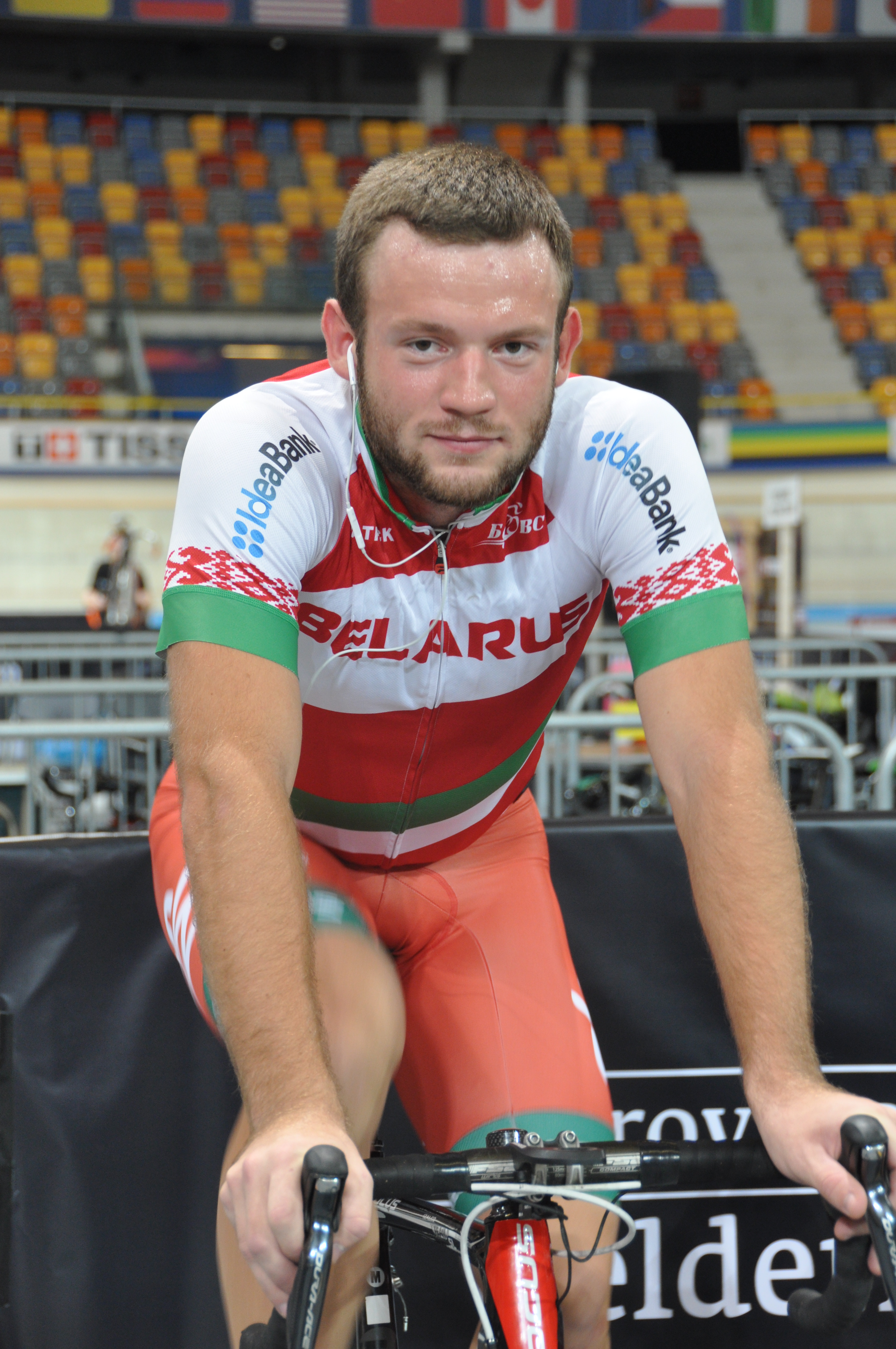

Personal information
- Born: 30 June 1995 (age 31) Zhlobin, Belarus

Cycling career
- Sport: Cycling
- Current team: BelAZ
- Disciplines: Road; Track
- Role: Rider
- Rider type: Pursuitist (track)

Amateur team
- 2017: Minsk Cycling Club (stagiaire)

Professional teams
- 2019: Ferei Pro Cycling
- 2021–: BelAZ

Yauheni Akhramenka (born 30 June 1995) is a Belarusian professional racing cyclist, who currently rides for UCI Continental team BelAZ. He rode at the 2015 UCI Track Cycling World Championships.

== Major results ==
2012
2nd Team pursuit, National Track Championships
2013
2nd Under-23 points race, Mexico Copa Internacional de Pista
2014
1st Madison, National Track Championships
2015
1st Individual pursuit, Panevezys
2016
1st Team pursuit, Grand Prix Minsk
2017
National Track Championships

1st Team pursuit
2nd Madison
2nd Points race

2nd Time trial, National Under-23 Road Championships
