= Nikita Bersenev =

Russian cyclist (born 2000)

Personal information
- Full name: Nikita Yuryevich Bersenev
- Born: 25 March 2000 (age 26)

Cycling career
- Sport: Cycling
- Current team: Lokosphinx
- Disciplines: Track; Road
- Role: Rider

Amateur teams
- 2018: Lokosphinx Junior
- 2019–2020: Lokosphinx Amateur

Professional team
- 2021–: Lokosphinx
Medal record
Men's track cycling
Representing Russia
European Games
Gold medal – first place	2019 Minsk	Team pursuit
European Championships
Gold medal – first place	2020 Plovdiv	Team pursuit
U23 & Junior European Championships
Gold medal – first place	2020 Fiorenzuola	U23 Team pursuit
Bronze medal – third place	2018 Aigle	Junior Individual pursuit

Nikita Yuryevich Bersenev (Russian: Никита Юрьевич Берсенев; born 25 March 2000) is a Russian road and track cyclist, who currently rides for UCI Continental team Lokosphinx.

== Major results ==
2018
3rd Individual pursuit, UEC European Under-23 Track Championships
2019
1st Team pursuit, European Games
National Track Championships

1st Team pursuit
3rd Scratch

2020
1st Team pursuit, UEC European Track Championships
1st Team pursuit, UEC European Under-23 Track Championships
1st Team pursuit, National Track Championships
10th Grand Prix Develi
