= Volodymyr Dzhus (cyclist) =

Ukrainian cyclist (born 1993)

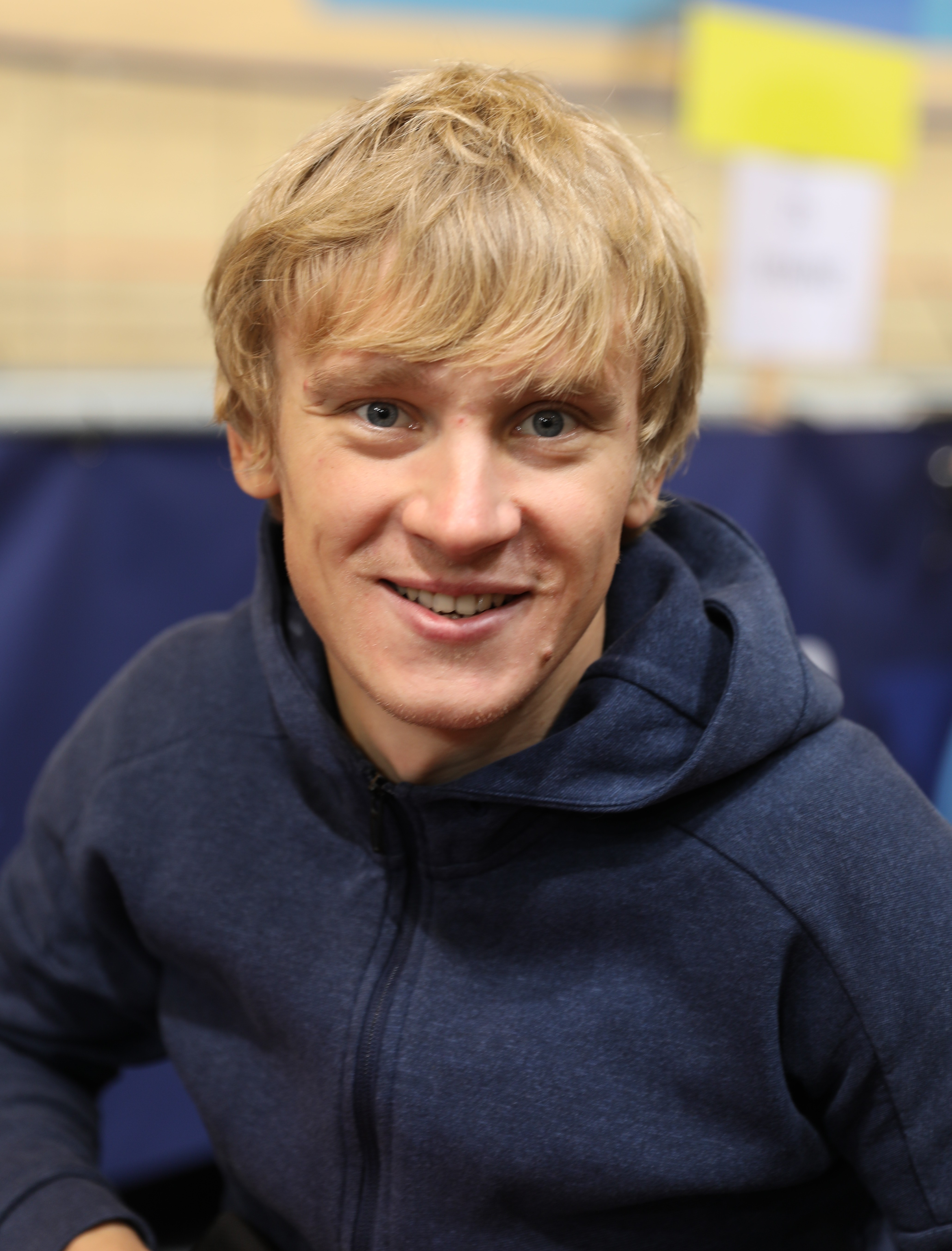
- Dzhus in 2019

Personal information
- Full name: Volodymyr Dzhus
- Born: 23 June 1993 (age 33) Donetsk, Ukraine

Cycling career
- Sport: Cycling
- Current team: Eurocar GS Cycling Team
- Disciplines: Road; Track
- Role: Rider

Amateur team
- 2020: ISD Cycling Team

Professional teams
- 2012–2015: ISD–Lampre Continental
- 2016: Kolss BDC Team
- 2017: ISD–Jorbi
- 2018–2019: Lviv Cycling Team
- 2021–: Eurocar–Grawe

Volodymyr Dzhus (Ukrainian: Володимир Джус; born 23 June 1993) is a Ukrainian professional racing cyclist, who currently rides for UCI Continental team Eurocar GS Cycling Team. He rode at the 2014, 2015, 2020 and 2021 UCI Track Cycling World Championships.

== Major results ==
=== Road ===
2012
7th Overall Tour d'Azerbaïdjan
2015
4th Horizon Park Classic
8th Grand Prix of ISD
2016
6th Time trial, National Road Championships
2018
2nd Horizon Park Classic
6th Time trial, National Road Championships
2019
2nd Odessa Grand Prix

=== Track ===
2014
2nd Individual pursuit, National Championships
2017
National Championships

1st Individual pursuit
1st Team pursuit

2018
National Championships

2nd Madison
2nd Team pursuit

2019
National Championships

1st Individual pursuit
2nd Team pursuit
