= Kolodruma =

Velodrome and multifunctional indoor arena in Plovdiv, Bulgaria

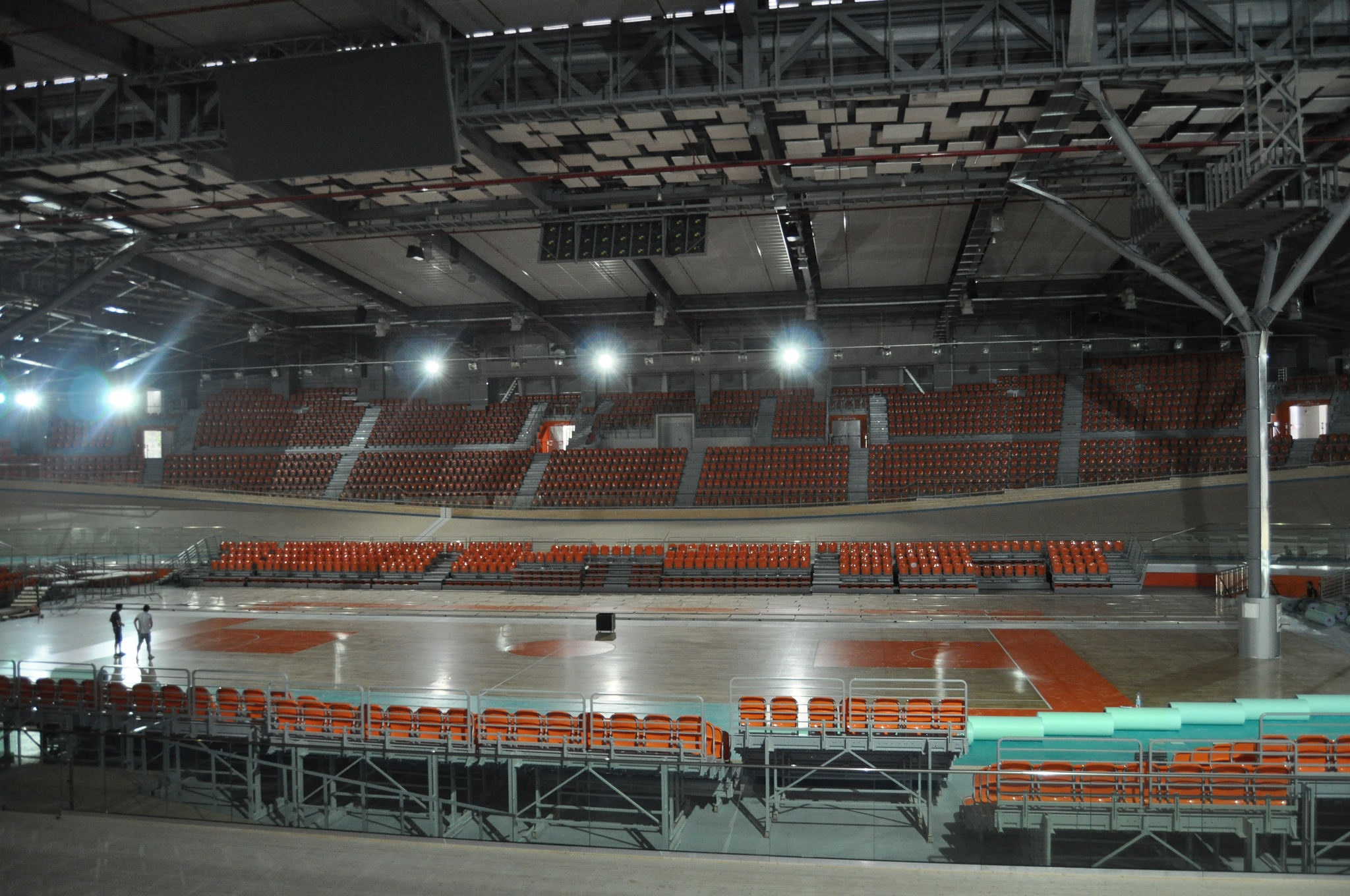
- Interactive map of Kolodruma
- Full name: Multifunctional sports hall Kolodruma
- Location: Naycho Tsanov Blvd., Plovdiv, Bulgaria
- Coordinates: 42°07′41″N 24°46′00″E
- Capacity: Cycling: 4,800; Volleyball, basketball, handball, football: 6,100; Concerts: 7,500
- Surface: Parquet

Construction
- Groundbreaking: 2007
- Opened: 30 August 2015
- Cost: BGN ~60 million
- Architect: Sander Douma
- Main contractor: Metalstroy AMS Ltd

Tenants
- Plovdiv Cycling Club "Tsar Simeon 1898"; VC Maritsa Plovdiv

Kolodruma (Bulgarian: Колодрума) is a velodrome and a multifunctional indoor arena located in Plovdiv, Bulgaria. It has a seating capacity of 4,800 to 7,500 spectators depending on its use. It is built on the place of the former track cycling velodrome in Plovdiv and currently is the only indoor velodrome in Bulgaria.

Besides cycling events the arena can host additional 22 types of sports and can serve as concert's hall. The complex has also underground parking facility for 300 vehicles, a modern press centre, dressing rooms, coaching facilities, a sports-recreational centre, restaurants and a large commercial centre for a wide variety of sports merchandise and kit.

== Construction ==
The architect of the project is the Dutch Sander Douma, who has previously created the largest-known velodromes in Europe, notably the facilities in Athens, Monte Carlo, Palma de Majorca, and Manchester amongst others.

The arena was officially opened on 30 August 2015 by the presence of numerous government officials and Bulgarian sports celebrities.

== List of major concerts ==
- Chris Norman – 19 October 2015
- Vasko Vasilev – 29 September 2016
- Dire Straits – 3 December 2016
- Ambrogio Maestri – 18 December 2016
- Lepa Brena – 8 April 2017
- One love tour – 8 September 2017
- Philipp Kirkorov – 24 September 2017
- 16 years Planeta TV – 28 November 2017
- Let's support the future of Bulgaria – 19 October 2018
- Music awards of BG radio – 22 May 2019
- Stefan Valdobrev and Obichainite zapodozreni – 23 October 2019
- Skandau – 26 October 2019
- Bryan Adams – 14 November 2019
- 18 years Planeta TV – 3 December 2019
- Richard Clayderman – 29 May 2021
- Music awards of BG radio – 17 July 2021
- Music awards of BG radio – 10 June 2022
- Music awards of BG radio – 27 May 2023
- Sofi Marinova and Ku-Ku Band – 6 June 2023
- Lara Fabian – 27 April 2024
- Music awards of BG radio – 26 May 2024
- Gülşen – 31 May 2024

== List of major sporting events ==
- ITF Taekwon-Do World Championship – August 2015
- 2016 Men's U20 Volleyball European Championship
- 2017 Bulgarian Basketball Cup
- 2018 FIVB Volleyball Men's World Championship
- 2020 UEC European Track Championships
- Fifth round of "SESAME Tournaments of the willpower" – April 12, 2025

== See also ==
- List of cycling tracks and velodromes
- List of indoor arenas in Bulgaria
