= 2020–21 UCI Track Cycling season =

International cycling contest

Details
- Dates: 30 July 2020 – 28 November
- Location: World
- Races: 13

The 2020–21 UCI Track Cycling season is the sixteenth season of the UCI Track Cycling season. The 2020–21 season began on 30 July 2020 with the Sei Giorni delle Rose and will end in October 2021. It is organised by the Union Cycliste Internationale.

== Events ==
=== 2020 ===
Event	Race	Winner	Second	Third
23à Sei Giorni delle Rose - Fiorenzuola 2020; Italy 30 July–4 August	Sprint	Sotirios Bretas (GRE); Miriam Vece (ITA)	Tom Derache (FRA); Tania Calvo (ESP)	Matteo Bianchi (ITA); Elena Bissolati (ITA)
23à Sei Giorni delle Rose - Fiorenzuola 2020; Italy 30 July–4 August	Time Trial	Francesco Lamon (ITA)	Sotirios Bretas (GRE)	Matteo Bianchi (ITA)
23à Sei Giorni delle Rose - Fiorenzuola 2020; Italy 30 July–4 August	Omnium	Benjamin Thomas (FRA); Elisa Balsamo (ITA)	Théry Schir (SUI); Kirsten Wild (NED)	Jan-Willem van Schip (NED); Maria Giulia Confalonieri (ITA)
23à Sei Giorni delle Rose - Fiorenzuola 2020; Italy 30 July–4 August	Points Race	Benjamin Thomas (FRA); Daria Pikulik (POL)	Théry Schir (SUI); Kirsten Wild (NED)	Jan-Willem van Schip (NED); Vittoria Guazzini (ITA)
23à Sei Giorni delle Rose - Fiorenzuola 2020; Italy 30 July–4 August	Scratch	Benjamin Thomas (FRA)	Daniel Babor (CZE)	Maximilian Beyer (GER)
23à Sei Giorni delle Rose - Fiorenzuola 2020; Italy 30 July–4 August	Madison	Davide Plebani (ITA)/Stefano Moro (ITA); Elisa Balsamo (ITA)/Maria Giulia Confalonieri (ITA)	Francesco Lamon (ITA)/Michele Scartezzini (ITA); Kirsten Wild (NED)/Amy Pieters (NED)	Yoeri Havik (NED)/Jan-Willem van Schip (NED); Chiara Consonni (ITA)/Vittoria Guazzini (ITA)
4° International Piceno Sprint Cup; Italy 7–8 August	Sprint	Sotirios Bretas (GRE); Miriam Vece (ITA)	Robin Wagner (CZE); Elena Bissolati (ITA)	Martin Čechman (CZE); Sára Kaňkovská (CZE)
4° International Piceno Sprint Cup; Italy 7–8 August	Keirin	Sotirios Bretas (GRE)	Jakub Šťastný (CZE)	Ainārs Ķiksis (LVA)
4° International Piceno Sprint Cup; Italy 7–8 August	Time Trial	Tomáš Bábek (CZE)	Francesco Ceci (ITA)	Matteo Bianchi (ITA)
4° International Piceno Sprint Cup; Italy 7–8 August	Omnium	Francesco Lamon (ITA); Kirsten Wild (NED)	Roy Eefting (NED); Rachele Barbieri (ITA)	Christos Volikakis (GRE); Martina Fidanza (ITA)
4° International Piceno Sprint Cup; Italy 7–8 August	Points Race	Yoeri Havik (NED); Kirsten Wild (NED)	Roy Eefting (NED); Giorgia Fraiegari (ITA)	Christos Volikakis (GRE); Eukene Larrarte Arteaga (ESP)
4° International Piceno Sprint Cup; Italy 7–8 August	Scratch	Roy Eefting (NED); Kirsten Wild (NED)	Liam Bertazzo (ITA); Rachele Barbieri (ITA)	Joffrey Degueurce (FRA); Tania Calvo (ESP)
4 Sere Internazionale Città di Pordenone; Italy 11–14 August	Omnium	Liam Bertazzo (ITA)	Francesco Lamon (ITA)	Denis Rugovac (CZE)
4 Sere Internazionale Città di Pordenone; Italy 11–14 August	Elimination Race	Elisa Balsamo (ITA)	Vittoria Guazzini (ITA)	Rachele Barbieri (ITA)
4 Sere Internazionale Città di Pordenone; Italy 11–14 August	Points Race	Davide Plebani (ITA); Vittoria Guazzini (ITA)	Matteo Donegà (ITA); Chiara Consonni (ITA)	Nicolas Pietrula (CZE); Giorgia Catarzi (ITA)
4 Sere Internazionale Città di Pordenone; Italy 11–14 August	Scratch	Elia Viviani (ITA)	Stefano Moro (ITA)	Filippo Ferronato (ITA)
4 Sere Internazionale Città di Pordenone; Italy 11–14 August	Madison	Davide Plebani (ITA)/Stefano Moro (ITA); Vittoria Guazzini (ITA)/Elisa Balsamo (ITA)	Filippo Ferronato (ITA)/Matteo Donegà (ITA); Martina Fidanza (ITA)/Rachele Barbieri (ITA)	Yoeri Havik (NED)/Roy Eefting (NED); Kateřina Kohoutková (CZE)/Petra Ševčíková (CZE)
GP Czech Cycling Federation-VC Olomouckého kraje Czech Republic 25–26 August	Sprint	Mateusz Rudyk (POL); Urszula Łoś (POL)	Maciej Bielecki (POL); Nikola Seremak (POL)	Rafał Sarnecki (POL); Nikola Sibiak (POL)
GP Czech Cycling Federation-VC Olomouckého kraje Czech Republic 25–26 August	Keirin	Mateusz Rudyk (POL); Nikola Seremak (POL)	Tomáš Bábek (CZE); Urszula Łoś (POL)	Martin Čechman (CZE); Paulina Petri (POL)
GP Czech Cycling Federation-VC Olomouckého kraje Czech Republic 25–26 August	Omnium	Matias Malmberg (DEN); Daria Pikulik (POL)	Matteo Donegà (ITA); Karolina Karasiewicz (POL)	Philip Heijnen (NED); Nikol Płosaj (POL)
GP Czech Cycling Federation-VC Olomouckého kraje Czech Republic 25–26 August	Points Race	Nicolas Pietrula (CZE); Daria Pikulik (POL)	Joffrey Degueurce (FRA); Gudrun Stock (GER)	Vincent Hoppezak (NED); Laura Süßemilch (GER)
GP Czech Cycling Federation-VC Olomouckého kraje Czech Republic 25–26 August	Scratch	Bartosz Rudyk (POL); Daria Pikulik (POL)	Philip Heijnen (NED); Lena Charlotte Reißner (GER)	Filippo Ferronato (ITA); Wiktoria Pikulik (POL)
GP Czech Cycling Federation-VC Olomouckého kraje Czech Republic 25–26 August	Madison	Frederik Wandahl (DEN)/Matias Malmberg (DEN); Daria Pikulik (POL)/Wiktoria Pikulik (POL)	Jan Kraus (CZE)/Nicolas Pietrula (CZE); Gudrun Stock (GER)/Lena Charlotte Reißner (GER)	Yacine Chalel (ALG)/Didier Baptiste (FRA); Karolina Karasiewicz (POL)/Patrycja Lorkowska (POL)
Grand Prix of Tula; Russia 27–29 August	Sprint	Mikhail Yakovlev (RUS); Anastasia Voynova (RUS)	Denis Dmitriev (RUS); Yana Tyshchenko (RUS)	Danila Burlakov (RUS); Daria Shmeleva (RUS)
Grand Prix of Tula; Russia 27–29 August	Keirin	Mikhail Yakovlev (RUS); Anastasia Voynova (RUS)	Denis Dmitriev (RUS); Daria Shmeleva (RUS)	Ivan Gladyshev (RUS); Elena Brejniva (RUS)
Grand Prix of Tula; Russia 27–29 August	Points Race	Savva Novikov (RUS); Gulnaz Khatuntseva (RUS)	Ivan Gerasimov (RUS); Maria Averina (RUS)	Victor Podoynikov (RUS); Maria Rostovtseva (RUS)
Grand Prix of Tula; Russia 27–29 August	Scratch	Sergey Rostovtsev (RUS); Maria Averina (RUS)	Victor Podoynikov (RUS); Elena Brejniva (RUS)	Vladimir Ilchenko (RUS); Maria Rostovtseva (RUS)
Grand Prix of Tula; Russia 27–29 August	Team Sprint	Russia (RUS); Daniil Komkov; Dmitry Nesterov; Alexander Dubchenko; Russia (RUS); Yana Tyshchenko; Anastasia Voynova	Russia (RUS); Mikhail Dmitriev; Denis Dmitriev; Alexander Sharapov; Russia (RUS); Ekaterina Rogovaya; Daria Shmeleva	Russia (RUS); Ivan Gladyshev; Danila Burlakov; Mikhail Yakovlev; Russia (RUS); Natalia Antonova; Ekaterina Gnidenko
Grand Prix of Tula; Russia 27–29 August	Madison	Sergey Rostovtsev (RUS)/Savva Novikov (RUS); Maria Averina (RUS)/Gulnaz Khatuntseva (RUS)	Aleksandr Shakotko (RUS)/Ivan Gerasimov (RUS); Galina Streltsova (RUS)/Maria Rostovtseva (RUS)	Sergey Zatsepin (RUS)/Vladimir Ilchenko (RUS); Victoria Sviridova (RUS)/Irina Murzina (RUS)
GP Prostejov - Memorial of Otmar Malecek; Czech Republic 28–29 August	Sprint	Martin Čechman (CZE); Urszula Łoś (POL)	Tomáš Bábek (CZE); Marlena Karwacka (POL)	David Sojka (CZE); Nikola Sibiak (POL)
GP Prostejov - Memorial of Otmar Malecek; Czech Republic 28–29 August	Keirin	Martin Čechman (CZE); Urszula Łoś (POL)	Tomáš Bábek (CZE); Sára Kaňkovská (CZE)	David Sojka (CZE); Paulina Petri (POL)
GP Prostejov - Memorial of Otmar Malecek; Czech Republic 28–29 August	Omnium	Francesco Lamon (ITA); Daria Pikulik (POL)	Matias Malmberg (DEN); Karolina Karasiewicz (POL)	Daniel Staniszewski (POL); Nikol Płosaj (POL)
GP Prostejov - Memorial of Otmar Malecek; Czech Republic 28–29 August	Points Race	Wiktoria Pikulik (POL)	Lena Charlotte Reißner (GER)	Nikol Płosaj (POL)
GP Prostejov - Memorial of Otmar Malecek; Czech Republic 28–29 August	Scratch	Philip Heijnen (NED); Daria Pikulik (POL)	Damian Sławek (POL); Gudrun Stock (GER)	Denis Rugovac (CZE); Laura Süßemilch (GER)
GP Prostejov - Memorial of Otmar Malecek; Czech Republic 28–29 August	Madison	Vincent Hoppezak (NED)/Philip Heijnen (NED); Daria Pikulik (POL)/Wiktoria Pikulik (POL)	Michele Scartezzini (ITA)/Francesco Lamon (ITA); Alžbeta Bačíková (SVK)/Gudrun Stock (GER)	Denis Rugovac (CZE)/Jan Kraus (CZE); Laura Süßemilch (GER)/Lena Charlotte Reißner (GER)
Grand Prix Prešov; Slovakia 30 August–1 September	Sprint	Mateusz Rudyk (POL); Urszula Łoś (POL)	Maximilian Levy (GER); Marlena Karwacka (POL)	Rafał Sarnecki (POL); Paulina Petri (POL)
Grand Prix Prešov; Slovakia 30 August–1 September	Keirin	Maximilian Levy (GER); Urszula Łoś (POL)	Rafał Sarnecki (POL); Marlena Karwacka (POL)	Patryk Rajkowski (POL); Paulina Petri (POL)
Grand Prix Prešov; Slovakia 30 August–1 September	Omnium	Matias Malmberg (DEN)	Denis Rugovac (CZE)	Jan Kraus (CZE)
Grand Prix Prešov; Slovakia 30 August–1 September	Scratch	Bartosz Rudyk (POL); Daria Pikulik (POL)	Matias Malmberg (DEN); Nikol Płosaj (POL)	Nicolas Pietrula (CZE); Petra Ševčíková (CZE)
Grand Prix Prešov; Slovakia 30 August–1 September	Madison	Daria Pikulik (POL)/Nikol Płosaj (POL)	Kateřina Kohoutková (CZE)/Petra Ševčíková (CZE)	Aleksandra Tołomanow (POL)/Oliwia Majewska (POL)
Grand Prix of Moscow; Russia 3–5 September	Keirin	Mikhail Yakovlev (RUS)	Denis Dmitriev (RUS)	Evgeny Kalmykov (RUS)
Grand Prix of Moscow; Russia 3–5 September	Scratch	Aleksandr Shakotko (RUS); Elena Brejniva (RUS)	Victor Podoynikov (RUS); Anastasiya Lukashenko (RUS)	Vladimir Ilchenko (RUS); Maria Averina (RUS)
Grand Prix of Moscow; Russia 3–5 September	Points Race	Gulnaz Khatuntseva (RUS)	Maria Averina (RUS)	Anastasiya Lukashenko (RUS)
Grand Prix of Moscow; Russia 3–5 September	Team Sprint	Russia (RUS); Alexander Sharapov (RUS); Denis Dmitriev (RUS); Nikita Shurshin (RUS); Russia (RUS); Ekaterina Rogovaya (RUS); Daria Shmeleva (RUS)	Russia (RUS); Mihail Smagin (RUS); Mikhail Dmitriev (RUS); Andrey Kuzmenko (RUS); Russia (RUS); Natalia Antonova (RUS); Ksenia Andreeva (RUS)	Belarus (BLR); Yauhen Veramchuk (BLR); Gleb Vishnev (BLR); Artsiom Zaitsau (BLR); Russia (RUS); Yana Tyshchenko (RUS); Polina Vashchenko (RUS)
GP Framar; Czech Republic 4–6 September	Sprint	Jakub Šťastný (CZE); Veronika Jaborníková (CZE)	Tomáš Bábek (CZE); Sára Kaňkovská (CZE)	David Sojka (CZE); Anna Jaborníková (CZE)
GP Framar; Czech Republic 4–6 September	Keirin	Martin Čechman (CZE)	Matteo Bianchi (ITA)	Tomáš Bábek (CZE)
GP Framar; Czech Republic 4–6 September	Omnium	Stefano Moro (ITA); Anita Stenberg (NOR)	Filippo Ferronato (ITA); Petra Ševčíková (CZE)	Denis Rugovac (CZE); Kateřina Kohoutková (CZE)
GP Framar; Czech Republic 4–6 September	Points Race	Nicolas Pietrula (CZE); Anita Stenberg (NOR)	Stefano Moro (ITA); Francesca Selva (ITA)	Maximilian Schmidbauer (AUT); Jarmila Machačová (CZE)
GP Framar; Czech Republic 4–6 September	Scratch	Mattia Pinazzi (ITA); Anita Stenberg (NOR)	Daniel Babor (CZE); Francesca Selva (ITA)	Facundo Lezica (ARG); Petra Ševčíková (CZE)
GP Framar; Czech Republic 4–6 September	Individual Pursuit	Jan Kraus (CZE); Francesca Selva (ITA)	Nicolas Pietrula (CZE); Giorgia Fraiegari (ITA)	Maximilian Schmidbauer (AUT) —
GP Framar; Czech Republic 4–6 September	Madison	Stefano Moro (ITA)/Mattia Pinazzi (ITA); Kateřina Kohoutková (CZE)/Petra Ševčíková (CZE)	Filippo Ferronato (ITA)/Facundo Lezica (ARG); Sabina Džerengová (CZE)/Dagmar Hejhalová (CZE)	Denis Rugovac (CZE)/Pavel Kelemen (CZE); Francesca Selva (ITA)/Giorgia Fraiegari (ITA)
Grand Prix of Saint Petersburg; Russia 9–12 September	Team Sprint	Russia (RUS); Daniil Komkov (RUS); Alexander Dubchenko (RUS); Pavel Rostov (RUS); Dmitriy Nesterov (RUS)*; Russia (RUS); Yana Tyshchenko (RUS); Serafima Grichina (RUS); Anastasiya Sukhareva (RUS)*	Russia (RUS); Alexander Sharapov (RUS); Nikita Shurshin (RUS); Denis Dmitriev (RUS); Russia (RUS); Natalia Antonova (RUS); Ekaterina Gnidenko (RUS)	Russia (RUS); Roman Gavrilov (RUS); Alexey Tkachev (RUS); Kirill Lii (RUS); Arkadiy Sapozhnikov (RUS)*; Belarus (BLR); Dziyana Miadzvetskaya (BLR); Yuliya Manets (BLR)
Grand Prix of Saint Petersburg; Russia 9–12 September	Scratch	Kiryl Prymakou (BLR); Ekaterina Koroleva (RUS)	Victor Podoynikov (RUS); Maria Averina (RUS)	Aliaksei Shmanstar (BLR); Elena Brejniva (RUS)
Grand Prix of Saint Petersburg; Russia 9–12 September	Sprint	Denis Dmitriev (RUS); Yana Tyshchenko (RUS)	Mikhail Yakovlev (RUS); Serafima Grichina (RUS)	Danila Burlakov (RUS); Ksenia Andreeva (RUS)
Grand Prix of Saint Petersburg; Russia 9–12 September	Points Race	Kiryl Prymakou (BLR); Maria Averina (RUS)	Artur Kiryievich (BLR); Dziyana Lebedz (BLR)	Aliaksei Shmanstar (BLR); Angelina Antipova (RUS)
Grand Prix of Saint Petersburg; Russia 9–12 September	Madison	Artur Kiryievich (BLR)/Uladzislau Sauchyts (BLR); Angelina Antipova (RUS)/Olga Nikishina (RUS)	Kiryl Prymakou (BLR)/Mark Grinkevich (BLR); Dziyana Lebedz (BLR)/Anastasiya Bahdanava (BLR)	Nikita Semashko (BLR)/Eduard Ksiandzou (BLR); Sofia Volodina (RUS)/Alina Melikhova (RUS)
Grand Prix of Saint Petersburg; Russia 9–12 September	Keirin	Denis Dmitriev (RUS); Ekaterina Gnidenko (RUS)	Alexander Dubchenko (RUS); Serafima Grichina (RUS)	Alexey Tkachev (RUS); Elena Brejniva (RUS)
16è Trofeu Internacional Ciutat de Barcelona - Memorial Miquel Poblet; Spain 12 September	Keirin	Gerard García Gómez (ESP); Helena Casas (ESP)	Itmar Esteban Herraiz (ESP); Laura Rodríguez Cordero (ESP)	Manel Usach Sancho (ESP); Andrea Ortiz De La Cabada (VEN)
16è Trofeu Internacional Ciutat de Barcelona - Memorial Miquel Poblet; Spain 12 September	Omnium	Iúri Leitão (POR); Anita Stenberg (NOR)	Juan José Lobato (ESP); Eukene Larrarte Arteaga (ESP)	Illart Zuazubiskar (ESP); Tania Calvo (ESP)
16è Trofeu Internacional Ciutat de Barcelona - Memorial Miquel Poblet; Spain 12 September	Madison	Iúri Leitão (POR)/Felix English (IRL); Eukene Larrarte Arteaga (ESP)/Tania Calvo (ESP)	Yacine Chalel (ALG)/Didier Baptiste (FRA); Marga López (ESP)/Nekane Gómez (ESP)	Santiago Cadavid Rivera (GBR)/Louis Bilyard (IRL); Fanny Cauchois (FRA)/Garazi Estévez Güede (ESP)
Grand Prix Favorite Brno; Czech Republic 24–25 September	Omnium	Daniel Staniszewski (POL); Rachele Barbieri (ITA)	Lindsay De Vylder (BEL); Łucja Pietrzak (POL)	Richard Banusch (GER); Nikol Płosaj (POL)
Grand Prix Favorite Brno; Czech Republic 24–25 September	Madison	Lindsay De Vylder (BEL)/Jules Hesters (BEL); Nikol Płosaj (POL)/Łucja Pietrzak (POL)	Petr Kelemen (CZE)/Daniel Babor (CZE); Finja Smekal (GER)/Lea Lin Teutenberg (GER)	Michele Scartezzini (ITA)/Mattia Pinazzi (ITA); Rachele Barbieri (ITA)/Francesca Selva (ITA)
3 Jours d'Aigle; Switzerland 1–3 October	Elimination Race	Fabio Van den Bossche (BEL); Clara Copponi (FRA)	Claudio Imhof (SUI); Rachele Barbieri (ITA)	Henry Lawton (GBR); Victoire Berteau (FRA)
3 Jours d'Aigle; Switzerland 1–3 October	Omnium	Kenny De Ketele (BEL); Silvia Zanardi (ITA)	Fabio Van den Bossche (BEL); Jolien D'Hoore (BEL)	Donavan Grondin (FRA); Lotte Kopecky (BEL)
3 Jours d'Aigle; Switzerland 1–3 October	Points Race	Fabio Van den Bossche (BEL); Marie Le Net (FRA)	Joffrey Degueurce (FRA); Jolien D'Hoore (BEL)	Kévin Vauquelin (FRA); Marion Borras (FRA)
3 Jours d'Aigle; Switzerland 1–3 October	Scratch	Donavan Grondin (FRA); Jolien D'Hoore (BEL)	Tristan Marguet (SUI); Chiara Consonni (ITA)	Fabio Van den Bossche (BEL); Marie Le Net (FRA)
3 Jours d'Aigle; Switzerland 1–3 October	Individual Pursuit	Jonathan Milan (ITA); Martina Alzini (ITA)	Claudio Imhof (SUI); Marion Borras (FRA)	Kévin Vauquelin (FRA); Aline Seitz (SUI)
3 Jours d'Aigle; Switzerland 1–3 October	Madison	Théry Schir (SUI)/Robin Froidevaux (SUI); Lotte Kopecky (BEL)/Jolien D'Hoore (BEL)	Donavan Grondin (FRA)/Morgan Kneisky (FRA); Clara Copponi (FRA)/Victoire Berteau (FRA)	Kenny De Ketele (BEL)/Jules Hesters (BEL); Marion Borras (FRA)/Marie Le Net (FRA)
Evento Internacional de Pista Cali Panamericana; Colombia 11 December	Sprint	Kevin Quintero (COL); Martha Bayona (COL)	Cristian Ortega Fontalvo (COL); Jessica Salazar (MEX)	Rubén Murillo (COL); Yuli Verdugo (MEX)
Evento Internacional de Pista Cali Panamericana; Colombia 11 December	Keirin	Kevin Quintero (COL); Daniela Gaxiola (MEX)	Santiago Ramírez (COL); Martha Bayona (COL)	Brandon Pineda (GUA); Joanne Rodríguez Hacohen (GUA)
Evento Internacional de Pista Cali Panamericana; Colombia 11 December	Omnium	Jordan Parra (COL); Lizbeth Salazar (MEX)	Ángel Pulgar (VEN); Milena Salcedo (COL)	Samuel Hauane Reikdal Stachera (BRA); Denisse Ahumada (CHI)
Evento Internacional de Pista Cali Panamericana; Colombia 11 December	Madison	Felipe Peñaloza (CHI)/Antonio Cabrera (CHI); Yareli Acevedo (MEX)/Victoria Velasco (MEX)	Brayan Sánchez (COL)/Juan Arango (COL); Lina Hernández (COL)/Lina Rojas (COL)	José Muñiz Vázquez (MEX)/Ricardo Peña Salas (MEX); Jessica Parra (COL)/Tatiana Dueñas (COL)
Evento Internacional Ciudad de Cali; Colombia 12 December	Sprint	Kevin Quintero (COL); Daniela Gaxiola (MEX)	Santiago Ramírez (COL); Rubén Murillo (COL); Jessica Salazar (MEX)	Not awarded Martha Bayona (COL)
Evento Internacional Ciudad de Cali; Colombia 12 December	Keirin	Kevin Quintero (COL); Yuli Verdugo (MEX)	Santiago Ramírez (COL); Martha Bayona (COL)	Juan Carlos Ruiz Terán (MEX); Juliana Gaviria (COL)
Evento Internacional Ciudad de Cali; Colombia 12 December	Omnium	José Manuel Gutiérrez (COL); Milena Salcedo (COL)	Tomas Aguirre (MEX); Alice Tamirys Leite De Melo (BRA)	Jordan Parra (COL); Sofía Arreola (MEX)
Evento Internacional Ciudad de Cali; Colombia 12 December	Madison	José Muñiz Vázquez (MEX)/Ricardo Peña Salas (MEX); Lizbeth Salazar (MEX)/Victoria Velasco (MEX)	Antonio Cabrera (CHI)/Felipe Peñaloza (CHI); Lina Hernández (COL)/Lina Rojas (COL)	Brayan Sánchez (COL)/Juan Arango (COL); Paola Muñoz (CHI)/Aranza Villalón (CHI)
Torneo Internacional de Pista "Cali Panamericana"; Colombia 13 December	Sprint	Kevin Quintero (COL); Daniela Gaxiola (MEX)	Rubén Murillo (COL); Yuli Verdugo (MEX)	Santiago Ramírez (COL); Martha Bayona (COL)
Torneo Internacional de Pista "Cali Panamericana"; Colombia 13 December	Keirin	Kevin Quintero (COL); Martha Bayona (COL)	Juan Carlos Ruiz Terán (MEX); Juliana Gaviria (COL)	Samir Felipe Cambindo (COL); Jessica Salazar (MEX)
Torneo Internacional de Pista "Cali Panamericana"; Colombia 13 December	Omnium	Juan Arango (COL); Lizbeth Salazar (MEX)	Pedro Rodríguez (ECU); Lina Hernández (COL)	Ricardo Pereira Dalamaria (BRA); Sofía Arreola (MEX)
Torneo Internacional de Pista "Cali Panamericana"; Colombia 13 December	Madison	Brayan Sánchez (COL)/Jordan Parra (COL); Victoria Velasco (MEX)/Yareli Acevedo (MEX)	Carlos Tobón (COL)/Marvin Angarita (COL); Milena Salcedo (COL)/Lina Rojas (COL)	Felipe Peñaloza (CHI)/Antonio Cabrera (CHI); Tatiana Dueñas (COL)/Jessica Parra (COL)

== Continental Championships ==
Championships	Race	Winner	Second	Third
UEC European Track Championships; Italy 11–15 November (2020 summary)	Sprint	Maximilian Levy; Germany; Anastasia Voynova; Russia	Denis Dmitriev; Russia; Daria Shmeleva; Russia	Vasilijus Lendel; Lithuania; Olena Starikova; Ukraine
UEC European Track Championships; Italy 11–15 November (2020 summary)	Team sprint	Russia; Denis Dmitriev; Pavel Yakushevskiy; Ivan Gladyshev; Alexander Sharapov; Russia; Anastasia Voynova; Daria Shmeleva; Natalia Antonova; Ekaterina Rogovaya	Czech Republic; Tomáš Bábek; Dominik Topinka; Martin Čechman; Jakub Šťastný; Great Britain; Milly Tanner; Blaine Ridge-Davis; Lusia Steele; Lauren Bate	Greece; Sotirios Bretas; Ioannis Kalogeropoulos; Konstantinos Livanos; Ukraine; Liubov Basova; Olena Starikova; Oleksandra Lohviniuk
UEC European Track Championships; Italy 11–15 November (2020 summary)	Team pursuit	Russia; Alexander Dubchenko; Lev Gonov; Nikita Bersenev; Alexander Evtushenko; Great Britain; Josie Knight; Laura Kenny; Katie Archibald; Neah Evans; Elinor Barker	Italy; Francesco Lamon; Stefano Moro; Jonathan Milan; Gidas Umbri; Italy; Martina Alzini; Elisa Balsamo; Chiara Consonni; Vittoria Guazzini; Rachele Barbieri	Switzerland; Claudio Imhof; Simon Vitzthum; Lukas Rüegg; Dominik Bieler; Ukraine; Anna Nahirna; Tetyana Klimchenko; Viktoriya Bondar; Yuliia Biriukova
UEC European Track Championships; Italy 11–15 November (2020 summary)	Keirin	Maximilian Levy; Germany; Olena Starikova; Ukraine	Denis Dmitriev; Russia; Sára Kaňkovská; Czech Republic	Sotirios Bretas; Greece; Helena Casas; Spain
UEC European Track Championships; Italy 11–15 November (2020 summary)	Omnium	Matthew Walls; Great Britain; Elisa Balsamo; Italy	Yauheni Karaliok; Belarus; Laura Kenny; Great Britain	Iúri Leitão; Portugal; Maria Novolodskaya; Russia
UEC European Track Championships; Italy 11–15 November (2020 summary)	Madison	Spain; Sebastián Mora; Albert Torres; Italy; Elisa Balsamo; Vittoria Guazzini	Portugal; Ivo Oliveira; Rui Oliveira; Russia; Diana Klimova; Maria Novolodskaya	Italy; Francesco Lamon; Stefano Moro; Great Britain; Laura Kenny; Elinor Barker
UEC European Track Championships; Italy 11–15 November (2020 summary)	1 km time trial 500 m time trial	Tomáš Bábek; Czech Republic; Daria Shmeleva; Russia	Ethan Vernon; Great Britain; Anastasia Voynova; Russia	Jonathan Milan; Italy; Miriam Vece; Italy
UEC European Track Championships; Italy 11–15 November (2020 summary)	Individual pursuit	Ivo Oliveira; Portugal; Neah Evans; Great Britain	Jonathan Milan; Italy; Martina Alzini; Italy	Lev Gonov; Russia; Silvia Valsecchi; Italy
UEC European Track Championships; Italy 11–15 November (2020 summary)	Points race	Sebastián Mora; Spain; Katie Archibald; Great Britain	Matteo Donegà; Italy; Silvia Zanardi; Italy	Daniel Crista; Romania; Karolina Karasiewicz; Poland
UEC European Track Championships; Italy 11–15 November (2020 summary)	Scratch	Iúri Leitão; Portugal; Martina Fidanza; Italy	Roman Gladysh; Ukraine; Hanna Tserakh; Belarus	Oliver Wood; Great Britain; Tetyana Klimchenko; Ukraine
UEC European Track Championships; Italy 11–15 November (2020 summary)	Elimination race	Matthew Walls; Great Britain; Elinor Barker; Great Britain	Iúri Leitão; Portugal; Rachele Barbieri; Italy	Sergey Rostovtsev; Russia; Maria Martins; Portugal
African Track Cycling Championship; Egypt 10–13 March (2021 summary)
African Track Cycling Championship; Egypt 10–13 March (2021 summary)	Sprint	Jean Spies; South Africa; Charlene du Preez; South Africa	Mitchell Sparrow; South Africa; Ese Lovina Ukpeseraye; Nigeria	Mohamed Sadki; Morocco; Rita Ifeakam Oveh; Nigeria
African Track Cycling Championship; Egypt 10–13 March (2021 summary)	Team sprint	South Africa; Jean Spies; Mitchell Sparrow; Joshua van Wyk; Nigeria; Ese Lovina Ukpeseraye; Rita Ifeakam Oveh; Tawakalt Oyetayo Yekeen	Egypt; Ahmed Elsenfawi; Ahmed Saad; Hussein Hassan; Egypt; Ebtissam Mohamed; Salma Mostafa; Maryam Yaser	Algeria; Oussama Cheblaoui; Nassim Saidi; Yacine Hamza; Morocco; Fatima El Hayani; Fatima Zahra Benzekri; Hakima Barhraoui
African Track Cycling Championship; Egypt 10–13 March (2021 summary)	Team pursuit	South Africa; David Maree; Stephanus van Heerden; Kyle Swanepoel; Dillon Geary; Nigeria; Ese Lovina Ukpeseraye; Tawakalt Oyetayo Yekeen; Grace Ayuba; Mary Sunday Samuel	Algeria; Youcef Reguigui; Lotfi Tchambaz; Yacine Hamza; Yacine Chalel; Morocco; Fatima El Hayani; Fatima Zahra Benzekri; Nora Sahmoud; Hakima Barhraoui	Morocco; Mohcine El Kouraji; El Houçaine Sabbahi; Achraf Ed Doghmy; Lahcen El Mejdoubi; Not awarded
African Track Cycling Championship; Egypt 10–13 March (2021 summary)	Keirin	Jean Spies; South Africa; Charlene du Preez; South Africa	Mitchell Sparrow; South Africa; Minata Soro; Ivory Coast	Ahmed Elsenfawi; Egypt; Ese Lovina Ukpeseraye; Nigeria
African Track Cycling Championship; Egypt 10–13 March (2021 summary)	Omnium	David Maree; South Africa; Ebtissam Mohamed; Egypt	Joshua van Wyk; South Africa; Fatima El Hayani; Morocco	Kyle Swanepoel; South Africa; Courtney Smith; South Africa
African Track Cycling Championship; Egypt 10–13 March (2021 summary)	Madison	South Africa; Joshua van Wyk; Stephanus van Heerden; Egypt; Ebtissam Mohamed; Maryam Yaser	Algeria; Lotfi Tchambaz; Yacine Chalel; Nigeria; Ese Lovina Ukpeseraye; Tawakalt Oyetayo Yekeen	South Africa; Kyle Swanepoel; Dillon Geary; Not awarded
African Track Cycling Championship; Egypt 10–13 March (2021 summary)	1 km time trial 500 m time trial	Jean Spies; South Africa; Charlene Du Preez; South Africa	Mitchell Sparrow; South Africa; Rita Ifeakam Oveh; Nigeria	Yacine Hamza; Algeria; Fatima El Hayani; Morocco
African Track Cycling Championship; Egypt 10–13 March (2021 summary)	Individual pursuit	Kyle Swanepoel; South Africa; Ebtissam Mohamed; Egypt	Dillon Geary; South Africa; Fatima El Hayani; Morocco	Mohcine El Kouraji; Morocco; Courtney Smith; South Africa
African Track Cycling Championship; Egypt 10–13 March (2021 summary)	Points race	Dillon Geary; South Africa; Ebtissam Zayed; Egypt	Mohcine El Kouraji; Morocco; Fatima El Hayani; Morocco	Yacine Chalel; Algeria; Courtney Smith; South Africa
African Track Cycling Championship; Egypt 10–13 March (2021 summary)	Scratch	Joshua van Wyk; South Africa; Ebtissam Mohamed; Egypt	Yacine Chalel; Algeria; Fatima El Hayani; Morocco	Kyle Swanepoel; South Africa; Minata Soro; Ivory Coast
African Track Cycling Championship; Egypt 10–13 March (2021 summary)	Elimination race	Joshua van Wyk; South Africa; Ebtissam Mohamed; Egypt	David Maree; South Africa; Fatima El Hayani; Morocco	Yacine Chalel; Algeria; Courtney Smith; South Africa

== National Championships ==
=== From a standing start ===
Date	Venue	Podium (Men)	Podium (Women)
23 October	Poland; Pruszków	Mateusz Rudyk	Urszula Łoś
23 October	Poland; Pruszków	Rafał Sarnecki	Marlena Karwacka
23 October	Poland; Pruszków	Patryk Rajkowski	Nikola Seremak
3 November	Russia; Saint Petersburg	Pavel Rostov	Natalia Antonova
3 November	Russia; Saint Petersburg	Alexander Dubchenko	Serafima Grishina
3 November	Russia; Saint Petersburg	Dmitriy Nesterov	Alina Lysenko

=== Elimination Race ===
Date	Venue	Podium (Men)	Podium (Women)
12 July	Slovakia; Prešov	Štefan Michalička	Alžbeta Bačíková
12 July	Slovakia; Prešov	Martin Chren	Nora Jenčušová
12 July	Slovakia; Prešov	Lukáš Kubiš	Tereza Medveďová
15 August	Finland; Helsinki	Juhana Hietala	Pia Pensaari
15 August	Finland; Helsinki	Axel Källberg	Ida Sten
15 August	Finland; Helsinki	Timo Erjomaa	Aino Hämäläinen
23 October	Poland; Pruszków	Stanisław Aniołkowski	Daria Pikulik
23 October	Poland; Pruszków	Alan Banaszek	Łucja Pietrzak
23 October	Poland; Pruszków	Szymon Krawczyk	Nikol Płosaj
24 October	Switzerland —	Tristan Marguet	Aline Seitz
24 October	Switzerland —	Claudio Imhof	Michelle Andres
24 October	Switzerland —	Lukas Rüegg	Léna Mettraux
28 October	Italy; Ascoli Piceno	Francesco Lamon	Martina Alzini
28 October	Italy; Ascoli Piceno	Michele Scartezzini	Rachele Barbieri
28 October	Italy; Ascoli Piceno	Liam Bertazzo	Martina Fidanza
1 November	Russia; Saint Petersburg	Vlas Shichkin	Gulnaz Badykova
1 November	Russia; Saint Petersburg	Gleb Syritsa	Maria Novolodskaya
1 November	Russia; Saint Petersburg	Denis Denisov	Daria Malkova
8 November	Japan; TBD	Eiya Hashimoto	Yumi Kajihara
8 November	Japan; TBD	Kazushige Kuboki	Nao Suzuki
8 November	Japan; TBD	Muneyoshi Abiko	Kisato Nakamura
29 November	Mexico; Aguascalientes City	Ulises Alfredo Castillo	Lizbeth Salazar
29 November	Mexico; Aguascalientes City	Edibaldo Maldonado	Mayra del Rocío Rocha Guerrero
29 November	Mexico; Aguascalientes City	Fabrizio Von Nacher	Jessica Bonilla
29 November	New Zealand; Cambridge	Regan Gough	Nicole Shields
29 November	New Zealand; Cambridge	Kiaan Watts	Bryony Botha
29 November	New Zealand; Cambridge	Campbell Stewart	Rushlee Buchanan
6 December	Israel; Tel Aviv	Alon Yogev	Gali Wallach
6 December	Israel; Tel Aviv	Rotem Tene	—
6 December	Israel; Tel Aviv	Guy Weinberg	—
20 December	Australia; Brisbane	—	Shannon McCurley
20 December	Australia; Brisbane	—	Alexandra Martin-Wallace
20 December	Australia; Brisbane	—	Lucie Fitys
10 February	Czech Republic; Prague	Daniel Babor	Petra Ševčíková
10 February	Czech Republic; Prague	Jan Voneš	Jarmila Machačová
10 February	Czech Republic; Prague	Pavel Kelemen	Kateřina Kohoutková
26 February	New Zealand; Invercargill; 2021 Edition	Corbin Strong	Olivia Ray
26 February	New Zealand; Invercargill; 2021 Edition	Aaron Gate	Bryony Botha
26 February	New Zealand; Invercargill; 2021 Edition	Regan Gough	Courtney King

=== Sprint ===
Date	Venue	Podium (Men)	Podium (Women)
15 March	Trinidad and Tobago; Couva	Nicholas Paul	—
15 March	Trinidad and Tobago; Couva	Kwesi Browne	—
15 March	Trinidad and Tobago; Couva	Quincy Alexander	—
3 July	Czech Republic; Prague	Tomáš Bábek	Veronika Jaborníková
3 July	Czech Republic; Prague	Martin Čechman	Sára Kaňkovská
3 July	Czech Republic; Prague	Jakub Šťastný	—
5 July	Switzerland; Aigle	Robin Froidevaux	—
5 July	Switzerland; Aigle	Nicolò De Lisi	—
5 July	Switzerland; Aigle	Valère Thiébaud	—
11 July	South Korea; Yangyang County	Kim Cheng-su	Cho Sun-young
11 July	South Korea; Yangyang County	Jeong Yun-hyeok	Lee Hye-jin
11 July	South Korea; Yangyang County	One Jun-oh	Choi Seul-gi
12 July	Croatia; Zagreb	Domagoj Kostić	—
12 July	Croatia; Zagreb	Janko Benger	—
12 July	Croatia; Zagreb	Lorenzo Marenzi	—
18 July	United StatesBreinigsville, Pennsylvania	Jamie Alvord	Mandy Marquardt
18 July	United StatesBreinigsville, Pennsylvania	Andrew Carlberg	Kayla Hankins
18 July	United StatesBreinigsville, Pennsylvania	Geneway Tang	Allyson Wasielewski
29 August	Ireland; Dublin	Harvey Barnes	Orla Walsh
29 August	Ireland; Dublin	Eoin Mullen	Deirbhle Ivory
29 August	Ireland; Dublin	Callum O'Toole	Lara Gillespie
2 September	Ukraine; Lviv	Dmytro Stovbetskyi	Olena Starikova
2 September	Ukraine; Lviv	Vladyslav Denysenko	Alla Biletska
2 September	Ukraine; Lviv	Bohdan Danylchuk	Oleksandra Logvynyuk
4 September	Denmark; Aarhus	Tim Bendtsen	Julie Leth
4 September	Denmark; Aarhus	Rasmus Søgaard	Amalie Winther Olsen
4 September	Denmark; Aarhus	Christoffer Ebert	Karoline Hemmsen
13 September	Greece; Athens	Sotirios Bretas	Argyro Milaki
13 September	Greece; Athens	Konstantinos Livanos	Ioanna Plega-Gavrilaki
13 September	Greece; Athens	Ioannis Kalogeropoulos	Sofia Liodaki
20 September	Hungary; Budapest	Patrik Rómeó Lovassy	Petra Jászapáti
20 September	Hungary; Budapest	Sándor Szalontay	Zsófia Szabó
20 September	Hungary; Budapest	Péter Prájczer	Tamara László
27 September	Spain; Tafalla	Juan Peralta	Helena Casas
27 September	Spain; Tafalla	Ekain Jiménez Elizondo	Nerea Nuño
27 September	Spain; Tafalla	Alejandro Martínez Chorro	Diana Pérez
1 October	Kazakhstan; Nur-Sultan	Andrey Chugay	—
1 October	Kazakhstan; Nur-Sultan	Sergey Ponomaryov	—
1 October	Kazakhstan; Nur-Sultan	Alexandr Safarov	—
4 October	Belarus; Minsk	Artsiom Zaitsau	Dziyana Miadzvetskaya
4 October	Belarus; Minsk	Gleb Vishnev	Yuliya Manets
4 October	Belarus; Minsk	Aliaksandr Hlova	Darya Dziakola
23 October	Poland; Pruszków	Mateusz Rudyk	Urszula Łoś
23 October	Poland; Pruszków	Patryk Rajkowski	Marlena Karwacka
23 October	Poland; Pruszków	Rafał Sarnecki	Nikola Sibiak
28 October	Italy; Ascoli Piceno	Francesco Ceci	Miriam Vece
28 October	Italy; Ascoli Piceno	Dario Zampieri	Elena Bissolati
28 October	Italy; Ascoli Piceno	Paolo Totò	Giada Capobianchi
31 October	Russia; Saint Petersburg	Denis Dmitriev	Daria Shmeleva
31 October	Russia; Saint Petersburg	Mikhail Yakovlev	Anastasia Voynova
31 October	Russia; Saint Petersburg	Pavel Yakushevskiy	Serafima Grishina
8 November	Japan; TBD	Tomohiro Fukaya	Riyu Ohta
8 November	Japan; TBD	Kento Yamasaki	Fuko Umekawa
8 November	Japan; TBD	Yudai Nitta	Yuka Kobayashi
8 November	Romania; Plovdiv (Bulgaria)	Norbert Szabo	Adriana Ceaușescu
8 November	Romania; Plovdiv (Bulgaria)	Eduard-Michael Grosu	Maria-Ecaterina Stancu
8 November	Romania; Plovdiv (Bulgaria)	Dániel Mădăraș	Miriam Stan
29 November	Mexico; Aguascalientes City	Edgar Verdugo	Daniela Gaxiola
29 November	Mexico; Aguascalientes City	Juan Contreras Sánchez	Jessica Salazar
29 November	Mexico; Aguascalientes City	Carlos Alberto Paredes Camacho	Yuli Verdugo
29 November	New Zealand; Cambridge; 2020 Edition	Sam Webster	Ellesse Andrews
29 November	New Zealand; Cambridge; 2020 Edition	Sam Dakin	Shaane Fulton
29 November	New Zealand; Cambridge; 2020 Edition	Bradly Knipe	Emma Cumming
6 December	Costa Rica; San José	Nayib Leandro Madrigal	Abigail Recio Carvajal
6 December	Costa Rica; San José	Javier Alvarado Méndez	—
6 December	Costa Rica; San José	Carlos Piedra Quesada	—
16 December	Australia; Brisbane	Matthew Richardson	Kristina Clonan
16 December	Australia; Brisbane	Nathan Hart	Bree Hargreave
16 December	Australia; Brisbane	James Brister	Lizanne Fox
25 February	New Zealand; Invercargill; 2021 Edition	Sam Webster	Shaane Fulton
25 February	New Zealand; Invercargill; 2021 Edition	Ethan Mitchell	Ellesse Andrews
25 February	New Zealand; Invercargill; 2021 Edition	Sam Dakin	Emma Cumming

=== Keirin ===
Date	Venue	Podium (Men)	Podium (Women)
3 July	Czech Republic; Prague	Martin Čechman	Veronika Jaborníková
3 July	Czech Republic; Prague	Tomáš Bábek	Sára Kaňkovská
3 July	Czech Republic; Prague	David Sojka	—
11 July	South Korea; Yangyang County	Kim Cheng-su	Lee Hye-jin
11 July	South Korea; Yangyang County	Oh Min-jae	Kim Won-Gyeong
11 July	South Korea; Yangyang County	One Jun-oh	Park Min-am
16 July	United States; Breinigsville, Pennsylvania	Evan Boone	Mandy Marquardt
16 July	United States; Breinigsville, Pennsylvania	Tommy Quinn (cyclist)	Jennifer Wagner
16 July	United States; Breinigsville, Pennsylvania	Eric Young (cyclist)	Kayla Hankins
2 September	Ukraine; Lviv (2020 Edition)	Dmytro Stovbetskyi	Olena Starikova
2 September	Ukraine; Lviv (2020 Edition)	Bohdan Danylchuk	Alla Biletska
2 September	Ukraine; Lviv (2020 Edition)	Vladyslav Denysenko	Oleksandra Logvynyuk
13 September	Greece; Athens	Konstantinos Livanos	—
13 September	Greece; Athens	Sotirios Bretas	—
13 September	Greece; Athens	Dimitrios Voukelatos	—
20 September	Hungary; Budapest	Sándor Szalontay	—
20 September	Hungary; Budapest	Patrik Rómeó Lovassy	—
20 September	Hungary; Budapest	Bálint Csengői	—
27 September	Spain; Tafalla	José Moreno Sánchez	Helena Casas
27 September	Spain; Tafalla	Juan Peralta	Marga López
27 September	Spain; Tafalla	Alejandro Martínez Chorro	Laura Rodríguez Cordero
1 October	Kazakhstan; Nur-Sultan	Sergey Ponomaryov	—
1 October	Kazakhstan; Nur-Sultan	Alexandr Safarov	—
1 October	Kazakhstan; Nur-Sultan	Pavel Vorzhev	—
4 October	Belarus; Minsk	Artsiom Zaitsau	—
4 October	Belarus; Minsk	Aliaksandr Hlova	—
4 October	Belarus; Minsk	Gleb Vishnev	—
10 October	Ireland; Dublin	Harvey Barnes	Nikki Taggart
10 October	Ireland; Dublin	Aaron Wade	Deirbhle Ivory
10 October	Ireland; Dublin	Eoin Mullen	Eimer McMullan
23 October	Poland; Pruszków	Krzysztof Maksel	Nikola Sibiak
23 October	Poland; Pruszków	Patryk Rajkowski	Paulina Petri
23 October	Poland; Pruszków	Daniel Rochna	Urszula Łoś
28 October	Italy; Ascoli Piceno	Francesco Ceci	Elena Bissolati
28 October	Italy; Ascoli Piceno	Dario Zampieri	Giada Capobianchi
28 October	Italy; Ascoli Piceno	Mattia Corrocher	Martina Fidanza
2 November	Russia; Saint Petersburg	Alexander Sharapov	Anastasia Voynova
2 November	Russia; Saint Petersburg	Nikita Shurshin	Ekaterina Gnidenko
2 November	Russia; Saint Petersburg	Denis Dmitriev	Ekaterina Rogovaya
8 November	Japan; TBD	Tomohiro Fukaya	Fuko Umekawa
8 November	Japan; TBD	Yuta Wakimoto	Yuka Kobayashi
8 November	Japan; TBD	Tomoyuki Kawabata	Riyu Ohta
8 November	Romania; Plovdiv (Bulgaria)	Norbert Szabo	Maria-Ecaterina Stancu
8 November	Romania; Plovdiv (Bulgaria)	Eduard-Michael Grosu	Miriam Stan
8 November	Romania; Plovdiv (Bulgaria)	Dániel Mădăraș	Ioana-Theodora Crăciun-Bunda
29 November	Mexico; Aguascalientes City	Juan Carlos Ruíz Terán	Yuli Verdugo
29 November	Mexico; Aguascalientes City	Edgar Verdugo	Daniela Gaxiola
29 November	Mexico; Aguascalientes City	Jesús David Castillo Ramos	Jessica Salazar
29 November	New Zealand; Cambridge	Sam Dakin	Ellesse Andrews
29 November	New Zealand; Cambridge	Callum Saunders	Shaane Fulton
29 November	New Zealand; Cambridge	Jordan Castle	Emma Cumming
5 December	Israel; Tel Aviv	Iftah Shoshani	Gali Wallach
5 December	Israel; Tel Aviv	Alon Yogev	—
5 December	Israel; Tel Aviv	Guy Weinberg	—
6 December	Costa Rica; San José	Nayib Leandro Madrigal	Abigail Recio Carvajal
6 December	Costa Rica; San José	Javier Alvarado Méndez	—
6 December	Costa Rica; San José	Carlos Piedra Quesada	—
20 December	Australia; Brisbane	(Malaysia) Azizulhasni Awang	Kristina Clonan
20 December	Australia; Brisbane	Matthew Glaetzer	Bree Hargreave
20 December	Australia; Brisbane	(Malaysia) Muhammad Shah Firdaus Sahrom	Felice Beitzel
26 February	New Zealand; Invercargill; 2021 Edition	Sam Dakin	Shaane Fulton
26 February	New Zealand; Invercargill; 2021 Edition	Callum Saunders	Samantha Donnelly
26 February	New Zealand; Invercargill; 2021 Edition	Jackson Ogle	Ellesse Andrews
14 March	Ukraine; Lviv (2021 Edition)	Vladyslav Denysenko	Liubov Basova
14 March	Ukraine; Lviv (2021 Edition)	Bohdan Danylchuk	Oleksandra Lohviniuk
14 March	Ukraine; Lviv (2021 Edition)	Tadei-Ivan Chebanets	Yuliia Skoryshchenko

=== Time Trial ===
Date	Venue	Podium (Men)	Podium (Women)
15 March	Trinidad and Tobago; Couva	Azikiwe Kellar	—
15 March	Trinidad and Tobago; Couva	Vidal Ramlagan	—
15 March	Trinidad and Tobago; Couva	—	—
3 July	Czech Republic; Prague	Tomáš Bábek	Sára Kaňkovská
3 July	Czech Republic; Prague	Robin Wagner	Veronika Jaborníková
3 July	Czech Republic; Prague	Jiří Janošek	—
5 July	Switzerland; Aigle	Nicolò De Lisi	—
5 July	Switzerland; Aigle	Robin Froidevaux	—
5 July	Switzerland; Aigle	Damien Fortis	—
12 July	Slovakia; Prešov	Štefan Michalička	Tereza Medveďová
12 July	Slovakia; Prešov	Martin Chren	Petra Machálková
12 July	Slovakia; Prešov	Pavol Rovder	—
12 July	Croatia; Zagreb	Viktor Potočki	Mateja Posavec
12 July	Croatia; Zagreb	Filip Kvasina	Alessandra Musa
12 July	Croatia; Zagreb	Carlo Jurišević	Barbara Horvat
15 July	United States; Breinigsville, Pennsylvania	Jamie Alvord	Mandy Marquardt
15 July	United States; Breinigsville, Pennsylvania	Andrew Carlberg	Keely Kortman
15 July	United States; Breinigsville, Pennsylvania	Geneway Tang	Jennifer Wagner
15 August	Finland; Helsinki	Timo Erjomaa	Ida Sten
15 August	Finland; Helsinki	Juho Ala-Peijari	Pia Pensaari
15 August	Finland; Helsinki	Antti Träskelin	Sini Savolainen
29 August	Ireland; Dublin	Eoin Mullen	Orla Walsh
29 August	Ireland; Dublin	Harvey Barnes	Deirbhle Ivory
29 August	Ireland; Dublin	Aaron Wade	Nikki Taggart
2 September	Ukraine; Lviv (2020 Edition)	Roman Gladysh	Olena Starikova
2 September	Ukraine; Lviv (2020 Edition)	Vladyslav Denysenko	Lyubov Basova
2 September	Ukraine; Lviv (2020 Edition)	Mykhaylo-Yaroslav Dydko	Alla Biletska
13 September	Greece; Athens	Sotirios Bretas	—
13 September	Greece; Athens	Konstantinos Livanos	—
13 September	Greece; Athens	Ilias Tountas	—
20 September	Hungary; Budapest	Bálint Csengői	Petra Jászapáti
20 September	Hungary; Budapest	Péter Prájczer	Johanna Kitti Borissza
20 September	Hungary; Budapest	Márton Solymosi	Tamara László
27 September	Spain; Tafalla	Ekain Jiménez Elizondo	Helena Casas
27 September	Spain; Tafalla	José Moreno Sánchez	Maria Banlles Santamaria
27 September	Spain; Tafalla	Alfonso Cabello	Nekane Gómez
1 October	Kazakhstan; Nur-Sultan	Andrey Chugay	—
1 October	Kazakhstan; Nur-Sultan	Sergey Ponomaryov	—
1 October	Kazakhstan; Nur-Sultan	Pavel Vorzhev	—
4 October	Belarus; Minsk	Artsiom Zaitsau	Dziyana Miadzvetskaya
4 October	Belarus; Minsk	Gleb Vishnev	Yuliya Manets
4 October	Belarus; Minsk	Aliaksei Shnyrko	Darya Dziakola
23 October	Poland; Pruszków	Daniel Staniszewski	Daria Pikulik
23 October	Poland; Pruszków	Szymon Krawczyk	Wiktoria Pikulik
23 October	Poland; Pruszków	Damian Sławek	Łucja Pietrzak
28 October	Italy; Ascoli Piceno	Francesco Ceci	Miriam Vece
28 October	Italy; Ascoli Piceno	Dario Zampieri	Martina Fidanza
28 October	Italy; Ascoli Piceno	Mattia Corrocher	Elena Bissolati
1 November	Russia; Saint Petersburg	Gleb Syritsa	Valeria Golayeva
1 November	Russia; Saint Petersburg	Sergey Rostovtsev	Diana Klimova
1 November	Russia; Saint Petersburg	Arseny Nikiforov	Gulnaz Badykova
8 November	Japan; TBD	Yudai Nitta	Sakura Yamamoto
8 November	Japan; TBD	Shinji Nakano	Mina Sato
8 November	Japan; TBD	Yuta Obara	Yuka Matsui
8 November	Romania; Plovdiv (Bulgaria)	Norbert Szabo	Adriana Ceaușescu
8 November	Romania; Plovdiv (Bulgaria)	Daniel Crista	Maria-Ecaterina Stancu
8 November	Romania; Plovdiv (Bulgaria)	Carol-Eduard Novak	Miriam Stan
29 November	Mexico; Aguascalientes City	Edgar Verdugo	—
29 November	Mexico; Aguascalientes City	Roberto Serrano	—
29 November	Mexico; Aguascalientes City	Juan Contreras Sánchez	—
29 November	New Zealand; Cambridge	Adrian Hegyvary	Olivia Ray
29 November	New Zealand; Cambridge	Mark Stewart	Bryony Botha
29 November	New Zealand; Cambridge	Aaron Gate	Nicole Shields
5 December	Israel; Tel Aviv	Iftah Shoshani	Gali Wallach
5 December	Israel; Tel Aviv	Alon Yogev	—
5 December	Israel; Tel Aviv	Vladislav Logionov	—
6 December	Costa Rica; San José	Nayib Leandro Madrigal	Abigail Recio Carvajal
6 December	Costa Rica; San José	Javier Alvarado Méndez	—
6 December	Costa Rica; San José	Carlos Piedra Quesada	—
16 December	Australia; Brisbane (1000 m for Men's; 500 m for Women's)	Thomas Cornish	Kristina Clonan
16 December	Australia; Brisbane (1000 m for Men's; 500 m for Women's)	Josh Duffy	Bree Hargreave
16 December	Australia; Brisbane (1000 m for Men's; 500 m for Women's)	Graeme Frislie	Jacqui Mengler-Mohr
27 February	New Zealand; Invercargill (1000 m for Men's; 500 m for Women's)	Nicholas Kergozou	Shaane Fulton
27 February	New Zealand; Invercargill (1000 m for Men's; 500 m for Women's)	Joshua Scott	Ellesse Andrews
27 February	New Zealand; Invercargill (1000 m for Men's; 500 m for Women's)	Regan Gough	Olivia King
5 March	Ukraine; Lviv (2021 Edition)	Vladyslav Denysenko	Anna Lutsyk
5 March	Ukraine; Lviv (2021 Edition)	Yehor Korobov	Yuliia Skoryshchenko
5 March	Ukraine; Lviv (2021 Edition)	Bohdan Danylchuk	Tetyana Klimchenko
26 March	Israel; Tel Aviv (2021 Edition)	Iftah Shoshani	Gali Weinberg
26 March	Israel; Tel Aviv (2021 Edition)	Guy Weinberg	—
26 March	Israel; Tel Aviv (2021 Edition)	Pinhas Levi	—

=== Omnium ===
Date	Venue	Podium (Men)	Podium (Women)
15 March	Trinidad and Tobago; Couva	Jabari Whiteman	—
15 March	Trinidad and Tobago; Couva	Maurice Burnette	—
15 March	Trinidad and Tobago; Couva	Lorenzo Orosco	—
11 July	South Korea; Yangyang County	Shin Dong-in	Kang Hyun-kyung
11 July	South Korea; Yangyang County	Bang Seon-hoe	Oh Hyeon-ji
11 July	South Korea; Yangyang County	Park Young-kyun	Song Min-ji
12 July	Slovakia; Prešov	Lukáš Kubiš	Alžbeta Bačíková
12 July	Slovakia; Prešov	Štefan Michalička	Petra Machálková
12 July	Slovakia; Prešov	Ján Andrej Cully	—
14 August	Denmark; Aarhus	Matias Malmberg	Julie Leth
14 August	Denmark; Aarhus	Frederik Wandahl	Astrid Marie Bjørn Sørensen
14 August	Denmark; Aarhus	Arne Birkemose	Amalie Winther Olsen
15 August	Finland; Helsinki	Juho Ala-Peijari	Ida Sten
15 August	Finland; Helsinki	Axel Källberg	Aino Hämäläinen
15 August	Finland; Helsinki	Arttu Pekkarinen	Pia Pensaari
2 September	Ukraine; Lviv	Roman Gladysh	Kseniya Fedotova
2 September	Ukraine; Lviv	Vitaliy Hryniv	Anna Nahirna
2 September	Ukraine; Lviv	Kyrylo Tsarenko	Tetyana Klimchenko
20 September	Hungary; Budapest	Krisztián Lovassy	Johanna Kitti Borissza
20 September	Hungary; Budapest	Viktor Filutás	Tamara László
20 September	Hungary; Budapest	Gergő Orosz	Csenge Honos
1 October	Kazakhstan; Nur-Sultan	Artyom Zakharov	—
1 October	Kazakhstan; Nur-Sultan	Sultanmurat Miraliyev	—
1 October	Kazakhstan; Nur-Sultan	Gabiden Azen	—
4 October	Belarus; Minsk	Yauheni Karaliok	Tatsiana Sharakova
4 October	Belarus; Minsk	Raman Tsishkou	Dziyana Lebedz
4 October	Belarus; Minsk	Mikhail Shemetau	Ina Savenka
4 October	Greece; Athens	Christos Volikakis	Argyro Milaki
4 October	Greece; Athens	Zafeiris Volikakis	Sofia Liodaki
4 October	Greece; Athens	Dimitrios Christakos	Athina Chatzistyli
23 October	Poland; Pruszków	Daniel Staniszewski	Daria Pikulik
23 October	Poland; Pruszków	Alan Banaszek	Łucja Pietrzak
23 October	Poland; Pruszków	Filip Prokopyszyn	Marta Jaskulska
29 October	Austria; Wien	Daniel Auer	Kathrin Schweinberger
29 October	Austria; Wien	Andreas Müller	Verena Eberhardt
29 October	Austria; Wien	Felix Ritzinger	Leila Gschwentner
1 November	Russia; Saint Petersburg	Gleb Syritsa	Maria Novolodskaya
1 November	Russia; Saint Petersburg	Savva Novikov	Daria Malkova
1 November	Russia; Saint Petersburg	Sergey Rostovtsev	Diana Klimova
8 November	Japan; TBD	Eiya Hashimoto	Yumi Kajihara
8 November	Japan; TBD	Ryo Chikatani	Nao Suzuki
8 November	Japan; TBD	Hayato Okamoto	Tsuyaka Uchino
8 November	Romania; Plovdiv (Bulgaria)	Daniel Crista	—
8 November	Romania; Plovdiv (Bulgaria)	Valentin Plesea	—
8 November	Romania; Plovdiv (Bulgaria)	Eduard-Michael Grosu	—
29 November	Mexico; Aguascalientes City	Ulises Alfredo Castillo	Lizbeth Salazar
29 November	Mexico; Aguascalientes City	Ignacio Prado	Mayra del Rocío Rocha Guerrero
29 November	Mexico; Aguascalientes City	Ivan Carbajal	Jessica Bonilla
29 November	New Zealand; Cambridge	Aaron Gate	Nicole Shields
29 November	New Zealand; Cambridge	Campbell Stewart	Jessie Hodges
29 November	New Zealand; Cambridge	Corbin Strong	Bryony Botha
6 December	Israel; Tel Aviv	Alon Yogev	Gali Wallach
6 December	Israel; Tel Aviv	Iftah Shoshani	Rotem Gafinovitz
6 December	Israel; Tel Aviv	Vladislav Logionov	Antonina Reznikov
20 December	Australia; Brisbane	Conor Leahy	Alexandra Martin-Wallace
20 December	Australia; Brisbane	Liam Walsh	Shannon McCurley
20 December	Australia; Brisbane	Kurt Eather	Lucie Fitys
10 February	Czech Republic; Prague	Daniel Babor	Jarmila Machačová
10 February	Czech Republic; Prague	Jan Kraus	Petra Ševčíková
10 February	Czech Republic; Prague	Nicolas Pietrula	Kateřina Kohoutková
18 February	Switzerland; Grenchen	Théry Schir	—
18 February	Switzerland; Grenchen	Robin Froidevaux	—
18 February	Switzerland; Grenchen	Dominik Bieler	—
20 February	Norway; Palma de Mallorca (Spain)	—	Anita Stenberg
20 February	Norway; Palma de Mallorca (Spain)	—	—
20 February	Norway; Palma de Mallorca (Spain)	—	—
20 March	Uzbekistan; Tashkent	Danil Evdokimov	Yanina Kuskova
20 March	Uzbekistan; Tashkent	Muradjan Khalmuratov	Diana Adelshinova
20 March	Uzbekistan; Tashkent	Damir Zabirov	Ekaterina Knebeleva
26 March	Israel; Tel Aviv (2021 Edition)	Rotem Tene	Gali Wallach
26 March	Israel; Tel Aviv (2021 Edition)	Roy Rubinstein	Gali Weinberg
26 March	Israel; Tel Aviv (2021 Edition)	Oded Kogut	Orat Bash

=== Points Race ===
Date	Venue	Podium (Men)	Podium (Women)
15 March	Trinidad and Tobago; Couva	Sheldon Ramjit	—
15 March	Trinidad and Tobago; Couva	Maurice Burnette	—
15 March	Trinidad and Tobago; Couva	Emmanuel Watson	—
12 July	Slovakia; Prešov	Lukáš Kubiš	Alžbeta Bačíková
12 July	Slovakia; Prešov	Štefan Michalička	Petra Machálková
12 July	Slovakia; Prešov	Ján Andrej Cully	—
12 July	Croatia; Zagreb	Domagoj Kostić	—
12 July	Croatia; Zagreb	Lorenzo Marenzi	—
12 July	Croatia; Zagreb	Matija Lojen	—
26 July	Czech Republic; Plzeň	—	Jarmila Machačová
26 July	Czech Republic; Plzeň	—	Petra Ševčíková
26 July	Czech Republic; Plzeň	—	Kateřina Kohoutková
15 August	Finland; Helsinki	Juhana Hietala	Ida Sten
15 August	Finland; Helsinki	Juho Ala-Peijari	Pia Pensaari
15 August	Finland; Helsinki	Axel Källberg	Aino Hämäläinen
2 September	Ukraine; Lviv (2020 Edition)	Vitaliy Hryniv	Viktoriya Bondar
2 September	Ukraine; Lviv (2020 Edition)	Nazar Pokoiovyi	Anna Nahirna
2 September	Ukraine; Lviv (2020 Edition)	Maksym Vasilyev	Hanna Solovey
13 September	Greece; Athens	Christos Volikakis	—
13 September	Greece; Athens	Miltiades Giannoutsos	—
13 September	Greece; Athens	Ioannis Kiriakidis	—
20 September	Hungary; Budapest	Krisztián Lovassy	Johanna Kitti Borissza
20 September	Hungary; Budapest	Viktor Filutás	Tamara László
20 September	Hungary; Budapest	Gergő Orosz	Csenge Honos
27 September	Spain; Tafalla	Eloy Teruel	Isabel Martín
27 September	Spain; Tafalla	Illart Zuazubiskar	Tania Calvo
27 September	Spain; Tafalla	Joan Martí Bennassar	Eukene Larrarte Arteaga
1 October	Kazakhstan; Nur-Sultan	Assylkhan Turar	—
1 October	Kazakhstan; Nur-Sultan	Sultanmurat Miraliyev	—
1 October	Kazakhstan; Nur-Sultan	Artyom Zakharov	—
23 October	Poland; Pruszków	Filip Prokopyszyn	Łucja Pietrzak
23 October	Poland; Pruszków	Stanisław Aniołkowski	Marta Jaskulska
23 October	Poland; Pruszków	Daniel Staniszewski	Karolina Karasiewicz
24 October	Switzerland —	Claudio Imhof	Aline Seitz
24 October	Switzerland —	Simon Vitzthum	Léna Mettraux
24 October	Switzerland —	Lukas Rüegg	Michelle Andres
29 October	Austria; Wien	Andreas Graf	Verena Eberhardt
29 October	Austria; Wien	Stefan Mastaller	Kathrin Schweinberger
29 October	Austria; Wien	Felix Ritzinger	Nadja Heigl
31 October	Russia; Saint Petersburg	Ilia Schegolkov	Gulnaz Badykova
31 October	Russia; Saint Petersburg	Savva Novikov	Natalia Studenikina
31 October	Russia; Saint Petersburg	Viacheslav Ivanov	Daria Malkova
8 November	Japan; TBD	Eiya Hashimoto	Yumi Kajihara
8 November	Japan; TBD	Ryo Chikatani	Kie Furuyama
8 November	Japan; TBD	Ken Sato	Tsuyaka Uchino
8 November	Romania; Plovdiv (Bulgaria)	Daniel Crista	—
8 November	Romania; Plovdiv (Bulgaria)	Valentin Plesea	—
8 November	Romania; Plovdiv (Bulgaria)	Eduard-Michael Grosu	—
29 November	Mexico; Aguascalientes City	Ulises Alfredo Castillo	Lizbeth Salazar
29 November	Mexico; Aguascalientes City	Ivan Carbajal	Mariana Valadez
29 November	Mexico; Aguascalientes City	Fabrizio Von Nacher	Maria Gaxiola
29 November	New Zealand; Cambridge	Mark Stewart	Nicole Shields
29 November	New Zealand; Cambridge	Aaron Gate	Jessie Hodges
29 November	New Zealand; Cambridge	Campbell Stewart	Bryony Botha
6 December	Israel; Tel Aviv	Vladislav Logionov	Gali Wallach
6 December	Israel; Tel Aviv	Roy Rubinstein	Antonina Reznikov
6 December	Israel; Tel Aviv	Amir Danel	—
20 December	Australia; Brisbane	Jensen Plowright	—
20 December	Australia; Brisbane	Kurt Eather	—
20 December	Australia; Brisbane	Connor Leahy	—
10 February	Czech Republic; Prague	Daniel Babor	—
10 February	Czech Republic; Prague	Nicolas Pietrula	—
10 February	Czech Republic; Prague	Jan Kraus	—
5 March	Ukraine; Lviv (2021 Edition)	Roman Gladysh	Hanna Solovey
5 March	Ukraine; Lviv (2021 Edition)	Mykyta Yakovlev	Kseniia Fedotova
5 March	Ukraine; Lviv (2021 Edition)	Vladyslav Pohorelov	Viktoria Alieksieieva
20 March	Uzbekistan; Tashkent	Muradjan Khalmuratov	Olga Zabelinskaya
20 March	Uzbekistan; Tashkent	Damir Zabirov	Nafosat Kozieva
20 March	Uzbekistan; Tashkent	Aleksey Fomovskiy	Yanina Kuskova

=== Scratch ===
Date	Venue	Podium (Men)	Podium (Women)
15 March	Trinidad and Tobago; Couva	Jabari Whiteman	—
15 March	Trinidad and Tobago; Couva	Darius Beckles	—
15 March	Trinidad and Tobago; Couva	Sheldon Ramjit	—
12 July	Slovakia; Prešov	Štefan Michalička	Alžbeta Bačíková
12 July	Slovakia; Prešov	Martin Chren	Petra Machálková
12 July	Slovakia; Prešov	Tomáš Bažík	—
26 July	Czech Republic; Plzeň	—	Petra Ševčíková
26 July	Czech Republic; Plzeň	—	Kateřina Kohoutková
26 July	Czech Republic; Plzeň	—	Jarmila Machačová
15 August	Finland; Helsinki	Juho Ala-Peijari	Anna Ronkainen
15 August	Finland; Helsinki	Antti Träskelin	Pia Pensaari
15 August	Finland; Helsinki	Juhana Hietala	Ida Sten
29 August	Ireland; Dublin	Mark Downey	Lara Gillespie
29 August	Ireland; Dublin	Cian Keogh	Mia Griffin
29 August	Ireland; Dublin	Michael O'Loughlin	Kelly Murphy
2 September	Ukraine; Lviv (2020 Edition)	Roman Gladysh	Tetyana Klimchenko
2 September	Ukraine; Lviv (2020 Edition)	Kyrylo Tsarenko	Anna Nahirna
2 September	Ukraine; Lviv (2020 Edition)	Vitaliy Novakovskyi	Viktoriya Bondar
13 September	Greece; Athens	Christos Volikakis	Argyro Milaki
13 September	Greece; Athens	Zafeiris Volikakis	Sofia Liodaki
13 September	Greece; Athens	Kiriakos Papastamatakis	Athina Chatzistyli
20 September	Hungary; Budapest	Krisztián Lovassy	Johanna Kitti Borissza
20 September	Hungary; Budapest	Viktor Filutás	Tamara László
20 September	Hungary; Budapest	Gergő Orosz	Csenge Honos
26 September	Czech Republic; Brno	Tomáš Bárta	—
26 September	Czech Republic; Brno	Daniel Babor	—
26 September	Czech Republic; Brno	Pavel Kelemen	—
27 September	Spain; Tafalla	Xavier Cañellas	Tania Calvo
27 September	Spain; Tafalla	Raúl García	Marga López
27 September	Spain; Tafalla	Erik Martorell	Laura Rodríguez Cordero
1 October	Kazakhstan; Nur-Sultan	Artyom Zakharov	—
1 October	Kazakhstan; Nur-Sultan	Sultanmurat Miraliyev	—
1 October	Kazakhstan; Nur-Sultan	Alisher Zhumakan	—
23 October	Poland; Pruszków	Tobiasz Pawlak	Daria Pikulik
23 October	Poland; Pruszków	Damian Papierski	Nikol Płosaj
23 October	Poland; Pruszków	Filip Maciejuk	Łucja Pietrzak
24 October	Switzerland —	Simon Vitzthum	Aline Seitz
24 October	Switzerland —	Lukas Rüegg	Léna Mettraux
24 October	Switzerland —	Mauro Schmid	Michelle Andres
28 October	Italy; Ascoli Piceno	Francesco Lamon	Silvia Valsecchi
28 October	Italy; Ascoli Piceno	Matteo Donegà	Martina Fidanza
28 October	Italy; Ascoli Piceno	Liam Bertazzo	Martina Alzini
29 October	Austria; Wien	Daniel Auer	Verena Eberhardt
29 October	Austria; Wien	Felix Ritzinger	Kathrin Schweinberger
29 October	Austria; Wien	Andreas Müller	Veronika Windisch
1 November	Russia; Saint Petersburg	Gleb Syritsa	Diana Klimova
1 November	Russia; Saint Petersburg	Sergey Rostovtsev	Natalia Studenikina
1 November	Russia; Saint Petersburg	Maxim Piskunov	Maria Novolodskaya
8 November	Japan; TBD	Eiya Hashimoto	Yumi Kajihara
8 November	Japan; TBD	Minori Shimmura	Tsuyaka Uchino
8 November	Japan; TBD	Kazushige Kuboki	Nao Suzuki
8 November	Romania; Plovdiv (Bulgaria)	Daniel Crista	—
8 November	Romania; Plovdiv (Bulgaria)	Valentin Plesea	—
8 November	Romania; Plovdiv (Bulgaria)	Eduard-Michael Grosu	—
29 November	Mexico; Aguascalientes City	Fabrizio Von Nacher	Mariana Valadez
29 November	Mexico; Aguascalientes City	Ivan Carbajal	Maria Gaxiola
29 November	Mexico; Aguascalientes City	Roberto Serrano	Jessica Bonilla
29 November	New Zealand; Cambridge; 2020 Edition	Mark Stewart	McKenzie Milne
29 November	New Zealand; Cambridge; 2020 Edition	Aaron Gate	Jessie Hodges
29 November	New Zealand; Cambridge; 2020 Edition	Thomas Sexton	Nicole Shields
6 December	Israel; Tel Aviv	Guy Weinberg	Gali Wallach
6 December	Israel; Tel Aviv	Alon Yogev	Antonina Reznikov
6 December	Israel; Tel Aviv	Rotem Tene	—
20 December	Australia; Brisbane	Josh Duffy	Lauren Perry
20 December	Australia; Brisbane	Graeme Frislie	Shannon McCurley
20 December	Australia; Brisbane	Jensen Plowright	Bree Hargreave
27 February	New Zealand; Invercargill; 2021 Edition	George Jackson	Olivia Ray
27 February	New Zealand; Invercargill; 2021 Edition	Nicholas Kergozou	Mckenzie Milne
27 February	New Zealand; Invercargill; 2021 Edition	Campbell Stewart	Rylee McMullen
5 March	Ukraine; Lviv (2021 Edition)	Andrii Hanzin	Kateryna Velychko
5 March	Ukraine; Lviv (2021 Edition)	Oleksandr Kryvych	Tetyana Klimchenko
5 March	Ukraine; Lviv (2021 Edition)	Roman Gladysh	Viktoriya Bondar
20 March	Uzbekistan; Tashkent	Dmitriy Sirko	Yanina Kuskova
20 March	Uzbekistan; Tashkent	Aleksey Fomovskiy	Ekaterina Knebeleva
20 March	Uzbekistan; Tashkent	Edem Eminov	Diana Adelshinova
26 March	Israel; Tel Aviv (2021 Edition)	Oded Kogut	Gali Wallach
26 March	Israel; Tel Aviv (2021 Edition)	Iftah Shoshani	Orat Bash
26 March	Israel; Tel Aviv (2021 Edition)	Rotem Tene	Gali Weinberg

=== Individual Pursuit ===
Date	Venue	Podium (Men)	Podium (Women)
12 July	Slovakia; Prešov	Štefan Michalička	Tereza Medveďová
12 July	Slovakia; Prešov	Lukáš Kubiš	Petra Machálková
12 July	Slovakia; Prešov	Pavol Rodver	—
12 July	Croatia; Zagreb	Viktor Potočki	Mateja Posavec
12 July	Croatia; Zagreb	Filip Kvasina	Barbara Horvat
12 July	Croatia; Zagreb	Carlo Jurišević	Alessandra Musa
26 July	Czech Republic; Plzeň	—	Kateřina Kohoutková
26 July	Czech Republic; Plzeň	—	Jarmila Machačová
26 July	Czech Republic; Plzeň	—	Petra Ševčíková
29 August	Ireland; Dublin	Michael O'Loughlin	Kelly Murphy
29 August	Ireland; Dublin	Lindsay Watson	Lara Gillespie
29 August	Ireland; Dublin	Cian Keogh	Mia Griffin
2 September	Ukraine; Lviv (2020 Edition)	Vitaliy Hryniv	Anna Nahirna
2 September	Ukraine; Lviv (2020 Edition)	Roman Gladysh	Viktoriia Yaroshenko
2 September	Ukraine; Lviv (2020 Edition)	Volodymyr Dzhus	Hanna Solovey
3 September	Switzerland; Grenchen	Claudio Imhof	—
3 September	Switzerland; Grenchen	Cyrille Thièry	—
3 September	Switzerland; Grenchen	Alex Vogel	—
13 September	Greece; Athens	Christos Volikakis	Argyro Milaki
13 September	Greece; Athens	Panagiotis Karatsivis	Athina Chatzistyli
13 September	Greece; Athens	Zisis Soulios	Varvara Fasoi
20 September	Hungary; Budapest	Krisztián Lovassy	Johanna Kitti Borissza
20 September	Hungary; Budapest	Miklós Durucz	Szonja Kapott
20 September	Hungary; Budapest	Márton Solymosi	Tamara László
27 September	Spain; Tafalla	Eloy Teruel	Ziortza Isasi
27 September	Spain; Tafalla	Illart Zuazubiskar	Eukene Larrarte Arteaga
27 September	Spain; Tafalla	Erik Martorell	Maria Banlles Santamaria
1 October	Kazakhstan; Nur-Sultan	Sultanmurat Miraliyev	—
1 October	Kazakhstan; Nur-Sultan	Dmitriy Potapenko	—
1 October	Kazakhstan; Nur-Sultan	Igor Yussifov	—
29 October	Austria; Wien	Felix Ritzinger	Veronika Windisch
29 October	Austria; Wien	Daniel Auer	Kathrin Schweinberger
29 October	Austria; Wien	Stefan Mastaller	Nadja Heigl
2 November	Russia; Saint Petersburg	Lev Gonov	Tamara Dronova
2 November	Russia; Saint Petersburg	Gleb Syritsa	Natalia Studenikina
2 November	Russia; Saint Petersburg	Alexander Evtushenko	Inna Abaidullina
8 November	Japan; TBD	Ryo Chikatani	Yumi Kajihara
8 November	Japan; TBD	Kazushige Kuboki	Kie Furuyama
8 November	Japan; TBD	Koshin Adachi	Minami Uwano
8 November	Romania; Plovdiv (Bulgaria)	Daniel Crista	Maria-Ecaterina Stancu
8 November	Romania; Plovdiv (Bulgaria)	Valentin Plesea	Miriam Stan
8 November	Romania; Plovdiv (Bulgaria)	Carol-Eduard Novak	Ioana-Theodora Crăciun-Bunda
29 November	Mexico; Aguascalientes City	Ulises Alfredo Castillo	Lizbeth Salazar
29 November	Mexico; Aguascalientes City	Edibaldo Maldonado	Yareli Acevedo
29 November	Mexico; Aguascalientes City	Tomás Aguirre Garza	Jessica Bonilla
6 December	Costa Rica; San José	Javier Alvarado Méndez	Monserrat Segura
6 December	Costa Rica; San José	Carlos Piedra Quesada	—
6 December	Costa Rica; San José	Roger Aguilar Camacho	—
6 December	Israel; Tel Aviv	Alon Yogev	Gali Wallach
6 December	Israel; Tel Aviv	Guy Weinberg	Rotem Gafinovitz
6 December	Israel; Tel Aviv	Vladislav Logionov	—
17 December	Australia; Brisbane	Connor Leahy	Georgia Whitehouse
17 December	Australia; Brisbane	Liam Walsh	Amber Pate
17 December	Australia; Brisbane	Daniel Gandy	Lauren Perry
10 February	Czech Republic; Prague	Nicolas Pietrula	—
10 February	Czech Republic; Prague	Jan Kraus	—
10 February	Czech Republic; Prague	Daniel Babor	—
25 February	New Zealand; Invercargill; 2021 Edition	Aaron Gate	Bryony Botha
25 February	New Zealand; Invercargill; 2021 Edition	Mark Stewart	Jaime Nielsen
25 February	New Zealand; Invercargill; 2021 Edition	Regan Gough	Kirstie James
5 March	Ukraine; Lviv (2021 Edition)	Mykyta Yakovlev	Tetyana Klimchenko
5 March	Ukraine; Lviv (2021 Edition)	Oleksander Smetaniuk	Anna Nahirna
5 March	Ukraine; Lviv (2021 Edition)	Oleksandr Kryvych	Viktoria Yaroshenko
20 March	Uzbekistan; Tashkent	Danil Evdokimov	Yanina Kuskova
20 March	Uzbekistan; Tashkent	Muradjan Khalmuratov	Madina Kakhkhorova
20 March	Uzbekistan; Tashkent	Damir Zabirov	Evgeniya Golotina
26 March	Israel; Tel Aviv (2021 Edition)	Vladislav Logionov	Gali Wallach
26 March	Israel; Tel Aviv (2021 Edition)	Roy Rubinstein	—
26 March	Israel; Tel Aviv (2021 Edition)	Alon Yogev	—

=== Madison ===
Date	Venue	Podium (Men)	Podium (Women)
11 July	South Korea; Yangyang County	Park Sang-hoon; Cha Dong-heon	Na Ah-reum; Suji Jang
11 July	South Korea; Yangyang County	Park Kyoung-ho; Kim Kook-hyun	Gu Sung-eun; Kim Hyun-ji
11 July	South Korea; Yangyang County	Kim Eu-ro; Jang Hun	Lee Joo-hee; Song Min-ji
2 September	Ukraine; Lviv (2020 Edition)	Roman Gladysh; Vitaliy Hryniv	Anna Nahirna; Viktoriya Bondar
2 September	Ukraine; Lviv (2020 Edition)	Maksym Vasilyev; Volodymyr Dzhus	Kseniia Fedotova; Viktoria Alieksieieva
2 September	Ukraine; Lviv (2020 Edition)	Andriy Hanzin; Mykyta Yakovlev	Solomiia Lukachuk; Tetyana Klimchenko
13 September	Greece; Athens	Christos Volikakis; Zafeiris Volikakis	—
13 September	Greece; Athens	Panagiotis Karatsivis; Vasilios Tsopouroglou	—
13 September	Greece; Athens	Konstantinos Konstantouras; Nikolaos Michail Drakkos	—
26 September	Czech Republic; Brno	René Smékal; Daniel Babor	—
26 September	Czech Republic; Brno	Jan Kraus; Denis Rugovac	—
26 September	Czech Republic; Brno	Jan Voneš; Nicolas Pietrula	—
1 October	Kazakhstan; Nur-Sultan	Artyom Zakharov; Dmitriy Potapenko	—
1 October	Kazakhstan; Nur-Sultan	Dmitriy Noskov; Ruslan Yelyubayev	—
1 October	Kazakhstan; Nur-Sultan	Assylkhan Turar; Gabiden Azen	—
4 October	Belarus; Minsk	Yauheni Karaliok; Mikhail Shemetau	Tatsiana Sharakova; Nastassia Kiptsikava
4 October	Belarus; Minsk	Raman Ramanau; Raman Tsishkou	Ina Savenka; Karalina Savenka
4 October	Belarus; Minsk	Kiryl Kavaliou; Mark Grinkevich	Aksana Salauyeva; Anastasiya Kolesava
23 October	Poland; Pruszków	Filip Prokopyszyn; Adrian Tekliński	Daria Pikulik; Wiktoria Pikulik
23 October	Poland; Pruszków	Jakub Lewandowski; Julian Kot	Karolina Karasiewicz; Patrycja Lorkowska
23 October	Poland; Pruszków	Bartosz Rudyk; Damian Sławek	Łucja Pietrzak; Nikol Płosaj
24 October	Switzerland —	—	Michelle Andres; Émeline Jacolino
24 October	Switzerland —	—	Fantine Fragnière; Léna Mettraux
24 October	Switzerland —	—	Viviane Trapp; Aline Seitz
29 October	Austria; Wien	Felix Ritzinger; Valentin Götzinger	—
29 October	Austria; Wien	Andreas Graf; Stefan Mastaller	—
29 October	Austria; Wien	Stefan Matzner; Andreas Müller	—
3 November	Russia; Saint Petersburg	Lev Gonov; Ivan Smirnov	Maria Novolodskaya; Gulnaz Badykova
3 November	Russia; Saint Petersburg	Nikita Bersenev; Gleb Syritsa	Diana Klimova; Tamara Dronova
3 November	Russia; Saint Petersburg	Artur Ershov; Andrey Sazanov	Olga Nikishina; Maria Rostovtseva
7 November	Denmark; Odense	Frederik Rodenberg; Niklas Larsen	Amalie Dideriksen; Trine Schmidt
7 November	Denmark; Odense	Julius Johansen; Tobias Aagaard Hansen	Amalie Winther Olsen; Michelle Lauge Quaade
7 November	Denmark; Odense	Anders Fynbo; Arne Birkemose	Ellen Hjøllund Klinge; Karoline Hemmsen
8 November	Japan; TBD	Ryo Chikatani; Keitaro Sawada	Yumi Kajihara; Kisato Nakamura
8 November	Japan; TBD	Eiya Hashimoto; Daiki Magosaki	Nao Suzuki; Kie Furuyama
8 November	Japan; TBD	Kazushige Kuboki; Minori Shimmura	Miho Yoshikawa; Tsuyaka Uchino
29 November	Mexico; Aguascalientes City	Ulises Alfredo Castillo; Ignacio Prado	Lizbeth Salazar; Victoria Velasco
29 November	Mexico; Aguascalientes City	Emiliano Mirafuentes; Eugenio Mirafuentes	Jessica Bonilla; Mariana Valadez
29 November	Mexico; Aguascalientes City	Ivan Carbajal; Salvador Lemus	Nicole Córdova Guerra; Yareli Acevedo
29 November	New Zealand; Cambridge	Aaron Gate; Campbell Stewart	Jessie Hodges; Rushlee Buchanan
29 November	New Zealand; Cambridge	Mark Stewart; Adrian Hegyvary	Ally Wollaston; Bryony Botha
29 November	New Zealand; Cambridge	Jordan Kerby; Regan Gough	McKenzie Milne; Olivia Ray
11 December	Switzerland; Aigle	Théry Schir; Robin Froidevaux	—
11 December	Switzerland; Aigle	Simon Vitzthum; Lukas Ruegg	—
11 December	Switzerland; Aigle	Tristan Marguet; Claudio Imhof	—
10 February	Czech Republic; Prague	—	Petra Ševčíková; Kateřina Kohoutková
10 February	Czech Republic; Prague	—	Jarmila Machačová; Dagmar Hejhalová
10 February	Czech Republic; Prague	—	Kristýna Burlová; Sabina Dzerengová
19 February	Switzerland; Grenchen	Robin Froidevaux; Théry Schir	—
19 February	Switzerland; Grenchen	Tristan Marguet; Simon Vitzthum	—
19 February	Switzerland; Grenchen	Cyrille Thièry; Valère Thiébaud	—
14 March	Ukraine; Lviv (2021 Edition)	Oleksandr Kryvych; Roman Gladysh	Anna Nahirna; Hanna Solovey
14 March	Ukraine; Lviv (2021 Edition)	Mykyta Yakovlev; Andrii Hanzin	Viktoriya Bondar; Kseniia Fedotova
14 March	Ukraine; Lviv (2021 Edition)	Vladyslav Pohorelov; Yaroslav Kozakov	Viktoria Yaroshenko; Sofia Shevchenko
20 March	Uzbekistan; Tashkent	Aleksey Fomovskiy; Danil Evdokimov	Yanina Kuskova; Margarita Misyurina
20 March	Uzbekistan; Tashkent	Muradjan Khalmuratov; Damir Zabirov	Nafosat Kozieva; Madina Kakhkhorova
20 March	Uzbekistan; Tashkent	Edem Eminov; Umidjon Bakhtiyorov	Anna Kuskova; Asal Rizaeva

=== Team Sprint ===
Date	Venue	Podium (Men)	Podium (Women)
3 July	Czech Republic; Prague	Matěj Bohuslávek; Jakub Šťastný; Martin Čechman	Sára Kaňkovská; Veronika Jaborníková
3 July	Czech Republic; Prague	Dominik Topinka; David Sojka; Tomáš Bábek	—
3 July	Czech Republic; Prague	Pavel Kelemen; Robin Wagner; Jiří Janošek	—
11 July	South Korea; Yangyang County	One Jun-oh; Jung Jea-hee; Han Dong-hyeon	Cho Sun-young; Kwon So-yeon; Jeong Seol-hwa
11 July	South Korea; Yangyang County	Kim Cheng-su; Oh Min-jae; Choi Woo-rim	Kim Won-Gyeong; Choi Seul-gi; Kwon Serim
11 July	South Korea; Yangyang County	Junseo Moon-shin; Son Je-yong; Kim Woo-gyeom	Lee Hye-jin; Kim Soo-hyun; Jung Da-Eun
18 July	United StatesBreinigsville, Pennsylvania	Tommy Quinn; Geneway Tang; Andrew Chu; Jamie Alvord	McKenna McKee; Mandy Marquardt; Allyson Wasielewski
18 July	United StatesBreinigsville, Pennsylvania	Dyllon Gunsolus; Zachariah McClendon; Timo Burdarz	Jennifer Wagner; Kayla Hankins; Keely Kortman
18 July	United StatesBreinigsville, Pennsylvania	John Bowie; Andrew Carlberg; Alex Siegel	Mia Deye; Danielle Shumskas; Stephanie Lawrence
2 September	Ukraine; Lviv	Vladyslav Denysenko; Dmytro Stovbetskyi; Tadei-Ivan Chebanets; Bohdan Danylchuk	Olena Starikova; Lyubov Basova; Oleksandra Logvynyuk; Anna Lutsyk
2 September	Ukraine; Lviv	Yurii Mudryi; Yehor Korobov; Oleksandr Kryvych; Mykhaylo-Yaroslav Dydko	Alla Biletska; Yulia Skoryshchenko; Solomiia Lukachuk; Anastasia Ivko
2 September	Ukraine; Lviv	Artem Avdalyan; Andriy Nizelskiy; Andriy Rozghoniuk; Oleksander Smetaniuk	Snizhana Farshchuk; Bohdana Soltys; Valeriia Zaichuk
13 September	Greece; Athens	Theocharis Tsiantos; Zafeiris Volikakis; Sotirios Bretas	—
13 September	Greece; Athens	Dimitrios Voukelatos; Ioannis Kalogeropoulos; Gerasimos Spiliotopoulos	—
13 September	Greece; Athens	Akylas Gerakakis; Vasileios Mavrigiannakis; Ilias Paterakis	—
20 September	Hungary; Budapest	Dániel Hajós; Krisztián Lovassy; Viktor Filutás	Johanna Kitti Borissza; Petra Jászapáti
20 September	Hungary; Budapest	Peter Muller; Patrik Rómeó Lovassy; Bálint Csengői	Boglárka Sáry; Csenge Honos
20 September	Hungary; Budapest	Bence Oláh; Zsolt Imre; Gergő Orosz	Tamara László; Niké Péteri
27 September	Spain; Tafalla	Sergio Aliaga; Alfonso Cabello; Juan Peralta	—
27 September	Spain; Tafalla	Itmar Esteban Herraiz; Gerard García Gómez; Manel Usach Sancho	—
27 September	Spain; Tafalla	Andrés Fuentes Avellano; Raúl García; Javier Serrano	—
1 October	Kazakhstan; Nur-Sultan	Maxim Nalyotov; Sergey Ponomaryov; Viktor Golov; Alexandr Safarov	—
1 October	Kazakhstan; Nur-Sultan	Andrey Chugay; Pavel Vorzhev; Dmitriy Rezanov	—
1 October	Kazakhstan; Nur-Sultan	Arlanbek Zhailganov; Sergey Karmazhakov; Ramis Dinmukhametov	—
4 October	Belarus; Minsk	Yauhen Veramchuk; Aliaksandr Hlova; Andrei Lukashevich	Darya Dziakola; Yuliya Manets; Taisa Naskovich
4 October	Belarus; Minsk	Uladzislau Tsikhanau; Dzmitry Ivanchanka; Artsiom Zaitsau	Angelina Shcherbakova; Hanna Vasilkova; Aksana Salauyeva
4 October	Belarus; Minsk	Pavel Papruha; Gleb Vishnev; Ivan Zheuno	Polina Milenkaya; Dziyana Miadzvetskaya; Anhelina Krasko
10 October	Ireland; Dublin	Harvey Barnes; James Glasgow; Liam Collins	Autumn Collins; Deirbhle Ivory
10 October	Ireland; Dublin	Keith Meghen; John Caffrey; Eoin Mullen	Almha Russell Kissane; Nikki Taggart
10 October	Ireland; Dublin	Callum O'Toole; Fionn Sheridan; Dmitri Griffin	Sofie Loscher; Susie Mitchell
23 October	Poland; Pruszków	Krzysztof Maksel; Mateusz Rudyk; Rafał Sarnecki; Cezary Łączkowski	Marlena Karwacka; Nikola Sibiak; Nikola Seremak
23 October	Poland; Pruszków	Mateusz Miłek; Maciej Bielecki; Konrad Burawski; Jakub Kozicki	Urszula Łoś; Maja Tracka; Natalia Głowacka
23 October	Poland; Pruszków	Gracjan Dąbrowski; Radosław Laskowski; Michał Rząca	Natalia Wężyk; Paulina Petri; Julia Marciniak
30 October	Russia; Saint Petersburg	Kirill Lii; Pavel Yakushevskiy; Alexey Tkachev	Ekaterina Rogovaya; Daria Shmeleva; Anastasia Voynova
30 October	Russia; Saint Petersburg	Ivan Gladyshev; Denis Dmitriev; Alexander Sharapov; Mikhail Yakovlev	Natalia Antonova; Ekaterina Gnidenko; Serafima Grishina; Ksenia Andreeva
30 October	Russia; Saint Petersburg	Daniil Komkov; Alexander Dubchenko; Dmitriy Nesterov; Pavel Rostov	Polina Vashchenko; Anastasaia Sukhareva; Alina Lysenko; Anna Shatalova
8 November	Japan; TBD	Hitoshi Arakawa; Kohei Terasaki; Kento Yamasaki	Fuko Umekawa; Yuka Kobayashi; Riyu Ohta
8 November	Japan; TBD	Shinji Nakano; Tomohiro Fukaya; Yudai Nitta; Yoshitaku Nagasako	Sakura Yamamoto; Ayaka Narumi; Yuka Matsui
8 November	Japan; TBD	Kyohei Shinzan; Yuta Obara; Koyu Matsui	—
8 November	Romania; Plovdiv (Bulgaria)	Norbert Szabo; Dániel Mădăraș; Adi Narcis Marcu	—
8 November	Romania; Plovdiv (Bulgaria)	Daniel Crista; Valentin Plesea; George Porumb	—
8 November	Romania; Plovdiv (Bulgaria)	Leonard Barbu; Mihnea Cristian; Csaba Bartha	—
29 November	Mexico; Aguascalientes City	Edgar Verdugo; Alejandro Resendez Landa; Juan Carlos Ruíz Terán	Melanie Janet Ramírez Noriega; Jessica Salazar; Daniela Gaxiola
29 November	Mexico; Aguascalientes City	Eduardo Vargas Ramos; Pablo Maximiliano Garduza Santiago; Juan Ignacio Contreras Sánchez	—
29 November	Mexico; Aguascalientes City	—	—
18 December	Australia; Brisbane	Matthew Glaetzer; Nathan Hart; Matthew Richardson	Des'ree Barnes; Jacqui Mengler-Mohr; Kristina Clonan
18 December	Australia; Brisbane	Leigh Hoffman; James Brister; Carlos Carismo	Kalinda Robinson; Tyler Putzika; Selina Ho
18 December	Australia; Brisbane	Byron Davies; Sam Gallagher; Ned Pollard	Claudia Marcks; Lily Stratford; Felice Beitzel

=== Team Pursuit ===
Date	Venue	Podium (Men)	Podium (Women)
11 July	South Korea; Yangyang County	Bang Seon-hoe; Im Jae-yeon; Kim Hyeon-seok; Kim Sang-pyo	Na Ah-reum; Yun Hyek-yeong; Suji Jang; Kim Minhwa
11 July	South Korea; Yangyang County	Shin Dong-in; Hwang Beom-yeon; Bae Seung-been; Ahn Hui-sang	Lee Ju-mi; Kang Hyun-kyung; Kim Ok-hui; Kim Hyowŏn
11 July	South Korea; Yangyang County	Park Keon-woo; Kim Eu-ro; Jang Hun; Park Sang-hong	Jang Ha-ye; Ha Ji-eun; Park Seo-hui; Shin Ji-eun
12 July	Croatia; Zagreb	—	Ana Marija Galeković; Lucija Petrović; Mia Vrhar
12 July	Croatia; Zagreb	—	Paula Galeković; Iva Remeta; Dunja Ambrošić
12 July	Croatia; Zagreb	—	—
26 July	Czech Republic; Plzeň	—	Jarmila Machačová; Kateřina Kohoutková; Petra Ševčíková; Kristýna Burlová
26 July	Czech Republic; Plzeň	—	Dagmar Hejhalová; Sabina Džerengová; Gabriela Bártová; Barbora Parmová
26 July	Czech Republic; Plzeň	—	—
2 September	Ukraine; Lviv	Roman Gladysh; Maksym Vasilyev; Volodymyr Dzhus; Vitaliy Hryniv; Illya Klepikov	Viktoriya Bondar; Kseniia Fedotova; Viktoria Alieksieieva; Solomiia Lukachuk; Viktoria Yaroshenko
2 September	Ukraine; Lviv	Oleksandr Kryvych; Vladyslav Shcherban; Andriy Hanzin; Oleksander Smetaniuk; Mykyta Yakovlev	Bohdana Soltys; Snizhana Farshchuk; Valeriia Zaichuk; Marina Varenyk
2 September	Ukraine; Lviv	Artem Avdalyan; Daniil Nikulin; Nazar Pokoiovyi; Yaroslav Kozakov	Kateryna Velychko; Valeriia Kaliuha; Anna Lutsyk; Irina Shimanska; Daryna Beliak
13 September	Greece; Athens	Christos Volikakis; Antonios Spanopoulos; Zisis Soulios; Orestis Raptis	—
13 September	Greece; Athens	Michail Kortsidakis; Ioannis Panigyrakis; Dimitrios Skintzis; Marios Kortsidakis	—
13 September	Greece; Athens	Panagiotis Sifakis; Konstantinos Konstantouras; Andreas Kalathenos; Nikolaos Michail Drakos	—
27 September	Spain; Tafalla	José María García Soriano; Alberto Pérez Díaz; Víctor Manuel Romero Buendía; Eloy Teruel	—
27 September	Spain; Tafalla	Pablo García; Raúl García; Alberto Serrano Álvarez; Javier Serrano Rodríguez	—
27 September	Spain; Tafalla	Xabier Mikel Azparren; Iñaki Diaz; Iñaki Lekuona; Aritz Urra	—
1 October	Kazakhstan; Nur-Sultan	Sultanmurat Miraliyev; Alisher Zhumakan; Dmitriy Potapenko; Ramis Dinmukhametov	—
1 October	Kazakhstan; Nur-Sultan	Assylkhan Turar; Igor Yussifov; Bauyrzhan Zhaparuly; Gabiden Azen	—
1 October	Kazakhstan; Nur-Sultan	Andrey Betts; Sergey Karmazhakov; Dmitriy Noskov; Ruslan Yelyubayev	—
4 October	Belarus; Minsk	Raman Tsishkou; Yauheni Akhramenka; Aliaksei Shmantsar; Kiryl Prymakou	Anhelina Krasko; Hanna Kavaliova; Anastasiya Bahdanava; Katsiaryna Buchatskaya
4 October	Belarus; Minsk	Yauheni Karaliok; Mikhail Shemetau; Mark Grinkevich; Kiryl Kavaliou	Ina Savenka; Karalina Savenka; Anastasiya Samonchyk; Aksana Kalinouskaya
4 October	Belarus; Minsk	Dzianis Mazur; Artur Kiryievich; Yauhen Sobal; Yan Viarshynin	—
10 October	Ireland; Dublin	Andre Grennell; Cian Keogh; Ryan Byrne; Will Ryan	Autumn Collins; Jennifer Bates; Caoimhe O'Brien; Deirbhle Ivory
10 October	Ireland; Dublin	David O'Sullivan; Lindsay Watson; Cathir Doyle; Aaron Wade	Sofie Loscher; Deborah Madden; Claire Ní Reachtagáin; Susie Mitchell
10 October	Ireland; Dublin	Jason Kenny; Sean Landers; Conor Murnane; Rhys Kenny	Keela MacHale; Grace Irvine; Róisín Kennedy; Elizabeth Kent
23 October	Poland; Pruszków	Daniel Staniszewski; Alan Banaszek; Norbert Banaszek; Tobiasz Pawlak	Karolina Karasiewicz; Patrycja Lorkowska; Karolina Kumięga; Paulina Pastuszek; Natalia Krześlak
23 October	Poland; Pruszków	Damian Papierski; Karol Wawrzyniak; Stanisław Aniołkowski; Szymon Krawczyk	Nikol Płosaj; Karolina Lipiejko; Tamara Szalińska; Wiktoria Polak
23 October	Poland; Pruszków	Radosław Frątczak; Igor Sęk; Mateusz Sawicki; Łukasz Rykowski; Adam Woźniak	Wiktoria Milda; Iga Wiklińska; Julia Włodarczyk; Karolina Urban
30 October	Russia; Saint Petersburg	Nikita Bersenev; Ivan Smirnov; Lev Gonov; Gleb Syritsa	Inna Abaidulina; Alena Ivachenko; Valeria Valgonen; Taisia Churenkova
30 October	Russia; Saint Petersburg	Egor Igoshev; Ivan Novolodskiy; Ilia Schegolkov; Vlas Shichkin	Gulnaz Badykova; Diana Klimova; Maria Averina; Natalia Studenikina; Tamara Dronova
30 October	Russia; Saint Petersburg	Sergey Malnev; Arseny Nikiforov; Aleksandr Smirnov; Dmitri Sokolov	Anastasia Lukashenko; Daria Malkova; Anastasia Kutsenko; Sofia Balaeva; Valeriya Zakharkina
8 November	Japan; TBD	Eiya Hashimoto; Ryo Chikatani; Daiki Magosaki; Keitaro Sawada	Minami Uwano; Kisato Nakamura; Nao Suzuki; Kie Furuyama
8 November	Japan; TBD	Yoshihiro Tanase; Koshin Adachi; Jo Hibino; Hiroki Edamura	—
8 November	Japan; TBD	Naoki Kojima; Shun Takahashi; Yuto Shono; Ryuma Henmi	—
8 November	Romania; Plovdiv (Bulgaria)	Daniel Crista; Valentin Plesea; George Porumb	—
8 November	Romania; Plovdiv (Bulgaria)	Norbert Szabo; Dániel Mădăraș; Adi Narcis Marcu	—
8 November	Romania; Plovdiv (Bulgaria)	Leonard Barbu; Mihnea Cristian; Csaba Bartha	—
29 November	Mexico; Aguascalientes City	Ulises Alfredo Castillo; Edibaldo Maldonado; Tomás Aguirre Garza; Ricardo Carreon	—
29 November	Mexico; Aguascalientes City	Ricardo Peya Salas; Alejandro Madueño Amador; Emiliano Estrada Portillo; Ivan Carbajal	—
29 November	Mexico; Aguascalientes City	Salvador Lemus; Uriel Omar Espinoza López; Juan Daniel Armenta Vázquez; Rodrigo Romero Hernández	—
16 December	Australia; Brisbane	Daniel Gandy; Ben Harvey; Kurt Eather; Rohan Heydon Smith; Kai Chapman; Zachary Marshall	Josie Talbot; Georgia Whitehouse; Emily Watts; Lucie Fitys; Chloe Heffernan
16 December	Australia; Brisbane	Dalton Stretton; Jack Menzies; Will Eaves; Josh Duffy	—
16 December	Australia; Brisbane	—	—
10 February	Czech Republic; Prague	Pavel Kelemen; Jan Kraus; Nicolas Pietrula; Jan Voneš	—
10 February	Czech Republic; Prague	Daniel Babor; Marek Dolníček; René Smékal; Filip Řeha	—
10 February	Czech Republic; Prague	—	—

== See also ==
- 2007 in track cycling
- 2008 in track cycling
