= Denis Rugovac =

Czech cyclist (born 1993)

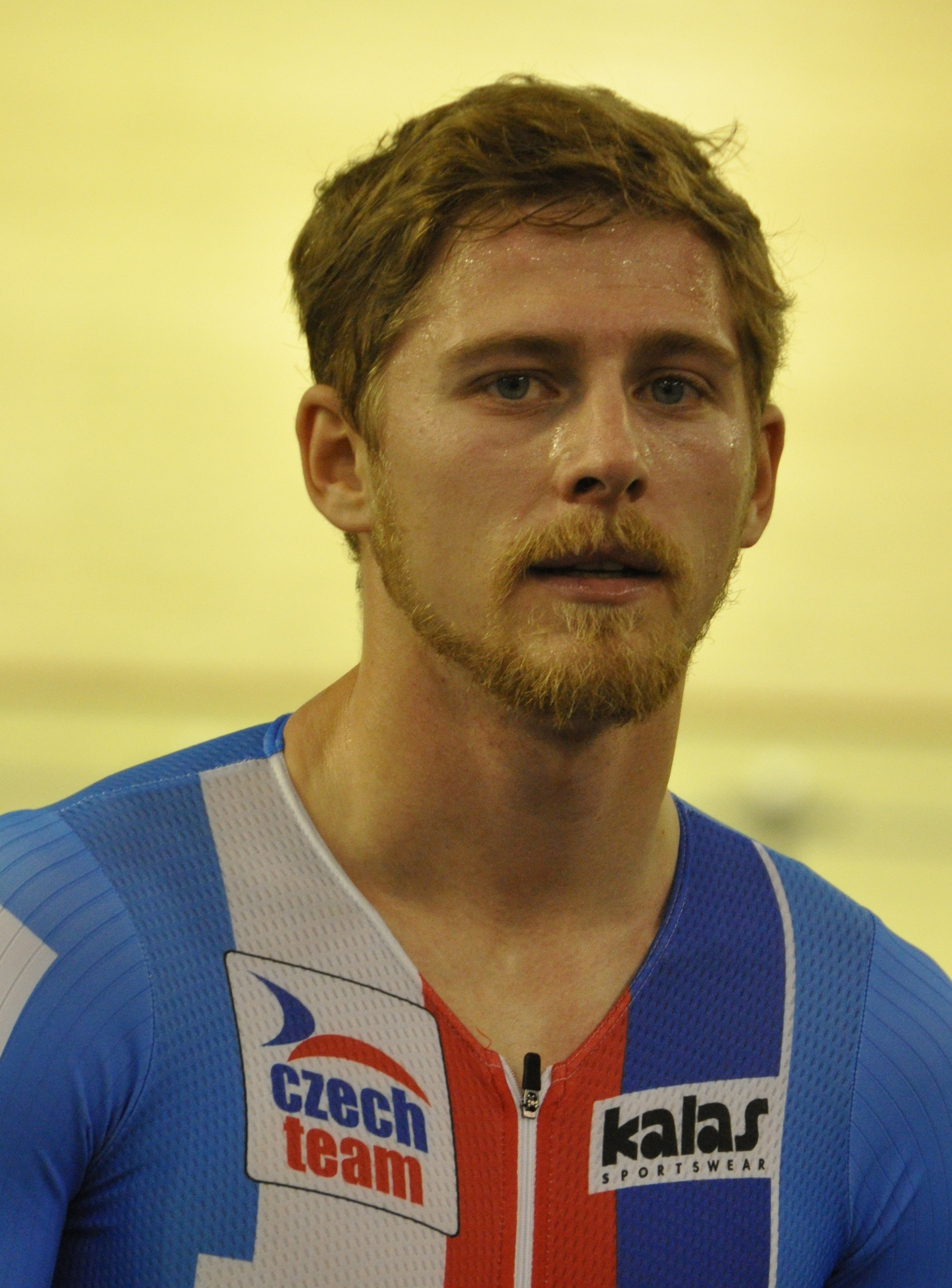
- Rugovac in 2018

Personal information
- Born: 3 April 1993 (age 33) Plzeň, Czech Republic
- Height: 1.81 m (5 ft 11 in)
- Weight: 69 kg (152 lb)

Cycling career
- Sport: Cycling
- Current team: TJ Favorit Brno
- Disciplines: Road; Track
- Role: Rider

Amateur teams
- 2018: Favorit Racing
- 2021–2022: Team Dukla Praha
- 2023: AC Sparta Praha
- 2024–: TJ Favorit Brno

Professional teams
- 2012–2015: ASC Dukla Praha
- 2016: AC Sparta Praha
- 2019: TUFO–Pardus Prostějov
- 2020: AC Sparta Praha

Denis Rugovac (born 3 April 1993) is a Czech road and track cyclist, who currently rides for club team TJ Favorit Brno. He competed at the 2018 and 2020 UEC European Track Championships.

Rugovac qualified for the 2024 Summer Olympics, just months after a life-threatening crash during a race. He competed in the Madison with Jan Voneš, where they finished in 7th place.

== Major results ==
=== Track ===
2011
1st Madison, National Junior ack Championships (with Jan Kraus)
2013
3rd Team pursuit, European Under-23 Championships
2014
National Championships

1st Team pursuit (with Jan Kraus, Nicolas Pietrula & Michael Kohout)
2nd Points race

2016
2nd Madison, National Championships
2017
National Championships

2nd Team pursuit
3rd Points race
3rd Individual pursuit

2018
National Championships

2nd Points race
2nd Team pursuit
3rd Scratch

2019
3rd Team pursuit, National Championships
2020
2nd Madison, National Championships
2021
National Championships

1st Individual pursuit
1st Madison (with Jan Voneš)
1st Points race
1st Omnium
1st Team pursuit

2022
1st Madison (with Jan Voneš), National Championships
2023
1st Madison (with Jan Voneš), National Championships
2024
7th Madison (with Jan Voneš), Summer Olympics

=== Road ===
2009
3rd Road race, European Youth Summer Olympic Festival
2013
4th Time trial, National Under-23 Championships
2019
10th V4 Special Series Debrecen–Ibrany
2020
9th GP Slovakia
