= Roman Vassilenkov =

Kazakhstani cyclist (born 1996)

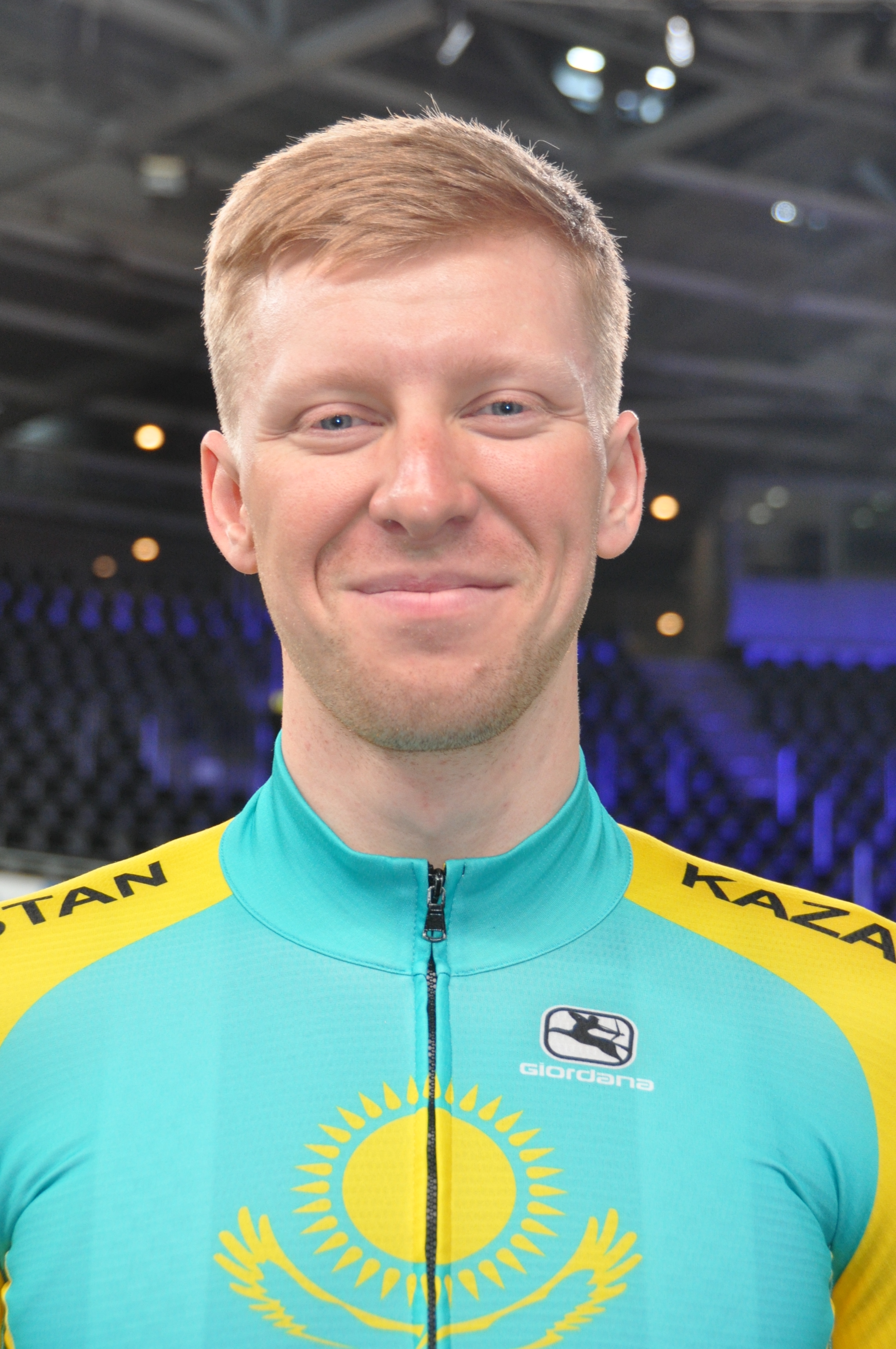
- Vassilenkov in 2020

Personal information
- Born: 8 October 1996 (age 30) Saran, Kazakhstan

Cycling career
- Sport: Cycling
- Disciplines: Road; Track
- Role: Rider

Professional team
- 2015–2020: Track Team Astana
Medal record
Men's track cycling
Representing Kazakhstan
Asian Championships
Bronze medal – third place	2019 Jakarta	Team pursuit
Bronze medal – third place	2020 Jincheon	Points race
Bronze medal – third place	2020 Jincheon	Madison

Roman Vassilenkov (born 8 October 1996) is a Kazakhstani racing cyclist. He rode in the men's points race at the 2020 UCI Track Cycling World Championships.

== Major results ==
2014
1st Individual pursuit, Asian Track Championships
2017
1st Team pursuit, Asian Indoor and Martial Arts Games
1st Elimination race, National Track Championships
3rd Six Days of Turin
2019
1st Madison, National Track Championships (with Alisher Zhumakan)
3rd Team pursuit, Asian Track Championships
4th Overall Tour of Kayseri
6th Grand Prix Erciyes
2020
Asian Track Championships

3rd Points race
3rd Madison

2021
9th GP Manavgat
10th Grand Prix Alanya
