= 2020 UCI Track Cycling World Championships – Men's points race =

Men's points race at the 2020 UCI Track Cycling World Championships
- Venue: Velodrom
- Location: Berlin, Germany
- Dates: 28 February
- Competitors: 23 from 23 nations
- Winning points: 58

Medalists
gold medal	Corbin Strong	New Zealand
silver medal	Sebastián Mora	Spain
bronze medal	Roy Eefting	Netherlands

The Men's points race competition at the 2020 UCI Track Cycling World Championships was held on 28 February 2020.

== Results ==
The race was started at 18:32.

Rank	Name	Nation	Lap points	Sprint points	Total points
1st place, gold medalist(s)	Corbin Strong	New Zealand	40	18	58
2nd place, silver medalist(s)	Sebastián Mora	Spain	20	20	40
3rd place, bronze medalist(s)	Roy Eefting	Netherlands	20	16	36
4	Wojciech Pszczolarski	Poland	20	12	32
5	Viktor Manakov	Russia	20	9	29
6	Raman Ramanau	Belarus	20	6	26
7	Kenny De Ketele	Belgium	0	20	20
8	Bryan Coquard	France	0	13	13
9	Michele Scartezzini	Italy	0	12	12
10	Cyrille Thièry	Switzerland	0	12	12
11	Ignacio Sarabia	Mexico	0	10	10
12	Mark Stewart	Great Britain	0	10	10
13	Moritz Malcharek	Germany	0	6	6
14	Viktor Filutás	Hungary	0	5	5
15	Vitaliy Hryniv	Ukraine	0	5	5
16	Christos Volikakis	Greece	0	3	3
17	Daniel Holloway	United States	0	3	3
18	Mark Downey	Ireland	0	2	2
19	Stefan Mastaller	Austria	0	1	1
20	Michael Foley	Canada	0	0	0
21	Roman Vassilenkov	Kazakhstan	0	0	0
22	Yacine Chalel	Algeria	−20	2	−18
–	Nicolas Pietrula	Czech Republic	Did not finish		
