= Stefan Mastaller =

Austrian cyclist

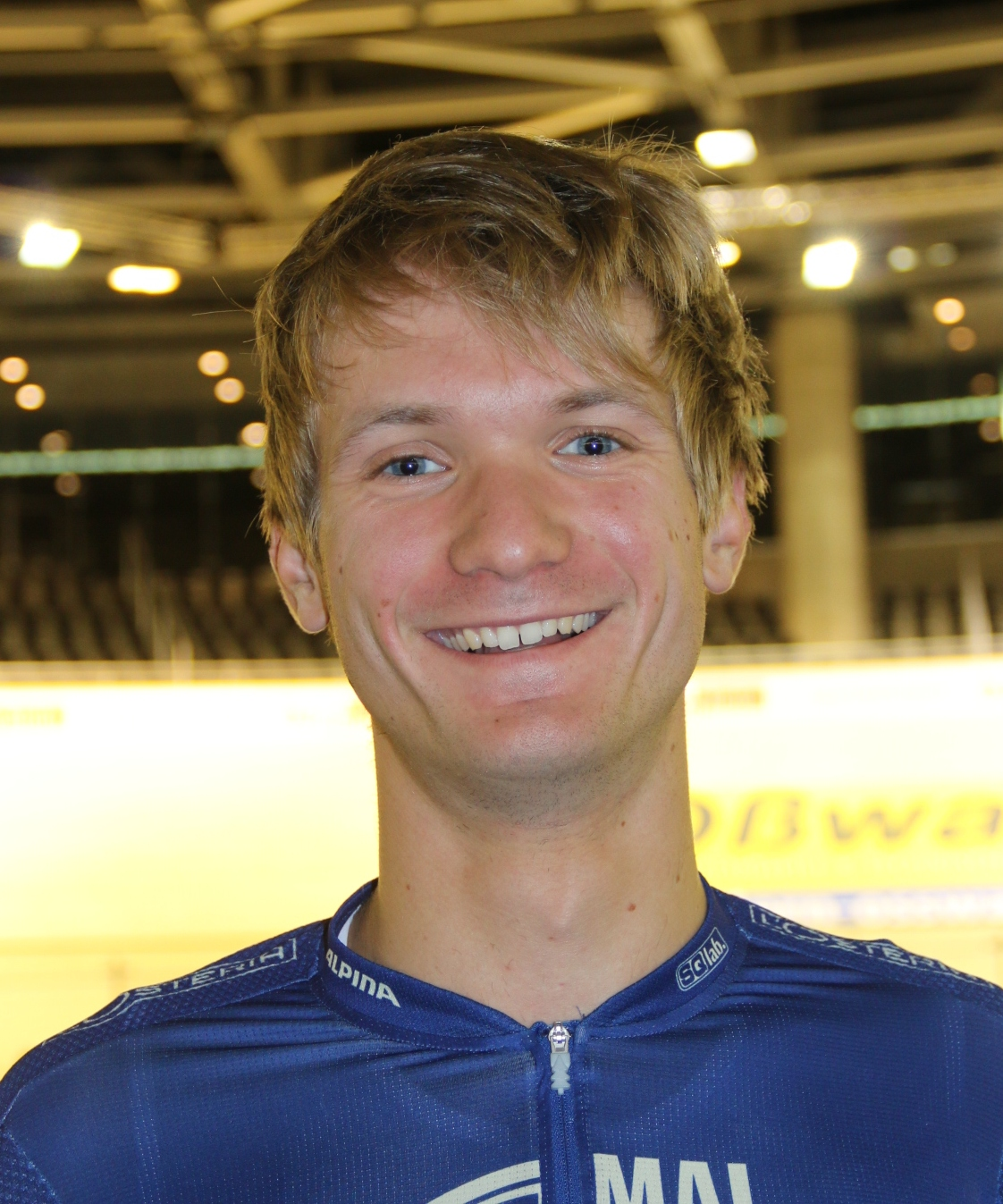
- Mastaller in 2017

Personal information
- Full name: Stefan Mastaller
- Born: 7 April 1995 (age 31) Vienna, Austria

Cycling career
- Sport: Cycling
- Current team: SPORT.LAND. Niederösterreich
- Disciplines: Road; Track
- Role: Rider

Professional team
- 2018–: My Bike–Stevens

Stefan Mastaller (born 7 April 1995) is an Austrian racing cyclist, who currently rides for UCI Continental team SPORT.LAND. Niederösterreich. He rode in the men's points race at the 2020 UCI Track Cycling World Championships.
