= Ivan Carbajal =

Mexican cyclist (born 1990)

Personal information
- Full name: Ivan de Jesus Carbajal Balbuena
- Born: 25 March 1990 (age 36) Oaxaca, Mexico

Cycling career
- Sport: Cycling
- Discipline: Track cycling
- Role: Rider
- Rider type: points race
Medal record
Men's track cycling
Representing Mexico
Pan American Championships
Silver medal – second place	2018 Aguascalientes	Scratch

Ivan de Jesus Carbajal Balbuena (born 25 March 1990) is a Mexican male track cyclist. He competed in the points race event at the 2014 UCI Track Cycling World Championships.
