= Roberto Serrano (cyclist) =

Mexican cyclist

Personal information
- Born: 19 June 1986 (age 40)

Cycling career
- Sport: Cycling
- Discipline: Track cycling
- Role: Rider

Roberto Serrano (born 19 June 1986) is a Mexican male track cyclist. He competed at the 2014 UCI Track Cycling World Championships.
