= Maria Averina =

Russian track cyclist

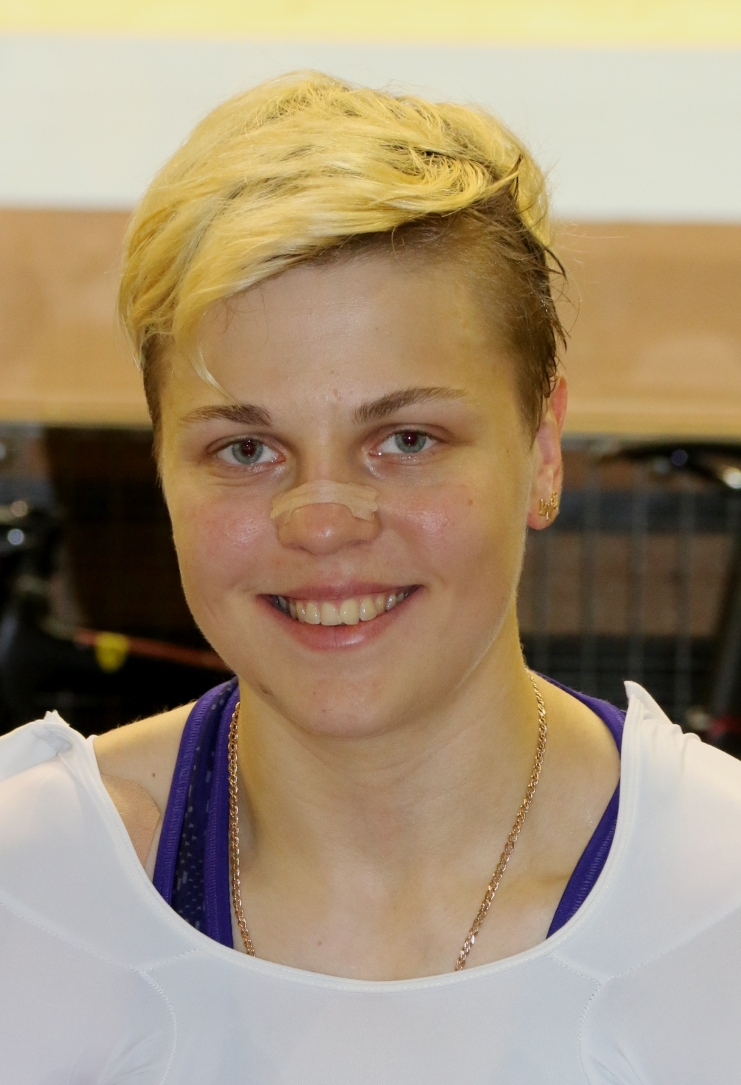
- Maria Averina (2017)

Personal information
- Born: 4 October 1993 (age 33)

Cycling career
- Sport: Cycling
- Discipline: Track cycling

Maria Averina (born 4 October 1993) is a Russian female track cyclist, representing Russia at international competitions. She won the bronze medal at the 2016–17 UCI Track Cycling World Cup, Round 1 in Glasgow in the madison.

== Career results ==
2015
Grand Prix of Tula

1st Points Race
1st Scratch Race

2nd Scratch Race, Grand Prix Minsk
2017
Grand Prix Minsk

1st Madison (with Galina Streltsova)
3rd Scratch Race

1st Madison, Grand Prix of Moscow (with Galina Streltsova)
Grand Prix of Tula

2nd Points Race
2nd Scratch Race
