= Giorgia Fraiegari =

Italian cyclist

Personal information
- Born: 18 July 1995 (age 31)

Cycling career
- Sport: Cycling
- Current team: Isolmant–Premac–Vittoria (road); TRED Factory Racing–Hardskin (track)
- Disciplines: Road; Track
- Role: Rider

Amateur teams
- 2018–2020: Born to Win
- 2020–: TRED Factory Racing–Hardskin (track)

Professional teams
- 2015–2016: BePink–La Classica
- 2017: Giusfredi–Bianchi
- 2021–: Isolmant–Premac–Vittoria (road)

Giorgia Fraiegari (born 18 July 1995) is an Italian professional racing cyclist, who currently rides for UCI Women's Continental Team Isolmant–Premac–Vittoria in road racing, and Italian team TRED Factory Racing–Hardskin in track cycling.
