= Nekane Gómez =

Spanish cyclist

Personal information
- Full name: Nekane Dolores Gómez Ramos
- Born: 2 September 1999 (age 27)

Cycling career
- Sport: Cycling
- Disciplines: Road and track
- Role: Rider

Professional team
- 2019: Massi–Tactic

Nekane Dolores Gómez Ramos (born 2 September 1999) is a Spanish professional racing cyclist, who last rode for the UCI Women's Team Massi–Tactic during the 2019 women's road cycling season.
