= Olivia Ray =

New Zealand cyclist

Personal information
- Full name: Olivia Ray
- Born: 4 July 1998 (age 28) Auckland, New Zealand
- Height: 1.60 m (5 ft 3 in)
- Weight: 45 kg (99 lb)

Cycling career
- Sport: Cycling
- Discipline: Track cycling
- Role: Rider

Professional team
- 2021–2022: Rally Cycling

Major wins
- One-day races and Classics National Road Race Championships (2022)

Olivia Ray (born 4 July 1998) is a New Zealand racing cyclist who raced professionally for Rally Cycling in 2021.

== Career ==
In 2022 Ray won the National road race championships in a reduced bunch sprint of six.

In 2021 Olivia won $15,000 in a criterium where she beat the current US criterium champion by 1 second to the line. By December she had not received her prize money.

She was removed from the Human Powered Health roster without explanation in March 2022.

Ray served a 30 month competition ban between March 2022 and September 2024 for an anti-doping rule violation after admitting to using prohibited substances including human growth hormane(hGH), clenbuterol, and oxandrolone.

== Major results ==
2021
1st Criterium, National Road Championships
1st Gravel and Tar La Femme
2022
1st Road race, National Road Championships
