= Fatima El Hayani =

Moroccan cyclist

Personal information
- Full name: Fatima Zahra El Hayani
- Born: 23 September 1996 (age 30)

Cycling career
- Sport: Cycling
- Discipline: Road
- Role: Rider

Professional teams
- 2020: Arkéa Pro Cycling Team
- 2021: WCC Team

Fatima Zahra El Hayani (born 23 September 1996) is a Moroccan professional racing cyclist, who last rode for UCI Women's Continental Team WCC Team. El Hayani became the national road race champion in 2018 and 2019 and also became the national time trial champion in 2018, winning the silver medal in 2019. She competes at the international women's races, including at the UCI Women's World Tour. She represented Morocco in the women's road race event at the 2020 UCI Road World Championships.

In 2020, El Hayani became the first Arab women to sign with a professional team when she agreed to a contract with the Arkéa Pro Cycling Team.
