= Jan Voneš =

Czech cyclist

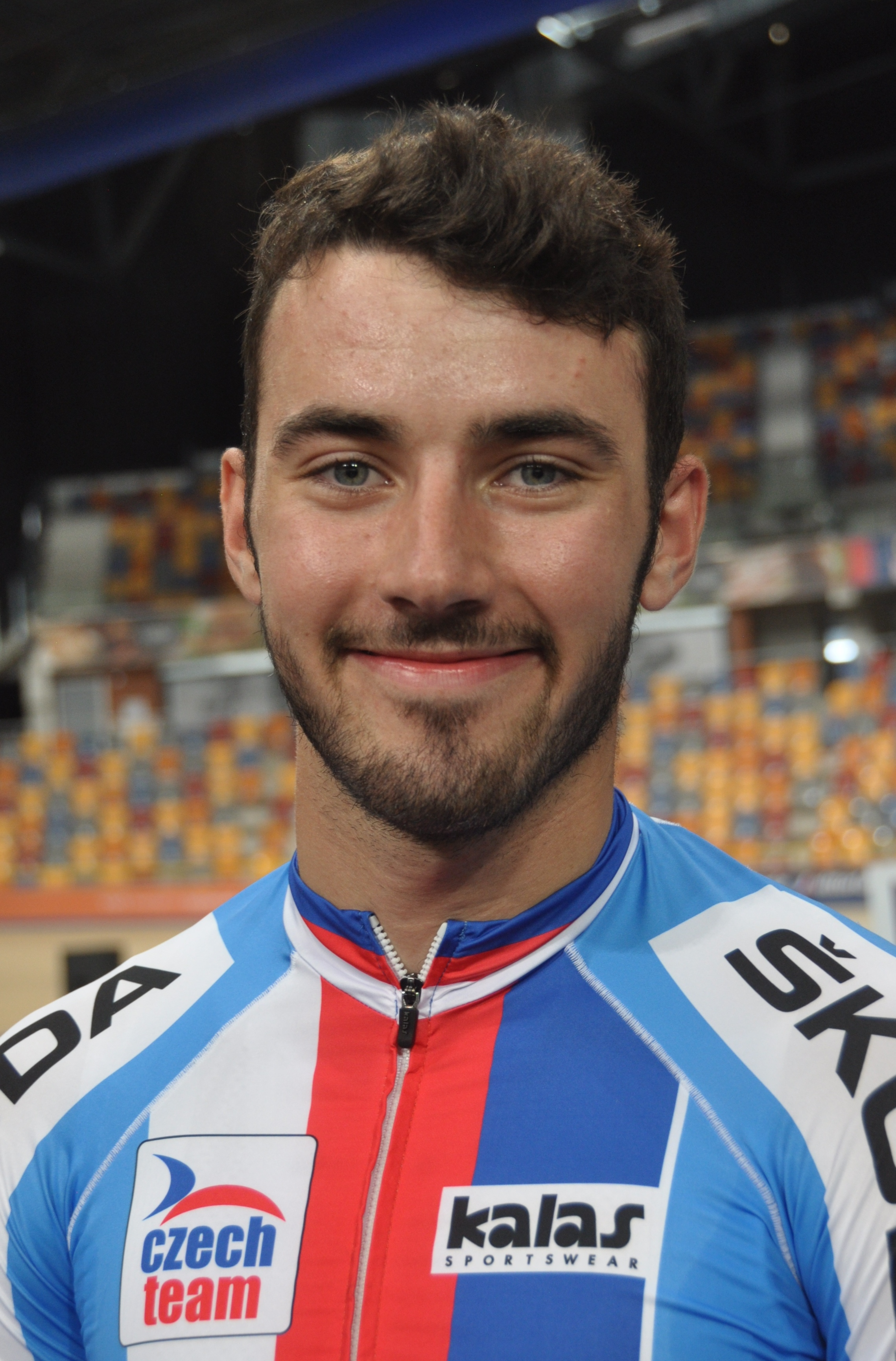
- Voneš in 2021

Personal information
- Born: 30 December 2000 (age 25) Třebíč, Czech Republic

Cycling career
- Sport: Cycling
- Current team: Tufo–Pardus Prostějov
- Disciplines: Road; Track
- Role: Rider

Amateur teams
- 2019: TJ Favorit Brno
- 2020–2022: Team Dukla Praha

Professional team
- 2023–: TUFO–Pardus Prostějov

Jan Voneš (born 30 December 2000) is a Czech road and track cyclist, who currently rides for UCI Continental team Tufo–Pardus Prostějov.

In 2021, Voneš made his debut at the UCI Track Cycling World Championships, finishing eleventh in the elimination race. He competed in the omnium at the 2024 Summer Olympics, placing 12th overall.

== Major results ==
=== Track ===
2021
National Championships

1st Madison (with Denis Rugovac)
1st Team pursuit

2022
National Championships

1st Scratch
1st Elimination race
1st Madison (with Denis Rugovac)
1st Team pursuit

2023
National Championships

1st Madison (with Denis Rugovac)
1st Team pursuit

=== Road ===
2020
4th Road race, National Under-23 Championships
