= Alisher Zhumakan =

Kazakhstani cyclist

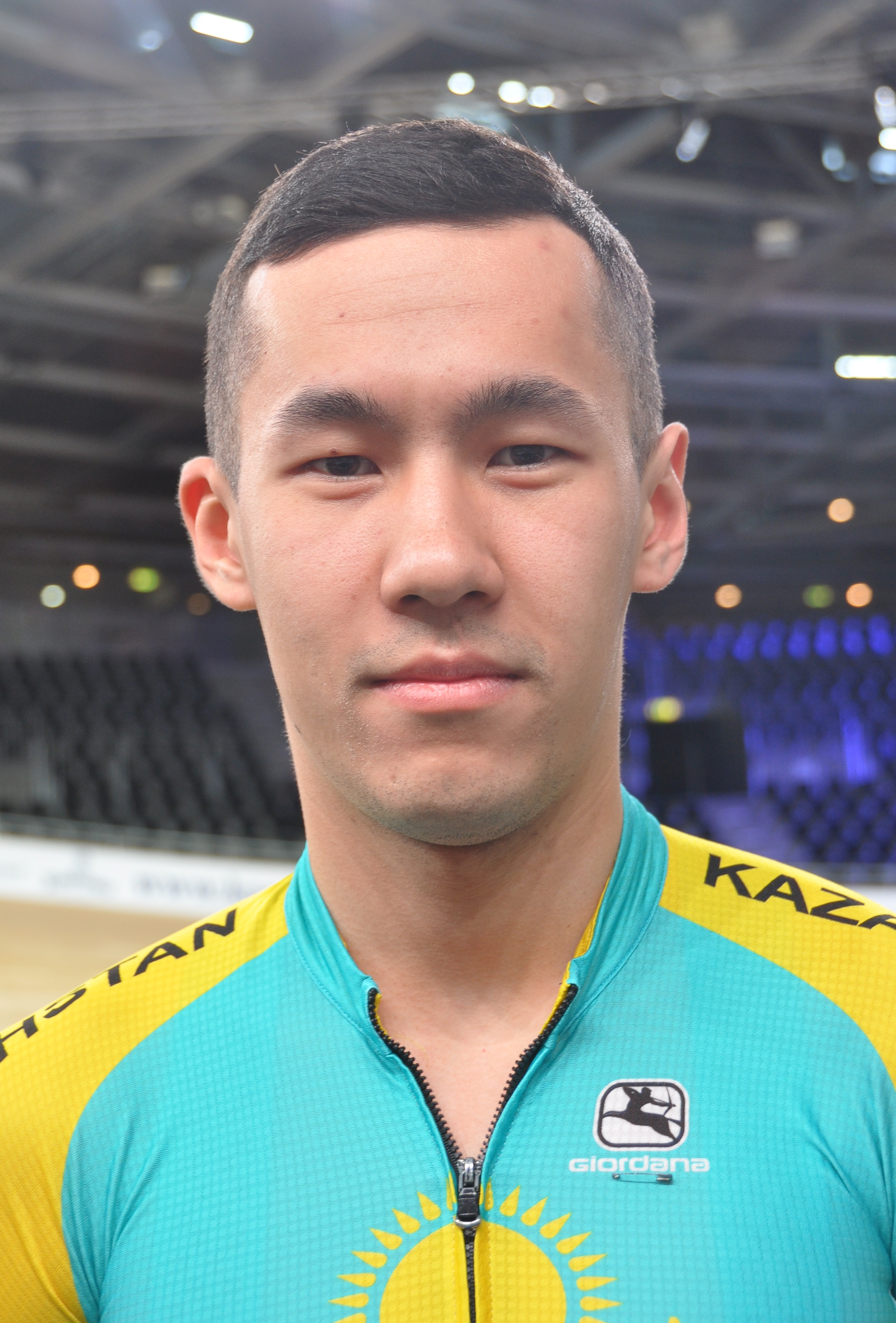
- Zhumakan at the 2020 UCI Track Cycling World Championships

Personal information
- Born: 17 January 1997 (age 29) Almaty, Kazakhstan

Cycling career
- Sport: Cycling
- Current team: Nursultan Cycling Team
- Disciplines: Road; Track
- Role: Rider

Amateur team
- 2021–: Nursultan Cycling Team

Professional teams
- 2016: Astana City
- 2017–2018: Track Team Astana
Medal record
Men's track cycling
Representing Kazakhstan
Asian Championships
Silver medal – second place	2019 Jakarta	Individual pursuit
Silver medal – second place	2020 Jincheon	Individual pursuit
Silver medal – second place	2020 Jincheon	Scratch
Silver medal – second place	2024 New Delhi	Points race
Silver medal – second place	2025 Nilai	Points race
Silver medal – second place	2026 Tagaytay	Points race
Silver medal – second place	2026 Tagaytay	Scratch
Bronze medal – third place	2019 Jakarta	Team pursuit
Bronze medal – third place	2022 New Delhi	Madison
Bronze medal – third place	2023 Nilai	Team pursuit
Bronze medal – third place	2024 New Delhi	Madison
Bronze medal – third place	2024 New Delhi	Team pursuit
Bronze medal – third place	2025 Nilai	Team pursuit
Islamic Solidarity Games
Gold medal – first place	2021 Konya	Individual pursuit
Bronze medal – third place	2021 Konya	Scratch

Alisher Zhumakan (Russian: Алишер Жумакан; born 17 January 1997) is a Kazakh track and road cyclist.

== Major results ==
2014
2nd Time trial, Asian Junior Road Championships
2015
1st Team pursuit, Asian Junior Track Championships
4th Time trial, Asian Junior Road Championships
2017
1st Team pursuit, Asian Indoor and Martial Arts Games
2nd Road race, National Road Championships
2019
1st Madison, National Track Championships (with Roman Vassilenkov)
Asian Track Championships

2nd Individual pursuit
3rd Team pursuit

2020
Asian Track Championships

2nd Individual pursuit
2nd Scratch

2023
9th Tour of Thailand
