= Marga López (cyclist) =

Spanish cyclist (born 1997)

Personal information
- Full name: Margarita López Llull
- Born: 3 December 1997 (age 28) Campos, Spain

Cycling career
- Sport: Cycling
- Discipline: Road
- Role: Rider

Amateur team
- 2020: Waasland Security–Wase Zon

Professional teams
- 2016: Bizkaia–Durango
- 2019: Health Mate–Cyclelive Team
- 2021: Lviv Cycling Team

Margarita López Llull (born 3 December 1997) is a Spanish professional racing cyclist, who rode for UCI Women's Continental Team Lviv Cycling Team. She has previously competed for UCI Women's Teams Bizkaia–Durango in 2016, and Health Mate–Cyclelive Team in 2019.
