= Yacine Chalel =

Algerian cyclist

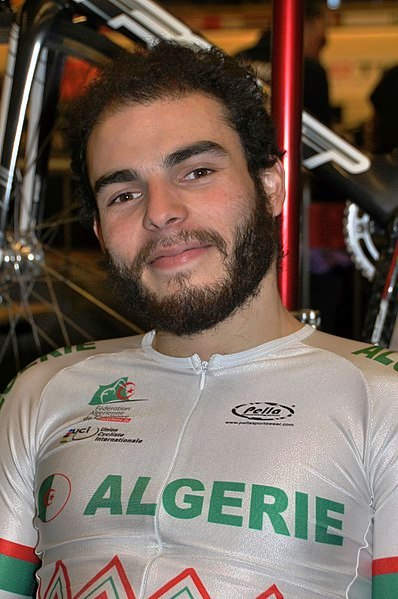
- Chalel in 2018

Personal information
- Born: 17 November 1995 (age 30) Paris, France

Cycling career
- Sport: Cycling
- Current team: Allcycles Val d'Europe
- Disciplines: Track; Road
- Role: Rider

Amateur teams
- 2008–2012: CSM Épinay-sur-Seine
- 2013–2018: OC Val d'Oise
- 2019–2020: Paris Cycliste Olympique
- 2021: Orléans Loiret Cyclisme
- 2022–: Allcycles Val d'Europe

Yacine Chalel (born 17 November 1995) is an Algerian racing cyclist. He rode in the men's points race and scratch at the 2020 UCI Track Cycling World Championships.

== Major results ==
2016
African Track Championships

2nd Points race
2nd Keirin

2017
Arab Track Championships

2nd Omnium
2nd Points race

2018
1st Scratch race, African Track Championships
2019
2nd Madison, Arab Track Championships
African Track Championships

3rd Points race
3rd Scratch race
3rd Omnium

2020
African Track Championships

2nd Points race
3rd Scratch race
3rd Omnium

2021
African Track Championships

2nd Scratch race
2nd Madison (with Lotfi Tchambaz)
2nd Team pursuit (with Lotfi Tchambaz, Youcef Reguigui and Yacine Hamza)
3rd Points race
3rd Elimination race

2022
African Track Championships

1st Madison (with Lotfi Tchambaz)
1st Points race
1st Team pursuit (with Lotfi Tchambaz, El Khacib Sassane and Hamza Megnouche)
2nd Omnium
