= Jan Kraus (cyclist) =

Czech cyclist (b. 1993)

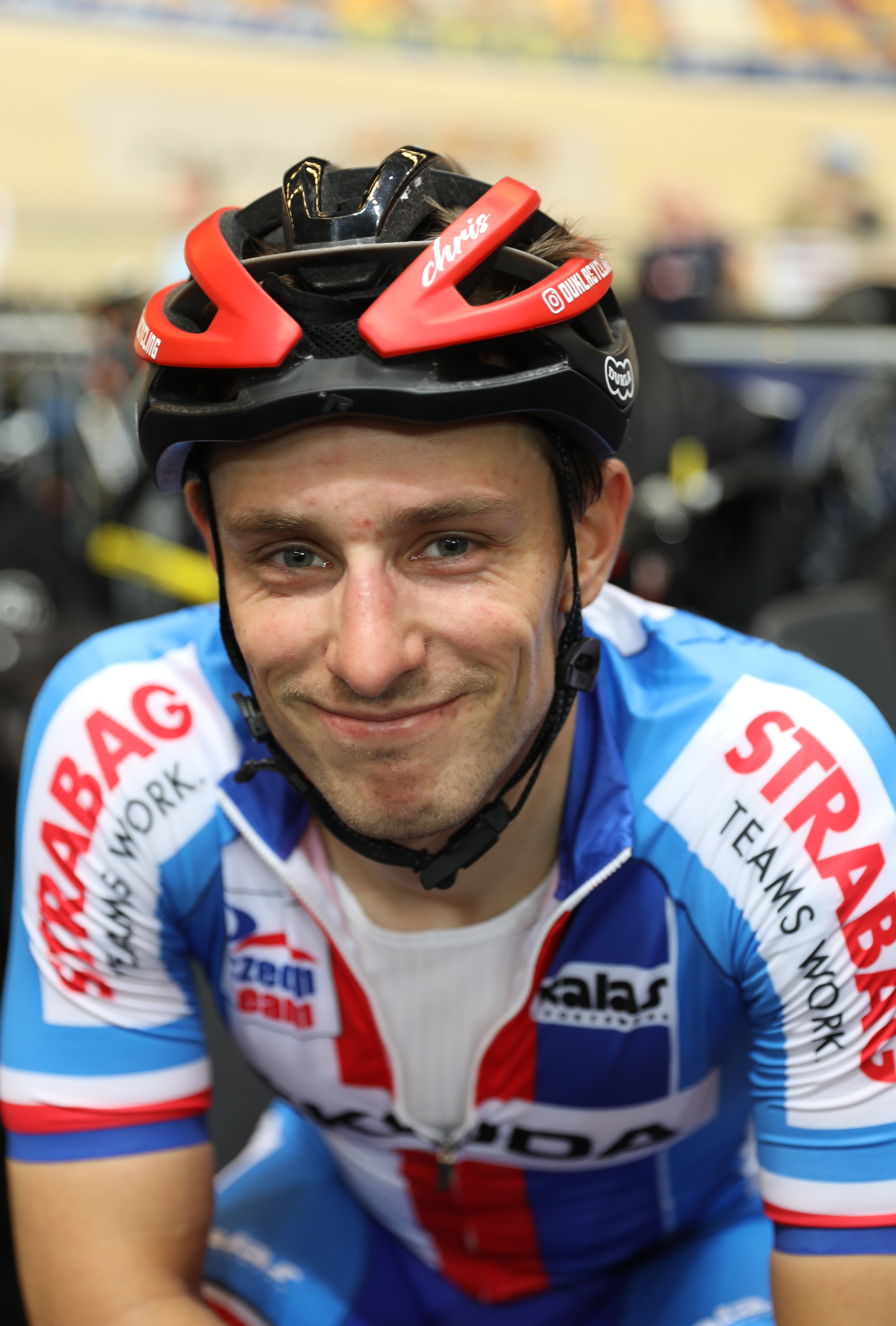
- Jan Kraus at the 2019 UEC European Track Championships

Personal information
- Born: 23 January 1993 (age 33)

Cycling career
- Sport: Cycling
- Discipline: Track cycling

Jan Kraus (born 23 January 1993) is a Czech male track cyclist, representing Czech Republic at international competitions. He competed at the 2016 UEC European Track Championships in the team pursuit event.
