= 2018 UEC European Track Championships (under-23 & junior) =

- Venue: Aigle
- Date: 21–26 August
- Velodrome: World Cycling Centre
- Nations participating: 25
- Cyclists participating: 343
- Events: 44

The 2018 UEC European Track Championships (under-23 & junior) is the 18th continental championships for European under-23 and junior track cyclists, and the 9th since the event was renamed following the reorganisation of European track cycling in 2010. The event took place at the World Cycling Centre in Aigle, Switzerland from 21 to 26 August 2018.

== Medal summary ==
=== Under-23 ===
Event	Gold		Silver		Bronze	
Men's events
Sprint	Rayan Helal; France		Melvin Landerneau; France		Martin Čechman; Czech Republic	
Team sprint	France; Melvin Landerneau; Rayan Helal; Florian Grengbo	35.746	Russia; Sergey Tabolin; Evgenii Bobrakov; Aleksandr Vasiukhno	36.213	Germany; Marc Jurczyk; Nik Schröter; Carl Hinze	36.298
1 km time trial	Aleksandr Vasiukhno; Russia	1:01.093	Marc Jurczyk; Germany	1:01.175	Ayrton De Pauw; Belgium	1:01.909
Keirin	Rayan Helal; France		Marc Jurczyk; Germany		Martin Čechman; Czech Republic	
Individual pursuit	Felix Groß; Germany	4:16.622	Ivan Smirnov; Russia	4:17.080	Stefan Bissegger; Switzerland	4:16.552
Team pursuit	Great Britain; Matthew Bostock; Joe Holt; Matthew Walls; Fred Wright; Rhys Britton	3:57.336	Switzerland; Valère Thiébaud; Lukas Rüegg; Stefan Bissegger; Robin Froidevaux; Nico Selenati	DNF	Russia; Ivan Smirnov; Dmitrii Mukhomediarov; Lev Gonov; Gleb Syritsa	caught opponent
Points race	Edgar Stepanyan; Armenia	98 Points	Matteo Donega; Italy	92 Points	Bryan Boussaer; Belgium	89 Points
Scratch	Matthew Walls; Great Britain		Nico Selenati; Switzerland		Marten Kooistra; Netherlands	
Madison	Great Britain; Matthew Walls; Ethan Hayter	121 Points	Belgium; Bryan Boussaer; Jules Hesters	51 Points	Switzerland; Nico Selenati; Lukas Ruegg	38 Points
Omnium	Ethan Hayter; Great Britain	175 Points	Moritz Malcharek; Germany	124 Points	Sergey Rostovtsev; Russia	102 Points
Elimination race	Jules Hesters; Belgium		Aleksandr Smirnov; Russia		Yauheni Karaliok; Belarus	
Women's events
Sprint	Miriam Vece; Italy		Miglė Marozaitė; Lithuania		Nicky Degrendele; Belgium	
Team sprint	Poland; Julita Jagodzińska; Marlena Karwacka	27.894	Italy; Miriam Vece; Martina Fidanza; Gloria Manzoni	28.789	Great Britain; Milly Tanner; Georgia Hilleard	only 3 participated
500 m time trial	Miriam Vece; Italy	34.073	Miglė Marozaitė; Lithuania	34.290	Milly Tanner; Great Britain	35.119
Keirin	Nicky Degrendele; Belgium		Steffie van der Peet; Netherlands		Aleksandra Tolomanow; Poland	
Individual pursuit	Marta Cavalli; Italy	3:32.303	Martina Alzini; Italy	3:39.993	Natalia Studenikina; Russia	3:34.446
Team pursuit	Italy; Martina Alzini; Elisa Balsamo; Marta Cavalli; Letizia Paternoster; Vittoria Guazzini		Great Britain; Megan Barker; Rebecca Raybould; Jessica Roberts; Jenny Holl; Abigail Dentus	OVR	Germany; Laura Sussemilch; Michaela Ebert; Franziska Brauße; Lea Lin Teutenberg	4:32.429
Points race	Diana Klimova; Russia	79 Points	Aksana Salauyeva; Belarus	75 Points	Valentine Fortin; France	75 Points
Scratch	Kirstie van Haaften; Netherlands		Rebecca Raybould; Great Britain		Maria Martins; Portugal	
Madison	Russia; Maria Novolodskaya; Diana Klimova	85 Points	Great Britain; Megan Barker; Jessica Roberts	38 Points	Italy; Elisa Balsamo; Letizia Paternoster	34 Points
Omnium	Letizia Paternoster; Italy	136 Points	Franziska Brauße; Germany	132 Points	Megan Barker; Great Britain	129 Points
Elimination race	Letizia Paternoster; Italy		Clara Copponi; France		Mylène de Zoete; Netherlands	

=== Junior ===
Event	Gold		Silver		Bronze	
Men's events
Sprint	Ivan Gladyshev; Russia		Florian Grengbo; France		Jakub Šťastný; Czech Republic	
Team sprint	Russia; Danila Burlakov; Daniil Komkov; Ivan Gladyshev; Mikhail Smagin	36.557	France; Jordy Thicot; Titouan Renvoisé; Vincent Yon	37.334	Poland; Cezary Łączkowski; Oskar Filipczak; Mateusz Sztrauch; Bartosz Kucharski	37.122
1 km time trial	Jakub Šťastný; Czech Republic	1:02.837	Titouan Renvoisé; France	1:02.954	Filip Prokopyszyn; Poland	1:03.597
Keirin	Florian Grengbo; France		Cezary Łączkowski; Poland		Jakub Šťastný; Czech Republic	
Individual pursuit	Samuele Manfredi; Italy	3:15.944	Panagiotis Karatsivis; Greece	3:17.152	Nikita Bersenev; Russia	3:16.990
Team pursuit	Poland; Kacper Walkowiak; Damian Papierski; Wiktor Richter; Michał Gałka	4:03.656	Italy; Samuele Manfredi; Alessio Bonelli; Davide Boscaro; Tommaso Nencini; Diego Bosini	4:04.668	Germany; Max Gehrmann; Calvin Dik; Jannis Peter; Tobias Buck-Gramcko	4:07.401
Points race	Yanne Dorenbos; Netherlands	65 Points	Panagiotis Karatsivis; Greece	51 Points	Dzianis Mazur; Belarus	47 Points
Scratch	Arthur Senrame; Belgium		Filip Prokopyszyn; Poland		Panagiotis Karatsivis; Greece	
Madison	Belgium; Nicolas Wernimont; Fabio Van den Bossche	43 Points	Germany; Calvin Dik; Nils Weispfennig	34 Points	Poland; Damian Papierski; Filip Prokopyszyn	25 Points
Omnium	Fabio Van den Bossche; Belgium	132 Points	Calvin Dik; Germany	129 Points	Tommaso Nencini; Italy	125 Points
Elimination race	Milan Fretin; Belgium		Dzianis Mazur; Belarus		Louis Brulé; France	
Women's events
Sprint	Yana Tyshenko; Russia		Kseniia Andreeva; Russia		Nikola Sibiak; Poland	
Team sprint	Russia; Kseniia Andreeva; Yana Tyshenko; Anna Dozhdeva	28.418	Lithuania; Viktorija Sumskyte; Arūnė Savičiūtė	28.498	Poland; Paulina Petri; Nikola Sibiak	only 3 participated
500 m time trial	Yana Tyshenko; Russia	34.632	Viktorija Sumskyte; Lithuania	35.106	Kseniia Andreeva; Russia	35.457
Keirin	Yana Tyshenko; Russia		Giada Capobianchi; Italy		Anna Dozhdeva; Russia	
Individual pursuit	Vittoria Guazzini; Italy	2:21.197	Lara Gillespie; Ireland	2:21.846	Sofia Collinelli; Italy	2:24.013
Team pursuit	Italy; Silvia Zanardi; Gloria Scarsi; Giorgia Catarzi; Sofia Collinelli; Camilla Alessio	4:30.397	Russia; Karine Minasian; Daria Malkova; Mariia Miliaeva; Aigul Gareeva	4:33.208	Germany; Ricarda Bauernfeind; Lena Reissner; Friederike Stern; Finja Smekal	4:40.329
Points race	Lara Gillespie; Ireland	30 Points	Olha Kulynych; Ukraine	25 Points	Marta Jaskulska; Poland	24 Points
Scratch	Gloria Scarsi; Italy		Shari Bossuyt; Belgium		Anastasia Lukashenko; Russia	
Madison	Italy; Gloria Scarsi; Vittoria Guazzini		Russia; Daria Malkova; Mariia Miliaeva		Germany; Katharina Hechler; Ricarda Bauernfeind	
Omnium	Vittoria Guazzini; Italy	138 Points	Shari Bossuyt; Belgium	127 Points	Marta Jaskulska; Poland	122 Points
Elimination race	Gloria Scarsi; Italy		Shari Bossuyt; Belgium		Marta Jaskulska; Poland	

=== Notes ===
- Competitors named in italics only participated in rounds prior to the final.

== Medal table ==
Rank	Nation	Gold	Silver	Bronze	Total
1	Italy (ITA)	13	5	3	21
2	Russia (RUS)	9	6	7	22
3	Belgium (BEL)	6	4	3	13
4	France (FRA)	4	5	2	11
5	Great Britain (GBR)	4	3	3	10
6	Poland (POL)	2	2	9	13
7	Netherlands (NED)	2	1	2	5
8	Germany (GER)	1	6	5	12
9	Ireland (IRL)	1	1	0	2
10	Czech Republic (CZE)	1	0	4	5
11	Armenia (ARM)	1	0	0	1
12	Lithuania (LTU)	0	4	0	4
13	Belarus (BLR)	0	2	2	4
13	Switzerland (SUI)	0	2	2	4
15	Greece (GRE)	0	2	1	3
16	Ukraine (UKR)	0	1	0	1
17	Portugal (POR)	0	0	1	1
Totals (17 entries)		44	44	44	132
