= 2022 Intermarché–Wanty–Gobert Matériaux season =

Intermarché–Wanty–Gobert Matériaux
- 2022 season
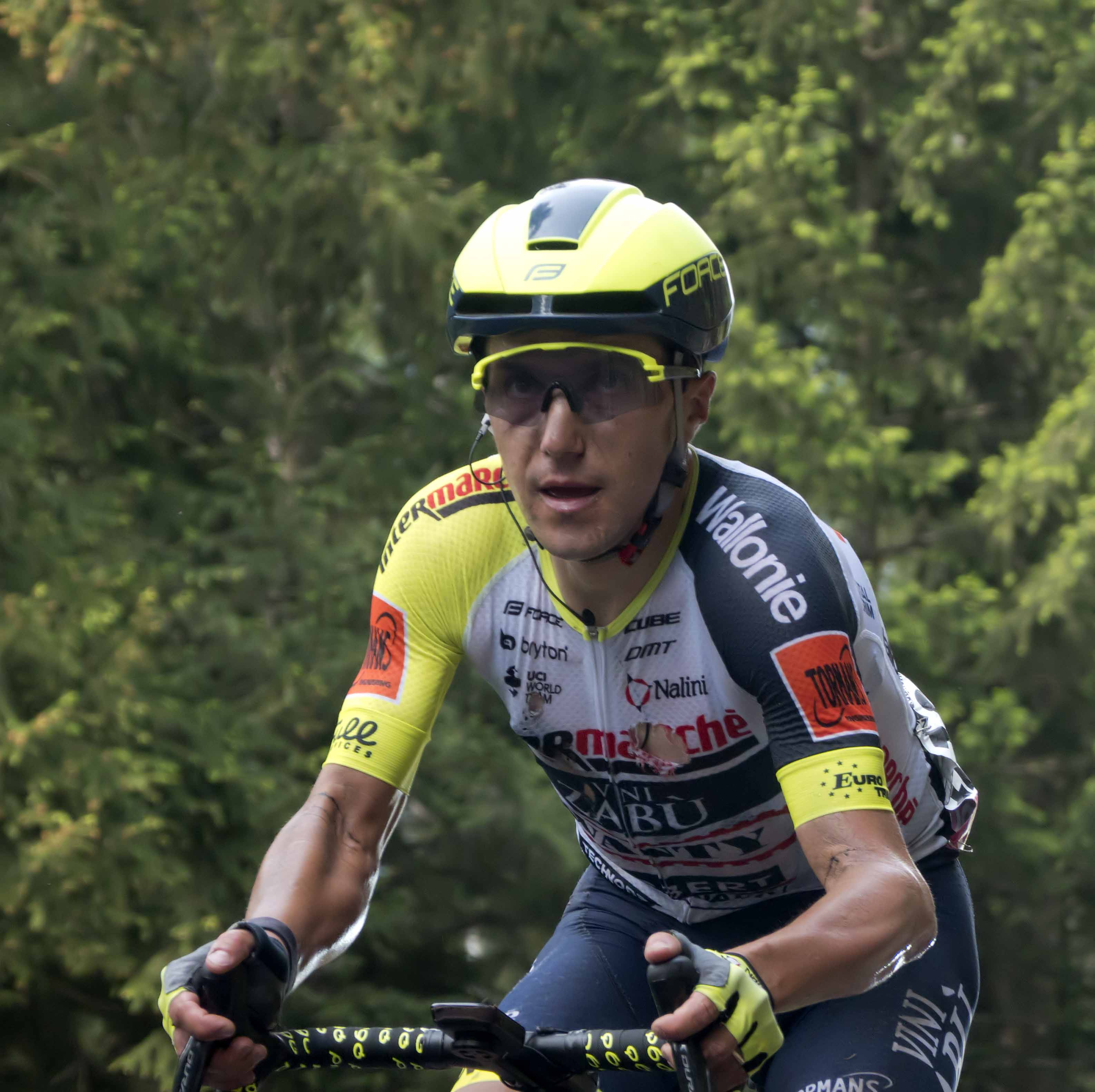
- Domenico Pozzovivo on Stage 16 Giro d'Italia
- UCI code: IWG
- Status: UCI WorldTeam
- Manager: Jean-François Bourlart (BEL)
- Main sponsor(s): Groupe Gobert; Intermarché; Wanty
- Based: Belgium
- Bicycles: Cube
- Groupset: Shimano

Season victories
- One-day races: 5
- Stage race overall: 1
- Stage race stages: 5
- Jersey

The 2022 season for Intermarché–Wanty–Gobert Matériaux is the 15th season in the team's existence, and its second as a UCI WorldTeam and under the current name. They use Cube bicycles, Shimano drivetrain, Newmen wheels and Santic clothing.

== Team roster ==
As of 15 February 2022.

Rider	Date of birth
Jan Bakelants (BEL)	14 February 1986 (aged 35)
Sven Erik Bystrøm (NOR)	21 January 1992 (aged 29)
Dimitri Claeys (BEL)	18 June 1987 (aged 34)
Aimé De Gendt (BEL)	17 June 1994 (aged 27)
Théo Delacroix (FRA)	21 February 1999 (aged 22)
Tom Devriendt (BEL)	29 October 1991 (aged 30)
Biniam Girmay (ERI)	2 April 2000 (aged 21)
Kobe Goossens (BEL)	29 April 1996 (aged 25)
Quinten Hermans (BEL)	29 July 1995 (aged 26)
Jan Hirt (CZE)	21 January 1991 (aged 30)
Laurens Huys (BEL)	24 September 1998 (aged 23)
Julius Johansen (DEN)	13 September 1999 (aged 22)
Alexander Kristoff (NOR)	5 July 1987 (aged 34)
Louis Meintjes (RSA)	21 February 1992 (aged 29)
Hugo Page (FRA)	24 July 2001 (aged 20)

Rider	Date of birth
Andrea Pasqualon (ITA)	2 January 1988 (aged 33)
Barnabás Peák (HUN)	29 November 1998 (aged 23)
Simone Petilli (ITA)	4 May 1993 (aged 28)
Adrien Petit (FRA)	26 September 1990 (aged 31)
Baptiste Planckaert (BEL)	28 September 1988 (aged 33)
Domenico Pozzovivo (Note: Pozzovivo joined the team in mid-February after not having a contract since the end of the 2021 season, when Team Qhubeka NextHash stopped WorldTour operations.) (ITA)	30 November 1982 (aged 39)
Lorenzo Rota (ITA)	23 May 1995 (aged 26)
Rein Taaramäe (EST)	24 April 1987 (aged 34)
Gerben Thijssen (BEL)	21 June 1998 (aged 23)
Taco van der Hoorn (NED)	4 December 1993 (aged 28)
Corné van Kessel (NED)	7 August 1991 (aged 30)
Kevin Van Melsen (BEL)	1 April 1987 (aged 34)
Boy van Poppel (NED)	18 January 1988 (aged 33)
Loïc Vliegen (BEL)	20 December 1993 (aged 28)
Georg Zimmermann (GER)	11 October 1997 (aged 24)

Riders who joined the team for or during the 2022 season

Rider	2021 team
Sven Erik Bystrøm	UAE Team Emirates
Dimitri Claeys	Team Qhubeka NextHash
Kobe Goossens	Lotto–Soudal
Laurens Huys	Bingoal Pauwels Sauces WB
Julius Johansen	Uno-X Pro Cycling Team
Alexander Kristoff	UAE Team Emirates
Hugo Page	neo-pro (Groupama–FDJ Continental Team)
Barnabás Peák	Team BikeExchange
Adrien Petit	Team TotalEnergies
Domenico Pozzovivo	Team Qhubeka NextHash
Gerben Thijssen	Lotto–Soudal

Riders who left the team during or after the 2021 season

Rider	2022 team
Jérémy Bellicaud	Océane Top16
Jasper De Plus	Retired
Ludwig De Winter	Retired
Odd Christian Eiking	EF Education–EasyPost
Alex Evans	
Jonas Koch	Bora–Hansgrohe
Wesley Kreder	Cofidis
Maurits Lammertink	
Riccardo Minali	
Danny van Poppel	Bora–Hansgrohe
Pieter Vanspeybrouck	Retired

== Season victories ==
Date	Race	Competition	Rider	Country	Location	Ref.
27 January	Trofeo Alcúdia – Port d'Alcúdia	UCI Europe Tour	Biniam Girmay (ERI)	Spain	Port d'Alcúdia	
13 February	Clásica de Almería	UCI ProSeries	Alexander Kristoff (NOR)	Spain	Roquetas de Mar	
14 February	Tour of Oman, Stage 5	UCI ProSeries	Jan Hirt (CZE)	Oman	Jabal al Akhdhar (Green Mountain)	
15 February	Tour of Oman, Overall	UCI ProSeries	Jan Hirt (CZE)	Oman		
27 March	Gent–Wevelgem	UCI World Tour	Biniam Girmay (ERI)	Belgium	Wevelgem	
6 April	Scheldeprijs	UCI ProSeries	Alexander Kristoff (NOR)	Belgium	Schoten	
8 May	Four Days of Dunkirk, Stage 6	UCI ProSeries	Gerben Thijssen (BEL)	France	Dunkirk	
17 May	Giro d'Italia, Stage 10	UCI World Tour	Biniam Girmay (ERI)	Italy	Iesi	
24 May	Giro d'Italia, Stage 16	UCI World Tour	Jan Hirt (CZE)	Italy	Aprica	
26 May	Circuit de Wallonie	UCI Europe Tour	Andrea Pasqualon (ITA)	Belgium	Mont-sur-Marchienne	
29 May	Tour of Norway, Stage 6	UCI ProSeries	Alexander Kristoff (NOR)	Norway	Stavanger	
2 June	Giro dell'Appennino	UCI Europe Tour	Louis Meintjes (RSA)	Italy	Genoa	

== National, Continental, and World Champions ==
Date	Discipline	Jersey	Rider	Country	Location	Ref.
