= Reto Müller =

Reto Müller may refer to:

- Reto Müller (musicologist)
- Reto Müller (cyclist)
