= 2018 UCI Junior Track Cycling World Championships =

- Venue: Aigle, Switzerland
- Date: 15–19 August 2018
- Velodrome: World Cycling Centre

The 2018 UCI Junior Track Cycling World Championships were the 44th annual Junior World Championships for track cycling, held at the World Cycling Centre in Aigle, Switzerland from 15 to 19 August.

The Championships had ten events each for men and women (sprint, points race, individual pursuit, team pursuit, time trial, team sprint, keirin, madison, scratch race, omnium).

== Medal summary ==
Event	Gold	Silver	Bronze
Men's Events
Sprint	Cezary Łączkowski; Poland	Thomas Cornish; Australia	Jakub Šťastný; Czech Republic
Points race	Lucas Plapp; Australia	Filip Prokopyszyn; Poland	Robin Juel Skivild; Denmark
Individual pursuit	Lev Gonov; Russia	Ethan Vernon; United Kingdom	Gleb Syritsa; Russia
Team pursuit	Corbin Strong; George Jackson; Finn Fisher-Black; Bailey O'Donnell; New Zealand	Donavan Grondin; Nicolas Hamon; Florian Pardon; Kévin Vauquelin; Louis Brule; France	Blake Quick; Lucas Plapp; Matthew Rice; Luke Wight; Australia
Time trial	Thomas Cornish; Australia	Jakub Šťastný; Czech Republic	Anton Höhne; Germany
Team sprint	Florian Grengbo; Vincent Yon; Titouan Renvoisé; France	Oskar Filipczak; Bartosz Kucharski; Cezary Łączkowski; Poland	Daniil Komkov; Ivan Gladyshev; Danila Burlakov; Mikhail Smagin; Russia
Keirin	Jakub Šťastný; Czech Republic	Esow Esow; India	Andrey Chugay; Kazakhstan
Madison	Blake Quick; Lucas Plapp; Australia	Gleb Syritsa; Lev Gonov; Russia	Oliver Wulff Frederiksen; Matias Gunnar Malmberg; Denmark
Scratch race	Park Joo-young; South Korea	Filip Prokopyszyn; Poland	Samuel Thibaud; France
Omnium	Donavan Grondin; France	Frederik Wandahl; Denmark	Blake Quick; Australia

Event	Gold	Silver	Bronze
Women's Events
Sprint	Lea Friedrich; Germany	Hu Jiafang; China	Nikola Sibiak; Poland
Individual pursuit	Vittoria Guazzini; Italy	Daria Malkova; Russia	Sophie Edwards; Australia
Time trial	Lea Friedrich; Germany	Iana Tyshenko; Russia	Alessa Pröpster; Germany
Points race	Silvia Zanardi; Italy	Sarah Gigante; Australia	Shari Bossuyt; Belgium
Keirin	Lea Friedrich; Germany	Nikola Sibiak; Poland	Iana Tyshenko; Russia
Scratch race	Shin Ji-eun; South Korea	Marta Jaskulska; Poland	Katharina Hechler; Germany
Team sprint	Lea Friedrich; Alessa Pröpster; Emma Götz; Germany	Lei Min; Hu Jiafang; China	Nikola Seremak; Nikola Sibiak; Poland
Team pursuit	Giorgia Catarzi; Sofia Collinelli; Silvia Zanardi; Vittoria Guazzini; Gloria Scarsi; Italy	Alexandra Martin-Wallace; Alice Culling; Sophie Edwards; Lauren Robards; Australia	Ally Wollaston; Sami Donnelly; Annamarie Lipp; McKenzie Milne; New Zealand
Omnium	Vittoria Guazzini; Italy	Daria Malkova; Russia	Marta Jaskulska; Poland
Madison	Victoire Berteau; Marie Le Net; France	Daria Malkova; Mariia Miliaeva; Russia	Alexandra Martin-Wallace; Alice Culling; Australia

== Medal table ==
* Host nation (Switzerland)

Rank	Nation	Gold	Silver	Bronze	Total
1	Germany (GER)	4	0	3	7
2	Italy (ITA)	4	0	0	4
3	Australia (AUS)	3	3	4	10
4	France (FRA)	3	1	1	5
5	South Korea (KOR)	2	0	0	2
6	Poland (POL)	1	5	3	9
6	Russia (RUS)	1	5	3	9
8	Czech Republic (CZE)	1	1	1	3
9	New Zealand (NZL)	1	0	1	2
10	China (CHN)	0	2	0	2
11	Denmark (DNK)	0	1	2	3
12	Great Britain (GBR)	0	1	0	1
12	India (IND)	0	1	0	1
14	Belgium (BEL)	0	0	1	1
14	Kazakhstan (KAZ)	0	0	1	1
Totals (15 entries)		20	20	20	60
