= Nico Selenati =

Swiss cyclist (born 1996)

Personal information
- Full name: Nico Selenati
- Born: 30 July 1996 (age 30) Uster, Switzerland

Cycling career
- Sport: Cycling
- Current team: Akros–Excelsior–Thömus
- Disciplines: Track; Road
- Role: Rider

Amateur teams
- 2015: Gadola–Wetzikon
- 2016: EKZ Racing
- 2017: MG Project

Professional team
- 2018–: Akros–Renfer SA
Medal record
Representing Switzerland
Men's track cycling
European Games
Bronze medal – third place	2019 Minsk	Team pursuit

Nico Selenati (born 30 July 1996) is a Swiss cyclist, who currently rides for UCI Continental team Akros–Excelsior–Thömus.

== Major results ==
=== Track ===
2013
3rd Team pursuit, UEC European Junior Track Championships
2014
1st Team sprint, National Track Championships (with Jan Keller and Reto Müller)
UEC European Junior Track Championships

2nd Madison
3rd Team pursuit

2016
National Track Championships

1st Team sprint (with Andreas Müller and Reto Müller)
2nd Elimination race

3rd Scratch, UEC European Under-23 Track Championships
2017
1st Team pursuit, National Track Championships (with Claudio Imhof, Patrick Müller, Lukas Rüegg and Reto Müller)
2018
UEC European Under-23 Track Championships

2nd Team pursuit
2nd Scratch
3rd Madison

2nd Points race, National Track Championships

=== Road ===
2018
5th International Rhodes Grand Prix
