= Jakub Šťastný =

Czech cyclist

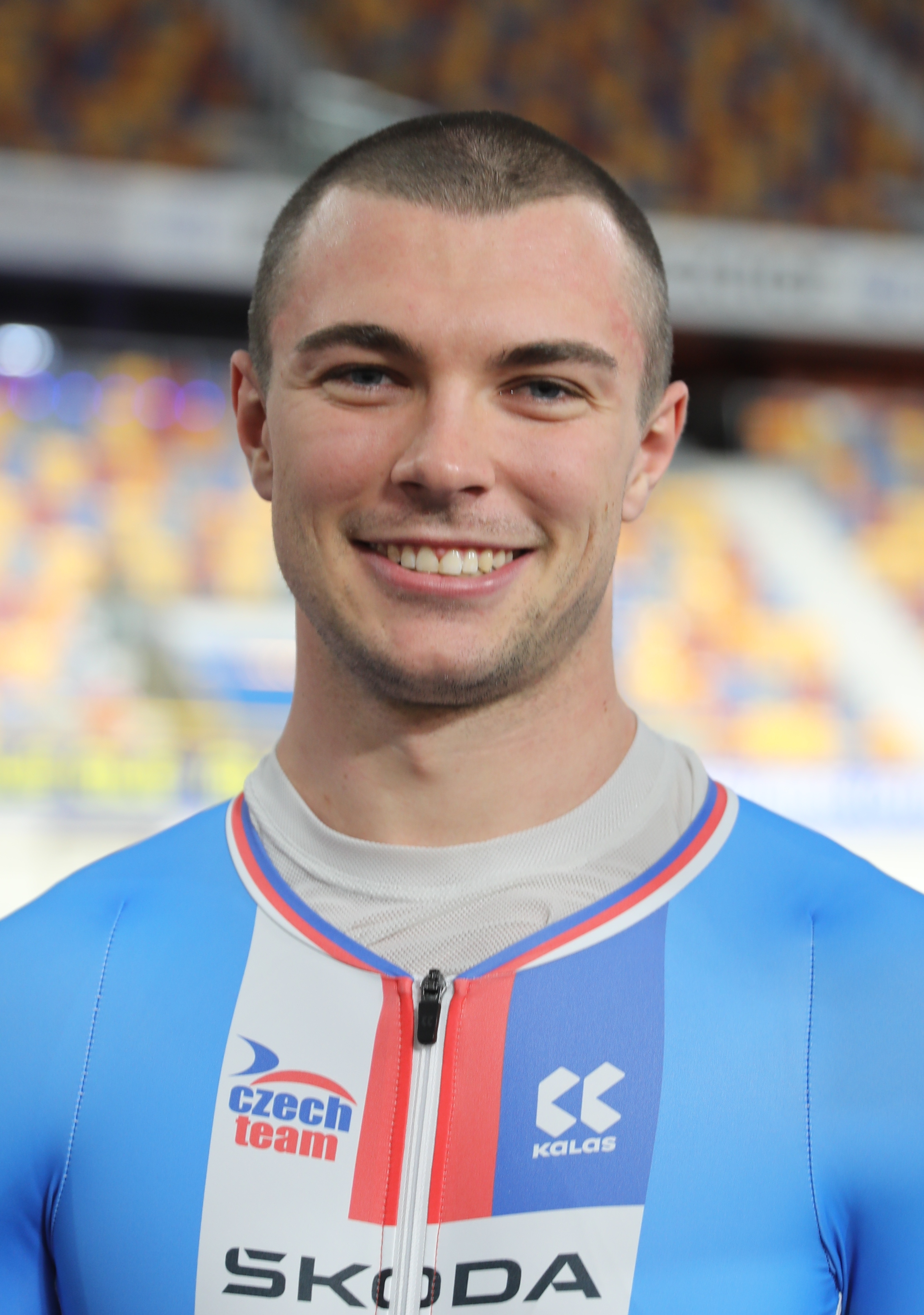
- Šťastný in 2024

Personal information
- Born: 28 August 2000 (age 26)

Cycling career
- Sport: Cycling
- Discipline: Track
- Role: Rider
- Rider type: Sprinter
Medal record
Men's track cycling
Representing Czech Republic
European Championships
Silver medal – second place	2020 Plovdiv	Team sprint
UCI Junior World Championships
Gold medal – first place	2018 Aigle	Keirin
Silver medal – second place	2018 Aigle	Kilometer
Bronze medal – third place	2018 Aigle	Sprint
European U23 & Junior Championships
Gold medal – first place	2018 Aigle	Junior Kilometer
Silver medal – second place	2020 Fiorenzuola	U23 Team pursuit
Bronze medal – third place	2017 Anadia	Junior Kilometer
Bronze medal – third place	2018 Aigle	Junior Keirin
Bronze medal – third place	2018 Aigle	Junior Sprint

Jakub Šťastný (born 28 August 2000) is a Czech track cyclist, who competes in sprinting events.
