= Jannis Peter =

German cyclist

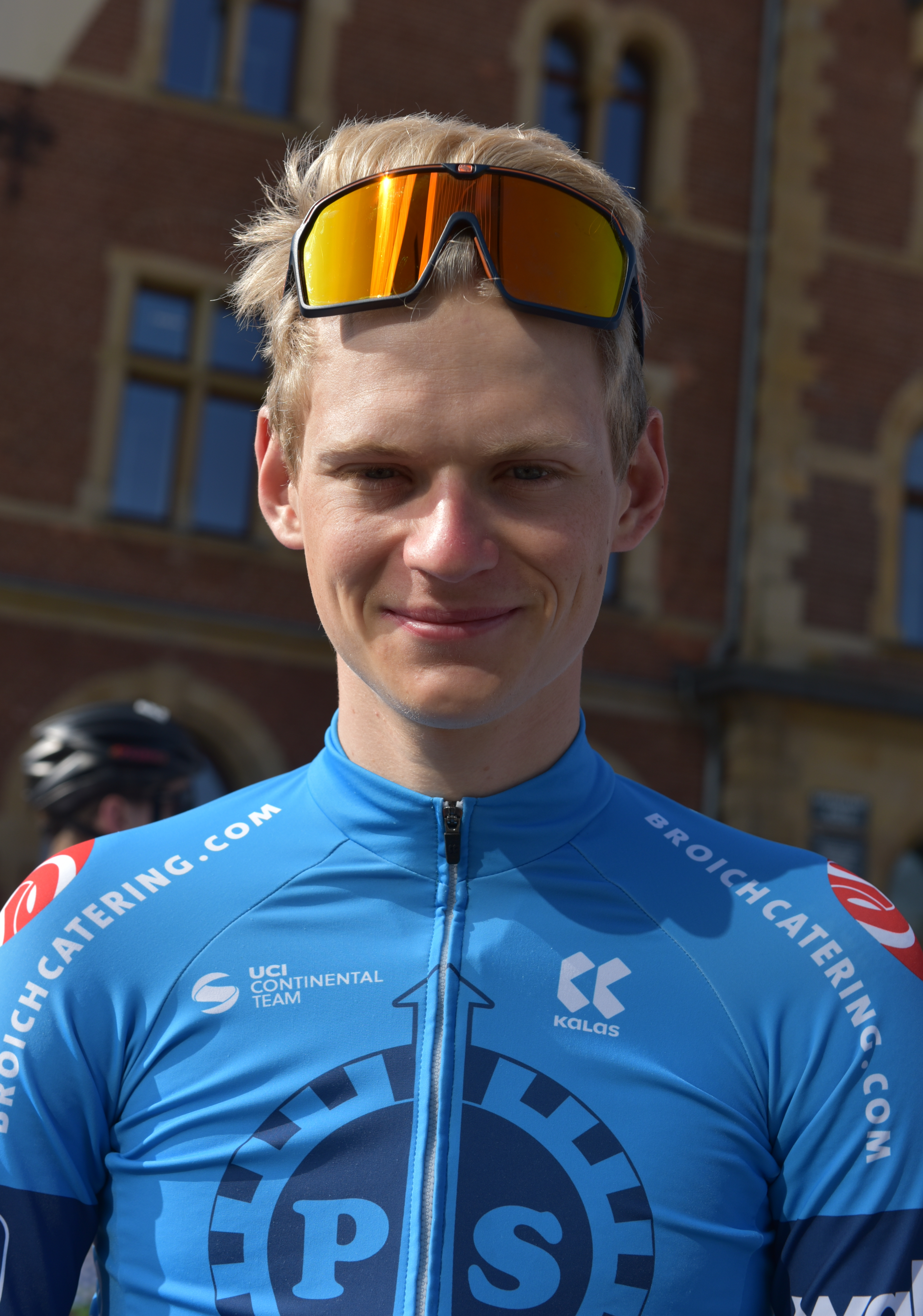
- Peter in 2022

Personal information
- Born: 30 October 2000 (age 25) Gera, Germany
- Height: 1.83 m (6 ft 0 in)
- Weight: 65 kg (143 lb)

Cycling career
- Sport: Cycling
- Current team: Unibet Rose Rockets
- Discipline: Road
- Role: Rider
- Rider type: Climber

Professional teams
- 2019–2021: Heizomat–rad-net.de
- 2022–2023: P&S Benotti
- 2024–2025: Team Vorarlberg
- 2026–: Unibet Rose Rockets

Jannis Peter (born 30 October 2000) is a German road cyclist, who rides for UCI ProTeam Unibet Rose Rockets.

Peter competed primarily in track cycling as a junior, notably winning a bronze medal in the team pursuit at the 2018 European Junior Championships. In 2022, he became the German under-23 road race champion. He took his first pro win on the final stage of the 2025 Czech Tour, overtaking Cian Uijtdebroeks in the final meters on a mountain finish. In the process, he moved up to place fourth overall.

== Major results ==
2017
4th Time trial, National Junior Road Championships
2018
3rd Team pursuit, UEC European Junior Track Championships
2019
5th Time trial, National Under-23 Road Championships
2021
4th Time trial, National Under-23 Road Championships
2022
1st Road race, National Under-23 Road Championships
8th Overall Flèche du Sud
2023
10th Overall Oberösterreich Rundfahrt
2024
7th GP Vorarlberg
2025 (1 pro win)
2nd Overall Oberösterreich Rundfahrt

1st Stage 4

4th Overall Czech Tour

1st Stage 4

9th Overall Tour of Austria
10th Overall Tour of Hellas
10th GP Vorarlberg
2026
8th Overall Sibiu Cycling Tour
