= Filip Prokopyszyn =

Polish cyclist (born 2000)

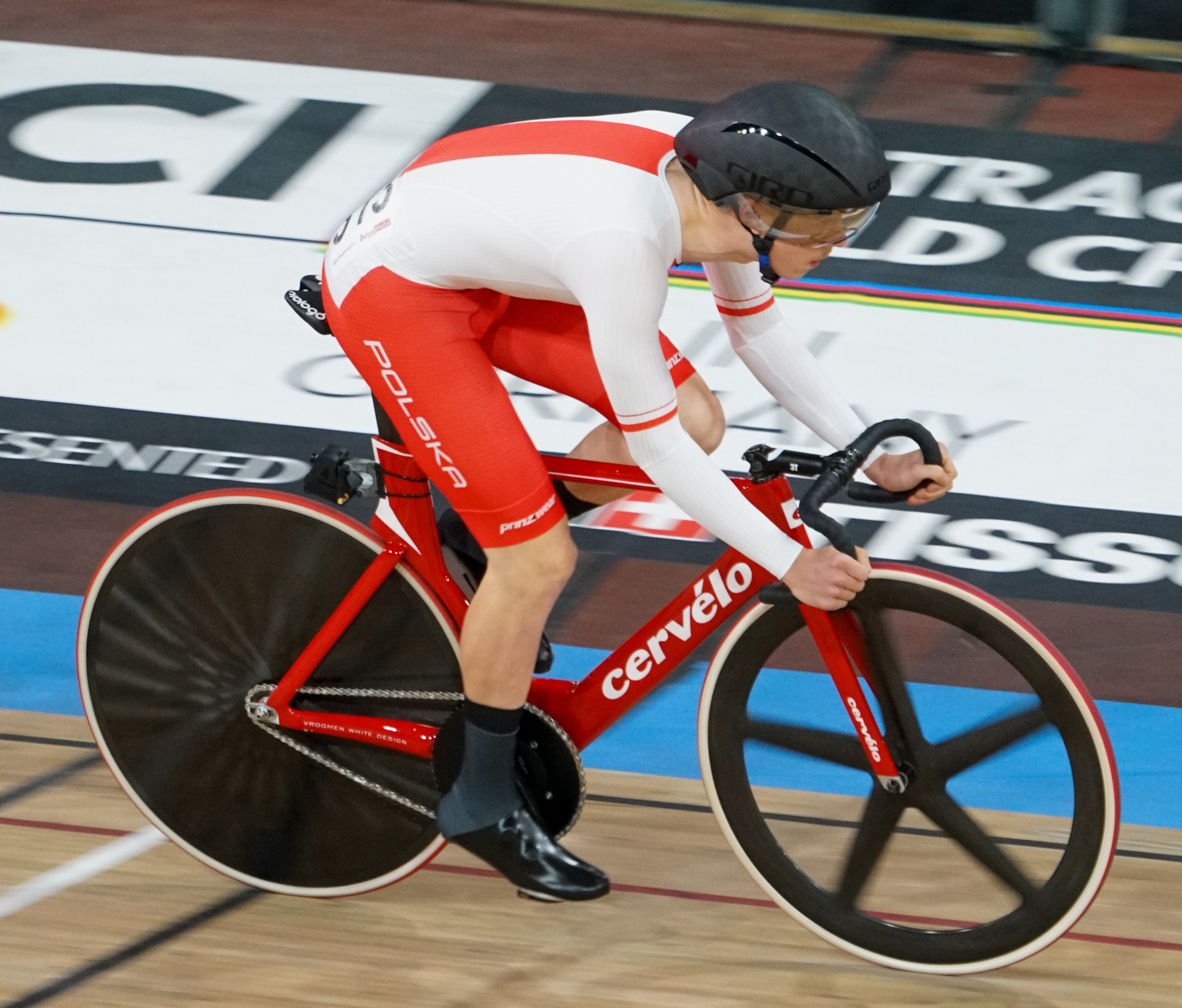
- Prokopyszyn at the 2020 UCI Track World Championships

Personal information
- Full name: Filip Prokopyszyn
- Born: 10 August 2000 (age 26) Zielona Góra, Poland
- Height: 1.80 m (5 ft 11 in)
- Weight: 68 kg (150 lb)

Cycling career
- Sport: Cycling
- Current team: Voster Team
- Disciplines: Track; Road
- Role: Rider
- Rider type: Endurance (track); Sprinter (road)

Amateur team
- 2019–2020: KK Tarnovia Tarnowo Podgórne

Professional teams
- 2021–2022: Mazowsze Serce Polski
- 2023–: Voster ATS Team
Medal record
Men's track cycling
Representing Poland
UEC European Junior Championships
Silver medal – second place	2017 Anadia	Scratch
Silver medal – second place	2018 Aigle	Scratch
Bronze medal – third place	2018 Aigle	Kilo
Bronze medal – third place	2018 Aigle	Madison
UCI Junior World Championships
Silver medal – second place	2017 Montichiari	Scratch
Silver medal – second place	2018 Aigle	Points race
Silver medal – second place	2018 Aigle	Scratch
European Games
Silver medal – second place	2019 Minsk	Scratch
UEC European Championships
Bronze medal – third place	2019 Apeldoorn	Elimination race

Filip Prokopyszyn (born 10 August 2000) is a Polish professional racing cyclist, who currently rides for UCI Continental team Voster Team. In October 2019, he won the bronze medal in the men's elimination race event at the 2019 UEC European Track Championships.

== Major results ==
2017
2nd Scratch, UCI Junior Track World Championships
2nd Scratch, UEC European Junior Championships
2018
UCI Junior Track World Championships

2nd Scratch
2nd Points race

UEC European Junior Championships

2nd Scratch
3rd Madison (with Damian Papierski)
3rd Kilometer

2019
National Track Championships

1st Madison (with Daniel Staniszewski)
1st Elimination race

2nd Scratch, European Games
3rd Elimination, UEC European Track Championships
2020
1st Elimination race, National Track Championships
3rd Madison (with Bartosz Rudyk), UEC European Under-23 Championships
2022
3rd Elimination race, UEC European Under-23 Championships
