= 2023 UAE Tour =

Emirati cycling race

2023 UCI World Tour, race 3 of 35

Race details
- Dates: 20–26 February 2023
- Stages: 7
- Distance: 1,028.2 km (638.9 mi)
- Winning time: 23h 25' 26"

Results
Jersey awarded to the overall winner	Winner	Remco Evenepoel (BEL)	(Soudal–Quick-Step)
	Second	Luke Plapp (AUS)	(Ineos Grenadiers)
	Third	Adam Yates (GBR)	(UAE Team Emirates)
Jersey awarded to the points classification winner	Points	Tim Merlier (BEL)	(Soudal–Quick-Step)
Jersey awarded to the youth classification winner	Youth	Remco Evenepoel (BEL)	(Soudal–Quick-Step)
Jersey awarded to the sprints classification winner	Sprints	Edward Planckaert (BEL)	(Alpecin–Deceuninck)
	Team	(United Arab Emirates) UAE Team Emirates	

The 2023 UAE Tour was a road cycling stage race that took place between 20 and 26 February 2023 in the United Arab Emirates. It was the fifth edition of the UAE Tour, and the third race of the 2023 UCI World Tour.

== Teams ==
UCI WorldTeams

- AG2R Citroën Team
- Alpecin–Deceuninck
- Astana Qazaqstan Team
- Bora–Hansgrohe
- EF Education–EasyPost
- Groupama–FDJ
- Ineos Grenadiers
- Intermarché–Circus–Wanty
- Movistar Team
- Soudal–Quick-Step
- Team Bahrain Victorious
- Team DSM
- Team Jayco–AlUla
- Team Jumbo–Visma
- Trek–Segafredo
- UAE Team Emirates

UCI ProTeams

- Green Project–Bardiani–CSF–Faizanè
- Israel–Premier Tech
- Lotto–Dstny
- Tudor Pro Cycling Team

== Route ==
Stage characteristics and winners
Stage	Date	Course	Distance	Type	Stage winner
1	20 February	Al Dhafra Castle to Al Mirfa	151 km (94 mi)	Flat stage	Tim Merlier (BEL)
2	21 February	Khalifa Port to Khalifa Port	17.2 km (10.7 mi)	Team time trial	Soudal–Quick-Step
3	22 February	Umbrella Beach Al Fujairah to Jebel Jais	185 km (115 mi)	Mountain stage	Einer Rubio (COL)
4	23 February	Al Shindagha to Dubai Harbour	174 km (108 mi)	Flat stage	Juan Sebastián Molano (COL)
5	24 February	Al Marjan Island to Umm al Quwain	182 km (113 mi)	Flat stage	Dylan Groenewegen (NED)
6	25 February	Warner Bros. World Abu Dhabi to Abu Dhabi Breakwater	166 km (103 mi)	Flat stage	Tim Merlier (BEL)
7	26 February	Hazza bin Zayed Stadium to Jebel Hafeet	153 km (95 mi)	Mountain stage	Adam Yates (GBR)
Total			1,028.2 km (638.9 mi)		

== Stages ==
=== Stage 1 ===
20 February 2023 — Al Dhafra Castle to Al Mirfa, 151 km (94 mi)

Stage 1 Result (1–10)
Rank	Rider	Team	Time
1	Tim Merlier (BEL)	Soudal–Quick-Step	3h 17' 35"
2	Caleb Ewan (AUS)	Lotto–Dstny	+ 0"
3	Mark Cavendish (GBR)	Astana Qazaqstan Team	+ 0"
4	Olav Kooij (NED)	Team Jumbo–Visma	+ 0"
5	Nikias Arndt (GER)	Team Bahrain Victorious	+ 0"
6	Phil Bauhaus (GER)	Team Bahrain Victorious	+ 0"
7	Luke Plapp (AUS)	Ineos Grenadiers	+ 0"
8	Remco Evenepoel (BEL)	Soudal–Quick-Step	+ 0"
9	Pello Bilbao (ESP)	Team Bahrain Victorious	+ 0"
10	Cees Bol (NED)	Astana Qazaqstan Team	+ 0"

General classification after Stage 1 (1–10)
Rank	Rider	Team	Time
1	Tim Merlier (BEL)	Soudal–Quick-Step	3h 17' 25"
2	Caleb Ewan (AUS)	Lotto–Dstny	+ 4"
3	Luke Plapp (AUS)	Ineos Grenadiers	+ 5"
4	Mark Cavendish (GBR)	Astana Qazaqstan Team	+ 6"
5	Nikias Arndt (GER)	Team Bahrain Victorious	+ 7"
6	Remco Evenepoel (BEL)	Soudal–Quick-Step	+ 8"
7	Pello Bilbao (ESP)	Team Bahrain Victorious	+ 8"
8	Olav Kooij (NED)	Team Jumbo–Visma	+ 10"
9	Phil Bauhaus (GER)	Team Bahrain Victorious	+ 10"
10	Cees Bol (NED)	Astana Qazaqstan Team	+ 10"

=== Stage 2 ===
21 February 2023 – Khalifa Port to Khalifa Port, 17.2 km (10.7 mi) (TTT)

Stage 2 Result (1–10)
Rank	Team	Time
1	Soudal–Quick-Step	18' 17"
2	EF Education–EasyPost	+ 1"
3	Ineos Grenadiers	+ 3"
4	Team Bahrain Victorious	+ 4"
5	Team Jayco–AlUla	+ 5"
6	Team DSM	+ 10"
7	Bora–Hansgrohe	+ 15"
8	UAE Team Emirates	+ 16"
9	Astana Qazaqstan Team	+ 17"
10	Trek–Segafredo	+ 19"

General classification after stage 2
Rank	Rider	Team	Time
1	Luke Plapp (AUS)	Ineos Grenadiers	3h 35' 50"
2	Remco Evenepoel (BEL)	Soudal–Quick-Step	+ 0"
3	Nikias Arndt (GER)	Team Bahrain Victorious	+ 3"
4	Pello Bilbao (ESP)	Team Jumbo–Visma	+ 4"
5	Mark Cavendish (GBR)	Astana Qazaqstan Team	+ 15"
6	Cees Bol (NED)	Astana Qazaqstan Team	+ 21"
7	Olav Kooij (NED)	Team Jumbo–Visma	+ 23"
8	Bert Van Lerberghe (BEL)	Soudal–Quick-Step	+ 29"
9	Tim Merlier (BEL)	Soudal–Quick-Step	+ 30"
10	Jarrad Drizners (AUS)	Lotto–Dstny	+ 50"

=== Stage 3 ===
22 February 2023 – Umbrella Beach Al Fujairah to Jebel Jais, 185 km (115 mi)

Stage 3 Result (1–10)
Rank	Rider	Team	Time
1	Einer Rubio (COL)	Movistar Team	4h 51' 24"
2	Remco Evenepoel (BEL)	Soudal–Quick-Step	+ 15"
3	Adam Yates (GBR)	UAE Team Emirates	+ 15"
4	Alexey Lutsenko (KAZ)	Astana Qazaqstan Team	+ 15"
5	Luke Plapp (AUS)	Ineos Grenadiers	+ 15"
6	Harm Vanhoucke (BEL)	Team DSM	+ 15"
7	Thomas Gloag (GBR)	Team Jumbo–Visma	+ 15"
8	Andreas Leknessund (NOR)	Team DSM	+ 15"
9	Sepp Kuss (USA)	Team Jumbo–Visma	+ 15"
10	Ben Zwiehoff (GER)	Bora–Hansgrohe	+ 15"

General classification after Stage 3 (1–10)
Rank	Rider	Team	Time
1	Remco Evenepoel (BEL)	Soudal–Quick-Step	8h 27' 22"
2	Luke Plapp (AUS)	Ineos Grenadiers	+ 7"
3	Pello Bilbao (ESP)	Team Bahrain Victorious	+ 11"
4	Stefan de Bod (RSA)	EF Education–EasyPost	+ 1' 01"
5	Wout Poels (NED)	Team Bahrain Victorious	+ 1' 04"
6	Harm Vanhoucke (BEL)	Team DSM	+ 1' 10"
7	Andreas Leknessund (NOR)	Team DSM	+ 1' 10"
8	Einer Rubio (COL)	Movistar Team	+ 1' 11"
9	Georg Steinhauser (GER)	EF Education–EasyPost	+ 1' 11"
10	Adam Yates (GBR)	UAE Team Emirates	+ 1' 12"

=== Stage 4 ===
23 February 2023 – Al Shindagha to Dubai Harbour, 174 km (108 mi)

Stage 4 Result (1–10)
Rank	Rider	Team	Time
1	Juan Sebastián Molano (COL)	UAE Team Emirates	3h 50' 01"
2	Olav Kooij (NED)	Team Jumbo–Visma	+ 0"
3	Sam Welsford (AUS)	Team DSM	+ 0"
4	Arvid de Kleijn (NED)	Tudor Pro Cycling Team	+ 0"
5	Dylan Groenewegen (NED)	Team Jayco–AlUla	+ 0"
6	Danny van Poppel (NED)	Bora–Hansgrohe	+ 0"
7	Marijn van den Berg (NED)	EF Education–EasyPost	+ 0"
8	Sam Bennett (IRL)	Bora–Hansgrohe	+ 0"
9	Tim Merlier (BEL)	Soudal–Quick-Step	+ 0"
10	Jon Aberasturi (ESP)	Trek–Segafredo	+ 0"

General classification after Stage 4 (1–10)
Rank	Rider	Team	Time
1	Remco Evenepoel (BEL)	Soudal–Quick-Step	12h 27' 23"
2	Luke Plapp (AUS)	Ineos Grenadiers	+ 7"
3	Pello Bilbao (ESP)	Team Bahrain Victorious	+ 11"
4	Stefan de Bod (RSA)	EF Education–EasyPost	+ 1' 01"
5	Wout Poels (NED)	Team Bahrain Victorious	+ 1' 04"
6	Harm Vanhoucke (BEL)	Team DSM	+ 1' 10"
7	Andreas Leknessund (NOR)	Team DSM	+ 1' 10"
8	Einer Rubio (COL)	Movistar Team	+ 1' 11"
9	Georg Steinhauser (GER)	EF Education–EasyPost	+ 1' 11"
10	Adam Yates (GBR)	UAE Team Emirates	+ 1' 12"

=== Stage 5 ===
24 February 2023 – Al Marjan Island to Umm al Quwain, 182 km (113 mi)

Stage 5 Result (1–10)
Rank	Rider	Team	Time
1	Dylan Groenewegen (NED)	Team Jayco–AlUla	3h 57' 07"
2	Fernando Gaviria (COL)	Movistar Team	+ 0"
3	Sam Bennett (IRL)	Bora–Hansgrohe	+ 0"
4	Emīls Liepiņš (LAT)	Trek–Segafredo	+ 0"
5	Tim Merlier (BEL)	Soudal–Quick-Step	+ 0"
6	Sam Welsford (AUS)	Team DSM	+ 0"
7	Juan Sebastián Molano (COL)	UAE Team Emirates	+ 0"
8	Mark Cavendish (GBR)	Astana Qazaqstan Team	+ 0"
9	Olav Kooij (NED)	Team Jumbo–Visma	+ 0"
10	Jon Aberasturi (ESP)	Trek–Segafredo	+ 0"

General classification after Stage 5 (1–10)
Rank	Rider	Team	Time
1	Remco Evenepoel (BEL)	Soudal–Quick-Step	16h 14' 28"
2	Luke Plapp (AUS)	Ineos Grenadiers	+ 9"
3	Pello Bilbao (ESP)	Team Bahrain Victorious	+ 13"
4	Stefan de Bod (RSA)	EF Education–EasyPost	+ 1' 03"
5	Wout Poels (NED)	Team Bahrain Victorious	+ 1' 06"
6	Harm Vanhoucke (BEL)	Team DSM	+ 1' 12"
7	Andreas Leknessund (NOR)	Team DSM	+ 1' 12"
8	Einer Rubio (COL)	Movistar Team	+ 1' 13"
9	Georg Steinhauser (GER)	EF Education–EasyPost	+ 1' 13"
10	Adam Yates (GBR)	UAE Team Emirates	+ 1' 14"

=== Stage 6 ===
25 February 2023 – Warner Bros. World Abu Dhabi to Abu Dhabi Breakwater, 166 km (103 mi)

Stage 6 Result (1–10)
Rank	Rider	Team	Time
1	Tim Merlier (BEL)	Soudal–Quick-Step	3h 41' 12"
2	Sam Bennett (IRL)	Bora–Hansgrohe	+ 0"
3	Dylan Groenewegen (NED)	Team Jayco–AlUla	+ 0"
4	Olav Kooij (NED)	Team Jumbo–Visma	+ 0"
5	Fernando Gaviria (COL)	Movistar Team	+ 0"
6	Arvid de Kleijn (NED)	Tudor Pro Cycling Team	+ 0"
7	Sam Welsford (AUS)	Team DSM	+ 0"
8	Gerben Thijssen (BEL)	Intermarché–Circus–Wanty	+ 0"
9	Emīls Liepiņš (LAT)	Trek–Segafredo	+ 0"
10	Phil Bauhaus (GER)	Team Bahrain Victorious	+ 0"

General classification after Stage 6 (1–10)
Rank	Rider	Team	Time
1	Remco Evenepoel (BEL)	Soudal–Quick-Step	19h 55' 40"
2	Luke Plapp (AUS)	Ineos Grenadiers	+ 9"
3	Pello Bilbao (ESP)	Team Bahrain Victorious	+ 13"
4	Stefan de Bod (RSA)	EF Education–EasyPost	+ 1' 03"
5	Wout Poels (NED)	Team Bahrain Victorious	+ 1' 06"
6	Harm Vanhoucke (BEL)	Team DSM	+ 1' 12"
7	Andreas Leknessund (NOR)	Team DSM	+ 1' 12"
8	Einer Rubio (COL)	Movistar Team	+ 1' 13"
9	Georg Steinhauser (GER)	EF Education–EasyPost	+ 1' 13"
10	Adam Yates (GBR)	UAE Team Emirates	+ 1' 14"

=== Stage 7 ===
26 February 2023 – Hazza bin Zayed Stadium to Jebel Hafeet, 153 km (95 mi)

Stage 7 Result (1–10)
Rank	Rider	Team	Time
1	Adam Yates (GBR)	UAE Team Emirates	3h 29' 42"
2	Remco Evenepoel (BEL)	Soudal–Quick-Step	+ 10"
3	Geoffrey Bouchard (FRA)	AG2R Citroën Team	+ 42"
4	Sepp Kuss (USA)	Team Jumbo–Visma	+ 47"
5	Pello Bilbao (ESP)	Team Bahrain Victorious	+ 54"
6	Luke Plapp (AUS)	Ineos Grenadiers	+ 54"
7	Wout Poels (NED)	Team Bahrain Victorious	+ 1' 16"
8	Antonio Tiberi (ITA)	Trek–Segafredo	+ 1' 16"
9	Ben Zwiehoff (GER)	Bora–Hansgrohe	+ 1' 25"
10	Michael Storer (AUS)	Groupama–FDJ	+ 1' 25"

General classification after Stage 7 (1–10)
Rank	Rider	Team	Time
1	Remco Evenepoel (BEL)	Soudal–Quick-Step	23h 25' 26"
2	Luke Plapp (AUS)	Ineos Grenadiers	+ 59"
3	Adam Yates (GBR)	UAE Team Emirates	+ 1' 00"
4	Pello Bilbao (ESP)	Team Bahrain Victorious	+ 1' 03"
5	Sepp Kuss (USA)	Team Jumbo–Visma	+ 2' 06"
6	Wout Poels (NED)	Team Bahrain Victorious	+ 2' 18"
7	Antonio Tiberi (ITA)	Trek–Segafredo	+ 2' 33"
8	Ben Zwiehoff (GER)	Bora–Hansgrohe	+ 2' 38"
9	Emanuel Buchmann (GER)	Bora–Hansgrohe	+ 2' 38"
10	Harm Vanhoucke (BEL)	Team DSM	+ 2' 40"

== Classification leadership table ==
Classification leadership by stage
Stage	Winner	General classification	Points classification	Sprints classification	Young rider classification	Team classification
1	Tim Merlier	Tim Merlier	Tim Merlier (Note: On stage 2, Nikias Arndt, who was third in the points classification, wore the green jersey because first placed Tim Merlier wore the red jersey as the leader of the general classification, while second-placed Luke Plapp wore the white jersey as leader of the young rider classification.)	Luke Plapp (Note: On stage 2, Pello Bilbao, who was third in the sprints classification, wore the black jersey because first placed Luke Plapp wore the white jersey as the leader of the youth classification, while second-placed Nikias Arndt wore the green jersey.) (Note: On stage 3, Nikias Arndt, who was second in the sprints classification, wore the black jersey because first placed Luke Plapp wore the red jersey as the leader of the general classification.)	Luke Plapp (Note: On stage 3, Olav Kooij, who was third in the youth classification, wore the white jersey because first placed Luke Plapp wore the red jersey as the leader of the general classification, while second-placed Remco Evenepoel wore the Rainbow jersey as current World Champion.)	Soudal–Quick-Step
2	Soudal–Quick-Step	Luke Plapp	Tim Merlier	Luke Plapp	Luke Plapp	Soudal–Quick-Step
3	Einer Rubio	Remco Evenepoel	Luke Plapp	Edward Planckaert	Remco Evenepoel (Note: On stage 4, Andreas Leknessund, who was third in the youth classification, wore the white jersey because first placed Remco Evenepoel wore the red jersey as the leader of the general classification, while second-placed Luke Plapp wore the green jersey as leader of the points classification.) (Note: On stages 5, 6, and 7, Luke Plapp, who was second in the youth classification, wore the white jersey because first placed Remco Evenepoel wore the red jersey as the leader of the general classification.)	EF Education–EasyPost
4	Juan Sebastián Molano	Remco Evenepoel	Olav Kooij	Edward Planckaert	Remco Evenepoel	EF Education–EasyPost
5	Dylan Groenewegen	Remco Evenepoel	Tim Merlier	Edward Planckaert	Remco Evenepoel	EF Education–EasyPost
6	Tim Merlier	Remco Evenepoel	Tim Merlier	Edward Planckaert	Remco Evenepoel	EF Education–EasyPost
7	Adam Yates	Remco Evenepoel	Tim Merlier	Edward Planckaert	Remco Evenepoel	UAE Team Emirates
Final		Remco Evenepoel	Tim Merlier	Edward Planckaert	Remco Evenepoel	UAE Team Emirates

== Classification standings ==
Legend
Denotes the winner of the general classification	Denotes the winner of the sprints classification
Denotes the winner of the points classification	Denotes the winner of the young rider classification

=== General classification ===
Final general classification (1–10)
Rank	Rider	Team	Time
1	Remco Evenepoel (BEL)	Soudal–Quick-Step	23h 25' 26"
2	Luke Plapp (AUS)	Ineos Grenadiers	+ 59"
3	Adam Yates (GBR)	UAE Team Emirates	+ 1' 00"
4	Pello Bilbao (ESP)	Team Bahrain Victorious	+ 1' 03"
5	Sepp Kuss (USA)	Team Jumbo–Visma	+ 2' 06"
6	Wout Poels (NED)	Team Bahrain Victorious	+ 2' 18"
7	Antonio Tiberi (ITA)	Trek–Segafredo	+ 2' 33"
8	Ben Zwiehoff (GER)	Bora–Hansgrohe	+ 2' 38"
9	Emanuel Buchmann (GER)	Bora–Hansgrohe	+ 2' 38"
10	Harm Vanhoucke (BEL)	Team DSM	+ 2' 40"

=== Points classification ===
Final points classification (1–10)
Rank	Rider	Team	Points
1	Tim Merlier (BEL)	Soudal–Quick-Step	52
2	Remco Evenepoel (BEL)	Soudal–Quick-Step	45
3	Dylan Groenewegen (NED)	Team Jayco–AlUla	39
4	Olav Kooij (NED)	Team Jumbo–Visma	36
5	Edward Planckaert (BEL)	Alpecin–Deceuninck	34
6	Adam Yates (GBR)	UAE Team Emirates	32
7	Sam Bennett (IRL)	Bora–Hansgrohe	31
8	Sam Welsford (AUS)	Team DSM	30
9	Luke Plapp (AUS)	Ineos Grenadiers	29
10	Samuele Zoccarato (ITA)	Green Project–Bardiani–CSF–Faizanè	24

=== Sprints classification ===
Final sprints classification (1–10)
Rank	Rider	Team	Points
1	Edward Planckaert (BEL)	Alpecin–Deceuninck	34
2	Samuele Zoccarato (ITA)	Green Project–Bardiani–CSF–Faizanè	24
3	Luke Plapp (AUS)	Ineos Grenadiers	13
4	Remco Evenepoel (BEL)	Soudal–Quick-Step	10
5	Alex Baudin (FRA)	AG2R Citroën Team	10
6	Nikias Arndt (GER)	Team Bahrain Victorious	9
7	Thomas De Gendt (BEL)	Lotto–Dstny	9
8	Jaakko Hänninen (FIN)	AG2R Citroën Team	8
9	Sam Welsford (AUS)	Team DSM	8
10	Josef Černý (CZE)	Soudal–Quick-Step	8

=== Young rider classification ===
Final young rider classification (1–10)
Rank	Rider	Team	Time
1	Remco Evenepoel (BEL)	Soudal–Quick-Step	23h 25' 26"
2	Luke Plapp (AUS)	Ineos Grenadiers	+ 59"
3	Antonio Tiberi (ITA)	Trek–Segafredo	+ 2' 33"
4	Einer Rubio (COL)	Movistar Team	+ 2' 57"
5	Brandon McNulty (USA)	UAE Team Emirates	+ 3' 02"
6	Matthew Riccitello (USA)	Israel–Premier Tech	+ 3' 18"
7	Valentin Paret-Peintre (FRA)	AG2R Citroën Team	+ 3' 29"
8	Andreas Leknessund (NOR)	Team DSM	+ 3' 39"
9	Yannis Voisard (SUI)	Tudor Pro Cycling Team	+ 3' 41"
10	Georg Steinhauser (GER)	EF Education–EasyPost	+ 3' 50"

=== Teams classification ===
Final team classification (1–10)
Rank	Team	Time
1	(United Arab Emirates) UAE Team Emirates	69h 48' 08"
2	(France) AG2R Citroën Team	+ 1' 15"
3	(United States) EF Education–EasyPost	+ 1' 41"
4	(Netherlands) Team Jumbo–Visma	+ 6' 37"
5	(Belgium) Intermarché–Circus–Wanty	+ 6' 58"
6	(Belgium) Soudal–Quick-Step	+ 7' 09"
7	(United States) Trek–Segafredo	+ 7' 19"
8	Israel–Premier Tech	+ 10' 02"
9	(Kazakhstan) Astana Qazaqstan Team	+ 10' 39"
10	Team Bahrain Victorious	+ 11' 23"
