= Blake Quick =

Australian cyclist (born 2000)

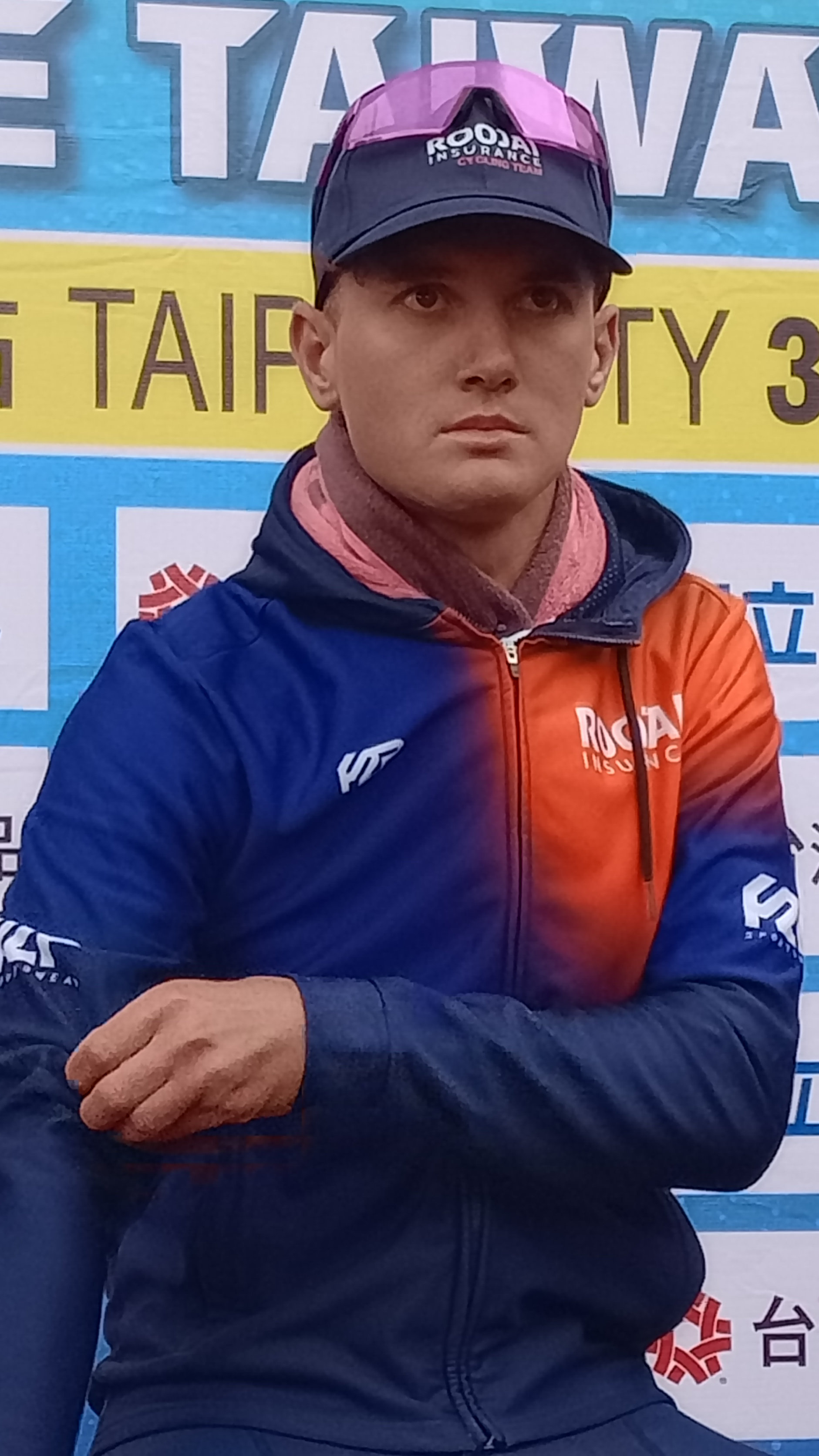
- Blake Quick at 2025 Tour de Taiwan

Personal information
- Born: 16 February 2000 (age 26) Brisbane, Australia
- Height: 1.87 m (6 ft 2 in)
- Weight: 77 kg (170 lb)

Cycling career
- Sport: Cycling
- Current team: Roojai Insurance Winspace
- Disciplines: Road; Track
- Role: Rider
- Rider type: Sprinter

Amateur teams
- 2017: Balmoral Elite Team
- 2017: Cobra9 Interbuild Racing
- 2021–2022: InForm TMX MAKE

Professional teams
- 2019–2020: St George Continental Cycling Team
- 2021–2022: Trinity Racing
- 2023–2024: Team Jayco–AlUla
- 2025–: Roojai Insurance

Blake Quick (born 26 February 2000) is an Australian racing cyclist, who currently rides for UCI Continental team Roojai Insurance Winspace.

== Major results ==
=== Road ===
2018
2nd Criterium, National Junior Championships
2019
1st Points classification, Tour of Fuzhou
2022
1st Road race, National Under-23 Championships
2023
2nd Criterium, National Championships
2025 (1 pro win)
1st Stage 1 Tour de Taiwan
3rd Criterium, National Championships

=== Track ===
2017
1st Omnium, National Junior Championships
2018
UCI World Junior Championships

1st Madison (with Luke Plapp)
3rd Team pursuit
3rd Omnium

3rd Madison, National Championships
2019
National Championships

2nd Individual pursuit
3rd Madison
