= 2019 UEC European Track Championships – Men's elimination race =

Men's elimination race at the 2019 UEC European Track Championships
- Venue: Omnisport Apeldoorn, Apeldoorn
- Date: 16 October
- Competitors: 18 from 18 nations

Medalists
gold medal	Elia Viviani	Italy
silver medal	Bryan Coquard	France
bronze medal	Filip Prokopyszyn	Poland

The men's elimination race competition at the 2019 UEC European Track Championships was held on 16 October 2019.

== Results ==
Rank	Name	Nation
1st place, gold medalist(s)	Elia Viviani	Italy
2nd place, silver medalist(s)	Bryan Coquard	France
3rd place, bronze medalist(s)	Filip Prokopyszyn	Poland
4	Matthew Walls	Great Britain
5	Rui Oliveira	Portugal
6	Óscar Pelegrí	Spain
7	Daniel Babor	Czech Republic
8	Lukas Rüegg	Switzerland
9	Sergey Rostovtsev	Russia
10	Maximilian Beyer	Germany
11	Stefan Matzner	Austria
12	Roman Gladysh	Ukraine
13	Zafeiris Volikakis	Greece
14	Roy Pieters	Netherlands
15	Viktor Filutás	Hungary
16	Lukáš Kubiš	Slovakia
17	Raman Ramanau	Belarus
18	Jules Hesters	Belgium
