= Luke Plapp =

Australian cyclist (born 2000)

Lucas Plapp
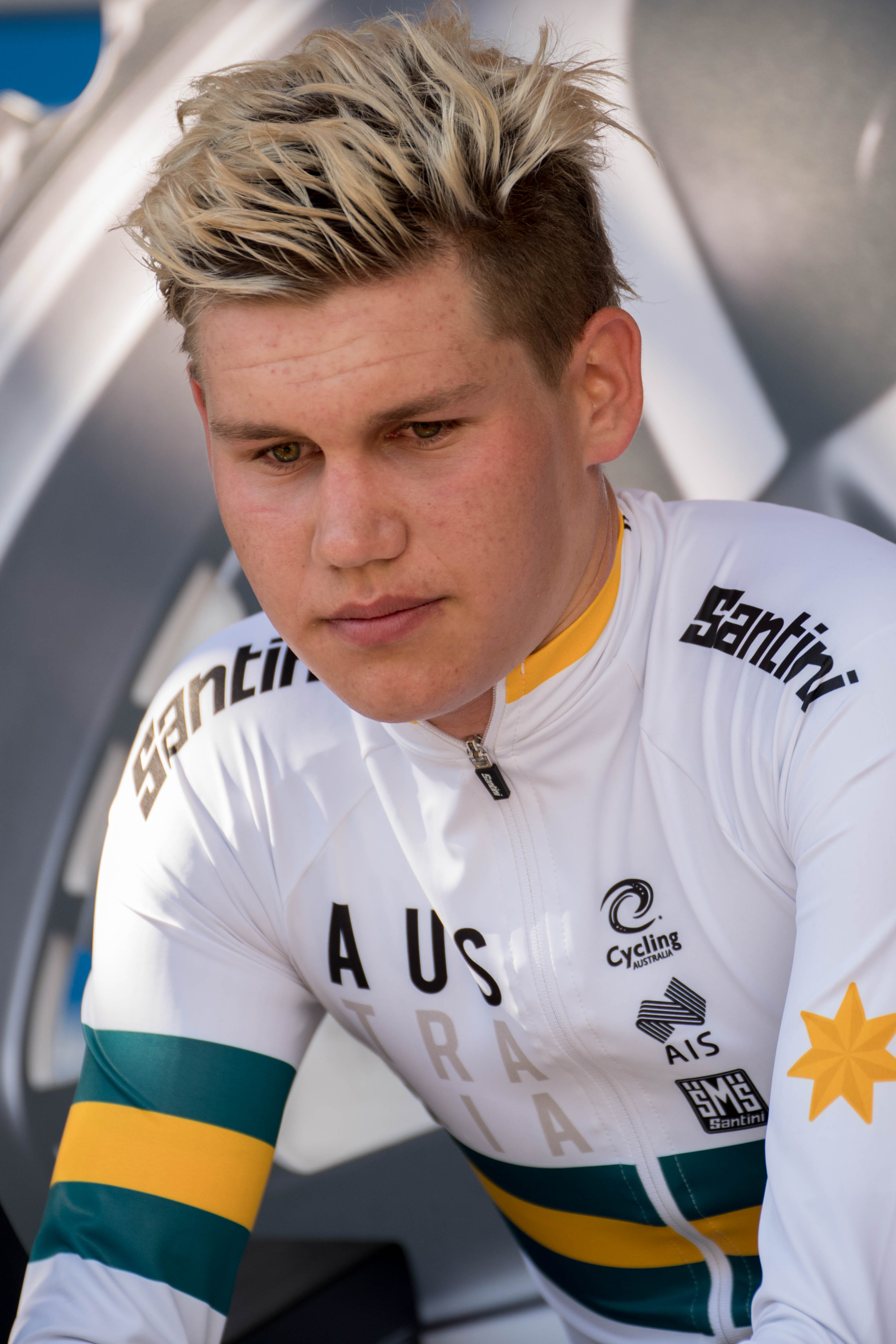
- Plapp at the 2018 UCI World Championships in Innsbruck

Personal information
- Nickname: Plappy
- Born: 25 December 2000 (age 25) Melbourne, Australia
- Height: 1.81 m (5 ft 11 in)

Cycling career
- Sport: Cycling
- Current team: Team Jayco–AlUla
- Disciplines: Road; Track
- Role: Rider
- Rider type: All-Rounder, Time trialist

Amateur teams
- 2010–2017: Brunswick Cycling Club
- 2017–2018: Nero-Kom Racing
- 2019–2021: Inform TM Insight Make

Professional teams
- 2019–2020: Australian Podium; Potential Academy (track)
- 2021: INEOS Grenadiers (stagiaire)
- 2022–2023: INEOS Grenadiers
- 2024–: Team Jayco–AlUla

Major wins
- Grand Tours Giro d'Italia 1 individual stage (2025) One-day races and Classics National Time Trial Championships (2021, 2024, 2025) National Road Race Championships (2022, 2023, 2024)
Medal record
Representing Australia
Men's track cycling
Olympic Games
Bronze medal – third place	2020 Tokyo	Team pursuit
Commonwealth Games
Bronze medal – third place	2022 Birmingham	Team pursuit
UCI Junior Track World Championships
Gold medal – first place	2018 Aigle	Points
Gold medal – first place	2018 Aigle	Madison
Bronze medal – third place	2018 Aigle	Team pursuit
Men's road bicycle racing
World Championships
Gold medal – first place	2025 Kigali	Mixed team relay
Silver medal – second place	2021 Brugge	Under-23 time trial
Bronze medal – third place	2022 Wollongong	Mixed team relay

Lucas Plapp (born 25 December 2000) is an Australian road and track cyclist, who currently rides for UCI WorldTeam Team Jayco–AlUla. He is an alumnus of Maribyrnong Sports Academy, class of 2018.

== Career ==
=== Junior career ===
In August 2018, Plapp won the points race as well as the Madison with Blake Quick at the UCI Junior Track World Championships in Aigle, Switzerland. Plapp also placed 2nd to Remco Evenepoel in the time trial at the 2018 UCI Junior Road World Championships in Innsbruck, Austria. Plapp is part of the AusCycling High Performance Podium Academy and was selected to compete in the Team pursuit at the 2020 Summer Olympics, where they won the bronze medal.

=== Professional career ===
Plapp rode as a stagiaire for UCI WorldTeam INEOS Grenadiers in 2021 before joining them full-time in 2022. On 16 January 2022, he won the Australian National Road Race Championships after chasing down and passing James Whelan with under 10 kilometres (6.2 mi) left, before finishing solo. Plapp made his World tour debut in February 2022 at the UAE Tour where he rode in support of teammate Adam Yates who finished 2nd overall. Plapp himself managed his first World Tour top 5 on the 7th and final stage to Jebal Hafeet in which he finished in 5th place, 16 seconds behind winner Tadej Pogačar.

== Major results ==
=== Road ===
2017
7th Time trial, Oceania Junior Championships
2018
1st Time trial, Oceania Junior Championships
1st Time trial, National Junior Championships
2nd Time trial, UCI World Junior Championships
2019
2nd Time trial, National Under-23 Championships
5th Time trial, Oceania Under-23 Championships
2020
1st Time trial, National Under-23 Championships
2021 (1 pro win)
1st Time trial, National Championships
2nd Time trial, UCI World Under-23 Championships
2022 (1)
1st Road race, National Championships
3rd Team relay, UCI World Championships
3rd Overall Tour of Norway
Commonwealth Games

5th Time trial
6th Road race

9th Overall Tour de Romandie
2023 (1)
1st Road race, National Championships
2nd Overall UAE Tour
2024 (2)
National Championships

1st Time trial
1st Road race

6th Overall Paris–Nice
Giro d'Italia

Held after Stage 7

2025 (3)
UCI World Championships

1st Team relay
7th Time trial

National Championships

1st Time trial
2nd Road race

1st Stage 8 Giro d'Italia
1st Stage 2 International Tour of Hellas
6th Overall Tour Down Under
7th Clásica de San Sebastián
2026
2nd Road race, National Championships
3rd Overall UAE Tour
3rd Overall Tour de Hongrie
3rd Muscat Classic
5th Overall Tour de Romandie

=== General classification results timeline ===
Grand Tour general classification results
Grand Tour	2022	2023	2024	2025	2026
Giro d'Italia	—	—	52	DNF	—
Tour de France	—	—	—	121	
Vuelta a España	95	—	—	—	
Major stage race general classification results
Race	2022	2023	2024	2025	2026
Paris–Nice	—	—	6	—	—
Tirreno–Adriatico	—	—	—	—	—
Volta a Catalunya	DNF	DNS	—	—	—
Tour of the Basque Country	—	DNF	—	—	—
Tour de Romandie	9	—	DNF	72	5
Critérium du Dauphiné	—	—	—	—	
Tour de Suisse	—	—	—	—	

Legend
—	Did not compete
DNF	Did not finish

=== Track ===
2018
UCI World Junior Championships

1st Points race
1st Madison (with Blake Quick)
3rd Team pursuit

National Junior Championships

1st Team pursuit
1st Scratch

3rd Team pursuit, UCI World Cup, Hong Kong
2019
National Championships

1st Individual pursuit
1st Team pursuit
3rd Points race

1st Team pursuit, UCI World Cup, Brisbane
2021
3rd Team pursuit, Olympic Games
3rd Madison, National Championships (with Jensen Plowright)
2022
3rd Team pursuit, Commonwealth Games
