= Reto Müller (musicologist) =

Swiss musicologist

Reto Müller (born February 1964, Basel) is a Swiss musicologist focusing on Gioachino Rossini.

Müller has been studying Rossini's work since 1979 (full-time since 2010). Since 1991 he has been providing advisory and organizational services to the bel canto Opera festival Rossini in Wildbad. Since 1992 he has also been active in the Fondazione Rossini (Pesaro / Italy), including the publications Bollettino del Centro rossiniano di studi and Lettere e Documenti. In 2011 he was appointed Member and Secretary of the Scientific Committee of the Fondazione Rossini.

Müller is a leader of the Deutsche Rossini Gesellschaft (DRG) which he had joined in 1990 (Secretary, 1993–96; Managing Chair since 1996). He serves as editor of DRG-bulletin and the DRG's annual journal "La Gazzetta."

== Exhibitions ==
- Rossini a Napoli, Teatro di San Carlo, Naples; December 1991 to January 1992
- Rossini im Portrait, Foyer of the Staatsoper Stuttgart; 15 May to 1 July 1993
- Hommage an Rossini, Gallery in GENO-Haus Stuttgart; June 9 to 7 July 1999
- Hommage an Rossini, Trinkhalle Bad Wildbad; 11 to 25 July 1999

== Bibliography ==
- Hommage an Rossini. Kommentierter Katalog in Hommage an Rossini, 1999
- Rossini in Bad Kissingen in La Gazzetta, 2003
- Rossini und das Libretto - Hinweise in Briefen und Dokumenten in Rossini und das Libretto. Tagungsband, 2010
- Rossini e Hiller attraverso i documenti e gli scritti in Bollettino del Centro Rossiniano di Studi, 1992
- Rossini nel giudizio di Amadeus Wendt in Bollettino del Centro Rossiniano di Studi, 1999
- Über Amadeus Wendt und das erste deutsche Rossini-Buch in Stendhal/Wendt:Rossini's Leben und Treiben, 2003
- Die Urfassung von Rossinis 'Stabat Mater' in Rossini in Paris, 2002
- 'La Cenerentola'. Der Triumph der Güte, Programm Rossini in Wildbad, 2010
- Rossinis 'Messa di Gloria' und das Musikleben Neapels von 1819/20 in der Wahrnehmung des sächischen Komponisten Carl Borromäus von Miltitz, in La Gazzetta, 2012
- Gioachino Rossini: Guillaume Tell (Wilhelm Tell) (Operntexte der Deutschen Rossini Gesellschaft), 2 July 2013
- Gioachino Rossini: Il viaggio a Reims ossia L'albergo del Giglio d'Oro (Die Reise nach Reims oder Das Hotel zur goldenen Lilie) (Operntexte der Deutschen Rossini Gesellschaft), 25 June 2014 (with Luigi Balochi)
- Gioachino Rossini: Bianca e Falliero (Operntexte der Deutschen Rossini Gesellschaft) Broschiert, 18 May 2015
- Lo 'Stabat Mater' del 1832: Rossini (e Tadolini) alla crociata del 'Mufti' in Quaderni della Fondazione Donizetti, 44, 2015
- Gioachino Rossini: Sigismondo (Sigismund) (Operntexte der Deutschen Rossini Gesellschaft), 4 February 2016

A complete bibliography of Müller's Rossini studies and articles is available at the DRG portal.

== Sources ==
- "Dienstleistungen rund um Giaochino Rossini - Über Reto Müller". "Go Rossini" web portal.
- "Rossini-Bibliographie von Reto Müller". DRG portal - bibliography of Reto Müller's Rossini studies and articles.
