= Mont-sur-Marchienne =

Mont-sur-Marchienne Mont-dzeu-Mårciene (Walloon)
- Former municipality of Belgium
- Coat of arms

- Location in the municipality of Charleroi

- Location in Belgium
- Coordinates: 50°23′N 4°24′E
- Country: Belgium
- Region: Wallonia
- Community: French Community
- Province: Hainaut
- Municipality: Charleroi

Area
  - Total: 3.54 sq mi (9.16 km^{2})

Population (2001)
  - Total: 11,391
- Time zone: UTC+1 (CET)
  - Summer (DST): UTC+2 (CEST)
- Postal code: 6032
- Area code: 071

Mont-sur-Marchienne (French pronunciation: [mɔ̃ syʁ maʁʃjɛn]; Walloon: Mont-dzeu-Mårciene) is a town of Wallonia and a district of the municipality of Charleroi, located in the province of Hainaut, Belgium.

It was a municipality of its own before the merger of the municipalities in 1977.

== Gallery ==
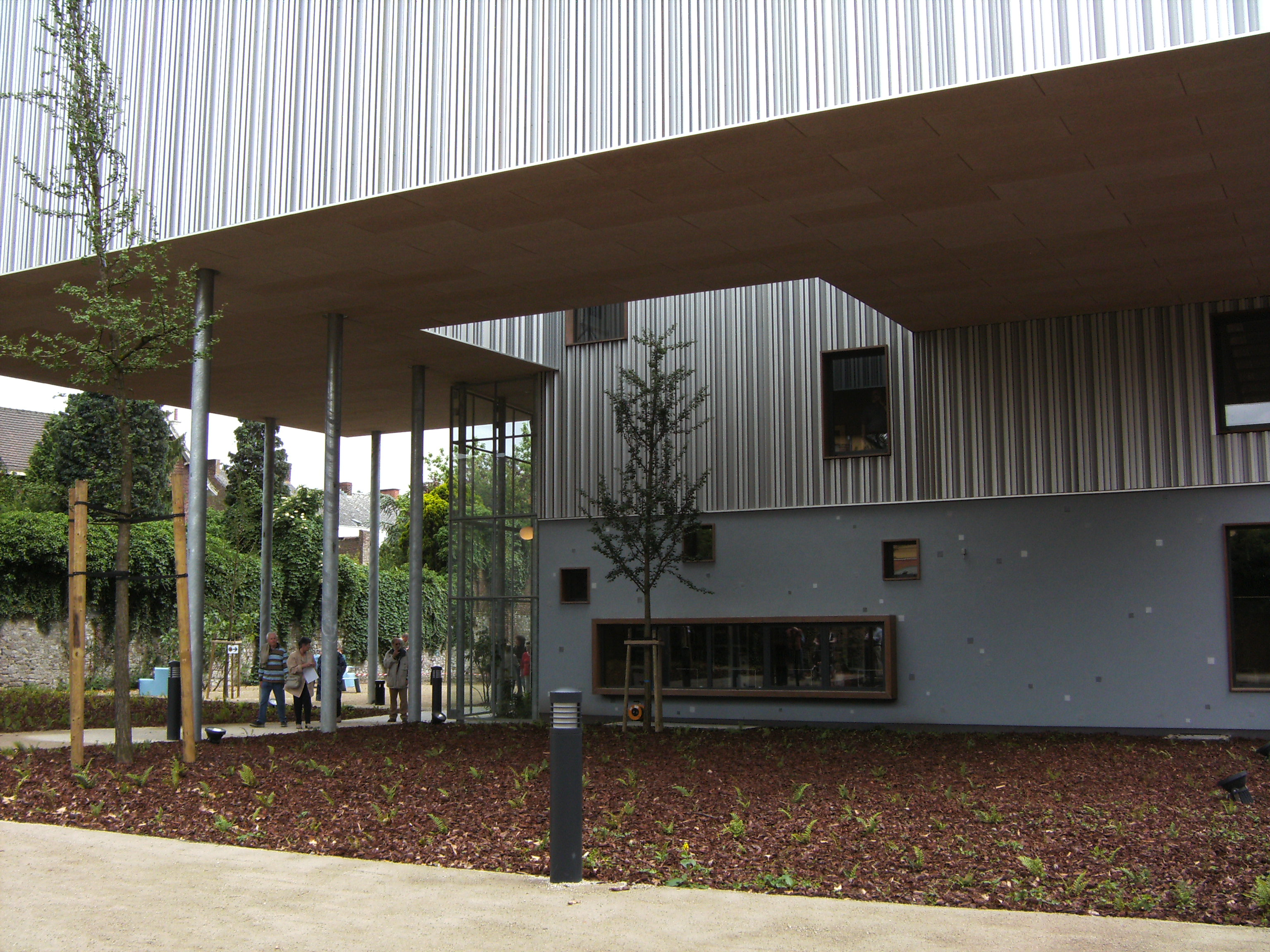
Photography museum in Charleroi

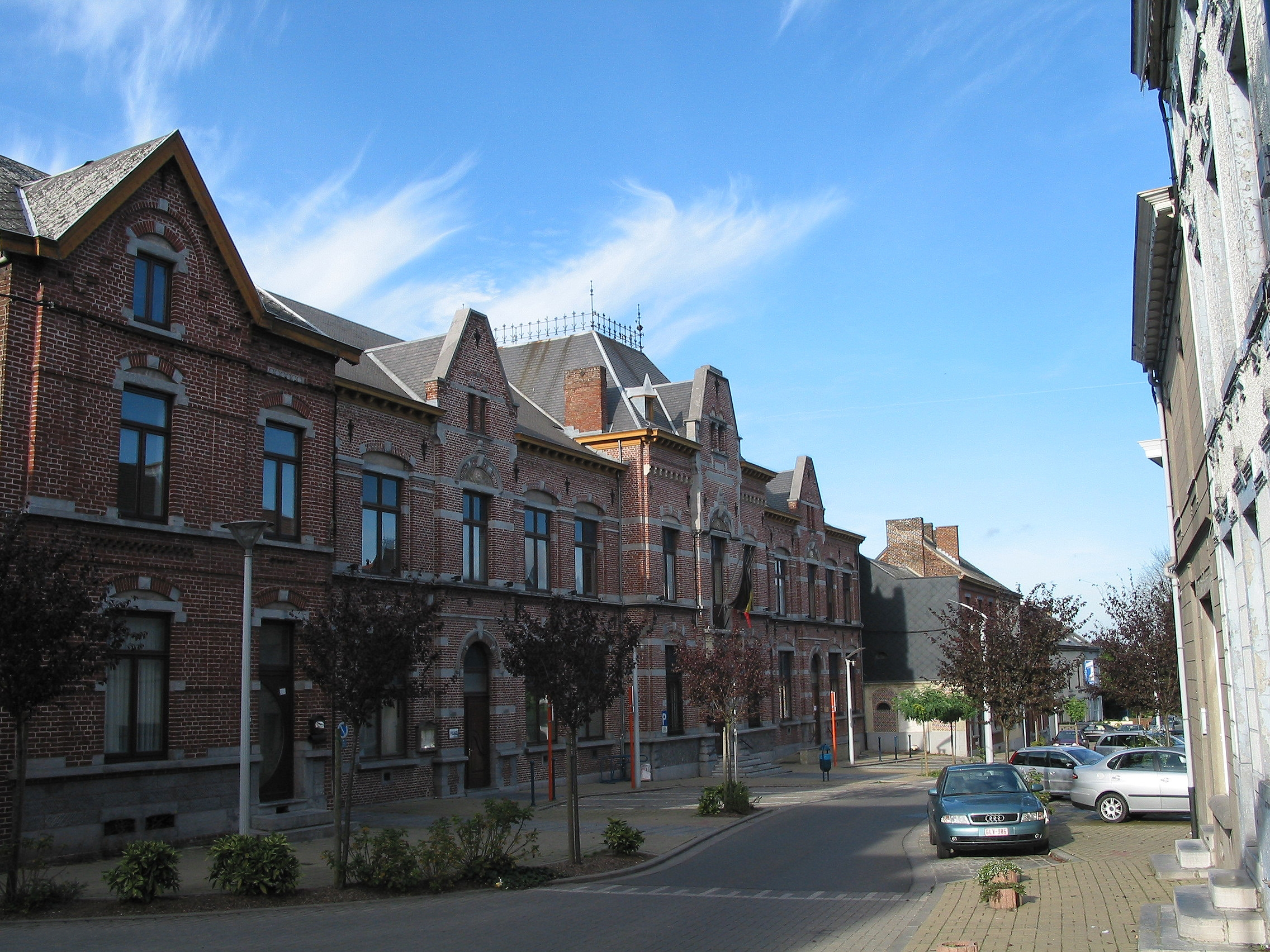
Former town hall

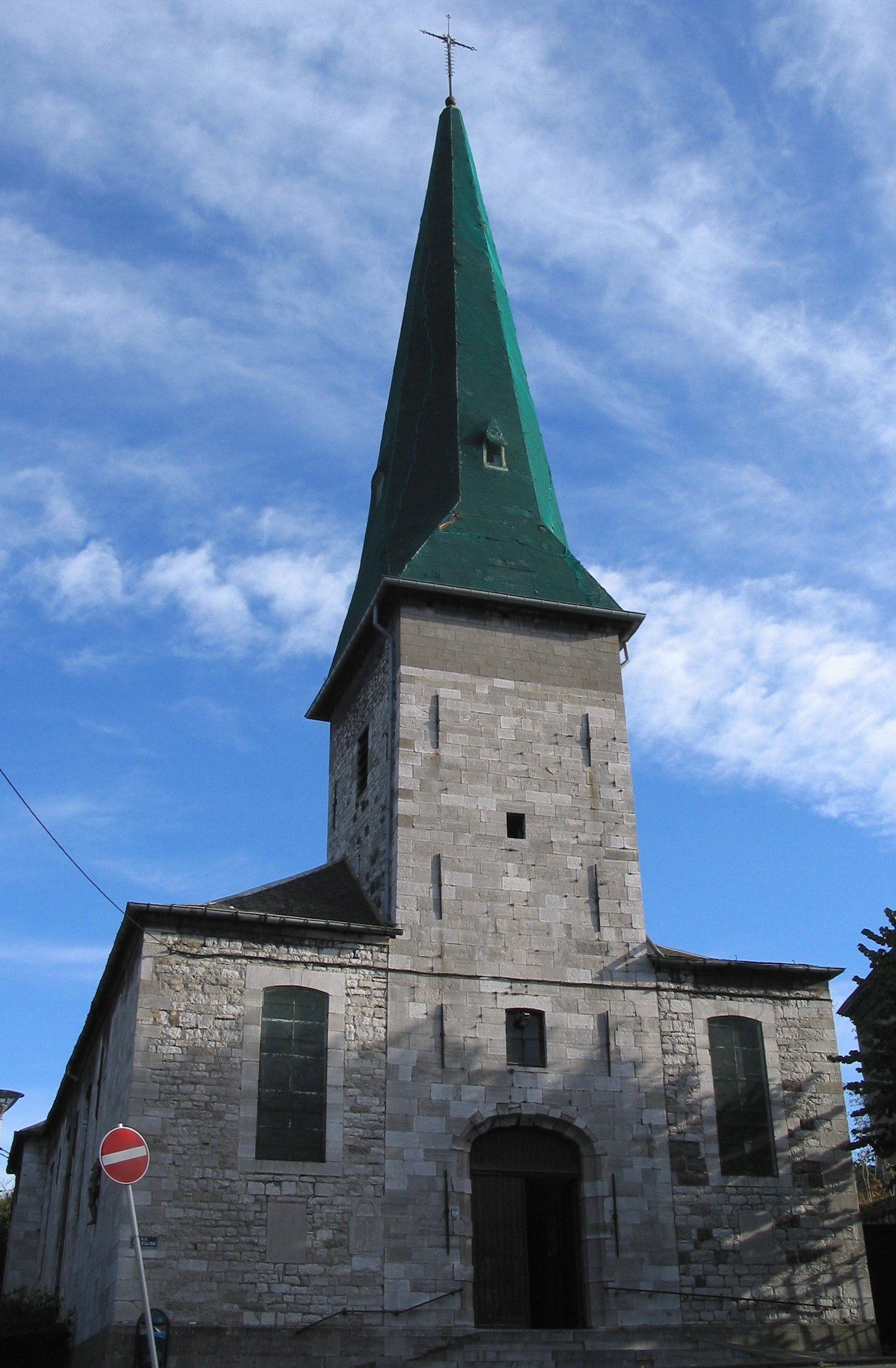
Church of the Conversion of Saint Paul (16th and 18th century).

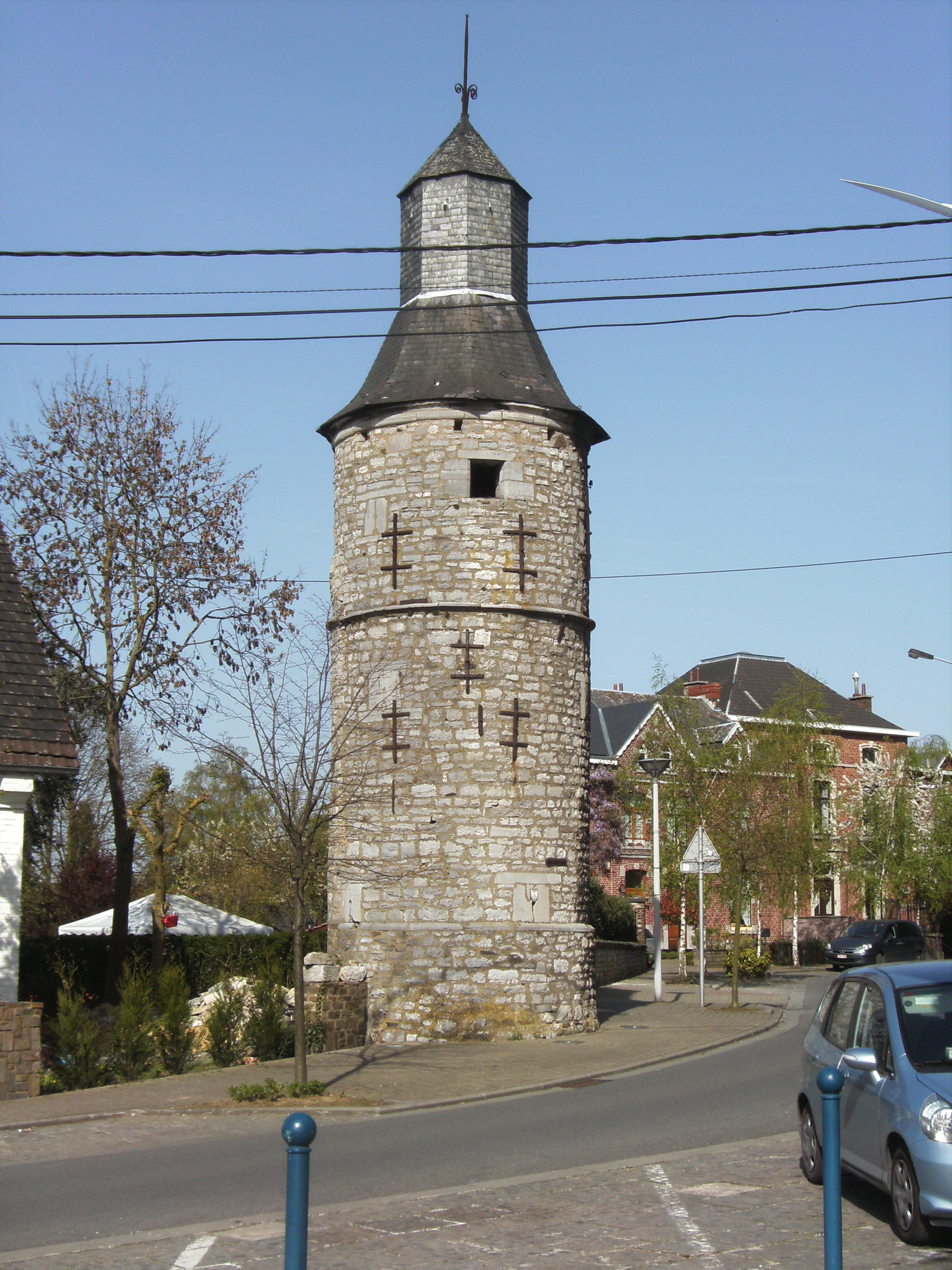
Tower of the former de la Torre castel (French: Château-ferme de la Torre), 16th century.

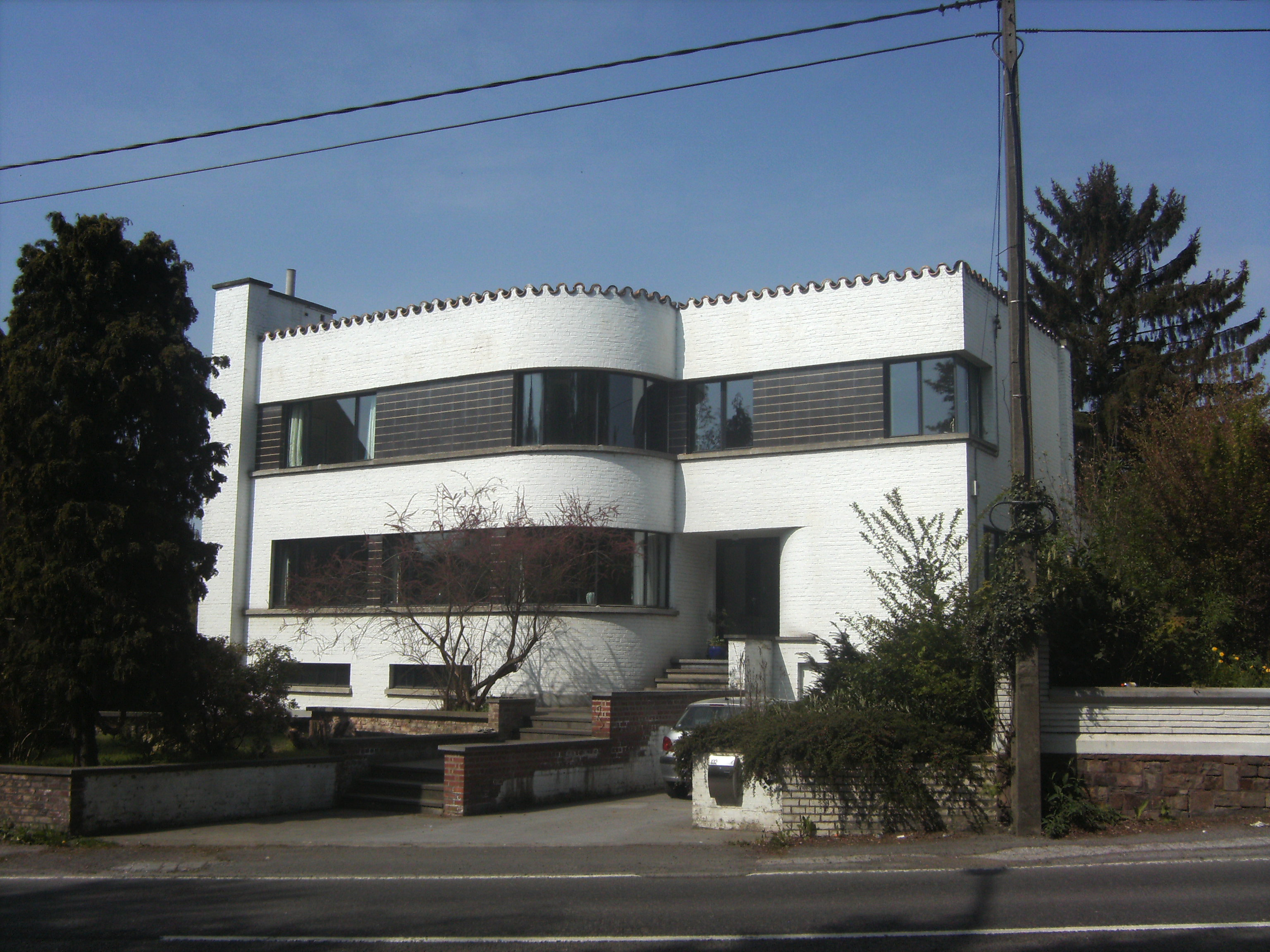
House build in 1935 by Marcel Leborgne
