= 2022 Tour of Norway =

2022 UCI ProSeries

Race details
- Dates: 24 – 29 May 2022
- Stages: 6
- Distance: 1,036.3 km (643.9 mi)
- Winning time: 25h 19' 11"

Results
Jersey awarded to the overall winner	Winner	Remco Evenepoel (BEL)	(Quick-Step Alpha Vinyl Team)
	Second	Jay Vine (AUS)	(Alpecin–Fenix)
	Third	Luke Plapp (AUS)	(Ineos Grenadiers)
Jersey awarded to the points classification winner	Points	Tobias Halland Johannessen (NOR)	(Uno-X Pro Cycling Team)
Jersey awarded to the mountains classification winner	Mountains	Joel Nicolau (ESP)	(Caja Rural–Seguros RGA)
Jersey awarded to the youth classification winner	Youth	Remco Evenepoel (BEL)	(Quick-Step Alpha Vinyl Team)
	Team	Ineos Grenadiers	

The 2022 Tour of Norway is a men's road cycling stage race which takes place from 24 to 29 May 2022. It is the 11th edition of the Tour of Norway, which is rated as a 2.Pro event on the 2022 UCI ProSeries calendar.

== Teams ==
Nine UCI WorldTeams, six UCI ProTeams, and three UCI Continental teams made up the eighteen teams that participated in the race.

UCI WorldTeams

- Bora–Hansgrohe
- EF Education–EasyPost
- Ineos Grenadiers
- Israel–Premier Tech
- Intermarché–Wanty–Gobert Matériaux
- Quick-Step Alpha Vinyl Team
- Team DSM
- Team Jumbo–Visma
- Trek–Segafredo

UCI ProTeams

- Alpecin–Fenix
- Bardiani–CSF–Faizanè
- Caja Rural–Seguros RGA
- Human Powered Health
- Sport Vlaanderen–Baloise
- Uno-X Pro Cycling Team

UCI Continental Teams

- Riwal Cycling Team
- Team ColoQuick
- Team Coop

== Schedule ==
Stage characteristics and winners
Stage	Date	Route	Distance	Type	Stage winner
1	24 May	Bergen to Vossavangen	173.6 km (107.9 mi)	Intermediate stage	Remco Evenepoel (BEL)
2	25 May	Ulvik to Geilo	123.8 km (76.9 mi)	Hilly stage	Ethan Hayter (GBR)
3	26 May	Gol to Stavsro/Gaustatoppen	175.8 km (109.2 mi)	Mountain stage	Remco Evenepoel (BEL)
4	27 May	Hovden to Kristiansand	232.1 km (144.2 mi)	Flat stage	Marco Haller (AUT)
5	28 May	Flekkefjord to Sandnes	181.7 km (112.9 mi)	Hilly stage	Remco Evenepoel (BEL)
6	29 May	Stavanger to Stavanger	149.3 km (92.8 mi)	Flat stage	Alexander Kristoff (NOR)
Total			1,036.3 km (643.9 mi)		

== Stages ==
=== Stage 1 ===
24 May 2022 – Bergen to Vossavangen, 173.6 km (107.9 mi)

Stage 1 Result
Rank	Rider	Team	Time
1	Remco Evenepoel (BEL)	Quick-Step Alpha Vinyl Team	4h 21' 31"
2	Tobias Halland Johannessen (NOR)	Uno-X Pro Cycling Team	+ 0"
3	Eduard Prades (ESP)	Caja Rural–Seguros RGA	+ 2"
4	Luke Plapp (AUS)	Ineos Grenadiers	+ 3"
5	Ethan Hayter (GBR)	Ineos Grenadiers	+ 3"
6	Esteban Chaves (COL)	EF Education–EasyPost	+ 5"
7	Gianluca Brambilla (ITA)	Trek–Segafredo	+ 5"
8	Mike Teunissen (NED)	Team Jumbo–Visma	+ 5"
9	Cian Uijtdebroeks (BEL)	Bora–Hansgrohe	+ 5"
10	Laurens Huys (BEL)	Intermarché–Wanty–Gobert Matériaux	+ 5"

General classification after Stage 1
Rank	Rider	Team	Time
1	Remco Evenepoel (BEL)	Quick-Step Alpha Vinyl Team	4h 21' 21"
2	Tobias Halland Johannessen (NOR)	Uno-X Pro Cycling Team	+ 4"
3	Eduard Prades (ESP)	Caja Rural–Seguros RGA	+ 8"
4	Luke Plapp (AUS)	Ineos Grenadiers	+ 13"
5	Ethan Hayter (GBR)	Ineos Grenadiers	+ 13"
6	Esteban Chaves (COL)	EF Education–EasyPost	+ 15"
7	Gianluca Brambilla (ITA)	Trek–Segafredo	+ 15"
8	Mike Teunissen (NED)	Team Jumbo–Visma	+ 15"
9	Cian Uijtdebroeks (BEL)	Bora–Hansgrohe	+ 15"
10	Laurens Huys (BEL)	Intermarché–Wanty–Gobert Matériaux	+ 15"

=== Stage 2 ===
25 May 2022 – Ulvik to Geilo, 123.8 km (76.9 mi)

Stage 2 Result
Rank	Rider	Team	Time
1	Ethan Hayter (GBR)	Ineos Grenadiers	2h 53' 17"
2	Mike Teunissen (NED)	Team Jumbo–Visma	+ 0"
3	Tobias Halland Johannessen (NOR)	Uno-X Pro Cycling Team	+ 0"
4	Patrick Bevin (NZL)	Israel–Premier Tech	+ 0"
5	Marco Haller (AUT)	Bora–Hansgrohe	+ 0"
6	Kasper Asgreen (DEN)	Quick-Step Alpha Vinyl Team	+ 0"
7	Aaron Van Poucke (BEL)	Sport Vlaanderen–Baloise	+ 0"
8	Jonas Gregaard (DEN)	Uno-X Pro Cycling Team	+ 0"
9	Luke Plapp (AUS)	Ineos Grenadiers	+ 0"
10	Timo Roosen (NED)	Team Jumbo–Visma	+ 0"

General classification after Stage 2
Rank	Rider	Team	Time
1	Tobias Halland Johannessen (NOR)	Uno-X Pro Cycling Team	7h 14' 37"
2	Ethan Hayter (GBR)	Ineos Grenadiers	+ 1"
3	Remco Evenepoel (BEL)	Quick-Step Alpha Vinyl Team	+ 1"
4	Mike Teunissen (NED)	Team Jumbo–Visma	+ 10"
5	Luke Plapp (AUS)	Ineos Grenadiers	+ 14"
6	Carl Fredrik Hagen (NOR)	Israel–Premier Tech	+ 16"
7	Tao Geoghegan Hart (GBR)	Ineos Grenadiers	+ 16"
8	Jay Vine (AUS)	Alpecin–Fenix	+ 16"
9	Patrick Bevin (NZL)	Israel–Premier Tech	+ 26"
10	Marco Brenner (GER)	Team DSM	+ 26"

=== Stage 3 ===
26 May 2022 – Gol to Stavsro/Gaustatoppen, 175.8 km (109.2 mi)

Stage 3 Result
Rank	Rider	Team	Time
1	Remco Evenepoel (BEL)	Quick-Step Alpha Vinyl Team	4h 40' 07"
2	Jay Vine (AUS)	Alpecin–Fenix	+ 27"
3	Luke Plapp (AUS)	Ineos Grenadiers	+ 1' 05"
4	Tobias Halland Johannessen (NOR)	Uno-X Pro Cycling Team	+ 1' 21"
5	Laurens Huys (BEL)	Intermarché–Wanty–Gobert Matériaux	+ 1' 21"
6	Cian Uijtdebroeks (BEL)	Bora–Hansgrohe	+ 1' 23"
7	Esteban Chaves (COL)	EF Education–EasyPost	+ 1' 24"
8	Marco Brenner (GER)	Team DSM	+ 1' 41"
9	Magnus Sheffield (USA)	Ineos Grenadiers	+ 1' 56"
10	Tao Geoghegan Hart (GBR)	Ineos Grenadiers	+ 1' 56"

General classification after Stage 3
Rank	Rider	Team	Time
1	Remco Evenepoel (BEL)	Quick-Step Alpha Vinyl Team	11h 54' 35"
2	Jay Vine (AUS)	Alpecin–Fenix	+ 46"
3	Luke Plapp (AUS)	Ineos Grenadiers	+ 1' 24"
4	Tobias Halland Johannessen (NOR)	Uno-X Pro Cycling Team	+ 1' 30"
5	Marco Brenner (GER)	Team DSM	+ 2' 16"
6	Tao Geoghegan Hart (GBR)	Ineos Grenadiers	+ 2' 21"
7	Patrick Bevin (NZL)	Israel–Premier Tech	+ 2' 41"
8	Magnus Sheffield (USA)	Ineos Grenadiers	+ 2' 41"
9	Laurens Huys (BEL)	Intermarché–Wanty–Gobert Matériaux	+ 2' 44"
10	Cian Uijtdebroeks (BEL)	Bora–Hansgrohe	+ 2' 46"

=== Stage 4 ===
27 May 2022 – Hovden to Kristiansand, 232.1 km (144.2 mi)

Stage 4 Result
Rank	Rider	Team	Time
1	Marco Haller (AUT)	Bora–Hansgrohe	5h 02' 21"
2	Ethan Vernon (GBR)	Quick-Step Alpha Vinyl Team	+ 0"
3	Alexander Kristoff (NOR)	Intermarché–Wanty–Gobert Matériaux	+ 0"
4	Tom Van Asbroeck (BEL)	Israel–Premier Tech	+ 0"
5	Mike Teunissen (NED)	Team Jumbo–Visma	+ 0"
6	Filippo Fiorelli (ITA)	Bardiani–CSF–Faizanè	+ 0"
7	Mads Pedersen (DEN)	Trek–Segafredo	+ 0"
8	Martijn Budding (NED)	Riwal Cycling Team	+ 0"
9	Eduard Prades (ESP)	Caja Rural–Seguros RGA	+ 0"
10	Corbin Strong (NZL)	Israel–Premier Tech	+ 0"

General classification after Stage 4
Rank	Rider	Team	Time
1	Remco Evenepoel (BEL)	Quick-Step Alpha Vinyl Team	16h 56' 56"
2	Jay Vine (AUS)	Alpecin–Fenix	+ 46"
3	Luke Plapp (AUS)	Ineos Grenadiers	+ 1' 24"
4	Tobias Halland Johannessen (NOR)	Uno-X Pro Cycling Team	+ 1' 30"
5	Tao Geoghegan Hart (GBR)	Ineos Grenadiers	+ 2' 21"
6	Magnus Sheffield (USA)	Ineos Grenadiers	+ 2' 41"
7	Laurens Huys (BEL)	Intermarché–Wanty–Gobert Matériaux	+ 2' 44"
8	Cian Uijtdebroeks (BEL)	Bora–Hansgrohe	+ 2' 46"
9	Esteban Chaves (COL)	EF Education–EasyPost	+ 2' 47"
10	Carl Fredrik Hagen (NOR)	Israel–Premier Tech	+ 3' 05"

=== Stage 5 ===
28 May 2022 – Flekkefjord to Sandnes, 181.7 km (112.9 mi)

Stage 5 Result
Rank	Rider	Team	Time
1	Remco Evenepoel (BEL)	Quick-Step Alpha Vinyl Team	4h 53' 33"
2	Tobias Halland Johannessen (NOR)	Uno-X Pro Cycling Team	+ 0"
3	Luke Plapp (AUS)	Ineos Grenadiers	+ 0"
4	Jay Vine (AUS)	Alpecin–Fenix	+ 0"
5	Ben Healy (IRL)	EF Education–EasyPost	+ 0"
6	Magnus Sheffield (USA)	Ineos Grenadiers	+ 0"
7	Laurens Huys (BEL)	Intermarché–Wanty–Gobert Matériaux	+ 0"
8	Cian Uijtdebroeks (BEL)	Bora–Hansgrohe	+ 0"
9	Mike Teunissen (NED)	Team Jumbo–Visma	+ 5"
10	Filippo Fiorelli (ITA)	Bardiani–CSF–Faizanè	+ 5"

General classification after Stage 5
Rank	Rider	Team	Time
1	Remco Evenepoel (BEL)	Quick-Step Alpha Vinyl Team	21h 50' 19"
2	Jay Vine (AUS)	Alpecin–Fenix	+ 56"
3	Luke Plapp (AUS)	Ineos Grenadiers	+ 1' 30"
4	Tobias Halland Johannessen (NOR)	Uno-X Pro Cycling Team	+ 1' 34"
5	Tao Geoghegan Hart (GBR)	Ineos Grenadiers	+ 2' 36"
6	Magnus Sheffield (USA)	Ineos Grenadiers	+ 2' 51"
7	Laurens Huys (BEL)	Intermarché–Wanty–Gobert Matériaux	+ 2' 54"
8	Cian Uijtdebroeks (BEL)	Bora–Hansgrohe	+ 2' 56"
9	Esteban Chaves (COL)	EF Education–EasyPost	+ 3' 02"
10	Carl Fredrik Hagen (NOR)	Israel–Premier Tech	+ 3' 20"

=== Stage 6 ===
29 May 2022 – Stavanger to Stavanger, 149.3 km (92.8 mi)

Stage 6 Result
Rank	Rider	Team	Time
1	Alexander Kristoff (NOR)	Intermarché–Wanty–Gobert Matériaux	3h 28' 52"
2	Ethan Vernon (GBR)	Quick-Step Alpha Vinyl Team	+ 0"
3	Mads Pedersen (DEN)	Trek–Segafredo	+ 0"
4	Timo Kielich (BEL)	Alpecin–Fenix	+ 0"
5	Filippo Fiorelli (ITA)	Bardiani–CSF–Faizanè	+ 0"
6	Timo Roosen (NED)	Team Jumbo–Visma	+ 0"
7	Mike Teunissen (NED)	Team Jumbo–Visma	+ 0"
8	Jenno Berckmoes (BEL)	Sport Vlaanderen–Baloise	+ 0"
9	Niklas Märkl (GER)	Team DSM	+ 0"
10	Martijn Budding (NED)	Riwal Cycling Team	+ 0"

General classification after Stage 6
Rank	Rider	Team	Time
1	Remco Evenepoel (BEL)	Quick-Step Alpha Vinyl Team	25h 19' 11"
2	Jay Vine (AUS)	Alpecin–Fenix	+ 56"
3	Luke Plapp (AUS)	Ineos Grenadiers	+ 1' 30"
4	Tobias Halland Johannessen (NOR)	Uno-X Pro Cycling Team	+ 1' 34"
5	Tao Geoghegan Hart (GBR)	Ineos Grenadiers	+ 2' 36"
6	Magnus Sheffield (USA)	Ineos Grenadiers	+ 2' 51"
7	Laurens Huys (BEL)	Intermarché–Wanty–Gobert Matériaux	+ 2' 54"
8	Cian Uijtdebroeks (BEL)	Bora–Hansgrohe	+ 2' 56"
9	Esteban Chaves (COL)	EF Education–EasyPost	+ 3' 02"
10	Carl Fredrik Hagen (NOR)	Israel–Premier Tech	+ 3' 20"

== Classification leadership table ==
Classification leadership by stage
Stage	Winner	General classification	Points classification	Mountains classification	Young rider classification	Team classification
1	Remco Evenepoel	Remco Evenepoel	Remco Evenepoel	Håkon Aalrust	Remco Evenepoel	Ineos Grenadiers
2	Ethan Hayter	Tobias Halland Johannessen	Ethan Hayter	Håkon Aalrust	Remco Evenepoel	Ineos Grenadiers
3	Remco Evenepoel	Remco Evenepoel	Tobias Halland Johannessen	Remco Evenepoel	Remco Evenepoel	Ineos Grenadiers
4	Marco Haller	Remco Evenepoel	Tobias Halland Johannessen	Remco Evenepoel	Remco Evenepoel	Ineos Grenadiers
5	Remco Evenepoel	Remco Evenepoel	Tobias Halland Johannessen	Joel Nicolau	Remco Evenepoel	Ineos Grenadiers
6	Alexander Kristoff	Remco Evenepoel	Tobias Halland Johannessen	Joel Nicolau	Remco Evenepoel	Ineos Grenadiers
Final		Remco Evenepoel	Tobias Halland Johannessen	Joel Nicolau	Remco Evenepoel	Ineos Grenadiers

- On stage 2, Tobias Halland Johannessen, who was second in the points classification, wore the dark blue jersey, because first placed Remco Evenepoel wore the orange jersey as leader of the general classification. For the same reason, Luke Plapp who was second in the young rider classification, wore the white jersey.
- On stages 4 and 5, Joel Nicolau, who was second in the mountains classification, wore the polkadot jersey, because first placed Remco Evenepoel wore the orange jersey as leader of the general classification. For the same reason, Luke Plapp who was second in the young rider classification, wore the white jersey.
- On stage 6, Luke Plapp, who was second in the young rider classification, wore the white jersey, because first placed Remco Evenepoel wore the orange jersey as leader of the general classification.

== Final classification standings ==
Legend
Denotes the leader of the general classification	Denotes the leader of the mountains classification
Denotes the leader of the points classification	Denotes the leader of the young rider classification

=== General classification ===
Final general classification (1–10)
Rank	Rider	Team	Time
1	Remco Evenepoel (BEL)	Quick-Step Alpha Vinyl Team	25h 19' 11"
2	Jay Vine (AUS)	Alpecin–Fenix	+ 56"
3	Luke Plapp (AUS)	Ineos Grenadiers	+ 1' 30"
4	Tobias Halland Johannessen (NOR)	Uno-X Pro Cycling Team	+ 1' 34"
5	Tao Geoghegan Hart (GBR)	Ineos Grenadiers	+ 2' 36"
6	Magnus Sheffield (USA)	Ineos Grenadiers	+ 2' 51"
7	Laurens Huys (BEL)	Intermarché–Wanty–Gobert Matériaux	+ 2' 54"
8	Cian Uijtdebroeks (BEL)	Bora–Hansgrohe	+ 2' 56"
9	Esteban Chaves (COL)	EF Education–EasyPost	+ 3' 02"
10	Carl Fredrik Hagen (NOR)	Israel–Premier Tech	+ 3' 20"

=== Points classification ===
Final points classification (1–10)
Rank	Rider	Team	Points
1	Tobias Halland Johannessen (NOR)	Uno-X Pro Cycling Team	58
2	Luke Plapp (AUS)	Ineos Grenadiers	50
3	Mike Teunissen (NED)	Team Jumbo–Visma	49
4	Remco Evenepoel (BEL)	Quick-Step Alpha Vinyl Team	48
5	Ethan Hayter (GBR)	Ineos Grenadiers	36
6	Marco Haller (AUT)	Bora–Hansgrohe	31
7	Alexander Kristoff (NOR)	Intermarché–Wanty–Gobert Matériaux	30
8	Filippo Fiorelli (ITA)	Bardiani–CSF–Faizanè	30
9	Jay Vine (AUS)	Alpecin–Fenix	28
10	Ethan Vernon (GBR)	Quick-Step Alpha Vinyl Team	28

=== Mountains classification ===
Final mountains classification (1–10)
Rank	Rider	Team	Points
1	Joel Nicolau (ESP)	Caja Rural–Seguros RGA	32
2	Remco Evenepoel (BEL)	Quick-Step Alpha Vinyl Team	20
3	Ben Healy (IRL)	EF Education–EasyPost	15
4	Tobias Halland Johannessen (NOR)	Uno-X Pro Cycling Team	15
5	André Drege (NOR)	Team Coop	14
6	Embret Svestad-Bårdseng (NOR)	Team Coop	14
7	Håkon Aalrust (NOR)	Team Coop	12
8	Luke Plapp (AUS)	Ineos Grenadiers	11
9	Lucas Eriksson (SWE)	Riwal Cycling Team	11
10	Aaron Van Poucke (BEL)	Sport Vlaanderen–Baloise	10

=== Young rider classification ===
Final young rider classification (1–10)
Rank	Rider	Team	Time
1	Remco Evenepoel (BEL)	Quick-Step Alpha Vinyl Team	25h 19' 11"
2	Luke Plapp (AUS)	Ineos Grenadiers	+ 1' 30"
3	Magnus Sheffield (USA)	Ineos Grenadiers	+ 2' 51"
4	Cian Uijtdebroeks (BEL)	Bora–Hansgrohe	+ 2' 56"
5	Embret Svestad-Bårdseng (NOR)	Team Coop	+ 8' 38"
6	Kevin Vermaerke (USA)	Team DSM	+ 8' 52"
7	Ben Healy (IRL)	EF Education–EasyPost	+ 13' 57"
8	Michel Hessmann (GER)	Team Jumbo–Visma	+ 19' 53"
9	Corbin Strong (NZL)	Israel–Premier Tech	+ 21' 38"
10	Jenno Berckmoes (BEL)	Sport Vlaanderen–Baloise	+ 31' 55"

=== Team classification ===
Final team classification (1–10)
Rank	Team	Time
1	Ineos Grenadiers	76h 04' 16"
2	Israel–Premier Tech	+ 13' 25"
3	Uno-X Pro Cycling Team	+ 15' 06"
4	EF Education–EasyPost	+ 17' 51"
5	Team Jumbo–Visma	+ 21' 48"
6	Quick-Step Alpha Vinyl Team	+ 22' 37"
7	Bora–Hansgrohe	+ 29' 46"
8	Alpecin–Fenix	+ 30' 47"
9	Caja Rural–Seguros RGA	+ 34' 16"
10	Intermarché–Wanty–Gobert Matériaux	+ 51' 06"
