= Friederike Stern =

Austrian field hockey player

Personal information
- Nationality: Austrian
- Born: 13 June 1960 (age 65) Vienna, Austria

Sport
- Sport: Field hockey

Friederike Stern (born 13 June 1960) is an Austrian field hockey player. She competed in the women's tournament at the 1980 Summer Olympics.
