= Laurens Huys =

Belgian cyclist

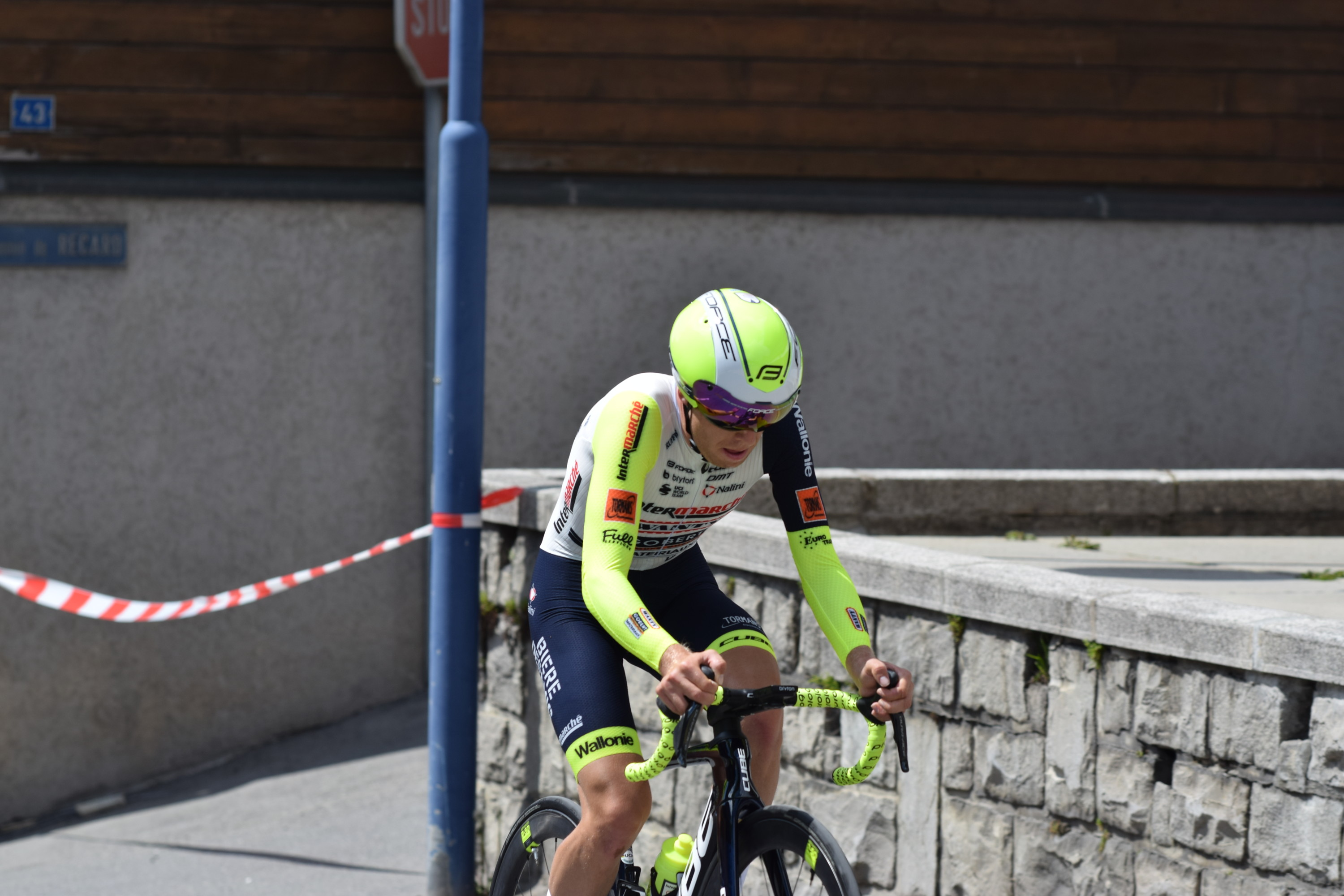
- Huys at 2022 Tour de Romandie

Personal information
- Full name: Laurens Huys
- Born: 24 September 1998 (age 28)
- Height: 1.62 m (5 ft 4 in)
- Weight: 61 kg (134 lb)

Cycling career
- Sport: Cycling
- Current team: Arkéa–B&B Hotels
- Discipline: Road
- Role: Rider

Amateur teams
- 2013–2014: Vérandas Willems–Crabbé Toitures–CC Chevigny Juniors
- 2017–2019: Lotto–Soudal U23
- 2019: Wallonie Bruxelles (stagiaire)

Professional teams
- 2020–2021: Bingoal–Wallonie Bruxelles
- 2022–2023: Intermarché–Wanty–Gobert Matériaux
- 2024–: Arkéa–B&B Hotels

Laurens Huys (born 24 September 1998) is a Belgian cyclist, who currently rides for UCI WorldTeam Arkéa–B&B Hotels.

== Major results ==
2015
7th La Philippe Gilbert Juniors
2016
4th Overall Rhône Alpes-Valromey Tour
2017
1st Stage 1 (TTT) Okolo Jižních Čech
2018
10th Overall Okolo Jižních Čech

1st Stage 1 (TTT)

2019
9th Internationale Wielertrofee Jong Maar Moedig
2020
8th Overall Tour de Hongrie
2021
5th Overall Alpes Isère Tour
6th Overall Tour de Hongrie
2022
7th Overall Tour of Norway
2023
10th Overall Tour du Limousin

=== Grand Tour general classification results timeline ===
Grand Tour	2023
Giro d'Italia	27
Tour de France	
Vuelta a España	
