= Aleksandr Vasiukhno =

Russian cyclist

Cycling career
- Sport: Cycling
- Discipline: Track cycling

Aleksandr Vasiukhno is a Russian male track cyclist, representing Russia at international competitions. He competed at the 2016 UEC European Track Championships in the 1 km time trial event.
