= Reto Müller (cyclist) =

Swiss cyclist

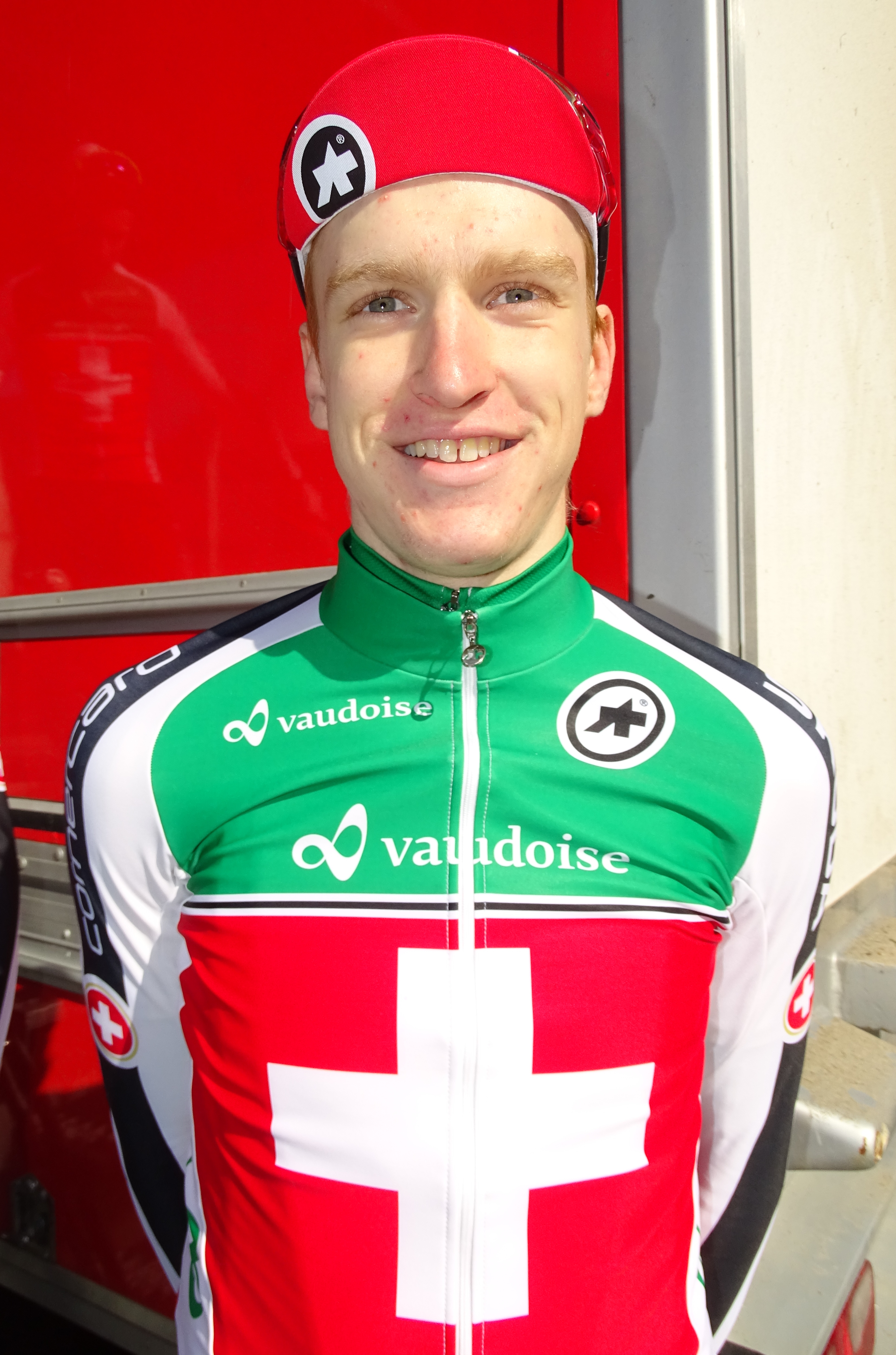
- Müller in 2016

Personal information
- Full name: Reto Müller
- Born: 5 February 1998 (age 28) Schaffhausen, Switzerland

Cycling career
- Sport: Cycling
- Disciplines: Track; Road
- Role: Rider

Amateur teams
- 2017: BMC Development Team
- 2018–2019: Chambéry CF

Professional team
- 2019–2021: Swiss Racing Academy

Reto Müller (born 5 February 1998) is a Swiss cyclist, who last rode for UCI Continental team Swiss Racing Academy. His older brother Patrick Müller also competed professionally as a cyclist.

== Major results ==
=== Road ===
2015
3rd Road race, National Junior Championships
4th Road race, UCI World Junior Championships
2016
1st Overall Grand Prix Rüebliland
3rd Road race, UCI World Junior Championships
7th Road race, UEC European Junior Championships
10th Trofeo Emilio Paganessi
2017
3rd Time trial, National Under-23 Championships

=== Track ===
2013
1st Team sprint, National Championships
2014
1st Team sprint, National Championships
2015
1st Team sprint, National Championships
2nd Team pursuit, UCI World Junior Championships
2016
1st Madison (with Marc Hirschi), UCI World Junior Championships
National Championships

1st Madison (with Marc Hirschi)
1st Team sprint

2017
1st Team pursuit, National Championships
