= Katharina Hechler =

German cyclist

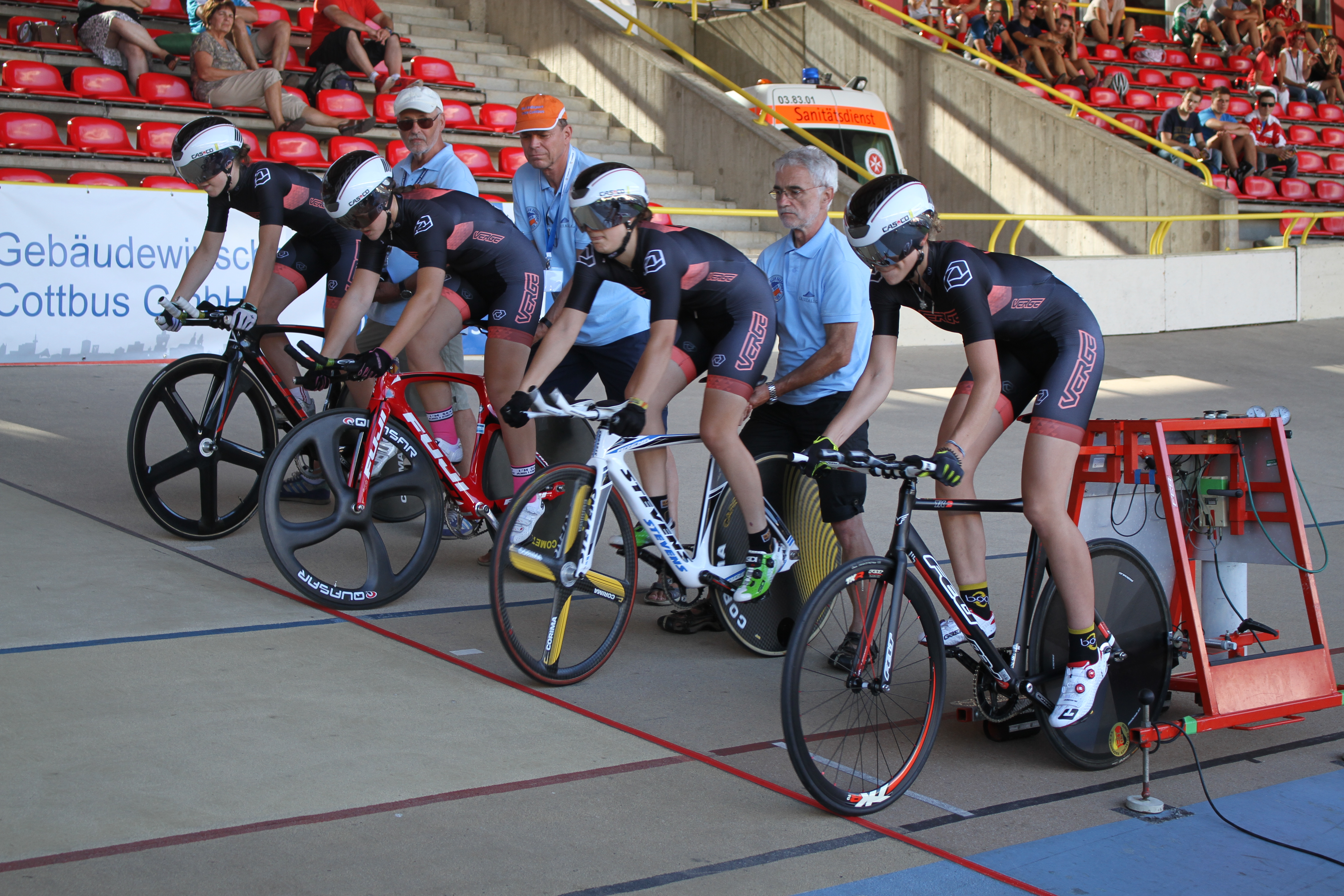
- Hechler (right) in 2016

Personal information
- Born: 10 March 2000 (age 26)

Cycling career
- Sport: Cycling
- Disciplines: Road; Track
- Role: Rider

Amateur teams
- 2009–2019: RSV Edelweiß Oberhausen
- 2016–2018: Marcello/Verge LV Baden
- 2019: Team Stuttgart

Professional team
- 2020: Cogeas–Mettler–Look

Katharina Hechler (born 10 March 2000) is a German professional racing cyclist, who most recently rode for UCI Women's Continental Team Cogeas–Mettler–Look. In August 2020, she rode in the 2020 Strade Bianche Women's race in Italy.
