= Gloria Scarsi =

Italian cyclist

Personal information
- Born: 30 September 2000 (age 26)

Cycling career
- Sport: Cycling
- Discipline: Mountainbike
- Role: Rider

Professional team
- 2019: Bepink

Gloria Scarsi (born 30 September 2000) is an Italian professional racing cyclist, who last rode for the UCI Women's Team Bepink during the 2019 women's road cycling season.. Gloria has since switched to Enduro and now she races World Cup downhill.
