= 2019 UCI Track Cycling World Championships – Men's scratch =

Men's scratch at the 2019 UCI Track Cycling World Championships
- Venue: BGŻ Arena
- Location: Pruszków, Poland
- Dates: 28 February
- Competitors: 24 from 24 nations

Medalists
gold medal	Sam Welsford	Australia
silver medal	Roy Eefting	Netherlands
bronze medal	Thomas Sexton	New Zealand

The Men's scratch competition at the 2019 UCI Track Cycling World Championships was held on 28 February 2019.

== Results ==
The race was started at 19:53. First rider across the line without a net lap loss won.

Rank	Name	Nation	Laps down
1st place, gold medalist(s)	Sam Welsford	Australia	
2nd place, silver medalist(s)	Roy Eefting	Netherlands	
3rd place, bronze medalist(s)	Thomas Sexton	New Zealand	
4	Christos Volikakis	Greece	
5	Rui Oliveira	Portugal	
6	Matthew Walls	Great Britain	
7	Mauro Schmid	Switzerland	
8	Guo Liang	China	
9	Adrian Tekliński	Poland	
10	Michele Scartezzini	Italy	
11	Moreno De Pauw	Belgium	
12	Roman Gladysh	Ukraine	
13	Adrien Garel	France	
14	Adrian Hegyvary	United States	
15	Robert Gaineyev	Kazakhstan	
16	Maxim Piskunov	Russia	
17	Patompob Phonarjthan	Thailand	
18	Felix English	Ireland	
19	Yacine Chalel	Algeria	
20	Stefan Matzner	Austria	
21	Yauheni Karaliok	Belarus	
22	Krisztián Lovassy	Hungary	
—	Leung Ka Yu	Hong Kong	Did not finish
—	Nicolas Pietrula	Czech Republic	Did not finish
