= 2021 UCI Track Cycling World Championships – Men's scratch =

Men's scratch at the 2021 UCI Track Cycling World Championships
- Venue: Vélodrome Couvert Régional Jean Stablinski
- Location: Roubaix, France
- Dates: 21 October
- Competitors: 22 from 22 nations

Medalists
gold medal	Donavan Grondin	France
silver medal	Tuur Dens	Belgium
bronze medal	Rhys Britton	Great Britain

The Men's scratch competition at the 2021 UCI Track Cycling World Championships was held on 21 October 2021.

== Results ==
The race was started at 19:48. First rider across the line without a net lap loss won.

Rank	Name	Nation	Laps down
1st place, gold medalist(s)	Donavan Grondin	France	
2nd place, silver medalist(s)	Tuur Dens	Belgium	
3rd place, bronze medalist(s)	Rhys Britton	Great Britain	
4	Roy Eefting	Netherlands	
5	Kazushige Kuboki	Japan	
6	Daniel Babor	Czech Republic	
7	Tim Teutenberg	Germany	
8	Tobias Hansen	Denmark	
9	Elia Viviani	Italy	
10	Rui Oliveira	Portugal	
11	Sebastián Mora	Spain	
12	Robin Froidevaux	Switzerland	
13	Sergei Rostovtsev	Russian Cycling Federation	
14	Yauheni Karaliok	Belarus	
15	Roman Gladysh	Ukraine	
16	Bartosz Rudyk	Poland	
17	Krisztián Lovassy	Hungary	
18	Maximilian Schmidbauer	Austria	
19	Gavin Hoover	United States	
20	Yacine Chalel	Algeria	−1
21	Akil Campbell	Trinidad and Tobago	−1
22	Martin Chren	Slovakia	−1
