= 2018 UEC European Track Championships – Men's scratch =

Men's scratch at the 2018 UEC European Track Championships
- Venue: Sir Chris Hoy Velodrome, Glasgow
- Date: 3 August
- Competitors: 22 from 22 nations

Medalists
gold medal	Roman Gladysh	Ukraine
silver medal	Adrien Garel	France
bronze medal	Tristan Marguet	Switzerland

The men's scratch competition at the 2018 UEC European Track Championships was held on 3 August 2018.

== Results ==
First rider across the line without a net lap loss wins.

Rank	Name	Nation	Laps down
1st place, gold medalist(s)	Roman Gladysh	Ukraine	
2nd place, silver medalist(s)	Adrien Garel	France	
3rd place, bronze medalist(s)	Tristan Marguet	Switzerland	
4	Elia Viviani	Italy	
5	Christos Volikakis	Greece	
6	Roy Eefting	Netherlands	
7	Matthew Walls	Great Britain	
8	Felix English	Ireland	
9	Daniel Staniszewski	Poland	
10	Lindsay De Vylder	Belgium	
11	Maxim Piskunov	Russia	
12	Daniel Babor	Czech Republic	
13	Andreas Graf	Austria	
14	Yauheni Karaliok	Belarus	
15	Ivo Oliveira	Portugal	
16	Leon Rohde	Germany	
17	Sebastián Mora	Spain	
18	Krisztián Lovassy	Hungary	
19	Edgar Stepanyan	Armenia	
	Filip Taragel	Slovakia	DNF
	Lars Pria	Romania	DNF
	Vitālijs Korņilovs	Latvia	DNF
