= 2022 UEC European Track Championships – Men's scratch =

European Track Championships

Men's scratch at the 2022 UEC European Track Championships
- Venue: Messe München, Munich
- Date: 13 August

Medalists
gold medal	Iúri Leitão	Portugal
silver medal	Moritz Malcharek	Germany
bronze medal	Roy Eefting	Netherlands

The men's scratch competition at the 2022 UEC European Track Championships was held on 13 August 2022.

== Results ==
First rider across the line without a net lap loss wins.

Rank	Name	Nation	Laps down
1st place, gold medalist(s)	Iúri Leitão	Portugal	
2nd place, silver medalist(s)	Moritz Malcharek	Germany	–2
3rd place, bronze medalist(s)	Roy Eefting	Netherlands	–2
4	Mattia Pinazzi	Italy	–2
5	Jules Hesters	Belgium	–2
6	Donavan Grondin	France	–2
7	Rotem Tene	Israel	–2
8	Tim Wafler	Austria	–2
9	Rasmus Pedersen	Denmark	–2
10	Dominik Bieler	Switzerland	–2
11	Albert Torres	Spain	–2
12	Rhys Britton	Great Britain	–2
13	Daniel Crista	Romania	–2
14	Roman Gladysh	Ukraine	–2
15	Bartosz Rudyk	Poland	–2
16	Daniel Babor	Czech Republic	–2
17	Martin Chren	Slovakia	–3
	Galin Dimitrov	Bulgaria	DNF
	Gergő Orosz	Hungary	DNF
	Vitālijs Korņilovs	Latvia	DNF
