= 2022 UEC European Track Championships – Men's omnium =

Cycling competition

Men's omnium at the 2022 UEC European Track Championships
- Venue: Messe München, Munich
- Date: 15 August
- Competitors: 21 from 21 nations
- Winning points: 150

Medalists
| gold medal | Donavan Grondin | France |
| silver medal | Simone Consonni | Italy |
| bronze medal | Sebastian Mora | Spain |

The men's omnium competition at the 2022 UEC European Track Championships was held on 15 August 2022.

== Results ==
=== Qualifying ===
The top 8 riders in each heat qualified for the final.

Heat 1

| Rank | Name | Nation | Sprint points | Lap points | Finish order | Total points | Notes |
|---|---|---|---|---|---|---|---|
| 1 | Fabio Van den Bossche | Belgium | 11 | 0 | 2 | 11 | Q |
| 2 | Simone Consonni | Italy | 7 | 0 | 5 | 7 | Q |
| 3 | Moritz Malcharek | Germany | 7 | 0 | 6 | 7 | Q |
| 4 | Sebastian Mora | Spain | 6 | 0 | 7 | 6 | Q |
| 5 | Simon Vitzthum | Switzerland | 6 | 0 | 9 | 6 | Q |
| 6 | Donavan Grondin | France | 4 | 0 | 8 | 4 | Q |
| 7 | Daniel Dias | Portugal | 3 | 0 | 10 | 3 | Q |
| 8 | Tim Wafler | Austria | 22 | –20 | 1 | 2 | Q |
| 9 | Denis Rugovac | Czech Republic | 14 | –20 | 4 | –6 | |
| 10 | Mykyta Yakovlev | Ukraine | 8 | –20 | 3 | –12 | |
| 11 | Bertold Drijver | Hungary | 0 | –20 | 11 | –20 | |

Heat 2

| Rank | Name | Nation | Sprint points | Lap points | Finish order | Total points | Notes |
|---|---|---|---|---|---|---|---|
| 1 | Daniel Crista | Romania | 18 | 0 | 1 | 18 | Q |
| 2 | Oliver Wood | Great Britain | 11 | 0 | 8 | 11 | Q |
| 3 | Gustav Johansson | Sweden | 10 | 0 | 6 | 10 | Q |
| 4 | Philip Heijnen | Netherlands | 10 | 0 | 10 | 10 | Q |
| 5 | Alon Yogev | Israel | 9 | 0 | 2 | 9 | Q |
| 6 | Daniel Staniszewski | Poland | 5 | 0 | 7 | 5 | Q |
| 7 | Tobias Hansen | Denmark | 1 | 0 | 9 | 1 | Q |
| 8 | Stepan Grigoryan | Armenia | 16 | –20 | 4 | –4 | Q |
| 9 | Galin Dimitrov | Bulgaria | 4 | –100 | 3 | –96 | |
| 10 | Pavol Rovder | Slovakia | 4 | –100 | 5 | –96 | |

=== Scratch race ===
| Rank | Name | Nation | Laps down | Event points |
|---|---|---|---|---|
| 1 | Fabio Van den Bossche | Belgium | | 40 |
| 2 | Daniel Staniszewski | Poland | | 38 |
| 3 | Simon Vitzthum | Switzerland | | 36 |
| 4 | Sebastian Mora | Spain | | 34 |
| 5 | Philip Heijnen | Netherlands | | 32 |
| 6 | Donavan Grondin | France | –1 | 30 |
| 7 | Simone Consonni | Italy | –1 | 28 |
| 8 | Tobias Hansen | Denmark | –1 | 26 |
| 9 | Oliver Wood | Great Britain | –1 | 24 |
| 10 | Daniel Dias | Portugal | –1 | 22 |
| 11 | Moritz Malcharek | Germany | –1 | 20 |
| 12 | Tim Wafler | Austria | –1 | 18 |
| 13 | Gustav Johansson | Sweden | –1 | 16 |
| 14 | Daniel Crista | Romania | –1 | 14 |
| 15 | Alon Yogev | Israel | –1 | 12 |
| 16 | Stepan Grigoryan | Armenia | –2 | 10 |

=== Tempo race ===
| Rank | Name | Nation | Points in race | Event points |
|---|---|---|---|---|
| 1 | Simone Consonni | Italy | 26 | 40 |
| 2 | Sebastian Mora | Spain | 24 | 38 |
| 3 | Fabio Van den Bossche | Belgium | 22 | 36 |
| 4 | Tim Wafler | Austria | 22 | 34 |
| 5 | Daniel Staniszewski | Poland | 22 | 32 |
| 6 | Oliver Wood | Great Britain | 21 | 30 |
| 7 | Tobias Hansen | Denmark | 12 | 28 |
| 8 | Philip Heijnen | Netherlands | 4 | 26 |
| 9 | Donavan Grondin | France | 3 | 24 |
| 10 | Simon Vitzthum | Switzerland | 2 | 22 |
| 11 | Moritz Malcharek | Germany | 0 | 20 |
| 12 | Daniel Dias | Portugal | 0 | 18 |
| 13 | Gustav Johansson | Sweden | 0 | 16 |
| 14 | Daniel Crista | Romania | 0 | 14 |
| 15 | Alon Yogev | Israel | –20 | 12 |
| 16 | Stepan Grigoryan | Armenia | –32 | 10 |

=== Elimination race ===
| Rank | Name | Nation | Event Points |
|---|---|---|---|
| 1 | Donavan Grondin | France | 40 |
| 2 | Oliver Wood | Great Britain | 38 |
| 3 | Sebastian Mora | Spain | 36 |
| 4 | Simone Consonni | Italy | 34 |
| 5 | Simon Vitzthum | Switzerland | 32 |
| 6 | Philip Heijnen | Netherlands | 30 |
| 7 | Moritz Malcharek | Germany | 28 |
| 8 | Daniel Staniszewski | Poland | 26 |
| 9 | Fabio Van den Bossche | Belgium | 24 |
| 10 | Tobias Hansen | Denmark | 22 |
| 11 | Tim Wafler | Austria | 20 |
| 12 | Daniel Dias | Portugal | 18 |
| 13 | Daniel Crista | Romania | 16 |
| 14 | Gustav Johansson | Sweden | 14 |
| 15 | Stepan Grigoryan | Armenia | 12 |
| 16 | Alon Yogev | Israel | 10 |

=== Points race ===
| Overall rank | Name | Nation | Scratch race | Tempo race | Elim. race | Subtotal | Lap points | Sprint points | Finish order | Total points |
|---|---|---|---|---|---|---|---|---|---|---|
| 1st place, gold medalist(s) | Donavan Grondin | France | 30 | 24 | 40 | 94 | 20 | 36 | 2 | 150 |
| 2nd place, silver medalist(s) | Simone Consonni | Italy | 28 | 40 | 34 | 102 | 20 | 26 | 3 | 148 |
| 3rd place, bronze medalist(s) | Sebastian Mora | Spain | 34 | 38 | 36 | 108 | 20 | 18 | 4 | 146 |
| 4 | Philip Heijnen | Netherlands | 32 | 26 | 30 | 88 | 20 | 25 | 1 | 133 |
| 5 | Daniel Staniszewski | Poland | 38 | 32 | 26 | 96 | 20 | 12 | 5 | 128 |
| 6 | Fabio Van den Bossche | Belgium | 40 | 36 | 24 | 100 | 20 | 5 | 14 | 125 |
| 7 | Simon Vitzthum | Switzerland | 36 | 22 | 32 | 90 | 0 | 3 | 6 | 93 |
| 8 | Oliver Wood | Great Britain | 24 | 30 | 38 | 92 | 0 | 0 | 10 | 92 |
| 9 | Moritz Malcharek | Germany | 20 | 20 | 28 | 68 | 20 | 3 | 12 | 91 |
| 10 | Tobias Hansen | Denmark | 26 | 28 | 22 | 76 | 0 | 12 | 8 | 88 |
| 11 | Tim Wafler | Austria | 18 | 34 | 20 | 72 | 0 | 2 | 13 | 74 |
| 12 | Daniel Dias | Portugal | 22 | 18 | 18 | 58 | 0 | 0 | 9 | 58 |
| 13 | Gustav Johansson | Sweden | 16 | 16 | 14 | 46 | 0 | 0 | 15 | 46 |
| 14 | Daniel Crista | Romania | 14 | 14 | 16 | 44 | 0 | 1 | 7 | 45 |
| 15 | Alon Yogev | Israel | 12 | 12 | 10 | 34 | 0 | 0 | 11 | 34 |
| 16 | Stepan Grigoryan | Armenia | 10 | 10 | 12 | 32 | –60 | 0 | 16 | –28 |
