= 2024 UEC European Track Championships – Men's scratch =

Men's scratch at the 2024 UEC European Track Championships
- Venue: Omnisport Apeldoorn, Apeldoorn
- Date: 12 January
- Competitors: 20 from 20 nations

Medalists
gold medal	Iúri Leitão	Portugal
silver medal	Tim Wafler	Austria
bronze medal	Tobias Hansen	Denmark

The men's scratch competition at the 2024 UEC European Track Championships was held on 12 January 2024.

== Results ==
First rider across the line without a net lap loss wins.

Rank	Name	Nation	Laps down
1st place, gold medalist(s)	Iúri Leitão	Portugal	
2nd place, silver medalist(s)	Tim Wafler	Austria	
3rd place, bronze medalist(s)	Tobias Hansen	Denmark	
4	Ethan Vernon	Great Britain	
5	Sebastián Mora	Spain	
6	Jan Voneš	Czech Republic	
7	Tuur Dens	Belgium	
8	Oscar Nilsson-Julien	France	
9	Valère Thiébaud	Switzerland	
10	Bartosz Rudyk	Poland	
11	Vladyslav Loginov	Israel	–1
12	Benjamin Boos	Germany	–1
13	George Nemilostivijs	Latvia	–1
14	Roman Gladysh	Ukraine	–1
15	Matteo Florin	Italy	–1
16	Martin Chren	Slovakia	–1
17	Gustav Johansson	Sweden	–1
18	Daniel Crista	Romania	–1
19	Roy Eefting	Netherlands	–1
	Georgios Boutopoulos	Greece	DNF
