= 2023 UEC European Track Championships – Men's madison =

Men's madison at the 2023 UEC European Track Championships
- Venue: Tissot Velodrome, Grenchen
- Date: 12 February
- Competitors: 32 from 16 nations
- Teams: 16
- Winning points: 43

Medalists
gold medal	Roger Kluge; Theo Reinhardt	Germany
silver medal	Simone Consonni; Michele Scartezzini	Italy
bronze medal	Donavan Grondin; Benjamin Thomas	France

The men's madison competition at the 2023 UEC European Track Championships was held on 12 February 2023.

== Results ==
200 laps (50 km) with 20 sprints were raced.

Rank	Name	Nation	Lap points	Sprint points	Finish order	Total points
1st place, gold medalist(s)	Roger Kluge; Theo Reinhardt	Germany	0	43	1	43
2nd place, silver medalist(s)	Simone Consonni; Michele Scartezzini	Italy	0	34	5	34
3rd place, bronze medalist(s)	Donavan Grondin; Benjamin Thomas	France	0	32	4	32
4	Rui Oliveira; Iúri Leitão	Portugal	0	31	2	31
5	Robbe Ghys; Fabio Van den Bossche	Belgium	0	15	8	15
6	Sebastian Mora; Albert Torres	Spain	0	13	3	13
7	Oliver Wood; Fred Wright	Great Britain	–20	26	6	6
8	Tobias Hansen; Theodor Storm	Denmark	0	6	11	6
9	Yoeri Havik; Vincent Hoppezak	Netherlands	–20	22	7	2
10	Raphael Kokas; Felix Ritzinger	Austria	–20	0	10	–20
11	Wojciech Pszczolarski; Szymon Sajnok	Poland	–40	9	9	–31
12	Claudio Imhof; Lukas Rüegg	Switzerland	–40	0	–	DNF
12	Valentyn Kabashnyi; Mykyta Yakovlev	Ukraine	–40	0	–	DNF
14	Jan Voneš; Radovan Štec	Czech Republic	–40	0	–	DNF
15	Vladislav Logionov; Rotem Tene	Israel	–40	0	–	DNF
16	Martin Chren; Pavol Rovder	Slovakia	–40	0	–	DNF
