= Israel at the 2022 European Championships =

in (Germany) Munich 11 August 2022 – 21 August 2022
- Competitors: 78 (48 men and 30 women) in 9 sports
- Medals Ranked 22nd: Gold 2 Silver 1 Bronze 3 Total 6

European Championships appearances
- 2018; 2022

Israel competed at the 2022 European Championships in Munich from August 11 to August 21, 2022.

== Medallists ==
Medal	Name	Sport	Event	Date
Gold	Girmaw Amare; Gashau Ayale; Yimer Getahun; Bukayawe Malede; Omer Ramon; Maru Teferi	Athletics	Men's marathon team	15 August
Gold	Artem Dolgopyat	Artistic Gymnastics	Men's floor	21 August
Silver	Maru Teferi	Athletics	Men's marathon	15 August
Bronze	Gashau Ayale	Athletics	Men's marathon	15 August
Bronze	Lonah Chemtai Salpeter	Athletics	Women's 10,000 metres	15 August
Bronze	Hanna Minenko	Athletics	Women's triple jump	19 August

== Competitors ==
The following is the list of number of competitors in the Championships:

Sport		Men	Women	Total
Athletics		9	6	15
Beach Volleyball		2	0	2
Canoeing and Paracanoeing		8	6	14
Cycling	Mountain biking	1	2	3
Cycling	Road cycling	2	2	4
Cycling	Track cycling	3	0	3
Gymnastics (men and women)		5	5	10
Rowing and Para-rowing		2	1	3
Sport climbing		6	4	10
Table Tennis		2	0	2
Triathlon		4	2	6
Total		44	28	72

== Athletics ==
Israel entered the following athletes.

Key

- Q = Qualified for the next round
- q = Qualified for the next round as a fastest loser or, in field events, by position without achieving the qualifying target
- NR = National record
- PB = Personal best
- SB = Season best
- N/A = Round not applicable for the event

=== Men ===
Track and road events

Athlete	Event	Heat		Semifinal		Final	
Athlete	Event	Result	Rank	Result	Rank	Result	Rank
Blessing Afrifah	200 metres	Bye		20.34	5 q	20.69	7
Tadesse Getahon	10,000 metres	—N/a				28:04.37 PB	10
Girmaw Amare	Marathon	—N/a				2:11:32	9
Gashau Ayale	Marathon	—N/a				2:10:29 SB	3rd place, bronze medalist(s)
Yimer Getahun	Marathon	—N/a				2:10:56 SB	7
Bukayawe Malede	Marathon	—N/a				DNF	
Omer Ramon	Marathon	—N/a				2:16:35	26
Marhu Teferi	Marathon	—N/a				2:10:23	2nd place, silver medalist(s)
Girmaw Amare; Gashau Ayale; Yimer Getahun; Bukayawe Malede; Omer Ramon; Maru Teferi	Marathon Cup	—N/a				6:31:48	1st place, gold medalist(s)

Field events

Athlete	Event	Qualification		Final	
Athlete	Event	Distance	Position	Distance	Position
Yonathan Kapitolnik	High jump	2.17	8	did not advance	

=== Women ===
Track and road events

Athlete	Event	Heat		Semifinal		Final	
Athlete	Event	Result	Rank	Result	Rank	Result	Rank
Diana Vaisman	100 metres	Bye		11.36	9	did not advance	
Selamawit Teferi	5000 metres	—N/a				15:14.36 SB	8
Selamawit Teferi	10,000 metres	—N/a				31:24.03	5
Lonah Chemtai Salpeter	10,000 metres	—N/a				30:46.37 NR	3rd place, bronze medalist(s)
Maor Tiyouri	Marathon	—N/a				2:38:04	28
Adva Cohen	3000 metres steeplechase	9:39.99	6 Q	—N/a		9:36.84	8

Field events

Athlete	Event	Qualification		Final	
Athlete	Event	Distance	Position	Distance	Position
Hanna Knyazyeva-Minenko	Triple jump	14.06	6 q	14.45	3rd place, bronze medalist(s)

== Beach Volleyball ==
Israel has qualified 1 male pair.

Athlete	Event	Preliminary round			Round of 24	Round of 16	Quarterfinals	Semifinals	Final / BM	
Athlete	Event	Opposition Score	Opposition Score	Rank	Opposition Score	Opposition Score	Opposition Score	Opposition Score	Opposition Score	Rank
Eylon Elazar; Netanel Ohana	Men's	Mol A. – Sørum (NOR); L 0–2 (19–21, 17–21)	Berntsen – Mol H. (NOR); L 0–2 (12–21, 18–21)	4	did not advance					25

== Canoeing and Paracanoeing ==
Men

Athlete	Event	Heats		Semifinals		Final	
Athlete	Event	Time	Rank	Time	Rank	Time	Rank
Stav Mizrahi	K-1 200 m	37.335	8 BT	36.376	5	Did not advance	11
Ilya Podpolnny	K-1 500 m	1:48.194	6 SF	1:46.594	7 FB	1:42.587	8 (overall: 17)
Ilya Podpolnny	K-1 1000 m	3:42.170	3 SF	3:42.748	8 BT	3:45.089	9 (overall: 18)
Ilya Podpolnny	K-1 5000 m					DNS	
Yahav Golan; Stav Mizrahi	K-2 500 m	1:46.908	8	did not advance			23
Shalev Drey; Ben Port Korzak	K-2 1000 m	3:38.002	7 SF	3:29.008	6	Did not advance	12
Shalev Drey; Yahav Golan; Amit Gorfinkel; Ben Port Korzak	K-4 500 m	1:34.595	9	did not advance			17
Adi Ezra	KL2 200 m	50.362	5 SF	49.133	3 F	49.214	9
Ron Halevi	KL3 200 m					44.608	7

Qualification Legend: F or FA=Final A (medal); FB=Final B (non-medal); SF= Semifinal; BT=Qualified by Time

Women

Athlete	Event	Heats		Semifinals		Final	
Athlete	Event	Time	Rank	Time	Rank	Time	Rank
Netta Malkinson	K-1 200 m	46.618	8 BT	46.218	9	Did not advance	15
Netta Malkinson	K-1 500 m	2:18.787	8	did not advance			24
Darya Budouskaya; Mia Meizeles	K-2 200 m					45.776	8
Darya Budouskaya; Mia Meizeles	K-2 500 m	2:06.186	7 SF	2:00.701	9	Did not advance	20
Darya Budouskaya	K-1 5000 m					KO	13
Pascale Bercovitch	KL2 200 m					1:03.378	9
Talia Eilat	KL2 200 m					56.463	6
Irina Shafir	VL2 200 m					1:20.885	4
Talia Eilat	VL3 200 m					1:07.976	5

Qualification Legend: F or FA=Final A (medal); FB=Final B (non-medal); SF= Semifinal; BT=Qualified by Time; KO=Last Place Knock Out

== Cycling ==
=== Track ===
Elimination race

Athlete	Event	Final
Rotem Tene	Men's elimination race	15

Madison

Athlete	Event	Final	
Athlete	Event	Points	Rank
Vladislav Logionov; Rotem Tene	Men's madison	DNF	

Omnium

Athlete	Event	Qualification		Scratch Race		Tempo Race		Elimination Race		Points Race		Total points	Rank
Athlete	Event	Rank	Points	Rank	Points	Rank	Points	Rank	Points	Rank	Points	Total points	Rank
Alon Yogev	Men's omnium	5 Q	9	15	12	15	12	16	10	14	0	34	15

Points race

Athlete	Event	Final	
Athlete	Event	Points	Rank
Vladislav Logionov	Men's points race	–15	13

Pursuit

Athlete	Event	Qualification		Final	
Athlete	Event	Time	Rank	Opponent Results	Rank
Vladislav Logionov	Men's individual pursuit	4:37.148	20	did not advance	
Alon Yogev	Men's individual pursuit	4:33.033	19	did not advance	

Scratch

Athlete	Event	Final	
Athlete	Event	Laps down	Rank
Rotem Tene	Men's scratch	–2	7

=== Mountain biking ===
Athlete	Event	Time	Time Behind	Rank
Tomer Zaltsman	Men's cross-country	1:23:11	+0:05:02	41
Naama Noyman	Women's cross-country	-3LAP		40
Lianne Witkin	Women's cross-country	-4LAP		44

=== Road ===
Men

Athlete	Event	Time	Time Behind	Rank
Yuval Ben Moshe	Road race	4:39:35	+0:00:46	76
Itamar Einhorn	Road race	4:38:49	+0:00:00	13

Women

Athlete	Event	Time	Time Behind	Rank
Rotem Gafinovitz	Road race	2:59:30	+0:00:10	28
Omer Shapira	Road race	2:59:30	+0:00:10	27
Rotem Gafinovitz	Time trial	33:35.56	+2:36.00	18
Omer Shapira	Time trial	33:44.34	+2:45.00	20

== Gymnastics ==
Israel has entered five senior male, five senior female, five Junior male, and four Junior female athletes.

=== Men ===
Team & Individual All-Round Finals

Athlete	Event	Qualification								Final							
Athlete	Event	Apparatus						Total	Rank	Apparatus						Total	Rank
Athlete	Event	F	PH	R	V	PB	HB	Total	Rank	F	PH	R	V	PB	HB	Total	Rank
Artem Dolgopyat	Team senior	14.266	~~11.933~~	~~DNS~~	14.433	13.833	12.833	DNF									
Pavel Gulidov	Team senior	12.466	12.633	13.566	14.200	13.166											
Ron Pyatov	Team senior			12.800		~~10.966~~	~~11.000~~										
Alexander Myakinin	Team senior		13.233				13.400										
Uri Zeidel	Team senior	13.766	13.233	13.000	12.500	12.733	12.033	77.265	39								
Total	Team senior	40.498	39.099	39.366	41.133	39.732	38.266	238.094	16	did not advance							
Dmytro Dotsenko	Team Junior									11.566	12.933	12.966	13.033	13.500	13.200	77.198	15
Eliran Ioscovich	Team Junior									~~11.066~~	12.733	12.266	13.533	10.733	12.766	73.097	49
Ron Ortal	Team Junior									11.633	~~10.500~~	~~11.600~~	~~12.100~~	12.166	~~11.966~~	69.965	63
Ron Snir	Team Junior									12.400	10.866	12.133	12.800	~~10.200~~	12.066	70.465	61
Total	Team Junior									35.599	36.532	37.365	39.366	36.399	38.032	223.293	18

Individual Apparatus

Athlete	Apparatus	Qualification		Final	
Athlete	Apparatus	Total	Rank	Total	Rank
Artem Dolgopyat	Floor senior	14.266	6 Q	14.966	1st place, gold medalist(s)
Dmytro Dotsenko	Parallel bars junior	13.500	2 Q	13.366	4
Dmytro Dotsenko	Horizontal bar junior	13.200	3 Q	13.366	1st place, gold medalist(s)

=== Women ===
Team & Individual All-Round Finals

Athlete	Event	Qualification						Final					
Athlete	Event	Apparatus				Total	Rank	Apparatus				Total	Rank
Athlete	Event	V	UB	BB	F	Total	Rank	V	UB	BB	F	Total	Rank
Geffen Dor	Team senior		~~8.966~~	10.433	11.433								
Ofir Netzer	Team senior	13.166	12.433	~~9.233~~	~~11.166~~	45.998	56						
Lihie Raz	Team senior	13.500 Q	12.333	11.733	12.600	50.166	19						
Noga Shalit	Team senior	~~12.266~~		10.466	11.500								
Andy Turiski	Team senior	12.500	10.933										
Total	Team senior	39.166	35.699	32.632	35.533	143.030	16	did not advance					
Liran Barak	Team Junior							~~11.766~~	~~7.000~~	~~8.433~~	~~10.233~~	37.432	76
Almog Leizerovich	Team Junior							12.033	10.133	9.433	11.266	42.865	55
Yali Shoshani	Team Junior							11.866	11.233	10.833	11.966	45.898	32
Nitzan Steinberg	Team Junior							11.933	9.600	10.166	10.566	42.265	60
Total	Team Junior							35.832	30.966	30.432	33.798	131.028	16

Individual Apparatus

Athlete	Apparatus	Qualification		Final	
Athlete	Apparatus	Total	Rank	Total	Rank
Lihie Raz	Vault senior	13.266	8 Q	13.016	7

== Rowing and Para-rowing ==
Men

Athlete	Event	Heats		Repechage		Semifinals		Final	
Athlete	Event	Time	Rank	Time	Rank	Time	Rank	Time	Rank
Dani Fridman	Single sculls	8:38.13	5 R	9:23.62	6S SC/D	withdrew			
Shmuel Daniel	PR1 single sculls	11:22.39	2 R	11:16.01	2 FA			10:35.22	4

Qualification Legend: FA=Final A (medal); FB/FC/FD=Final B/C/D (non-medal); SA/B= Semifinal A/B; SC/D= Semifinal C/D; R =Repechage

Women

Athlete	Event	Heats		Repechage		Semifinals		Final	
Athlete	Event	Time	Rank	Time	Rank	Time	Rank	Time	Rank
Moran Samuel	PR1 single sculls	12:36.04	4 FA					11:28.13	4

Qualification Legend: FA=Final A (medal)

== Sport climbing ==
=== Boulder ===
Athlete	Event	Qualification		Semifinal		Final	
Athlete	Event	Result	Rank	Result	Rank	Result	Rank
Yotam Ben Reuven	Men's	1T2z 3 9	33	did not advance			
Alex Khazanov	Men's	2T3z 8 9	39	did not advance			
Geva Levin	Men's	2T4z 7 11	29	did not advance			
Ram Levin	Men's	1T2z 6 4	47	did not advance			
Nimrod Marcus	Men's	2T5z 7 10	21	did not advance			
Maya Dreamer	Women's	1T2z 1 3	45	did not advance			
Ayala Kerem	Women's	3T4z 12 11	9 Q	2T3z 4 4	7	did not advance	
Noa Shiran	Women's	1T3z 1 4	31	did not advance			
Yael Taub	Women's	0T3z 0 10	37	did not advance			

=== Lead ===
Athlete	Event	Qualification								Semifinal			Final		
Athlete	Event	Hold	Time	Rank	Hold	Time	Rank	Points	Rank	Hold	Time	Rank	Hold	Time	Rank
Yotam Ben Reuven	Men's	17+	2:18	42	19+	2:34	=45	44.43	46	did not advance					
Alex Khazanov	Men's	DNS								did not advance					
Ram Levin	Men's	DNS								did not advance					
Nimrod Marcus	Men's	24+	2:55	=30	42+	5:46	=13	21.54	22 Q	34+	4:16	16	did not advance		
Yuval Shemla	Men's	37+	3:30	=14	38+	3:48	=28	20.86	21 Q	34	4:08	19	did not advance		
Noa Shiran	Women's	42	5:30	12	24+	1:54	=15	15.10	15 Q	18+	2:06	19	did not advance		

=== Combined ===
Athlete	Event	Qualification		Final						
Athlete	Event	Total	Rank	Boulder		Lead			Total	Rank
Athlete	Event	Total	Rank	Result	Place	Hold	Time	Place	Total	Rank
Yotam Ben Reuven	Men's	41.50	30	did not advance						
Nimrod Marcus	Men's	357.50	13	did not advance						
Noa Shiran	Women's	205.50	15	did not advance						

== Table Tennis ==
=== Men ===
Athlete	Event	Qualification stage			Preliminary Round 1	Preliminary Round 2	Round of 64	Round of 32	Round of 16	Quarterfinals	Semifinals	Final / BM	
Athlete	Event	Opposition Score	Opposition Score	Rank	Opposition Score	Opposition Score	Opposition Score	Opposition Score	Opposition Score	Opposition Score	Opposition Score	Opposition Score	Rank
Tal Israeli	Singles	Rassenfosse (BEL); L 0–3	Cvetko (SLO); L 2–3	did not advance									81
Michael Tauber	Singles	Movileanu (ROU); L 2–3	Lind (DEN); L 0–3	did not advance									81
Tal Israeli (ISR); Jordy Piccolin (ITA)	Doubles				Bye	Stamatouros / Konstantinopoulos (GRE); W 3–2		Lebrun A. / Lebrun F. (FRA); L 0–3	did not advance				17
Michael Tauber (ISR); Marios Yiangou (CYP)	Doubles				Bye	Kubik / Kulczycki (POL); L 0–3		did not advance					33

=== Mixed ===
Athlete	Event	Preliminary Round 1	Preliminary Round 2	Round of 32	Round of 16	Quarterfinals	Semifinals	Final / BM	
Athlete	Event	Opposition Score	Opposition Score	Opposition Score	Opposition Score	Opposition Score	Opposition Score	Opposition Score	Rank
Michael Tauber (ISR); Margo Degraef (BEL)	Doubles	Caballero / Zhang (ESP); L 1–3	did not advance						49

== Triathlon ==
Athlete	Event	Swim (1.5 km)	Trans 1	Bike (40 km)	Trans 2	Run (10 km)	Total Time	Rank
Itamar Eshed	Men's	18:25	0:34	did not finish				
Shachar Sagiv	Men's	18:25	0:30	0:51:26	0:24	0:32:52	1:43:35	17
Itamar Levanon	Men's	19:32	0:33	0:53:06	0:24	0:33:44	1:47:16	40
Roee Zuaretz	Men's	18:42	0:34	0:57:21	0:28	0:36:21	1:53:23	56
