= 2022 UCI Track Cycling World Championships – Men's madison =

Men's madison at the 2022 UCI Track Cycling World Championships
- Venue: Vélodrome National
- Location: Saint-Quentin-en-Yvelines, France
- Dates: 16 October
- Competitors: 36 from 18 nations
- Teams: 18
- Winning points: 65

Medalists
gold medal	Donovan Grondin; Benjamin Thomas	France
silver medal	Ethan Hayter; Oliver Wood	Great Britain
bronze medal	Fabio Van Den Bossche; Lindsay De Vylder	Belgium

The Men's madison competition at the 2022 UCI Track Cycling World Championships was held on 16 October 2022.

== Results ==
The race was started at 14:30.

Rank	Riders	Nation	Laps points	Sprint points	Total points
1st place, gold medalist(s)	Donavan Grondin; Benjamin Thomas	France	20	45	65
2nd place, silver medalist(s)	Ethan Hayter; Oliver Wood	Great Britain	20	27	47
3rd place, bronze medalist(s)	Fabio Van Den Bossche; Lindsay De Vylder	Belgium	20	23	43
4	Simone Consonni; Michele Scartezzini	Italy	20	21	41
5	Yoeri Havik; Jan Willem van Schip	Netherlands	20	17	37
6	Rui Oliveira; Ivo Oliveira	Portugal	20	7	27
7	Shunsuke Imamura; Kazushige Kuboki	Japan	20	5	25
8	Roger Kluge; Theo Reinhardt	Germany	0	24	24
9	Campbell Stewart; Aaron Gate	New Zealand	0	20	20
10	Kelland O'Brien; Samuel Welsford	Australia	0	16	16
11	Michael Mørkøv; Niklas Larsen	Denmark	0	15	15
12	Lukas Rüegg; Claudio Imhof	Switzerland	0	8	8
13	Dylan Bibic; Mathias Guillemette	Canada	−20	2	−18
–	Bartosz Rudyk; Szymon Sajnok	Poland	Did not finish		
–	Peter Moore; Eddy Huntsman	United States	Did not finish		
–	Denis Rugovac; Daniel Babor	Czech Republic	Did not finish		
–	Facundo Lezica; Ivan Gabriel Ruiz	Argentina	Did not finish		
–	Ricardo Peña; Jorge Peyrot	Mexico	Did not finish		
