= 2020 UEC European Track Championships – Men's scratch =

Men's scratch at the 2020 UEC European Track Championships
- Venue: Kolodruma, Plovdiv
- Date: 12 November
- Competitors: 20 from 20 nations

Medalists
gold medal	Iúri Leitão	Portugal
silver medal	Roman Gladysh	Ukraine
bronze medal	Oliver Wood	Great Britain

The men's scratch competition at the 2020 UEC European Track Championships was held on 12 November 2020.

== Results ==
First rider across the line without a net lap loss wins.

Rank	Name	Nation	Laps down
1st place, gold medalist(s)	Iúri Leitão	Portugal	
2nd place, silver medalist(s)	Roman Gladysh	Ukraine	–1
3rd place, bronze medalist(s)	Oliver Wood	Great Britain	–1
4	Eduard-Michael Grosu	Romania	–1
5	Christos Volikakis	Greece	–1
6	Sergey Rostovtsev	Russia	–1
7	Daniel Staniszewski	Poland	–1
8	Tristan Marguet	Switzerland	–1
9	Yauheni Karaliok	Belarus	–1
10	Sebastián Mora	Spain	–1
11	Matteo Donegà	Italy	–1
12	Krisztián Lovassy	Hungary	–1
13	Andreas Müller	Austria	–1
14	Daniel Babor	Czech Republic	–1
15	Itamar Einhorn	Israel	–1
16	Justas Beniušis	Lithuania	–2
17	Nikolay Genov	Bulgaria	–2
DNF	Štefan Michalička	Slovakia	–2
DNF	Žiga Jerman	Slovenia	–2
DNF	Vitālijs Korņilovs	Latvia	–2
