= 2017 UEC European Track Championships – Men's scratch =

Men's scratch at the 2017 UEC European Track Championships
- UEC European Champion jersey
- Venue: Velodrom, Berlin
- Date: 19 October
- Competitors: 24 from 24 nations

Medalists
gold medal	Adrien Garel	France
silver medal	Krisztián Lovassy	Hungary
bronze medal	Roman Gladysh	Ukraine

The Men's scratch was held on 19 October 2017.

== Results ==
Rank	Name	Nation	Laps down
1st place, gold medalist(s)	Adrien Garel	France	
2nd place, silver medalist(s)	Krisztián Lovassy	Hungary	
3rd place, bronze medalist(s)	Roman Gladysh	Ukraine	
4	Marc Potts	Ireland	
5	Anders Oddli	Norway	
6	Rui Oliveira	Portugal	
7	Maxim Piskunov	Russia	-1
8	Kenny De Ketele	Belgium	-1
9	Christopher Latham	Great Britain	-1
10	Stefan Matzner	Austria	-1
11	Edgar Stepanyan	Armenia	-1
12	Christos Volikakis	Greece	-1
13	Xavier Cañellas	Spain	-1
14	Wim Stroetinga	Netherlands	-1
15	Lucas Liss	Germany	-1
16	Adrian Tekliński	Poland	-1
17	Gaël Suter	Switzerland	-1
18	Filip Taragel	Slovakia	-1
19	Raman Ramanau	Belarus	-1
20	Jonas Ahlstrand	Sweden	-1
21	Vitālijs Korņilovs	Latvia	-2
22	Valentin Plesea	Romania	-2
23	Jiří Hochmann	Czech Republic	-2
	Francesco Lamon	Italy	DNF
