= 2023 UEC European Track Championships – Men's scratch =

Men's scratch at the 2023 UEC European Track Championships
- Venue: Tissot Velodrome, Grenchen
- Date: 10 February
- Competitors: 21

Medalists
gold medal	Oliver Wood	Great Britain
silver medal	Roy Eefting	Netherlands
bronze medal	Donavan Grondin	France

The men's scratch competition at the 2023 UEC European Track Championships was held on 10 February 2023.

== Results ==
First rider across the line without a net lap loss wins.

Rank	Name	Nation	Laps down
1st place, gold medalist(s)	Oliver Wood	Great Britain	
2nd place, silver medalist(s)	Roy Eefting	Netherlands	
3rd place, bronze medalist(s)	Donavan Grondin	France	
4	Tuur Dens	Belgium	
5	Tim Torn Teutenberg	Germany	
6	Iúri Leitão	Portugal	
7	Albert Torres	Spain	
8	Tim Wafler	Austria	
9	Carl-Frederik Bévort	Denmark	
10	Filip Prokopyszyn	Poland	
11	Kyrylo Tsarenko	Ukraine	
12	Alex Vogel	Switzerland	–1
	Radovan Štec	Czech Republic	DNF
	Christos Volikakis	Greece	DNF
	Jack Bernard Murphy	Ireland	DNF
	Vladislav Loginov	Israel	DNF
	Martin Chren	Slovakia	DNF
	Musa Mikayilzade	Azerbaijan	DNF
	George Nemilostivijs	Latvia	DNF
	Žygimantas Matuzevičius	Lithuania	DNF
	Mattia Pinazzi	Italy	DNF
