= 2017 UEC European Track Championships – Men's elimination race =

Men's elimination race at the 2017 UEC European Track Championships
- UEC European Champion jersey
- Venue: Velodrom, Berlin
- Date: 20 October
- Competitors: 20 from 20 nations

Medalists
gold medal	Gerben Thijssen	Belgium
silver medal	Maksim Piskunov	Russia
bronze medal	Rui Oliveira	Portugal

The Men's elimination race was held on 20 October 2017.

== Results ==
Rank	Name	Nation
1st place, gold medalist(s)	Gerben Thijssen	Belgium
2nd place, silver medalist(s)	Maksim Piskunov	Russia
3rd place, bronze medalist(s)	Rui Oliveira	Portugal
4	Loïc Perizzolo	Switzerland
5	Michele Scartezzini	Italy
6	Raman Tsishkou	Belarus
7	Adrien Garel	France
8	Roy Pieters	Netherlands
9	Szymon Krawczyk	Poland
10	Yauheni Akhramenka	Belarus
11	Xavier Cañellas	Spain
12	Stefan Mastaller	Austria
13	Maximilian Beyer	Germany
14	JB Murphy	Ireland
15	Zafeiris Volikakis	Greece
16	Tomáš Person	Slovakia
17	Jonas Ahlstrand	Sweden
18	Kian Emadi	Great Britain
19	Jiří Hochmann	Czech Republic
20	Valentin Plesea	Romania
