= Israel at the 2018 European Championships =

- IOC code: ISR

in (United Kingdom) Glasgow (Germany) Berlin 2 August 2018 – 12 August 2018
- Competitors: 59 in 6 sports
- Medals Ranked 24th: Gold 1 Silver 1 Bronze 0 Total 2

European Championships appearances
- 2018; 2022

Israel competed at the inaugural 7 sports 2018 European Championships from 2 to 12 August 2018. It competed in 6 sports.

== Medallists ==
Medal	Name	Sport	Event	Date
Gold	Lonah Chemtai Salpeter	Athletics	Women's 10,000 metres	8 August
Silver	Artem Dolgopyat	Gymnastics	Men's floor	12 August
