= 2023 Bredene Koksijde Classic =

2023 UCI ProSeries

Race details
- Dates: 17 March 2023
- Stages: 1
- Distance: 191.6 km (119.1 mi)
- Winning time: 4h 17' 44"

Results
	Winner	Gerben Thijssen (BEL)	(Intermarché–Circus–Wanty)
	Second	Pascal Ackermann (GER)	(UAE Team Emirates)
	Third	Sam Welsford (AUS)	(Team DSM)

The 2023 Bredene Koksijde Classic was the 20th edition of the Bredene Koksijde Classic road cycling one day race, which was held on 17 March 2023, starting and finishing in the titular towns of Bredene and Koksijde, respectively.

== Teams ==
Eight UCI WorldTeams, eleven UCI ProTeams, and four UCI Continental teams made up the twenty-three teams that participated in the race.

UCI WorldTeams

- Alpecin–Deceuninck
- Arkéa–Samsic
- Intermarché–Circus–Wanty
- Soudal–Quick-Step
- Team DSM
- Trek–Segafredo
- UAE Team Emirates

UCI ProTeams

- Bingoal WB
- Human Powered Health
- Israel–Premier Tech
- Lotto–Dstny
- Q36.5 Pro Cycling Team
- Team Corratec
- Team Flanders–Baloise
- Team Novo Nordisk
- Team TotalEnergies
- Uno-X Pro Cycling Team

UCI Continental Teams

- TDT–Unibet Cycling Team
- Tarteletto–Isorex
- VolkerWessels Cycling Team

== Result ==
Result
Rank	Rider	Team	Time
1	Gerben Thijssen (BEL)	Intermarché–Wanty–Gobert Matériaux	4h 17' 44"
2	Pascal Ackermann (GER)	UAE Team Emirates	+ 0"
3	Sam Welsford (AUS)	Team DSM	+ 0"
4	Lionel Taminiaux (BEL)	Alpecin–Deceuninck	+ 0"
5	Jakub Mareczko (ITA)	Alpecin–Deceuninck	+ 0"
6	Rüdiger Selig (GER)	Lotto–Dstny	+ 0"
7	Juan Sebastián Molano (COL)	UAE Team Emirates	+ 0"
8	Sean Flynn (GBR)	Team DSM	+ 0"
9	Kristoffer Halvorsen (NOR)	Uno-X Pro Cycling Team	+ 0"
10	Edward Theuns (BEL)	Trek–Segafredo	+ 0"
