= 2024 UEC European Track Championships – Men's madison =

Men's madison at the 2024 UEC European Track Championships
- Venue: Omnisport Apeldoorn, Apeldoorn
- Date: 11 January
- Competitors: 32 from 16 nations
- Teams: 16
- Winning points: 64

Medalists
| gold medal | Roger Kluge; Theo Reinhardt | Germany |
| silver medal | Thomas Boudat; Donavan Grondin | France |
| bronze medal | Michael Mørkøv; Theodor Storm | Denmark |

The men's madison competition at the 2024 UEC European Track Championships was held on 11 January 2024.

== Results ==
200 laps (50 km) with 20 sprints were raced.

| Rank | Name | Nation | Lap points | Sprint points | Finish order | Total points |
|---|---|---|---|---|---|---|
| 1st place, gold medalist(s) | Roger Kluge; Theo Reinhardt | Germany | 20 | 44 | 4 | 64 |
| 2nd place, silver medalist(s) | Thomas Boudat; Donavan Grondin | France | 20 | 40 | 5 | 60 |
| 3rd place, bronze medalist(s) | Michael Mørkøv; Theodor Storm | Denmark | 20 | 30 | 3 | 50 |
| 4 | Rui Oliveira; Iúri Leitão | Portugal | 20 | 27 | 1 | 47 |
| 5 | Lindsay De Vylder; Fabio Van den Bossche | Belgium | 20 | 22 | 6 | 42 |
| 6 | Alan Banaszek; Wojciech Pszczolarski | Poland | 20 | 4 | 12 | 24 |
| 7 | Ethan Hayter; Mark Stewart | Great Britain | 0 | 19 | 7 | 19 |
| 8 | Yoeri Havik; Jan Willem van Schip | Netherlands | 0 | 18 | 13 | 18 |
| 9 | Simone Consonni; Michele Scartezzini | Italy | 0 | 17 | 2 | 17 |
| 10 | Sebastián Mora; Albert Torres | Spain | 0 | 4 | 8 | 4 |
| 11 | Lukas Rüegg; Simon Vitzthum | Switzerland | 0 | 10 | 3 | 3 |
| 12 | Denis Rugovac; Jan Voneš | Czech Republic | 0 | 2 | 9 | 2 |
| 13 | Felix Ritzinger; Maximilian Schmidbauer | Austria | 0 | 1 | 11 | 1 |
| 14 | Mykyta Yakovlev; Daniil Yakovlev | Ukraine | –40 | 0 | – | DNF |
| 15 | Amit Keinan; Vladislav Loginov | Israel | –40 | 0 | – | DNF |
| 16 | Martin Chren; Pavol Rovder | Slovakia | –40 | 0 | – | DNF |
