= Grand Prix Rüebliland =

Cycling race

Race details
- Date: September
- Region: Aargau, Switzerland
- Discipline: Road race
- Type: Stage race

History
- First edition: 1977
- Editions: 49 (as of 2025)
- First winner: Greg Alison (USA)
- Most wins: Gerrit de Vries (NED) (2 wins)
- Most recent: Karl Herzog (GER)

The Grand Prix Rüebliland is a junior (ages 17–18) multi-day cycling race held annually in the Canton of Aargau, Switzerland. It was part of the UCI Junior World Cup until 2007.

== Winners ==
Year	Winner	Second	Third
1977	(United States) Greg Alison		
1978	(Switzerland) Jürg Bruggmann		
1979	(Belgium) Nikolaas Emonds		
1980	(Switzerland) Niki Rüttimann		
1981	(Netherlands) Mathieu Hermans		
1982	(Italy) Enrico Pezzetti		
1983	(Socialist Federal Republic of Yugoslavia) Sandi Papez		
1984	(Netherlands) Gerrit de Vries		
1985	(Netherlands) Gerrit de Vries	(Switzerland) Simone Pedrazzini	(Switzerland) Felice Puttini
1986	(Netherlands) Antoine Lagerwey	(France) Armand De Las Cuevas	(Switzerland) Laurent Dufaux
1987	(Germany) Reto Matt	(Switzerland) Roger Devittori	(Germany) Martin Königsberger
1988	(Italy) Luca Cirimbelli	(Switzerland) Beat Zberg	(Italy) Davide Rebellin
1989	(Switzerland) Beat Zberg	(Switzerland) Oscar Camenzind	(Italy) Marco Serpellini
1990	(Norway) Trond Bjerkly	(Norway) Hans Petter Erikstad	(Germany) Torsten Schmidt
1991	(Switzerland) Roland Müller	(Italy) Pasquale Santoro	(Soviet Union) Mesrop Shabioan
1992	(Italy) Davide Dante	(Switzerland) Marcel Renggli	(Italy) Federico Tozzo
1993	(France) Cyrille Legrand	(Denmark) René Jørgensen	(France) Laurent Lefèvre
1994	(Italy) Allessandro Brendolin	(Switzerland) Marcel Strauss	(Switzerland) Patrick Calcagni
1995	(Italy) Antonio Rizzi	(Slovenia) Leon Bergant	(Portugal) Rui Roque
1996	(Germany) Stephan Schreck	(Italy) Claudio Bartoli	(Switzerland) Milovan Stanic
1997	(Switzerland) Sandro Güttinger	(Germany) Matthias Kessler	(Italy) Michele Scarponi
1998	(Switzerland) Xavier Pache	(Belgium) Roy Sentjens	(Denmark) Lars Bak
1999	(Italy) Antonio Bucciero	(Netherlands) Theo Eltink	(Italy) Giacomo Garofoli
2000	(Switzerland) Daniel Gysling	(Denmark) Hans Henrik Jørgensen	(Germany) Daniel Musiol
2001	(Netherlands) Niels Scheuneman	(France) Mathieu Perget	(Germany) Sebastian Schwager
2002	(Netherlands) Jos Harms	(Netherlands) Thomas Dekker	(Slovakia) Matej Jurčo
2003	(Slovakia) Martin Velits	(Norway) Anders Lund	(Switzerland) Thomas Frei
2004	(Czech Republic) Roman Kreuziger	(Italy) Eros Capecchi	(Switzerland) Marcel Wyss
2005	(Netherlands) Martijn Keizer	(Denmark) Thomas Guldhammer	(France) Etienne Pieret
2006	(Germany) Björn Thurau	(Italy) Giorgio Brambilla	(Slovenia) Marko Kump
2007	(France) Dimitri Le Boulch	(Belgium) Yannick Eijssen	(Czech Republic) Marek Benda
2008	(Switzerland) Cyrille Thièry	(Netherlands) Jelle Posthuma	(Japan) Masanori Noguchi
2009	(Netherlands) Oscar Riesebeek	(Luxembourg) Bob Jungels	(Denmark) Pelle Niklas Clapp
2010	(Luxembourg) Bob Jungels	(Netherlands) Daan Olivier	(Germany) Mario Vogt
2011	(France) Alexis Gougeard	(France) Adrien Legros	(Belgium) Louis Vervaeke
2012	(Netherlands) Sam Oomen	(Russia) Ildar Arslanov	(Switzerland) Tom Bohli
2013	(Netherlands) Mathieu van der Poel	(Denmark) Mads Pedersen	(Australia) Ayden Toovey
2014	(Germany) Lennard Kämna	(Russia) Pavel Sivakov	(France) Rayane Bouhanni
2015	(Switzerland) Marc Hirschi	(Switzerland) Gino Mäder	(Denmark) Niklas Larsen
2016	(Switzerland) Reto Müller	(Italy) Alessandro Covi	(Switzerland) Marc Hirschi
2017	(United Kingdom) Tom Pidcock	(France) Alexis Renard	(Russia) Ivan Smirnov
2018	(Netherlands) Enzo Leijnse	(Eritrea) Biniam Girmay	(Norway) Daniel Arnes
2019	(United States) Quinn Simmons	(Norway) Fredrik Gjesteland	(United States) Magnus Sheffield
2020	(Ukraine) Andrii Ponomar	(France) Enzo Paleni	(Denmark) Adam Holm Jørgensen
2021	(Norway) Trym Brennsæter	(United Kingdom) Finlay Pickering	(United States) Colby Simmons
2022	(Germany) Emil Herzog	(Norway) Jørgen Nordhagen	(Denmark) Theodor Storm
2023	(France) Léo Bisiaux	(Denmark) Theodor Storm	(Netherlands) Ko Molenaar
2024	(Denmark) Theodor August Clemmensen	(Denmark) Noah Lindholm Møller Andersen	(Denmark) Anton Louw Larsen
2025	(Germany) Karl Herzog	(Denmark) Noah Lindholm Møller Andersen	(Latvia) Georgs Tjumins
