= Gerben Thijssen =

Belgian road and track cyclist

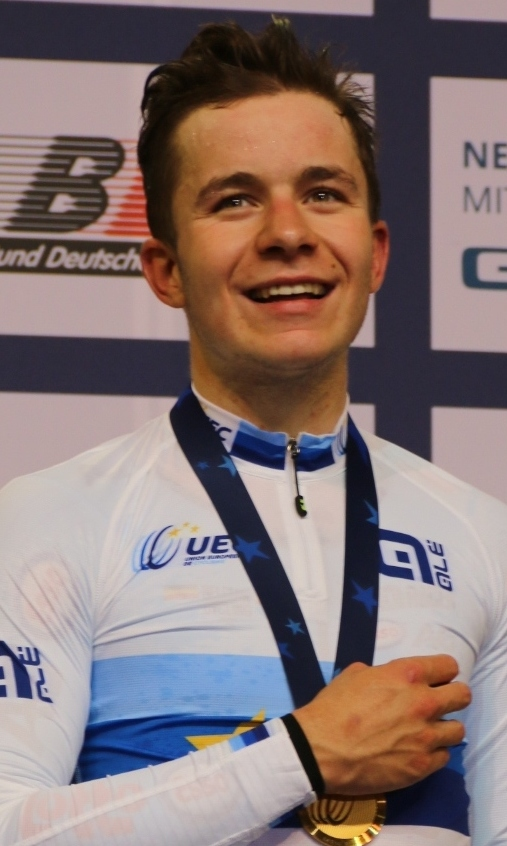
- Thijssen in 2017

Personal information
- Full name: Gerben Thijssen
- Born: 21 June 1998 (age 28) Genk, Belgium
- Height: 1.75 m (5 ft 9 in)
- Weight: 67 kg (148 lb)

Cycling career
- Sport: Cycling
- Current team: Alpecin–Premier Tech
- Disciplines: Track; Road
- Role: Rider
- Rider type: Sprinter

Amateur teams
- 2017–2019: Lotto–Soudal U23
- 2018: Lotto–Soudal (stagiaire)

Professional teams
- 2019–2021: Lotto–Soudal
- 2022–: Intermarché–Wanty–Gobert Matériaux
- 2026–: Alpecin–Premier Tech

Major wins
- One-day races and Classics Bredene Koksijde Classic (2023)
Medal record
Representing Belgium
Men's track cycling
European Championships
Gold medal – first place	2017 Berlin	Elimination race

Gerben Thijssen (born 21 June 1998) is a Belgian road and track cyclist, who currently rides for UCI WorldTeam Alpecin–Premier Tech.

== Career ==
Thijssen won the bronze medal at the 2015 UCI Juniors Track World Championships in the points race. He won the silver medal at the 2016–17 UCI Track Cycling World Cup in Apeldoorn in the team pursuit. In 2016, as a junior he won 2 stages in the Nations Cup Trofeo Karlsberg, the Omloop van de Vlaamse Gewesten and a Belgian Cup stage in Nederhasselt. He represented Belgium at the UCI Juniors Road World Championships in Qatar. In 2017, as a U23-rider he won the Grote Prijs Stad Sint-Niklaas and a stage in Olympia's Tour. He won the gold medal at the 2017 UEC European Track Championships in the Elite Elimination Race. In 2018, he was the Belgian champion in the U23-category. In November 2019, Thijssen crashed out of the Six Days of Ghent, suffering three small brain haemorrhages before being admitted to intensive care.

In October 2020, he was named in the startlist for the 2020 Vuelta a España.

In October 2023, Thijssen and Estonian rider Madis Mihkels were pulled by their team from the Tour of Guangxi, after Mihkels made a racist gesture. Mihkels pulled his eyes into slants, in a picture Thijssen posted on his Instagram.

== Major results ==
=== Road ===
2016
1st Omloop der Vlaamse Gewesten
Trofeo Karlsberg

1st Stages 1 & 2a

1st Stage 1 Internationale Cottbuser Junioren-Etappenfahrt
2017
1st Grote Prijs Stad Sint-Niklaas
1st Stage 4 Olympia's Tour
2nd Gooikse Pijl
3rd Paris–Tours Espoirs
7th Ronde van Overijssel
7th Eschborn-Frankfurt City Loop U23
2018
1st Road race, National Under-23 Championships
5th Paris–Troyes
2019
1st Memorial Van Coningsloo
1st Stage 1 Paris–Arras Tour
4th Overall Tour d'Eure-et-Loir

1st Young rider classification
1st Stage 2

6th Road race, UEC European Under-23 Championships
2020
2nd Gooikse Pijl
2021
3rd Omloop van het Houtland
5th Grand Prix de Fourmies
2022 (3 pro wins)
1st Gooikse Pijl
1st Stage 2 Tour de Pologne
1st Stage 6 Four Days of Dunkirk
2nd Veenendaal–Veenendaal Classic
3rd Grote Prijs Marcel Kint
4th Grote Prijs Jean-Pierre Monseré
5th Bredene Koksijde Classic
7th Antwerp Port Epic
7th Kampioenschap van Vlaanderen
9th Omloop van het Houtland
2023 (4)
1st Bredene Koksijde Classic
1st Grote Prijs Jean-Pierre Monseré
1st Ronde van Limburg
1st Omloop van het Houtland
2nd Grand Prix de Fourmies
2nd La Roue Tourangelle
3rd Van Merksteijn Fences Classic
4th Gooikse Pijl
5th Scheldeprijs
5th Elfstedenronde
8th Albert Achterhes Profronde van Drenthe
2024 (2)
1st Trofeo Palma
Volta ao Algarve

1st Points classification
1st Stage 1

2nd Grand Prix de Fourmies
2nd La Roue Tourangelle
3rd Bredene Koksijde Classic
3rd Grand Prix d'Isbergues
4th Omloop van het Houtland
5th Clásica de Almería
5th Ronde van Limburg
5th Kampioenschap van Vlaanderen
9th Heistse Pijl
2025
3rd La Roue Tourangelle
3rd Gooikse Pijl
5th Omloop van het Houtland
9th Grote Prijs Jean-Pierre Monseré
10th Paris–Chauny
2026
2nd Circuit de Wallonie
4th Ronde van Limburg
7th Famenne Ardenne Classic
8th Grand Prix de Fourmies
10th Bredene Koksijde Classic
10th Gooikse Pijl

==== Grand Tour general classification results timeline ====
Grand Tour	2020	2021	2022
Giro d'Italia	—	—	—
Tour de France	—	—	—
Vuelta a España	DNF	—	DNF

Legend
—	Did not compete
DNF	Did not finish

=== Track ===
2015
National Junior Championships

1st Madison (with Robbe Ghys)
3rd Keirin

2nd Madison, UEC European Junior Championships (with Robbe Ghys)
3rd Points race, UCI World Junior Championships
2016
National Junior Championships

1st Omnium
1st Points race
2nd Elimination
2nd Individual pursuit
2nd Kilo
2nd Madison (with Sasha Weemaes)

1st Six Days of Ghent U23 (with Jules Hesters)
UEC European Junior Championships

2nd Madison (with Jules Hesters)
3rd Points race

2nd Team pursuit, UCI World Cup, Apeldoorn
2017
1st Elimination, UEC European Championships
2nd Team pursuit, UEC European Under-23 Championships
2019
2nd Team pursuit, UEC European Under-23 Championships
2nd Omnium, National Championships
