= Donavan Grondin =

French racing cyclist

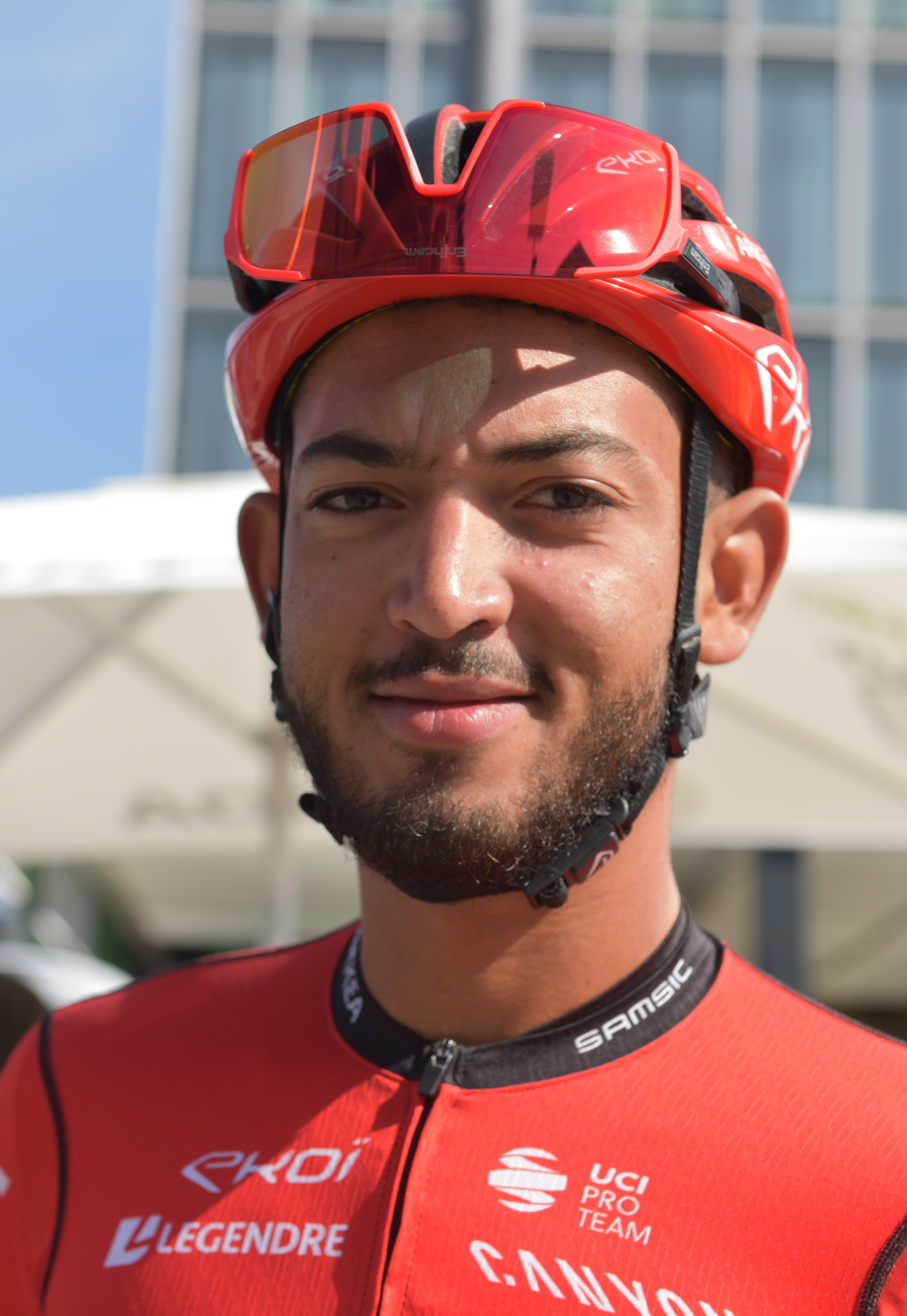
- Grondin in 2022

Personal information
- Full name: Donavan Vincent Grondin
- Born: 26 September 2000 (age 26) Saint-Pierre, Réunion, France
- Height: 1.83 m (6 ft 0 in)
- Weight: 77 kg (170 lb)

Cycling career
- Sport: Cycling
- Current team: Véloce Club Rouen 76
- Disciplines: Road; Track
- Role: Rider

Amateur team
- 2019: Vendée U

Professional teams
- 2020–2025: Arkéa–Samsic
- 2026-: Véloce Club Rouen 76

Major wins
- Track World Championships Madison (2022) Scratch (2021)
Medal record
Men's track cycling
Representing France
Olympic Games
Bronze medal – third place	2020 Tokyo	Madison
World Championships
Gold medal – first place	2021 Roubaix	Scratch
Gold medal – first place	2022 Saint-Quentin-en-Yvelines	Madison
European Championships
Gold medal – first place	2022 Munich	Omnium
Silver medal – second place	2022 Munich	Madison
Silver medal – second place	2024 Apeldoorn	Madison
Bronze medal – third place	2023 Grenchen	Points race
Bronze medal – third place	2023 Grenchen	Scratch
Bronze medal – third place	2023 Grenchen	Madison

Donavan Grondin (born 26 September 2000) is a French racing cyclist, who currently rides for UCI Continental Team Véloce Club Rouen 76.

== Major results ==
=== Track ===
2017
National Junior Championships

1st Madison
2nd Elimination race
3rd Team pursuit

2019
National Championships

1st Omnium
1st Madison (with Florian Maître)
1st Team pursuit
3rd Scratch

2021
1st Scratch, UCI World Championships
3rd Madison, Olympic Games (with Benjamin Thomas)
2022
1st Madison, UCI World Championships (with Benjamin Thomas)
2023
UCI Nations Cup

1st Omnium, Milton
3rd Team pursuit, Milton

UEC European Championships

3rd Madison (with Benjamin Thomas)
3rd Points race
3rd Scratch

2024
2nd Madison, UEC European Championships (with Thomas Boudat)

=== Road ===
2017
4th Chrono des Nations Juniors
6th Overall Trophée Centre Morbihan

1st Young rider classification

7th Bernaudeau Junior
2018
National Junior Championships

1st Road race
3rd Time trial

2nd Chrono des Nations Juniors
6th Bernaudeau Junior
2022
7th Grote Prijs Jean-Pierre Monseré
2023
7th Classic Loire Atlantique
10th La Roue Tourangelle

==== Grand Tour general classification results timeline ====
Grand Tour	2024
Giro d'Italia	119
Tour de France	—
Vuelta a España	—

Legend
—	Did not compete
DNF	Did not finish
