= Theodor Storm (cyclist) =

Danish cyclist (born 2005)

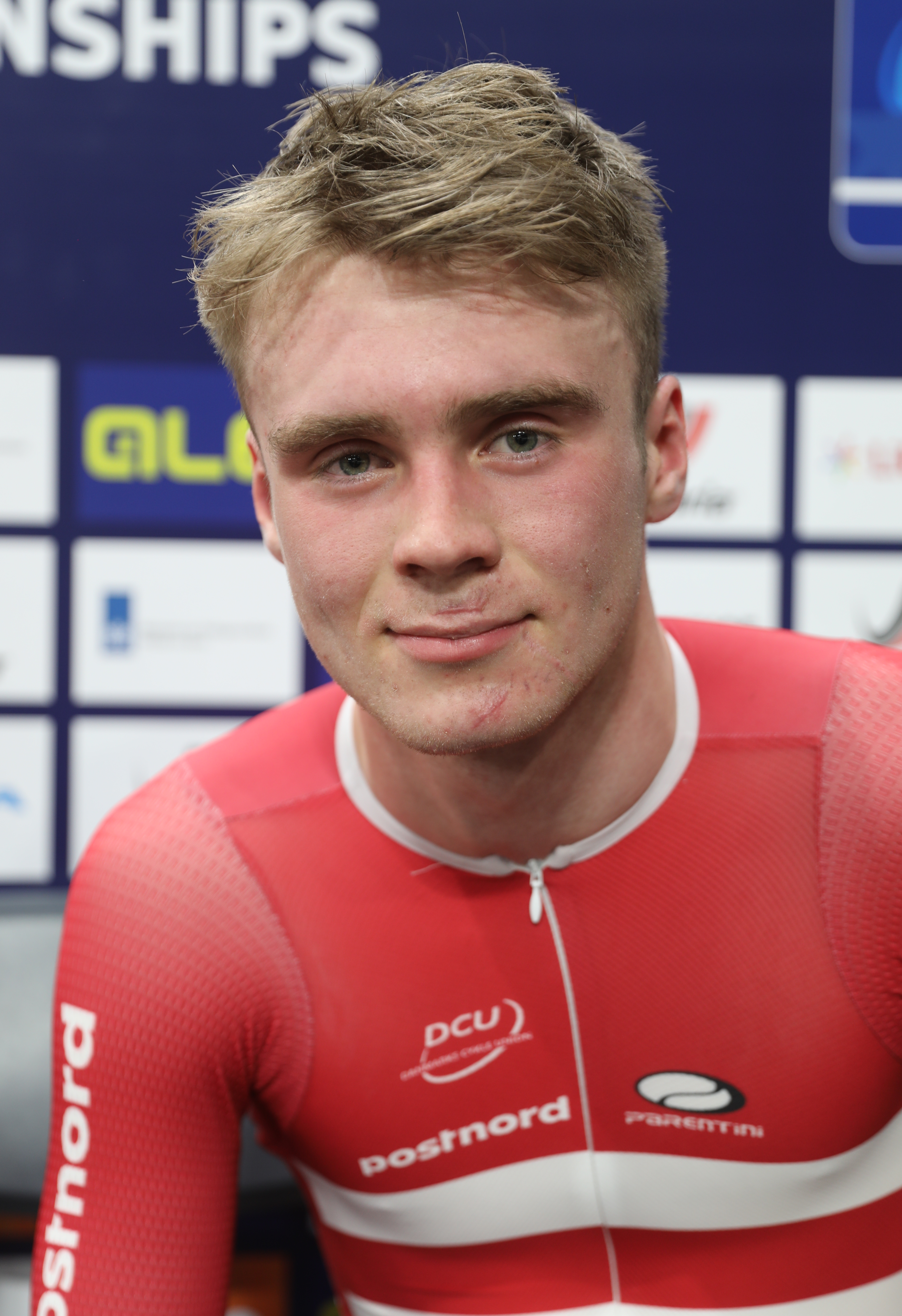
- Theodor Storm (2024)

Personal information
- Born: 31 March 2005 (age 21) Roskilde, Denmark
- Height: 1.81 m (5 ft 11 in)

Cycling career
- Sport: Cycling
- Current team: Team Lotto–Kern Haus Outlet Montabaur
- Disciplines: Road; Track
- Role: Rider

Amateur team
- 2022–2023: NPV–Carl Ras Roskilde

Professional teams
- 2024: INEOS Grenadiers
- 2025: Team Lotto–Kern Haus PSD Bank
- 2026: Ineos Grenadiers Racing Academy
Medal record
Men's track cycling
Representing Denmark
European Championships
Bronze medal – third place	2024 Apeldoorn	Madison
World Junior Championships
Silver medal – second place	2022 Tel Aviv	Individual pursuit

Theodor Storm (born 31 March 2005) is a Danish cyclist, who currently rides for Ineos Grenadiers Racing Academy.

== Career ==
In December 2021, Storm won a bronze medal at the Danish Track Championships in the senior madison race with Conrad Haugsted.

=== 2023 ===
Storm rode in 2022 and 2023 for the Danish team NPV–Carl Ras Roskilde. Aged 17 years-old, Storm raced at the 2023 UEC European Track Championships in Grenchen, Switzerland in February 2023 against elite riders.

He finished third at the Paris–Roubaix Juniors in 2023 and also finished fifth in the junior road race at the UCI Road World Championships in Glasgow in August 2023 after helping teammate Albert Philipsen to victory.

=== 2024 ===
He signed to ride for UCI WorldTeam Netcompany–Ineos from 2024, agreeing to a three-year contract. He was initially due to turn pro with Ineos in 2025, but his pathway was fast-tracked in December 2023 to move straight from juniors and skip the U23s into the World Tour. However, after competing in the Madison at the 2024 UEC European Track Championships, he was diagnosed with autoimmune illness Guillain-Barré syndrome which led to him being hospitalised for a few months in 2024 and was unable to compete in the road season.

=== 2025-present ===
In 2025, he moved to UCI Continental team Team Lotto–Kern Haus PSD Bank and was set to return to Ineos for the 2026 season as part of the newly formed Ineos Grenadiers Racing Academy. However, he could not race in 2026 after suffering broken bones in his back following a crash during a winter training ride. In November 2026, he signed for Danish team ColoQuick.

== Major results ==
=== Road ===
2022
2nd Road race, National Junior Championships
3rd Overall Grand Prix Rüebliland
5th Overall Aubel–Thimister–Stavelot

1st Points classification
1st Young rider classification
1st Stage 2b

2023
1st Omloop van Borsele
1st Mountains classification, Saarland Trofeo
National Junior Championships

2nd Road race
3rd Time trial

2nd Overall Grand Prix Rüebliland

1st Stage 2b

3rd Paris–Roubaix Juniors
4th Trofeo Emilio Paganessi
5th Road race, UCI World Junior Championships
7th Overall Course de la Paix Juniors

=== Track ===
2024
3rd Madison, UEC European Championships (with Michael Mørkøv)
