= Sam Welsford =

Australian cyclist (born 1996)

Sam Welsford OAM
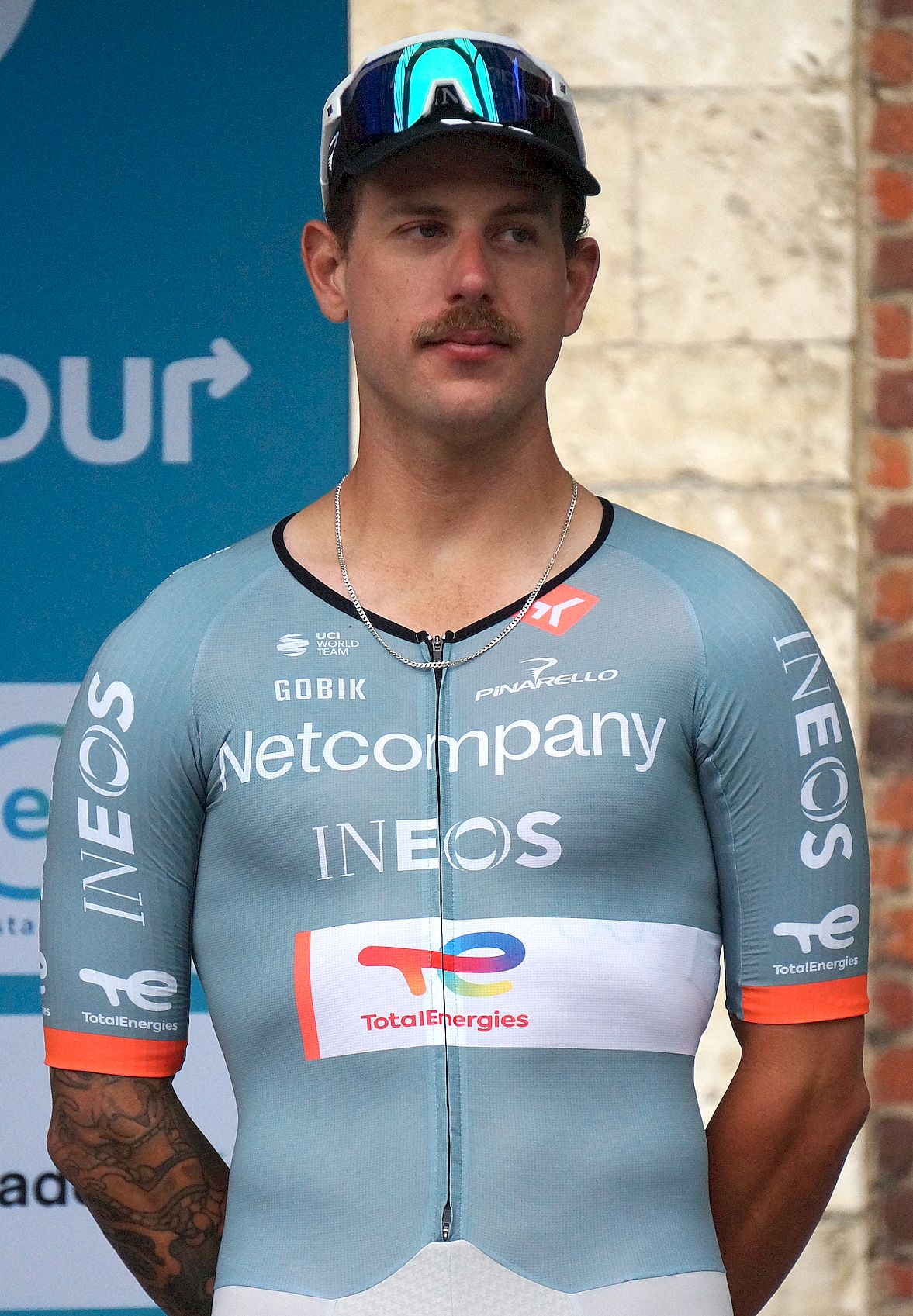
- Welsford in 2026

Personal information
- Full name: Sam Welsford
- Born: 19 January 1996 (age 30) Perth, Western Australia
- Height: 1.80 m (5 ft 11 in)
- Weight: 82 kg (181 lb)

Cycling career
- Sport: Cycling
- Current team: Netcompany–Ineos
- Disciplines: Track; Road
- Role: Rider
- Rider type: Sprinter (road) Pursuit (track)

Professional teams
- 2018–2019: ACA–Ride Sunshine Coast
- 2022–2023: Team DSM
- 2024–2025: Bora–Hansgrohe
- 2026–: Netcompany INEOS

Major wins
- Track Olympic Games Team pursuit (2024) World Championships Scratch (2019) Team pursuit (2016, 2017, 2019)
Medal record
Men's track cycling
Representing Australia
Olympic Games
Gold medal – first place	2024 Paris	Team pursuit
Silver medal – second place	2016 Rio de Janeiro	Team pursuit
Bronze medal – third place	2020 Tokyo	Team pursuit
World Championships
Gold medal – first place	2016 London	Team pursuit
Gold medal – first place	2017 Hong Kong	Team pursuit
Gold medal – first place	2019 Pruszków	Scratch
Gold medal – first place	2019 Pruszków	Team pursuit
Commonwealth Games
Gold medal – first place	2018 Gold Coast	Team pursuit
Gold medal – first place	2018 Gold Coast	Scratch

Sam Welsford OAM (born 19 January 1996) is an Australian professional racing cyclist, who currently rides for UCI WorldTeam Netcompany–Ineos.

== Cycling career ==
Welsford's father was a keen cyclist, and Sam began joining him on rides when he was seven. Welsford worked hard at his cycling and won team pursuit junior world titles in 2013 and 2014.

He rode in the men's team pursuit at the 2016 UCI Track Cycling World Championships winning a gold medal. Welsford won the 2019 UCI Men's elite Scratch race world championships less than an hour after breaking the Men's team pursuit World Record in a time of 3 minutes 48.012 seconds.

Welsford qualified for the Tokyo 2020 Olympics and was part of the Men's team pursuit together with Kelland O'Brien, Leigh Howard and Alexander Porter. They secured a bronze medal after overlapping New Zealand who had crashed. Welsford also competed in the Men's Madison where the team finished fifth with a time of 3:48.448 and therefore did not qualify for the final.

After spending much of his career as a track specialist with occasional forays onto the road, Welsford signed with UCI WorldTeam Team DSM in November 2021, for two years.

Welsford participated in the 2024 Tour Down Under, where he won in three group sprints on the first, third, and fourth stages.

Beginning his 2026 season at the Santos Tour Down Under, Welsford won Stage 3, sprinting to victory in Nairne for his seventh-ever TDU stage win and his first with Ineos Grenadiers after being delivered perfectly by his team in a chaotic finale.

== Major results ==
=== Road ===
2011
2nd Time trial, National Novice Championships
2014
1st Stage 1 Goldfields Classic
2016
2nd National Under-23 Criterium Championships
2017
1st Overall Tour of Gippsland

1st Stages 1, 2 & 3

2nd Melbourne to Warrnambool Classic
2018
1st Noosa International Criterium
2nd Oita Ikoinomichi Criterium
3rd National Under-23 Criterium Championships
3rd Overall Tour of the King Valley

1st Stage 2

4th Overall Tour of the Great South Coast

1st Stage 3

2019
1st Wal Smith Memorial - Casterton 50
1st Stage 1 Tour of the Riverland
3rd Overall Tour of the Great South Coast

1st Stages 1 & 3

2020
1st National Criterium Championships
1st Overall Bay Classic Series

1st Stage 1

2022 (1 pro win)
1st Stage 5 Tour of Turkey
3rd Scheldeprijs
4th Bredene Koksijde Classic
2023 (4)
1st Grand Prix Criquielion
Vuelta a San Juan

1st Stages 6 & 7

1st Stage 4 Renewi Tour
2nd Overall ZLM Tour
2nd Scheldeprijs
3rd Bredene Koksijde Classic
3rd Veenendaal–Veenendaal Classic
2024 (4)
Tour Down Under

1st Points classification
1st Stages 1, 3 & 4

1st Stage 1 Tour de Hongrie
7th Scheldeprijs
2025 (3)
1st National Criterium Championships
Tour Down Under

1st Points classification
1st Stages 1, 2 & 6

2nd Surf Coast Classic
10th Classic Brugge–De Panne
2026 (1)
1st Stage 3 Tour Down Under
3rd Copenhagen Sprint

==== Grand Tour general classification results timeline ====
Grand Tour	2023
Giro d'Italia	—
Tour de France	144
Vuelta a España	—

Legend
—	Did not compete
DNF	Did not finish
IP	Race in Progress

=== Track ===
2013
UCI World Junior Championships

1st Team pursuit
1st Omnium
3rd Madison (with Joshua Harrison)

2014
UCI World Junior Championships

1st Team pursuit
2nd Omnium

Oceania Championships

1st Team pursuit
1st Madison (with Scott Law)

National Championships

2nd Team pursuit
2nd Madison (with Matthew Jackson)
3rd Individual pursuit
3rd Scratch

2015
2nd Scratch, Oceania Championships
National Championships

2nd Points race
2nd Scratch
2nd Omnium

2016
1st Team pursuit, UCI World Championships
1st Individual pursuit, National Championships
2nd Team pursuit, Olympic Games
2017
1st Team pursuit, UCI World Championships
Oceania Championships

1st Team pursuit
1st Points race
3rd Omnium

National Championships

1st Madison (with Cameron Meyer)
1st Team pursuit
1st Scratch

2018
Commonwealth Games

1st Scratch
1st Team pursuit

National Championships

1st Individual pursuit
2nd Team sprint

UCI World Cup

1st Omnium, Berlin
1st Team pursuit, Berlin

2019
UCI World Championships

1st Scratch
1st Team pursuit

Oceania Championships

1st Omnium
1st Scratch

National Championships

2nd Madison (with Cameron Scott)
3rd Team pursuit

UCI World Cup

2nd Madison, Hong Kong (with Kelland O'Brien)
3rd Madison, Glasgow (with Leigh Howard)

2nd Six Days of Melbourne (with Cameron Scott)
3rd Six Days of Brisbane (with Cameron Scott)
2020
Oceania Championships

1st Omnium
1st Madison (with Kelland O'Brien)

2021
3rd Team pursuit, Olympic Games
2024
1st Team pursuit, Olympic Games
