= Moritz Malcharek =

German cyclist (born 1997)

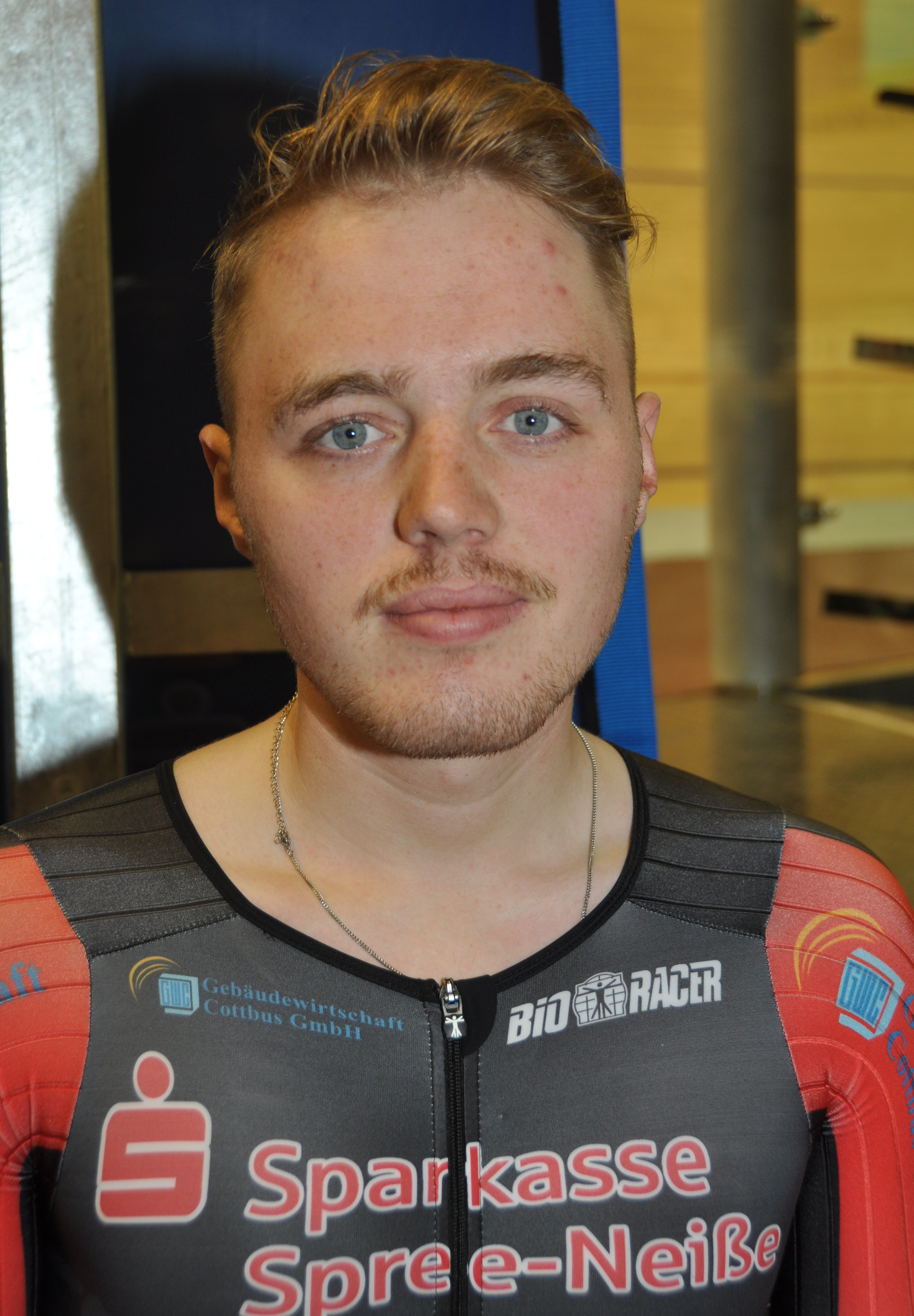
- Malcharek in 2018

Personal information
- Full name: Moritz Malcharek
- Born: 29 July 1997 (age 29)
- Height: 1.74 m (5 ft 9 in)
- Weight: 72.5 kg (160 lb)

Cycling career
- Sport: Cycling
- Current team: Maloja Pushbikers
- Disciplines: Track; Road
- Role: Rider

Amateur teams
- 2008: SC Berlin
- 2009–2016: RSV Werner Otto Berlin
- 2014–2015: LV–Corratec–Berlin Team
- 2016: RG KED–Stevens Rad Team Berlin

Professional teams
- 2017–2020: LKT Team Brandenburg
- 2021–2022: Rad-Net Rose Team
- 2023–: Maloja Pushbikers
Medal record
Men's track cycling
Representing Germany
European Championships
Silver medal – second place	2022 Munich	Scratch

Moritz Malcharek (born 29 July 1997) is a German road and track cyclist, who currently rides for UCI Continental team Maloja Pushbikers. Representing Germany at international competitions, Malcharek competed at the 2016 UEC European Track Championships in the scratch event.

== Major results ==
=== Track ===
2018
2018–19 UCI World Cup

1st Points race, Saint-Quentin-en-Yvelines

2nd Omnium, UEC European Under-23 Championships
2019
UEC European Under-23 Championships

1st Scratch
3rd Omnium

2021
UCI Nations Cup, Hong Kong

1st Madison (with Theo Reinhardt)
2nd Scratch
3rd Elimination

2022
2nd Scratch, UEC European Championships
UCI Champions League

2nd Scratch, London

=== Road ===
2014
1st Stage 3 (TTT) Sint-Martinusprijs Kontich
2016
1st Stage 5 Oder-Rundfahrt
2019
2nd Overall Tour of America's Dairyland

1st Stages 1, 9 & 11
