= Adrien Garel =

French cyclist

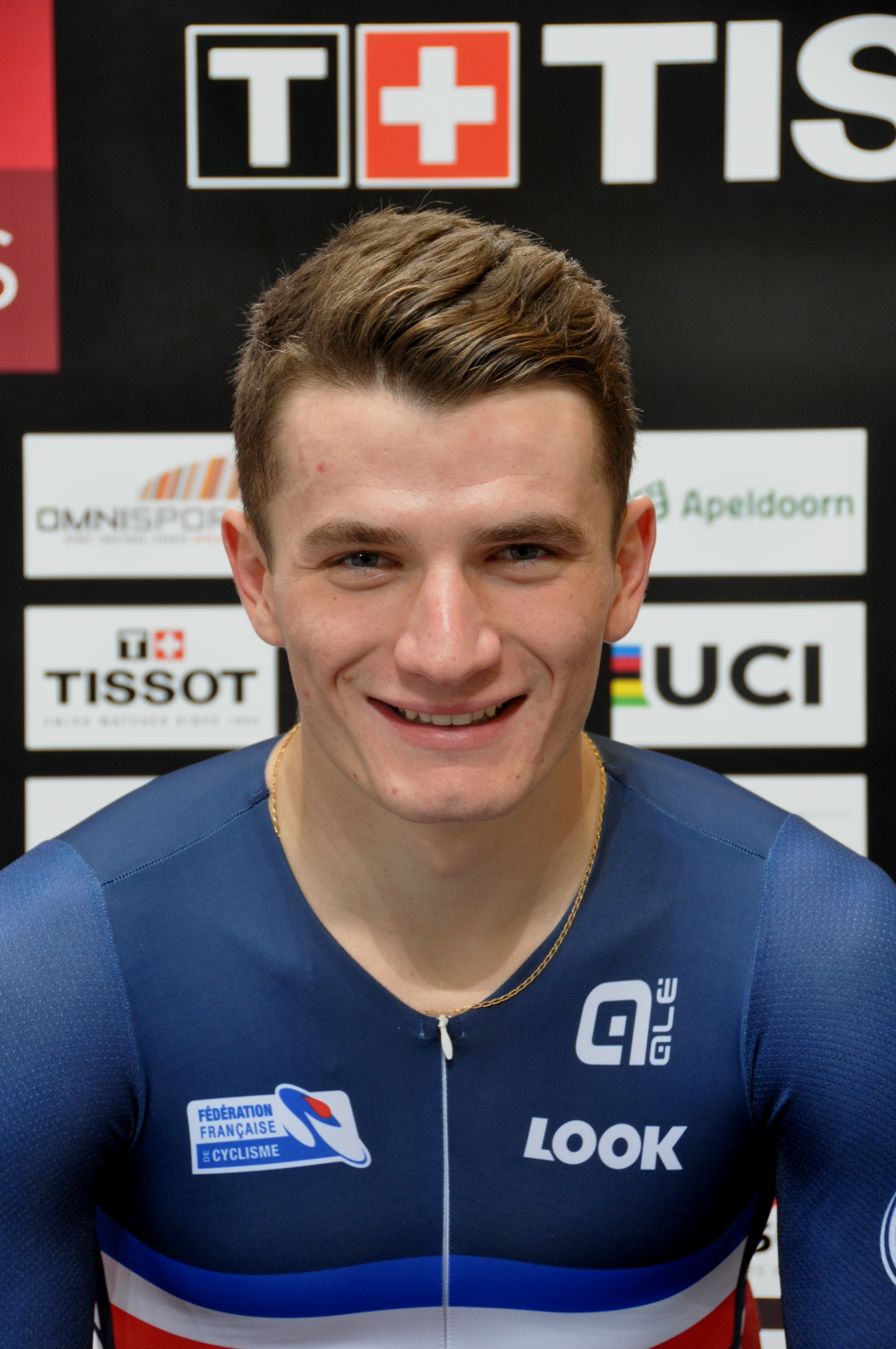
- Garel in 2016

Personal information
- Full name: Adrien Garel
- Born: 12 March 1996 (age 30) Bagneux, Hauts-de-Seine, France

Cycling career
- Sport: Cycling
- Current team: Sojasun Espoir–ACNC
- Disciplines: Track; Road
- Role: Rider

Amateur teams
- 2013–2014: CC Nogent-sur-Oise Junior
- 2015–2016: CC Nogent-sur-Oise
- 2017: VC Pays de Loudéac
- 2021–: Sojasun Espoir–ACNC

Professional team
- 2018–2020: Vital Concept
Medal record
Men's track cycling
Representing France
European Championships
Gold medal – first place	2017 Berlin	Scratch
Silver medal – second place	2018 Glasgow	Scratch
Bronze medal – third place	2023 Grenchen	Team pursuit

Adrien Garel (born 12 March 1996) is a French road and track cyclist who currently rides for French amateur team Sojasun Espoir–ACNC. He won the bronze medal at the 2016–17 UCI Track Cycling World Cup, Round 2 in Apeldoorn in the team pursuit.

== Major results ==
2019
10th Polynormande
2023
5th Flèche de Locminé
