= Oliver Wood (cyclist) =

British cyclist (born 1995)

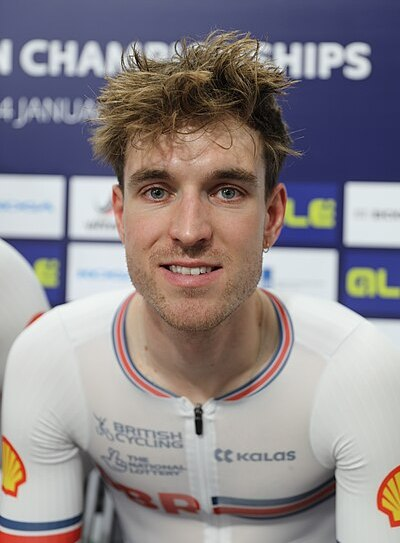
- Wood in 2024

Personal information
- Born: 26 November 1995 (age 30) Wakefield, England
- Height: 1.82 m (6 ft 0 in)
- Weight: 72 kg (159 lb)

Cycling career
- Sport: Cycling
- Current team: Saint Piran
- Disciplines: Road; Track
- Role: Rider

Amateur team
- 2023: Velo Schils Interbike Racing Team

Professional teams
- 2017: WIGGINS
- 2018: JLT–Condor
- 2019–2023: Canyon dhb p/b Bloor Homes
- 2024–: Saint Piran

Major wins
- Track World Championships Team pursuit (2022)
Medal record
Men's track cycling
Representing Great Britain
Olympic Games
Silver medal – second place	2024 Paris	Team pursuit
World Championships
Gold medal – first place	2022 Saint-Quentin-en-Yvelines	Team pursuit
Silver medal – second place	2019 Pruszków	Team pursuit
Silver medal – second place	2022 Saint-Quentin-en-Yvelines	Madison
Silver medal – second place	2023 Glasgow	Madison
Silver medal – second place	2024 Ballerup	Team pursuit
Bronze medal – third place	2021 Roubaix	Team pursuit
Bronze medal – third place	2026 Shanghai	Team pursuit
European Championships
Gold medal – first place	2023 Grenchen	Scratch
Gold medal – first place	2024 Apeldoorn	Team pursuit
Silver medal – second place	2023 Grenchen	Team pursuit
Bronze medal – third place	2016 Yvelines	Team pursuit
Bronze medal – third place	2018 Glasgow	Madison
Bronze medal – third place	2018 Glasgow	Team pursuit
Bronze medal – third place	2019 Apeldoorn	Omnium
Bronze medal – third place	2019 Apeldoorn	Team pursuit
Bronze medal – third place	2020 Plovdiv	Scratch
Bronze medal – third place	2021 Grenchen	Team pursuit
Bronze medal – third place	2022 Munich	Team pursuit
Bronze medal – third place	2026 Konya	Team pursuit
U23 & Junior European Championships
Gold medal – first place	2015 Athens	U23 Team pursuit
Silver medal – second place	2014 Anadia	U23 Scratch
Silver medal – second place	2015 Athens	U23 Omnium
Bronze medal – third place	2016 Montichiari	U23 Team pursuit
Representing England
Commonwealth Games
Silver medal – second place	2018 Gold Coast	Team pursuit
Silver medal – second place	2022 Birmingham	Team pursuit

Oliver Wood (also known as Ollie or Oli; born 26 November 1995) is an English cyclist, who rides for UCI Continental team Saint Piran.

Wood represents Great Britain at international competitions in track cycling. He won a gold medal in the 2022 World Championships in the team pursuit, and has multiple silver and bronze medals in the team pursuit, madison, scratch race and omnium disciplines at other international championships.

Wood was part of Great Britain's team pursuit line-up who won the bronze medal at the 2026 UCI Track Cycling World Championships.

== Major results ==
=== Road ===
2013
6th Paris–Roubaix Juniors
2016
7th Kattekoers
10th GP Industria & Commercio
2017
1st Ryedale GP
4th Road race, UCI World Under-23 Championships
2019
1st Stage 1 Tour of the Reservoir
1st Sheffield, National Circuit Series
2022
8th Dorpenomloop Rucphen
2023
1st Circuit race, National Championships

=== Track ===
2014
National Championships

1st Team pursuit
1st Scratch

2015
National Championships

1st Team pursuit
1st Points race

2nd Six Days of London (with Chris Latham)
2016
UCI World Cup

1st Team pursuit, Glasgow
3rd Madison, Apeldoorn (with Mark Stewart)
3rd Team pursuit, Hong Kong

3rd Team pursuit, UEC European Championships
2017
UCI World Cup

1st Team pursuit, Manchester
2nd Omnium, Milton
3rd Madison, Milton (with Mark Stewart)

2018
1st Scratch, National Championships
2nd Team pursuit, Commonwealth Games
UCI World Cup

2nd Omnium, Saint-Quentin-en-Yvelines
2nd Team pursuit, Saint-Quentin-en-Yvelines
2nd Madison, Milton (with Mark Stewart)
2nd Madison, Berlin (with Mark Stewart)
2nd Scratch, Milton
3rd Team pursuit, Milton

3rd Madison, UEC European Championships (with Ethan Hayter)
2019
2nd Team pursuit, UCI World Championships
2nd Madison, UCI World Cup, Glasgow, (with Ethan Hayter)
UEC European Championships

3rd Team pursuit
3rd Omnium

2020
2nd Madison, UCI World Cup, Milton, (with Ethan Hayter)
3rd Scratch, UEC European Championships
2021
3rd Team pursuit, UCI World Championships
2022
UCI World Championships

1st Team pursuit
2nd Madison (with Ethan Hayter)

2nd Team pursuit, Commonwealth Games
UCI Nations Cup, Glasgow

1st Omnium
2nd Team pursuit

2023
UEC European Championships

1st Scratch
2nd Team pursuit

UCI Nations Cup

1st Team pursuit, Milton
3rd Team pursuit, Jakarta

2nd Madison, UCI World Championships (with Mark Stewart)
2024
1st Team pursuit, UEC European Championships
2nd Team pursuit, Olympic Games
2nd Team pursuit, UCI World Championships
2026
3rd Team pursuit, UCI World Championships
3rd Team pursuit, UEC European Championships
