= Roy Eefting =

Dutch cyclist (born 1989)

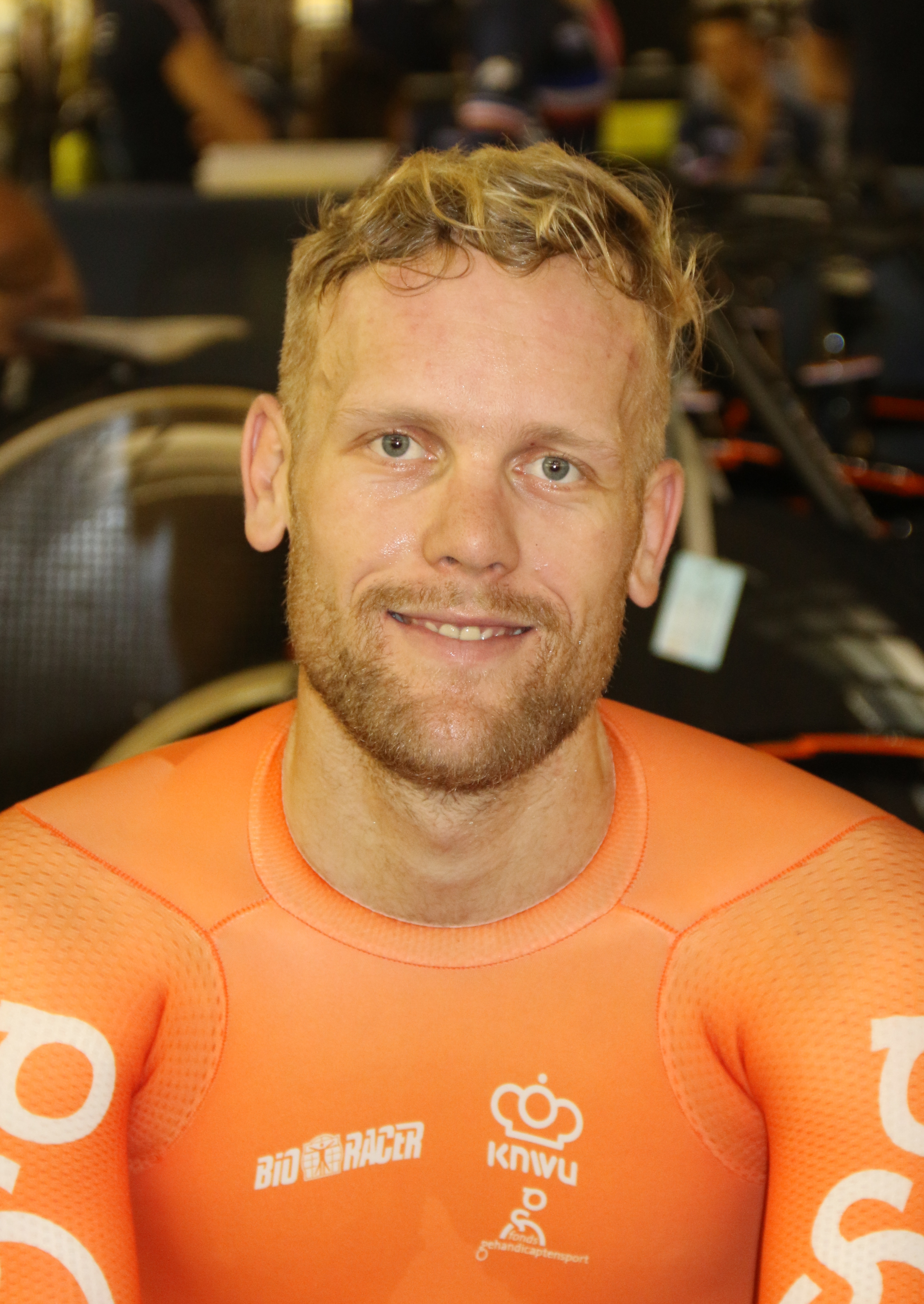
- Eefting in 2017

Personal information
- Full name: Roy Eefting-Bloem
- Born: 4 September 1989 (age 37) Harderwijk, Netherlands
- Height: 1.78 m (5 ft 10 in)
- Weight: 75 kg (165 lb)

Cycling career
- Sport: Cycling
- Current team: Maloja Pushbikers
- Disciplines: Road; Track
- Role: Rider
- Rider type: Sprinter (road)

Amateur teams
- 2008: Diamant Noorden Nederland
- 2009: Jong&Laan–De Peddelaars
- 2010–2011: Metec
- 2014: Belkin–De Jonge Renner

Professional teams
- 2012–2013: Koga Cycling Team
- 2015: Baby-Dump Cyclingteam
- 2018–2019: Memil–CCN Pro Cycling
- 2020: Team Sapura Cycling
- 2021: Ferei–CCN
- 2022: Allinq Continental Cycling Team
- 2023–: Maloja Pushbikers
Medal record
Men's track cycling
Representing the Netherlands
World Championships
Silver medal – second place	2019 Pruszków	Scratch
Bronze medal – third place	2020 Berlin	Points race
Bronze medal – third place	2022 Saint-Quentin-en-Yvelines	Scratch
European Championships
Silver medal – second place	2023 Grenchen	Scratch
Bronze medal – third place	2013 Apeldoorn	Team pursuit
Bronze medal – third place	2022 Munich	Scratch

Roy Eefting-Bloem (born 4 September 1989) is a Dutch road and track cyclist, who currently rides for UCI Continental team Maloja Pushbikers. He competed at the 2015 UCI Track Cycling World Championships.

He married Dutch runner Judith Bloem in the summer of 2021 and changed his full name to Roy Eefting-Bloem.

== Major results ==
=== Road ===
2007
3rd Omloop der Vlaamse Gewesten
2013
5th Destination Thy
2014
9th Ronde van Midden-Nederland
2017
9th ZODC Zuidenveld Tour
2018
Tour of Quanzhou Bay

1st Points classification
1st Stage 3

1st Stage 7 Tour of Poyang Lake
2019
Tour of Qinghai Lake

1st Stages 11 & 12

1st Stage 3 Tour of Xingtai
2nd Overall Tour of China I
2021
1st Omloop der Kempen
9th PWZ Zuidenveld Tour
2022
1st Stage 1a (TTT) Olympia's Tour
2023
1st Stage 1 Tour de Taiwan

=== Track ===
2011
2nd Omnium, UEC European Under-23 Championships
2012
3rd Scratch race, UCI World Cup, Glasgow
2013
3rd Team pursuit, UEC European Championships
2016
1st Omnium, National Championships
2017
National Championships

1st Scratch race
2nd Individual pursuit
3rd Omnium

2018
National Championships

2nd Omnium
3rd Scratch race

2019
UCI World Cup

1st Scratch race, Hong Kong
2nd Scratch race, Cambridge

National Championships

1st Points race
2nd Omnium

2nd Scratch race, UCI World Championships
2020
3rd Points race, UCI World Championships
2021
UCI Champions League

1st Scratch race, London
3rd Elimination race, London

2022
2nd Omnium, National Championships
3rd Scratch race, UCI World Championships
3rd Scratch race, UEC European Championships
2023
2nd Scratch race, UEC European Championships
