= Tim Wafler =

Austrian cyclist

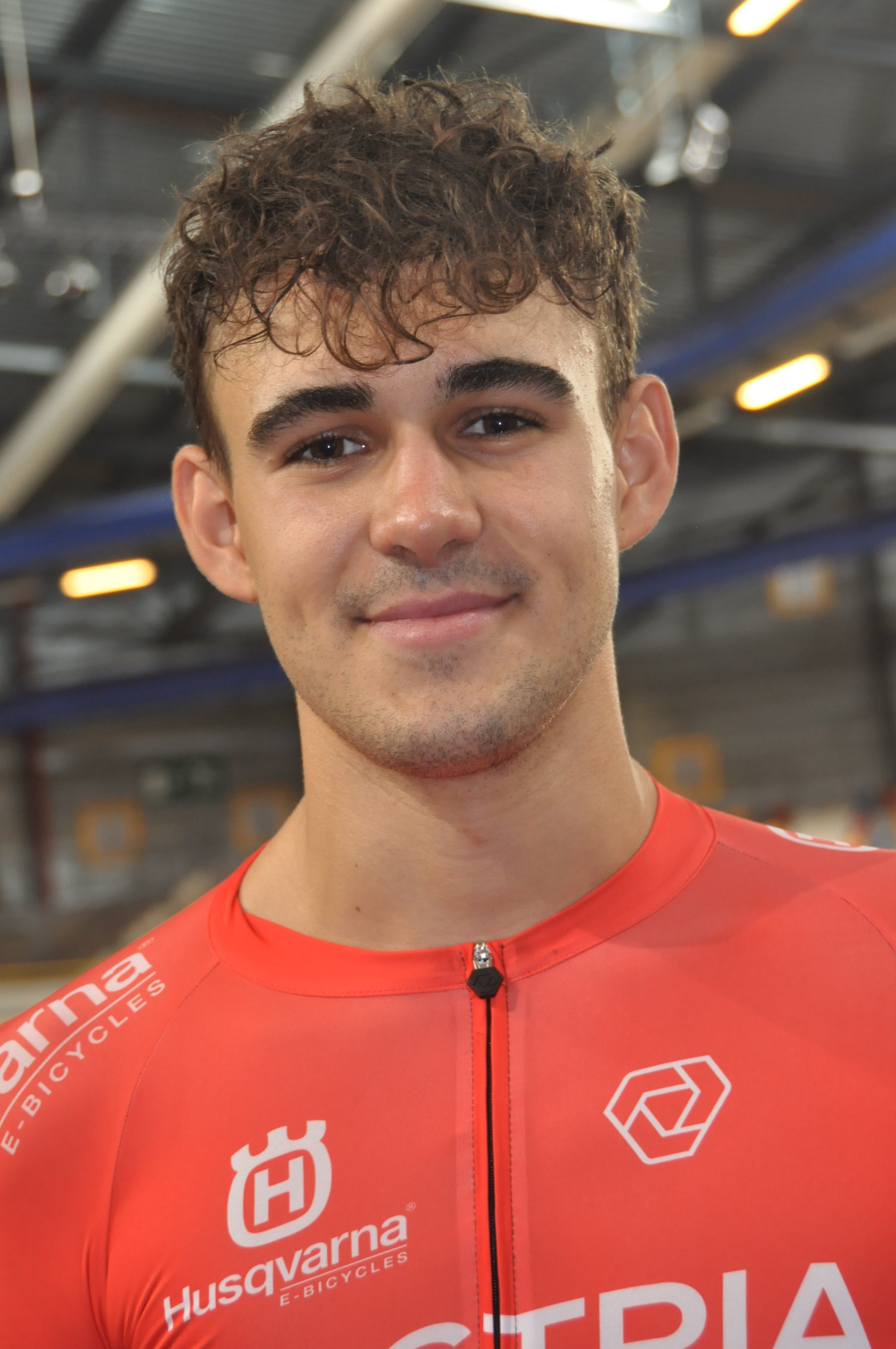
- Wafler in 2021

Personal information
- Born: 28 January 2002 (age 24) Kitzbühel, Austria
- Height: 1.87 m (6 ft 2 in)
- Weight: 78 kg (172 lb)

Cycling career
- Sport: Cycling
- Current team: Tirol KTM Cycling Team
- Disciplines: Road; Track
- Role: Rider

Professional team
- 2022–: Tirol KTM Cycling Team

Major wins
- One-day races and Classics National Road Race Championships (2025)
Medal record
Men's track cycling
Representing Austria
European Championships
Silver medal – second place	2024 Apeldoorn	Scratch
UEC European Under-23 Championships
Silver medal – second place	2022 Anadia	Scratch
Silver medal – second place	2023 Anadia	Omnium
UEC European Junior Championships
Silver medal – second place	2019 Ghent	Scratch

Tim Wafler (born 28 January 2002) is an Austrian cyclist, who currently rides for UCI Continental team Tirol KTM Cycling Team. He won a silver medal in the scratch race at the 2024 UEC European Track Championships.

== Major results ==
=== Track ===
2019
2nd Scratch, UEC European Junior Championships
2022
2nd Scratch, UEC European Under-23 Championships
2023
2nd Omnium, UEC European Under-23 Championships
2024
2nd Scratch, UEC European Championships

=== Road ===
2019
4th Time trial, National Junior Championships
2022
10th Overall Orlen Nations Grand Prix
2025 (1 pro win)
1st Road race, National Championships
