= Maxim Piskunov =

Russian cyclist (born 1997)

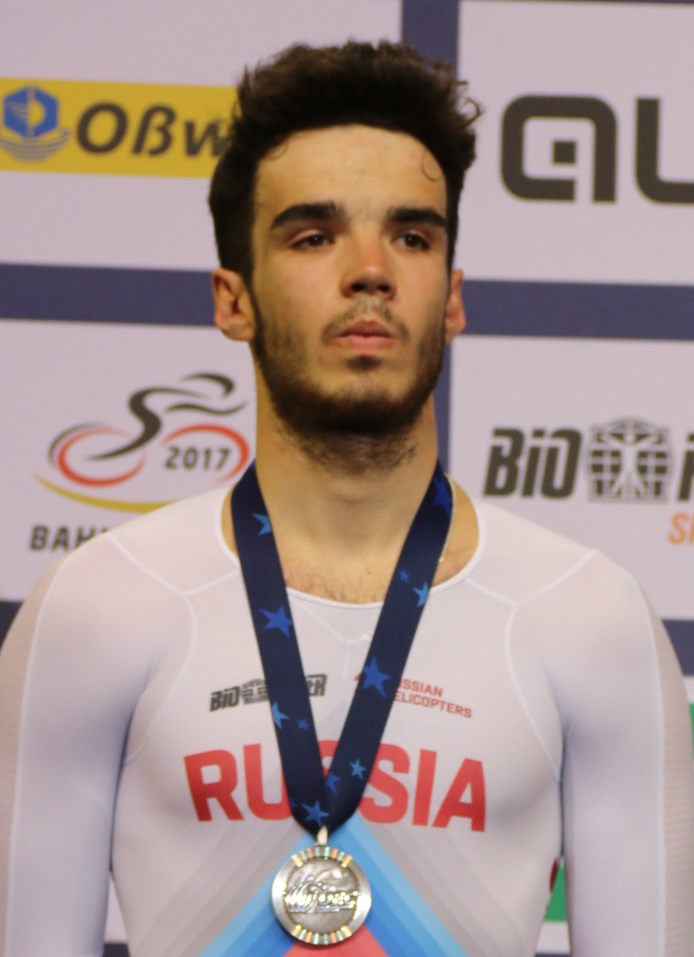
- Maxim Piskunov (2017)

Personal information
- Born: 10 October 1997 (age 29)

Cycling career
- Sport: Cycling
- Disciplines: Road, track

Amateur team
- 2017–: Marathon–Tula
Medal record
Men's track cycling
Representing Russia
European Championships
Silver medal – second place	2017 Berlin	Elimination

Maxim Piskunov (Russian: Максим Пискунов; born 10 October 1997) is a Russian road and track cyclist. He competed at the 2016 UEC European Track Championships in the elimination race event and scratch event.

== Major results ==
2015
UEC European Junior Track Championships

1st Team pursuit
1st Madison
2nd Scratch
2nd Kilo

1st Team pursuit, National Junior Track Championships
2016
1st Madison (with Sergey Rostovtsev), UEC European Under-23 Track Championships
1st Madison (with Sergey Rostovtsev), National Track Championships
2017
1st Madison (with Denis Nekrasov), National Track Championships
2nd Elimination, UEC European Track Championships
UEC European Under-23 Track Championships

2nd Madison
3rd Scratch
3rd Elimination

9th Overall Five Rings of Moscow
2018
1st Stage 4 Tour of Cartier
1st Stage 1 Vuelta a Costa Rica
2019
1st Stage 10 Tour du Maroc
1st Stage 4 Tour of Mersin
1st Stage 3 Five Rings of Moscow
3rd Minsk Cup
5th Grand Prix Minsk
2020
1st GP Antalya
8th Grand Prix Alanya
2021
6th GP Manavgat
