= Krisztián Lovassy =

Hungarian racing cyclist

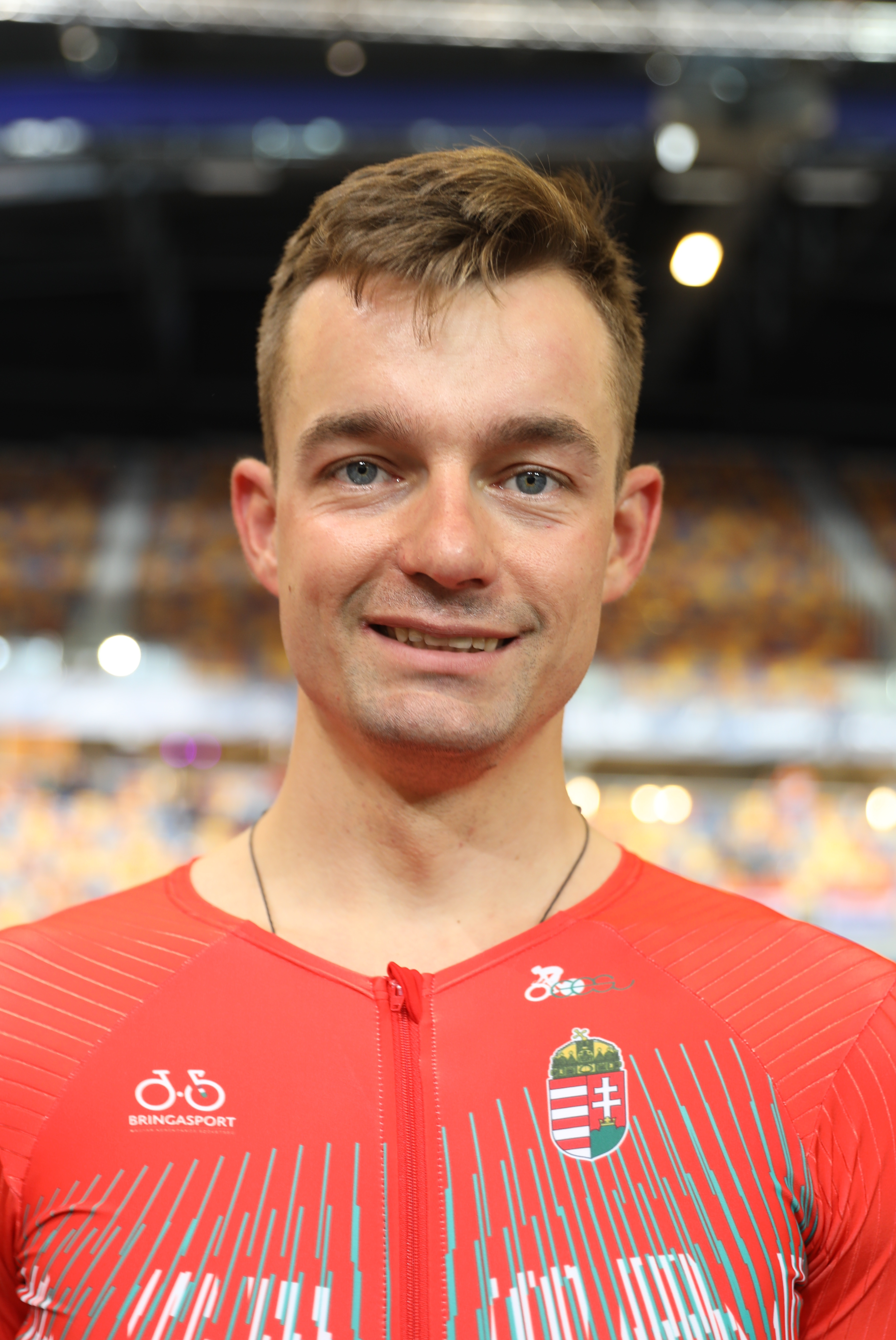
- Lovassy in 2019

Personal information
- Full name: Krisztián Lovassy
- Born: 23 June 1988 (age 38) Budapest, Hungary
- Height: 1.8 m (5 ft 11 in)
- Weight: 71 kg (157 lb)

Cycling career
- Sport: Cycling
- Current team: Epronex–Hungary Cycling Team
- Disciplines: Road; Track
- Role: Rider

Amateur teams
- 2008: World Cycling Centre
- 2019–: Epronex–BSS Oil Team

Professional teams
- 2009–2011: Betonexpressz 2000–Limonta
- 2012: Tuşnad Cycling Team
- 2013: Utensilnord Ora24.eu
- 2014: Team FixIT.no
- 2015–2017: Differdange–Losch
- 2018: Kőbánya Cycling Team
Medal record
Representing Hungary
Men's track cycling
European Championships
Silver medal – second place	2017 Berlin	Scratch race

Krisztián Lovassy (born 23 June 1988) is a Hungarian road bicycle racer, who currently rides for Hungarian amateur team Epronex–Hungary Cycling Team.

== Career ==
Born in Budapest, Lovassy competed at the 2012 Summer Olympics in the Men's road race, but failed to finish. At the 2017 UEC European Track Championships held in Berlin he earned a silver medal in the men's scratch race.

== Major results ==
=== Road ===
2009
3rd Banja Luka–Belgrade I
5th Overall Grand Prix Cycliste de Gemenc

1st Stage 1

2010
2nd Time trial, National Road Championships
8th Central European Tour Gyomaendröd GP
2011
1st Banja Luka–Belgrade I
2nd Road race, National Road Championships
3rd GP Betonexpressz 2000
4th Central European Tour Budapest GP
7th Overall Tour of Romania

1st Stage 6

7th Tour of Vojvodina II
2012
1st Central European Tour Miskolc GP
2nd Central European Tour Budapest GP
3rd Road race, National Road Championships
3rd Grand Prix Dobrich II
8th Gran Premio della Costa Etruschi
10th Grand Prix Dobrich I
10th Banja Luka–Belgrade I
2013
1st Road race, National Road Championships
1st Central European Tour Budapest GP
5th Trofej Umag
5th Central European Tour Košice–Miskolc
2014
National Road Championships

2nd Time trial
3rd Road race

7th Central European Tour Košice–Miskolc
2015
1st Time trial, National Road Championships
7th Duo Normand (with Gediminas Kaupas)
8th Overall Tour de Hongrie
10th Visegrad 4 Bicycle Race – GP Slovakia
2016
2nd Road race, National Road Championships
2017
1st Road race, National Road Championships
10th Duo Normand (with Jan Petelin)
2019
1st Stage 3a Tour de Hongrie

=== Track ===
2017
1st Kilo, National Championships
2nd Scratch, UEC European Championships
2018
National Championships

1st Omnium
1st Scratch
1st Points race

2019
National Championships

1st Omnium
1st Scratch

2020
National Championships

1st Omnium
1st Scratch
1st Individual pursuit
1st Points race
1st Team sprint
