= Roman Gladysh =

Ukrainian cyclist (born 1995)

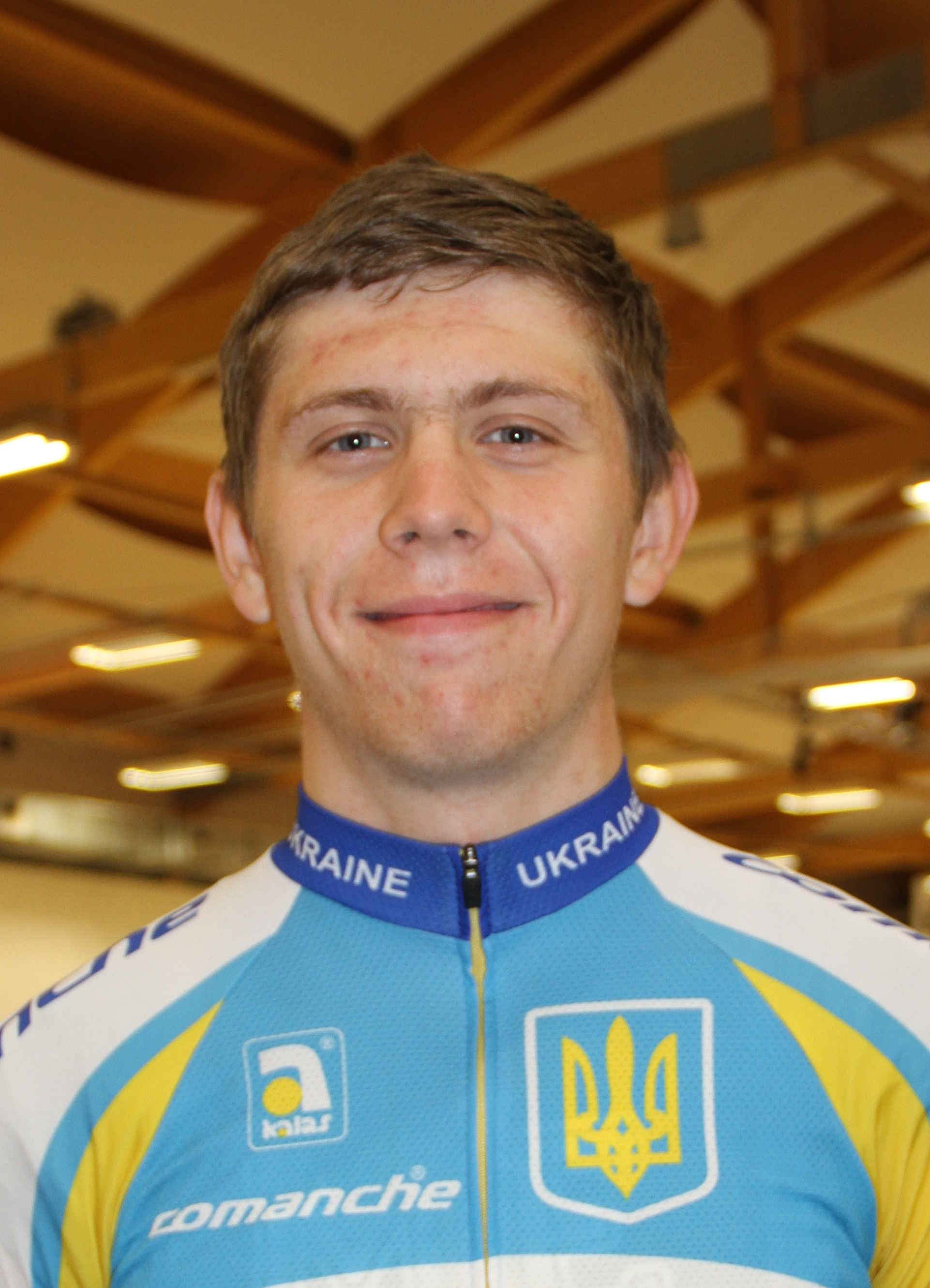

Personal information
- Born: 12 October 1995 (age 31)

Cycling career
- Sport: Cycling
- Discipline: Track cycling
- Role: Rider
- Rider type: Scratch madison team pursuit
Medal record
Men's track cycling
Representing Ukraine
European Championships
Gold medal – first place	2018 Glasgow	Scratch
Silver medal – second place	2020 Plovdiv	Scratch
Bronze medal – third place	2017 Berlin	Scratch
U23 & Junior European Championships
Silver medal – second place	2013 Anadia	Junior Madison
Bronze medal – third place	2017 Sangalhos	U23 Madison

Roman Gladysh (born 12 October 1995) is a Ukrainian male track cyclist. He competed in the scratch event and madison event at the 2015 UCI Track Cycling World Championships. His biggest success up to date is European champion title which he obtained at the 2018 UEC European Track Championships in scratch race.

== Major results ==
2020
2nd Scratch, UEC European Track Championships
