= UEC European Track Championships – Men's team pursuit =

UEC European Champion jersey

The Men's team pursuit at the European Track Championships was first competed in 2010 in Poland. It has formed a part of each championship since. Great Britain, the double Olympic champions, dominated the event in its early years, winning all of the first five occasions they entered. A record sixth title was confirmed in 2024,

Andy Tennant was ever present in each success of the British team before 2024, and as a result is the most successful individual rider in the event, with five gold medals.Thomas Denis of France is the most successful non-British rider, with three gold medals.

== Format ==
Until 2014, the team pursuit consisted of two rounds; a qualifying round, followed by a final for the fastest two qualifiers, and the race for the bronze medal for the third and fourth fastest qualifiers. In 2014, a third intermediate round was added: two semifinals consisting of the top four qualifiers to decide the gold medal finalists, and two bronze medal raceoffs for teams placed fifth to eighth which, together with the times of the losing gold race semifinalists, decided the bronze medal finalists.

In that first amended event in 2014, France failed to make the 'gold medal semifinals', but having reached the bronze medal race-offs as the sixth placed team, raced a quicker time than Switzerland, one of the losing semifinalists, to reach the Bronze medal final; they lost the Bronze medal final to the other losing semifinalist, Russia.

== Medalists ==
Championships	Gold	Silver	Bronze
2010 Pruszków	Great Britain; Steven Burke; Ed Clancy; Jason Queally; Andy Tennant	Russia; Evgeny Kovalev; Ivan Kovalev; Alexei Markov; Alexander Serov	Netherlands; Levi Heimans; Arno Van Der Zwet; Tim Veldt; Sipke Zijlstra
2011 Apeldoorn	Great Britain; Steven Burke; Ed Clancy; Peter Kennaugh; Andy Tennant	Denmark; Michael Mørkøv; Casper Folsach; Lasse Norman Hansen; Rasmus Quaade	Russia; Valery Kaykov; Evgeny Kovalev; Ivan Kovalev; Victor Manakov
2012 Panevėžys	Russia; Artur Ershov; Alexei Markov; Alexander Serov; Valery Kaykov	Germany; Lucas Liss; Henning Bommel; Theo Reinhardt; Maximilian Beyer	Italy; Elia Viviani; Michele Scartezzini; Liam Bertazzo; Ignazio Moser
2013 Apeldoorn	Great Britain; Owain Doull; Steven Burke; Ed Clancy; Andy Tennant	Russia; Artur Ershov; Ivan Kovalev; Evgeny Kovalev; Alexander Serov	(Netherlands) Netherlands; Tim Veldt; Dion Beukeboom; Roy Eefting; Jenning Huizenga
2014 Guadeloupe	Great Britain; Owain Doull; Jonathan Dibben; Ed Clancy; Andy Tennant	Germany; Henning Bommel; Theo Reinhardt; Nils Schomber; Kersten Thiele; Leon Rohde	Russia; Alexey Kurbatov; Evgeny Kovalev; Ivan Kovalev; Alexander Serov; Artur Ershov
2015 Grenchen	Great Britain; Owain Doull; Jonathan Dibben; Andy Tennant; Bradley Wiggins; Steven Burke; Matthew Gibson	Switzerland; Silvan Dillier; Stefan Küng; Frank Pasche; Théry Schir	Denmark; Daniel Hartvig; Casper Pedersen; Lasse Norman Hansen; Rasmus Quaade; Mathias Møller Nielsen
2016 Saint-Quentin-en-Yvelines	France; Thomas Denis; Corentin Ermenault; Florian Maitre; Sylvain Chavanel; Benjamin Thomas	Italy; Filippo Ganna; Simone Consonni; Francesco Lamon; Michele Scartezzini; Liam Bertazzo	Great Britain; Matthew Bostock; Oliver Wood; Kian Emadi Coffin; Mark Stewart; Steven Burke
2017 Berlin	France; Thomas Denis; Corentin Ermenault; Florian Maitre; Louis Pijourlet	Italy; Filippo Ganna; Simone Consonni; Francesco Lamon; Liam Bertazzo	Russia; Alexey Kurbatov; Alexander Evtushenko; Mamyr Stash; Dmitri Sokolov
2018 Glasgow	Italy; Elia Viviani; Liam Bertazzo; Filippo Ganna; Francesco Lamon	Switzerland; Claudio Imhof; Cyrille Thièry; Stefan Bissegger; Frank Pasche	Great Britain; Ethan Hayter; Steven Burke; Kian Emadi; Charlie Tanfield
2019 Apeldoorn	Denmark; Lasse Norman Hansen; Rasmus Pedersen; Frederik Madsen; Julius Johansen	Italy; Michele Scartezzini; Davide Plebani; Filippo Ganna; Francesco Lamon	Great Britain; Ethan Hayter; Edward Clancy; Oliver Wood; Charlie Tanfield
2020 Plovdiv	Russia; Alexander Dubchenko; Lev Gonov; Nikita Bersenev; Alexander Evtushenko	Italy; Francesco Lamon; Stefano Moro; Jonathan Milan; Gidas Umbri	Switzerland; Claudio Imhof; Simon Vitzthum; Lukas Rüegg; Dominik Bieler
2021 Grenchen	Denmark; Matias Malmberg; Rasmus Pedersen; Tobias Hansen; Carl-Frederik Bévort	Switzerland; Claudio Imhof; Simon Vitzthum; Valère Thiébaud; Alex Vogel	Great Britain; Rhys Britton; William Tidball; Oliver Wood; Charlie Tanfield
2022 Munich	France; Thomas Denis; Quentin Lafargue; Valentin Tabellion; Benjamin Thomas; Thomas Boudat	Denmark; Robin Juel Skivild; Rasmus Pedersen; Tobias Hansen; Carl-Frederik Bévort	Great Britain; Rhys Britton; Kian Emadi; Oliver Wood; Charlie Tanfield; William Tidball
2023 Grenchen	Italy; Filippo Ganna; Francesco Lamon; Jonathan Milan; Manlio Moro; Simone Consonni	Great Britain; Daniel Bigham; Charlie Tanfield; Ethan Vernon; Oliver Wood	France; Thomas Denis; Corentin Ermenault; Quentin Lafargue; Benjamin Thomas; Adrien Garel
2024 Apeldoorn	Great Britain; Daniel Bigham; Ethan Hayter; Charlie Tanfield; Ethan Vernon; Oliver Wood	Denmark; Carl-Frederik Bévort; Tobias Hansen; Niklas Larsen; Rasmus Pedersen; Frederik Rodenberg	Italy; Davide Boscaro; Simone Consonni; Francesco Lamon; Jonathan Milan
2025 Heusden-Zolder	Denmark; Tobias Hansen; Niklas Larsen; Lasse Norman Leth; Robin Juel Skivild	Great Britain; Rhys Britton; Josh Charlton; Michael Gill; Noah Hobbs; William Tidball	Switzerland; Noah Bögli; Mats Poot; Pascal Tappeiner; Alex Vogel
2026 Konya	Denmark; Tobias Hansen; Lasse Norman Leth; Rasmus Pedersen; Frederik Rodenberg; Robin Juel Skivild	Switzerland; Noah Bögli; Luca Bühlmann; Mats Poot; Alex Vogel; Pascal Tappeiner	United Kingdom; Matthew Bostock; Noah Hobbs; William Tidball; Oliver Wood; Ben Wiggins
