= List of Swiss records in track cycling =

The following are the national records in track cycling in Switzerland maintained by Swiss Cycling.

== Men ==
Key to tables: Awaiting ratification Record not kept by Swiss Cycling Not ratified or later rescinded by the Swiss Cycling

Event	Record	Athlete	Date	Meet	Place	Ref
Flying 200m time trial	10.225	Mats Poot	17 June 2025		Zurich, Switzerland	
Flying 500m time trial	28.163	Heinz Isler	9 July 1979		Zurich, Switzerland	
1km time trial	1:02.654	Mats Poot	2 September 2025		Zurich, Switzerland	
4000m individual pursuit	4:07.032	Pascal Tappeiner	3 February 2026	European Championships	Konya, Turkey	
4000m team pursuit	3:44.754	Alex Vogel; Pascal Tappeiner; Mats Poot; Noah Bögli	2 February 2026	European Championships	Konya, Turkey	
Hour record	53.451 km	Valère Thiébaud	23 August 2024		Grenchen, Switzerland	

== Women ==
Event	Record	Athlete	Date	Meet	Place	Ref
Flying 200m time trial	11.922	Pascale Schnider	10 June 2011		Aigle, Switzerland	
250m time trial (standing start)	22.234	Virginie Perizzolo Pointet	19 October 2016	European Championships	Saint-Quentin-en-Yvelines, France	
Flying 500m time trial	36.278	Andrea Wölfer	26 August 2003		Zurich, Switzerland	
500m time trial	37.302	Pascale Schnider	11 June 2010		Aigle, Switzerland	
500m time trial	37.237	Aline Seitz	10 July 2021	Nations Cup	Saint Petersburg, Russia	
1km time trial						
3000m individual pursuit	3:33.242	Fabienne Buri	15 October 2022	World Championships	Saint-Quentin-en-Yvelines, France	
4000m individual pursuit	4:32.764	Jasmin Liechti	4 February 2026	European Championships	Konya, Turkey	
3000m team pursuit	3:44.989	Doris Schweizer; Monia Turin; Andrea Wölfer	4 September 2008	European U23 Championships	Pruszków, Poland	
4000m team pursuit	4:12.094	Michelle Andres; Aline Seitz; Lorena Leu; Jasmin Liechti	2 February 2026	European Championships	Konya, Turkey	
Hour record	43.347 km	Barbara Ganz	25 November 1991		Zurich, Switzerland	
