= 2024 UEC European Track Championships – Men's team pursuit =

Men's team pursuit at the 2024 UEC European Track Championships
- Venue: Omnisport Apeldoorn, Apeldoorn
- Date: 10–11 January
- Competitors: 41 from 9 nations
- Winning time: 3:45.218

Medalists
gold medal	Daniel Bigham; Ethan Hayter; Charlie Tanfield; Ethan Vernon; Oliver Wood	Great Britain
silver medal	Carl-Frederik Bévort; Tobias Hansen; Niklas Larsen; Rasmus Pedersen; Frederik Rodenberg	Denmark
bronze medal	Davide Boscaro; Simone Consonni; Francesco Lamon; Jonathan Milan	Italy

The men's team pursuit competition at the 2024 UEC European Track Championships was held on 10 and 11 January 2024.

== Results ==
=== Qualifying ===
The eight fastest teams advanced to the first round.

Rank	Nation	Time	Behind	Notes
1	Denmark; Carl-Frederik Bévort; Tobias Hansen; Frederik Rodenberg; Rasmus Pedersen	3:49.088		Q
2	Great Britain; Daniel Bigham; Ethan Hayter; Ethan Vernon; Oliver Wood	3:49.722	+0.634	Q
3	Italy; Davide Boscaro; Simone Consonni; Francesco Lamon; Jonathan Milan	3:52.940	+3.852	Q
4	Germany; Tobias Buck-Gramcko; Felix Groß; Nicolas Heinrich; Tim Torn Teutenberg	3:54.680	+5.592	Q
5	Belgium; Lindsay De Vylder; Tuur Dens; Gianluca Pollefliet; Noah Vandenbranden	3:54.942	+5.854	q
6	France; Thomas Boudat; Thomas Denis; Oscar Nilsson-Julien; Valentin Tabellion	3:56.985	+7.897	q
7	Switzerland; Luca Bühlmann; Noah Bögli; Pascal Tappeiner; Valère Thiébaud	4:01.576	+12.488	q
8	Spain; Francesc Bennassar; Joan Martí Bennassar; Beñat Garaiar; Erik Martorell	4:03.978	+14.890	q
9	Ukraine; Heorhii Antonenko; Vitaliy Hryniv; Valentyn Kabashnyi; Daniil Yakovlev	4:07.152	+18.064	

=== First round ===
First round heats were held as follows:
Heat 1: 6th v 7th fastest
Heat 2: 5th v 8th fastest
Heat 3: 2nd v 3rd fastest
Heat 4: 1st v 4th fastest

The winners of heats 3 and 4 proceeded to the gold medal race. The remaining six teams were ranked on time, from which the top two proceeded to the bronze medal race.

Heat	Rank	Nation	Time	Notes
1	1	France; Thomas Boudat; Thomas Denis; Corentin Ermenault; Valentin Tabellion	3:53.892	
1	2	Switzerland; Luca Bühlmann; Noah Bögli; Pascal Tappeiner; Valère Thiébaud	4:04.768	
2	1	Belgium; Lindsay De Vylder; Tuur Dens; Gianluca Pollefliet; Noah Vandenbranden	3:53.106	
2	2	Spain; Francesc Bennassar; Beñat Garaiar; Erik Martorell; Álvaro Navas	4:01.667	
3	1	Great Britain; Daniel Bigham; Ethan Hayter; Ethan Vernon; Oliver Wood	3:48.524	QG
3	2	Italy; Davide Boscaro; Simone Consonni; Francesco Lamon; Jonathan Milan	3:51.091	QB
4	1	Denmark; Carl-Frederik Bévort; Niklas Larsen; Frederik Rodenberg; Rasmus Pedersen	3:44.923	QG
4	2	Germany; Tobias Buck-Gramcko; Felix Groß; Nicolas Heinrich; Theo Reinhardt	3:51.337	QB

=== Finals ===
Rank	Nation	Time	Behind	Notes
Gold medal final
1st place, gold medalist(s)	Great Britain; Daniel Bigham; Ethan Hayter; Charlie Tanfield; Ethan Vernon	3:45.218		
2nd place, silver medalist(s)	Denmark; Carl-Frederik Bévort; Tobias Hansen; Niklas Larsen; Frederik Rodenberg; Rasmus Pedersen	3:46.372	+1.154	
Bronze medal final
3rd place, bronze medalist(s)	Italy; Davide Boscaro; Simone Consonni; Francesco Lamon; Jonathan Milan	3:49.974		
4	Germany; Tobias Buck-Gramcko; Felix Groß; Nicolas Heinrich; Tim Torn Teutenberg	3:52.108	+2.134	
