= 2025 UEC European Track Championships – Men's team pursuit =

Men's team pursuit at the 2025 UEC European Track Championships
- Venue: Velodroom Limburg, Heusden-Zolder
- Date: 12–13 February
- Competitors: 39 from 9 nations
- Winning time: 3:51.113

Medalists
gold medal	Tobias Hansen; Niklas Larsen; Lasse Norman Leth; Robin Juel Skivild	Denmark
silver medal	Rhys Britton; Josh Charlton; Michael Gill; Noah Hobbs; William Tidball	Great Britain
bronze medal	Noah Bögli; Mats Poot; Pascal Tappeiner; Alex Vogel	Switzerland

The men's team pursuit competition at the 2025 UEC European Track Championships was held on 12 and 13 February 2025.

== Results ==
=== Qualifying ===
The eight fastest teams advanced to the first round.

Rank	Nation	Time	Behind	Notes
1	Denmark; Tobias Hansen; Niklas Larsen; Lasse Norman Leth; Robin Juel Skivild	3:50.991		Q
2	Great Britain; Rhys Britton; Josh Charlton; Michael Gill; Noah Hobbs	3:51.578	+0.587	Q
3	Switzerland; Noah Bögli; Mats Poot; Pascal Tappeiner; Alex Vogel	3:54.205	+3.214	Q
4	Italy; Davide Boscaro; Renato Favero; Niccolò Galli; Francesco Lamon	3:55.760	+4.769	Q
5	Poland; Alan Banaszek; Kacper Majewski; Piotr Maślak; Bartosz Rudyk	3:57.261	+6.270	q
6	Belgium; Thibault Bernard; Tom Crabbe; Renzo Raes; Yoran Van Gucht	3:58.322	+7.331	q
7	Spain; Joan Martí Bennassar; Beñat Garaiar; Erik Martorell; Álvaro Navas	4:03.368	+12.377	q
8	France; Camille Charret; Emmanuel Houcou; Ellande Larronde; Lucas Menanteau	4:07.547	+16.556	q
9	Ukraine; Heorhii Chyzhykov; Roman Gladysh; Danylo Kozoriz; Daniil Yakovlev	4:11.318	+20.327	

=== First round ===
First round heats were held as follows:
Heat 1: 6th v 7th fastest
Heat 2: 5th v 8th fastest
Heat 3: 2nd v 3rd fastest
Heat 4: 1st v 4th fastest

The winners of heats 3 and 4 proceeded to the gold medal race. The remaining six teams were ranked on time, from which the top two proceeded to the bronze medal race.

Heat	Rank	Nation	Time	Notes
1	1	Spain; Joan Martí Bennassar; Beñat Garaiar; Erik Martorell; Álvaro Navas	4:02.348	
1	2	Belgium; Thibault Bernard; Tom Crabbe; Yoran Van Gucht; Noah Vandenbranden	DNF	
2	1	Poland; Alan Banaszek; Kacper Majewski; Piotr Maślak; Bartosz Rudyk	3:56.979	
2	2	France; Camille Charret; Emmanuel Houcou; Ellande Larronde; Lucas Menanteau	3:58.248	
3	1	Great Britain; Josh Charlton; Michael Gill; Alfred Hobbs; William Tidball	3:49.813	QG
3	2	Switzerland; Noah Bögli; Mats Poot; Pascal Tappeiner; Alex Vogel	3:53.625	QB
4	1	Denmark; Tobias Hansen; Niklas Larsen; Lasse Norman Leth; Robin Juel Skivild	3:47.758	QG
4	2	Italy; Davide Boscaro; Renato Favero; Niccolò Galli; Francesco Lamon	3:54.022	QB

=== Finals ===
Rank	Nation	Time	Behind	Notes
Gold medal final
1st place, gold medalist(s)	Denmark; Tobias Hansen; Niklas Larsen; Lasse Norman Leth; Robin Juel Skivild	3:51.113		
2nd place, silver medalist(s)	Great Britain; Rhys Britton; Josh Charlton; Michael Gill; Noah Hobbs	3:51.832	+0.719	
Bronze medal final
3rd place, bronze medalist(s)	Switzerland; Noah Bögli; Mats Poot; Pascal Tappeiner; Alex Vogel	3:53.467		
4	Italy; Davide Boscaro; Renato Favero; Etienne Grimod; Francesco Lamon	3:54.169	+0.702	
