= 2026 UEC European Track Championships – Men's individual pursuit =

Men's individual pursuit at the 2026 UEC Track Elite European Championships
- Venue: Konya Velodrome, Konya
- Date: 3 February
- Competitors: 21
- Winning time: 4:03.491

Medalists
gold medal	Lev Gonov
silver medal	Robin Juel Skivild	Denmark
bronze medal	Renato Favero	Italy

The men's individual pursuit competition at the 2026 UEC European Track Championships was held on 3 February 2026.

== Results ==
=== Qualifying ===
The first two racers raced for gold, the third and fourth fastest rider raced for the bronze medal.

Rank	Name	Nation	Time	Behind	Notes
1	Robin Juel Skivild	Denmark	4:01.365		QG
2	Lev Gonov	Individual Neutral Athletes	4:02.281	+0.916	QG
3	Renato Favero	Italy	4:02.391	+1.026	QB
4	Matthew Bostock	Great Britain	4:03.745	+2.380	QB
5	Conrad Haugsted	Denmark	4:04.288	+2.923	
6	Etienne Grimod	Italy	4:04.545	+3.180	
7	Mathieu Dupé	France	4:05.364	+3.999	
8	Eñaut Urkaregi	Spain	4:06.718	+5.353	
9	Pascal Tappeiner	Switzerland	4:07.032	+5.667	
10	Tim Shoreman	Great Britain	4:07.231	+5.866	
11	Luca Bühlmann	Switzerland	4:08.549	+7.184	
12	Ben Jochum	Germany	4:08.566	+7.201	
13	Benjamin Boos	Germany	4:10.109	+8.744	
14	Joan Martí Bennassar	Spain	4:10.862	+9.497	
15	Thibaut Bernard	Belgium	4:15.458	+14.093	
16	Matyáš Koblížek	Czech Republic	4:16.882	+15.517	
17	Vladyslav Holiak	Ukraine	4:19.313	+17.948	
18	Ellande Larronde	France	4:21.381	+20.016	
19	Vitālijs Korņilovs	Latvia	4:22.577	+21.212	
20	Charel Meyers	Luxembourg	4:25.874	+24.509	
21	Mihnea Harasim	Romania	4:34.033	+32.668	

=== Finals ===
Rank	Name	Nation	Time	Behind	Notes
Gold medal final
1st place, gold medalist(s)	Lev Gonov	Individual Neutral Athletes	4:03.491		
2nd place, silver medalist(s)	Robin Juel Skivild	Denmark	4:05.577	+2.086	
Bronze medal final
3rd place, bronze medalist(s)	Renato Favero	Italy	4:01.749		
4	Matthew Bostock	Great Britain	OVL		
