= 2025 UEC European Track Championships – Men's omnium =

Men's omnium at the 2025 UEC European Track Championships
- Venue: Velodroom Limburg, Heusden-Zolder
- Date: 15 February
- Competitors: 21 from 21 nations
- Winning points: 167

Medalists
gold medal	Tim Torn Teutenberg	Germany
silver medal	Niklas Larsen	Denmark
bronze medal	Philip Heijnen	Netherlands

The men's omnium competition at the 2025 UEC European Track Championships was held on 15 February 2025.

== Results ==
=== Scratch race ===
Rank	Name	Nation	Laps down	Event points
1	Tim Torn Teutenberg	Germany		40
2	Niklas Larsen	Denmark		38
3	Ellande Larronde	France		36
4	Adam Křenek	Czech Republic		34
5	Alex Vogel	Switzerland		32
6	Karsten Larsen Feldmann	Norway		30
7	Philip Heijnen	Netherlands		28
8	Lindsay De Vylder	Belgium		26
9	Alan Banaszek	Poland		24
10	Raphael Kokas	Austria		22
11	Ivo Oliveira	Portugal		20
12	Ilya Savekin	Individual Neutral Athletes		18
13	Elia Viviani	Italy		16
14	Noah Hobbs	Great Britain		14
15	Bertold Drijver	Hungary		12
16	Daniil Yakovlev	Ukraine		10
17	Žak Eržen	Slovenia		8
18	Joan Roca	Spain		6
19	Martin Chren	Slovakia		4
20	Daniel Crista	Romania	–1	2
21	Ramazan Yılmaz	Turkey	–1	1

=== Tempo race ===
Rank	Name	Nation	Points in race	Event points
1	Ilya Savekin	Individual Neutral Athletes	29	40
2	Tim Torn Teutenberg	Germany	26	38
3	Philip Heijnen	Netherlands	24	36
4	Lindsay De Vylder	Belgium	22	34
5	Elia Viviani	Italy	22	32
6	Adam Křenek	Czech Republic	21	30
7	Niklas Larsen	Denmark	21	28
8	Noah Hobbs	Great Britain	21	26
9	Bertold Drijver	Hungary	21	24
10	Ellande Larronde	France	21	22
11	Žak Eržen	Slovenia	21	20
12	Alan Banaszek	Poland	2	18
13	Ivo Oliveira	Portugal	2	16
14	Karsten Larsen Feldmann	Norway	1	14
15	Joan Roca	Spain	1	12
16	Ramazan Yılmaz	Turkey	1	10
17	Daniel Crista	Romania	0	8
18	Daniil Yakovlev	Ukraine	0	6
19	Raphael Kokas	Austria	0	4
20	Martin Chren	Slovakia	0	2
21	Alex Vogel	Switzerland	0	1

=== Elimination race ===
Rank	Name	Nation	Event points
1	Tim Torn Teutenberg	Germany	40
2	Elia Viviani	Italy	38
3	Niklas Larsen	Denmark	36
4	Philip Heijnen	Netherlands	34
5	Noah Hobbs	Great Britain	32
6	Alex Vogel	Switzerland	30
7	Joan Roca	Spain	28
8	Alan Banaszek	Poland	26
9	Ilya Savekin	Individual Neutral Athletes	24
10	Lindsay De Vylder	Belgium	22
11	Adam Křenek	Czech Republic	20
12	Bertold Drijver	Hungary	18
13	Karsten Larsen Feldmann	Norway	16
14	Ivo Oliveira	Portugal	14
15	Raphael Kokas	Austria	12
16	Ramazan Yılmaz	Turkey	10
17	Žak Eržen	Slovenia	8
18	Ellande Larronde	France	6
19	Daniil Yakovlev	Ukraine	4
20	Martin Chren	Slovakia	2
21	Daniel Crista	Romania	1

=== Points race ===
Overall rank	Name	Nation	Scratch race	Tempo race	Elim. race	Subtotal	Lap points	Sprint points	Finish order	Total points
1st place, gold medalist(s)	Tim Torn Teutenberg	Germany	40	38	40	118	40	9	5	167
2nd place, silver medalist(s)	Niklas Larsen	Denmark	38	28	36	102	40	23	1	165
3rd place, bronze medalist(s)	Philip Heijnen	Netherlands	28	36	34	98	40	9	17	147
4	Lindsay De Vylder	Belgium	26	34	22	82	40	13	3	135
5	Ivo Oliveira	Portugal	20	16	14	50	60	8	21	118
6	Ilya Savekin	Individual Neutral Athletes	18	40	24	82	20	7	6	109
7	Elia Viviani	Italy	16	32	38	86	20	3	13	109
8	Adam Křenek	Czech Republic	34	30	20	84	20	0	18	104
9	Noah Hobbs	Great Britain	14	26	32	72	20	6	7	98
10	Alan Banaszek	Poland	24	18	26	68	20	2	19	90
11	Alex Vogel	Switzerland	32	1	30	63	0	3	20	66
12	Ellande Larronde	France	36	22	6	64	–20	13	9	57
13	Bertold Drijver	Hungary	12	24	18	54	0	0	16	54
14	Joan Roca	Spain	6	12	28	46	0	6	2	52
15	Karsten Larsen Feldmann	Norway	30	14	16	60	–20	11	4	51
16	Raphael Kokas	Austria	22	4	12	38	0	2	8	40
17	Martin Chren	Slovakia	4	2	2	8	0	1	14	29
18	Daniil Yakovlev	Ukraine	10	6	4	20	0	5	12	25
19	Žak Eržen	Slovenia	8	20	8	36	–20	0	10	16
20	Daniel Crista	Romania	2	8	1	11	0	0	15	11
21	Ramazan Yılmaz	Turkey	1	10	10	21	–20	0	11	1
