= 2024 UEC European Track Championships – Men's omnium =

Men's omnium at the 2024 UEC European Track Championships
- Venue: Apeldoorn, Netherlands
- Date: 13 January
- Competitors: 22 from 22 nations

Medalists
gold medal	Ethan Hayter	Great Britain
silver medal	Niklas Larsen	Denmark
bronze medal	Fabio Van den Bossche	Belgium

The men's omnium competition at the 2024 UEC European Track Championships was held on 13 January 2024.

== Results ==
=== Scratch race ===
Rank	Name	Nation	Laps down	Event points
1	Yanne Dorenbos	Netherlands		40
2	Ethan Hayter	Great Britain		38
3	Simone Consonni	Italy		36
4	Niklas Larsen	Denmark		34
5	Fabio Van den Bossche	Belgium		32
6	Tim Torn Teutenberg	Germany	–1	30
7	Albert Torres	Spain	–1	28
8	Alan Banaszek	Poland	–1	26
9	Rui Oliveira	Portugal	–1	24
10	Raphael Kokas	Austria	–1	22
11	Benjamin Thomas	France	–1	20
12	Radovan Štec	Czech Republic	–1	18
13	Daniel Crista	Romania	–1	16
14	Rotem Tene	Israel	–1	14
15	Martin Chren	Slovakia	–1	12
16	Bertold Drijver	Hungary	–1	10
17	Iver Knotten	Norway	–1	8
18	George Nemilostivijs	Latvia	–2	6
19	Valentyn Kabashnyi	Ukraine	–2	4
20	Alex Vogel	Switzerland	–2	2
21	Gustav Johansson	Sweden	–2	1
	Georgios Boutopoulos	Greece	DNF	

=== Tempo race ===
Rank	Name	Nation	Points in race	Event points
1	Fabio Van den Bossche	Belgium	24	40
2	Yanne Dorenbos	Netherlands	22	38
3	Tim Torn Teutenberg	Germany	12	36
4	Raphael Kokas	Austria	5	34
5	Ethan Hayter	Great Britain	4	32
6	Niklas Larsen	Denmark	3	30
7	Simone Consonni	Italy	2	28
8	Alan Banaszek	Poland	1	26
9	Iver Knotten	Norway	1	24
10	Alex Vogel	Switzerland	–19	22
11	Albert Torres	Spain	–19	20
12	Rui Oliveira	Portugal	–20	18
13	Rotem Tene	Israel	–20	16
14	Bertold Drijver	Hungary	–20	14
15	Daniel Crista	Romania	–20	12
16	Martin Chren	Slovakia	–20	10
17	George Nemilostivijs	Latvia	–20	8
18	Radovan Štec	Czech Republic	–20	6
19	Valentyn Kabashnyi	Ukraine	–20	4
20	Gustav Johansson	Sweden	–20	2
	Benjamin Thomas	France	DNS	
	Georgios Boutopoulos	Greece	DNS	

=== Elimination race ===
Rank	Name	Nation	Event points
1	Fabio Van den Bossche	Belgium	40
2	Rui Oliveira	Portugal	38
3	Alan Banaszek	Poland	36
4	Simone Consonni	Italy	34
5	Yanne Dorenbos	Netherlands	32
6	Tim Torn Teutenberg	Germany	30
8	Ethan Hayter	Great Britain	28
7	Niklas Larsen	Denmark	26
9	Alex Vogel	Switzerland	24
10	Valentyn Kabashnyi	Ukraine	22
11	Bertold Drijver	Hungary	20
12	Albert Torres	Spain	18
13	Radovan Štec	Czech Republic	16
14	Gustav Johansson	Sweden	14
15	Raphael Kokas	Austria	12
16	Daniel Crista	Romania	10
17	Rotem Tene	Israel	8
18	George Nemilostivijs	Latvia	6
19	Iver Knotten	Norway	4
20	Martin Chren	Slovakia	2

=== Points race ===
Overall rank	Name	Nation	Scratch race	Tempo race	Elim. race	Subtotal	Lap points	Sprint points	Finish order	Total points
1st place, gold medalist(s)	Ethan Hayter	Great Britain	38	32	26	96	0	25	5	121
2nd place, silver medalist(s)	Niklas Larsen	Denmark	34	30	28	92	20	9	16	121
3rd place, bronze medalist(s)	Fabio Van den Bossche	Belgium	32	40	40	112	0	6	13	118
4	Yanne Dorenbos	Netherlands	40	38	32	110	0	5	3	115
5	Rui Oliveira	Portugal	24	18	38	80	20	10	17	110
6	Tim Torn Teutenberg	Germany	30	36	30	96	0	9	12	105
7	Alan Banaszek	Poland	26	26	36	88	0	13	2	101
8	Simone Consonni	Italy	36	28	34	98	0	2	18	100
9	Raphael Kokas	Austria	22	34	12	68	20	8	14	96
10	Alex Vogel	Switzerland	2	22	24	48	20	18	1	86
11	Albert Torres	Germany	28	20	18	66	0	5	4	71
12	Bertold Drijver	Hungary	10	14	20	44	0	5	8	49
13	Iver Knotten	Norway	8	24	4	36	0	1	15	37
14	Radovan Štec	Czech Republic	18	6	16	40	–20	2	9	22
15	Daniel Crista	Romania	16	12	10	38	–20	0	6	18
16	Rotem Tene	Israel	14	16	18	38	–20	0	10	18
17	Martin Chren	Slovakia	12	10	2	24	–20	3	7	17
18	Gustav Johansson	Sweden	1	2	14	17	–20	0	11	–3
19	Valentyn Kabashnyi	Ukraine	4	4	22	30	–40	0	DNF	
20	George Nemilostivijs	Latvia	6	8	6	20	–20	0	DNF	
