= Tim Shoreman =

Scottish cyclist (born 2000)

Personal information
- Born: 1 May 2000 (age 26)

Cycling career
- Sport: Cycling
- Current team: Wheelbase-CabTech-Castelli
- Disciplines: Track; Road
- Role: Rider

Amateur team
- 2023-: Wheelbase-CabTech-Castelli

Tim Shoreman (born 1 May 2000) is a British track and road cyclist from Scotland. He won the Scottish national road racing championships in 2023 and the Scottish national individual pursuit title in 2025. He made his debut for the elite British track team at the 2026 UEC European Track Championships.

== Career ==
From Aberdeenshire, Shoreman won the 2023 Scottish National Road Race Championships as well as the Scottish Circuit Race Championships that year.

Riding for British team Wheelbase-CabTech-Castelli, Shoreman secured a win in Colne as part of the 2023 British National Circuit Race Championships in July 2023. Continuing with the team, he won stages at the Rás Tailteann in 2024 and 2025.

On the track, Shoreman won the Scottish national championships alongside Aaron King in the Madison in January 2024. In December 2025, he won the Scottish national individual pursuit title. In February 2026, he made his debut riding as part of the elite British track team at the 2026 UEC European Track Championships in Konya, Turkey, and had a top-ten finish in the individual pursuit.
