= Florian Maitre =

French cyclist

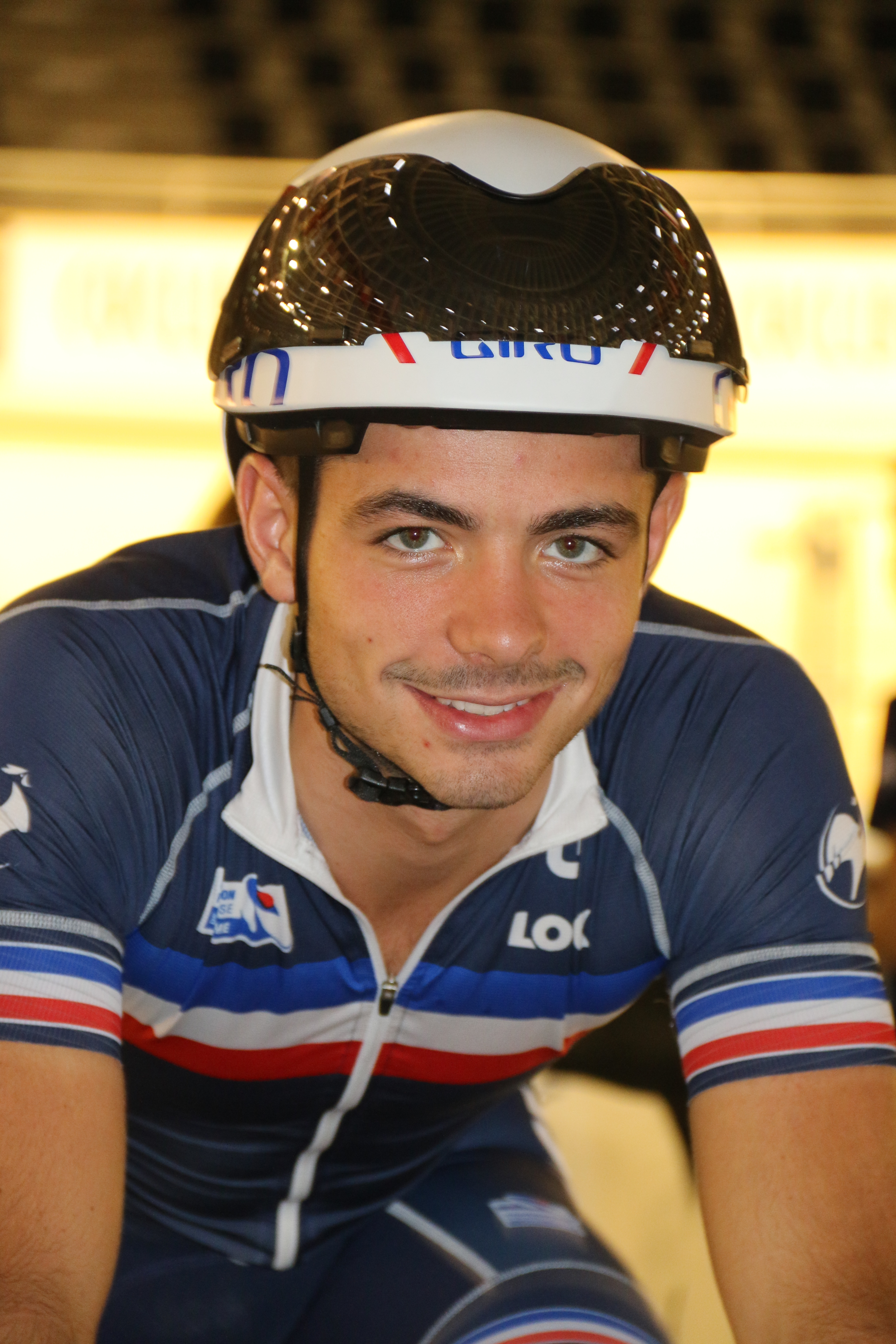
- Maitre in 2017

Personal information
- Full name: Florian Maitre
- Born: 3 September 1996 (age 30) Meudon, France
- Height: 1.8 m (5 ft 11 in)
- Weight: 71 kg (157 lb)

Cycling career
- Sport: Cycling
- Current team: Mayenne-V and B-Monbana
- Disciplines: Road; Track
- Role: Rider

Amateur teams
- 2014: VC Amateur Saint-Quentin Junior
- 2015–2019: Vendée U
- 2022: Laval Cyclisme 53
- 2023–: Mayenne-V and B-Monbana

Professional team
- 2020–2021: Total Direct Énergie
Medal record
Representing France
Men's track cycling
European Championships
Gold medal – first place	2016 Yvelines	Team pursuit
Gold medal – first place	2017 Berlin	Madison
Gold medal – first place	2017 Berlin	Team pursuit

Florian Maitre (born 3 September 1996) is a French professional racing cyclist, who currently rides for French amateur team Mayenne-V and B-Monbana. He rode in the men's team pursuit at the 2016 UCI Track Cycling World Championships.

== Major results ==
=== Road ===
2014
7th Chrono des Nations Juniors
2016
9th Paris–Mantes-en-Yvelines
2018
3rd Paris–Mantes-en-Yvelines
10th Overall Tour du Maroc

1st Mountains classification

2019
10th Overall Paris–Arras Tour

=== Track ===
2014
National Junior Championships

1st Points race
1st Team pursuit

2016
1st Team pursuit, UEC European Championships
UEC European Under-23 Championships

1st Team pursuit
2nd Madison (with Benjamin Thomas)

2017
UEC European Championships

1st Madison (with Benjamin Thomas)
1st Team pursuit

National Championships

1st Points race
1st Team pursuit
2nd Madison
3rd Scratch

2017–18 UCI World Cup

3rd Team pursuit, Machester
3rd Madison, Pruszków

2018
2nd Team pursuit, National Championships
2019
National Championships

1st Madison (with Donavan Grondin)
1st Team pursuit

3rd Madison, Hong Kong, 2018–19 UCI World Cup
2022
2nd Team pursuit, National Championships
2023
2nd Team pursuit, National Championships
