= Philip Heijnen =

Dutch cyclist

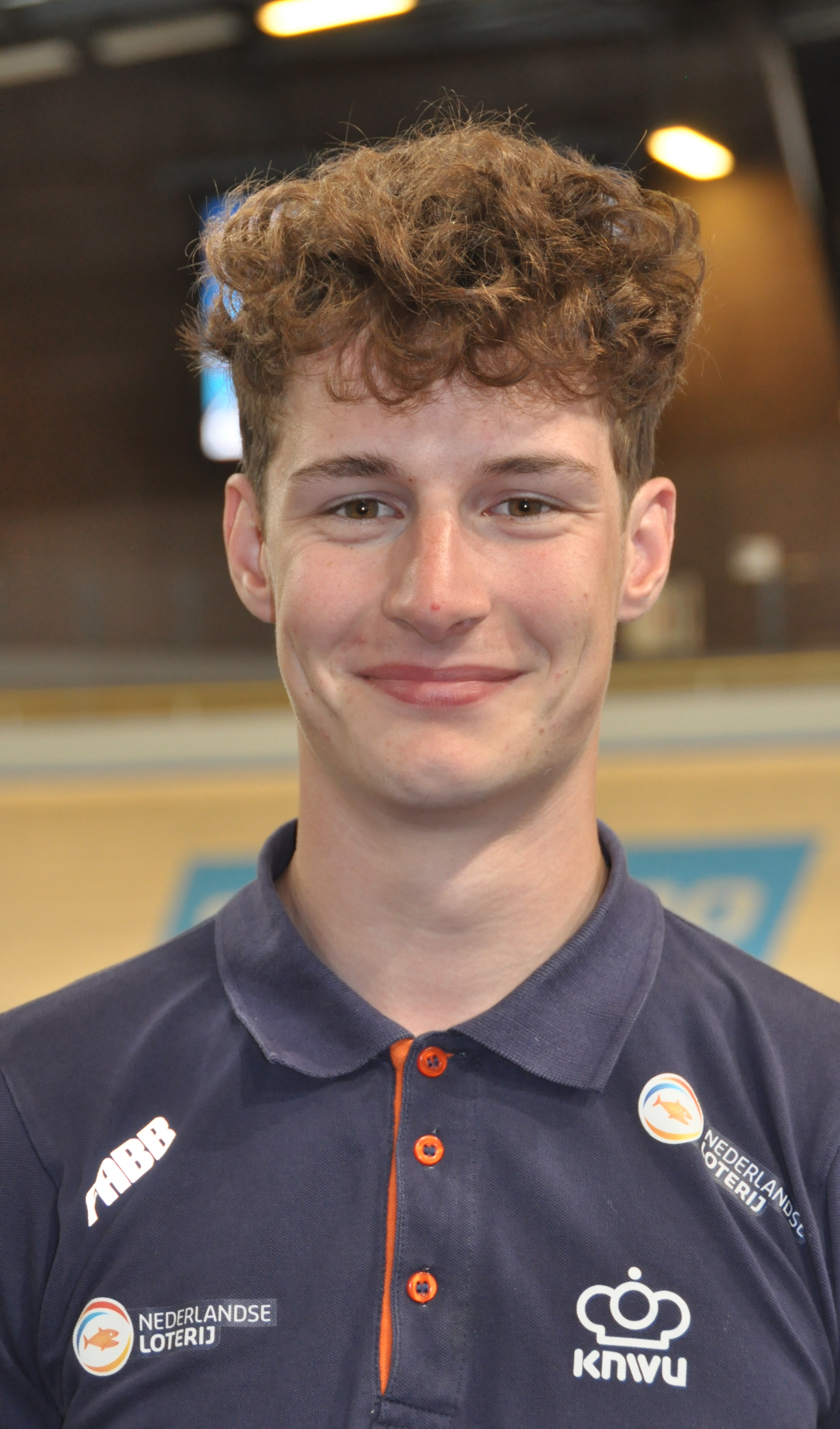
- Heijnen in 2021

Personal information
- Born: 25 June 2000 (age 26) Oeffelt, Netherlands

Cycling career
- Sport: Cycling
- Current team: Azerion / Villa Valkenburg
- Disciplines: Track; Road
- Role: Rider

Amateur team
- 2019–2022: Willebrord Wil Vooruit

Professional team
- 2023–: ABLOC CT
Medal record
Men's track cycling
Representing the Netherlands
World Championships
Bronze medal – third place	2024 Ballerup	Points race
European Championships
Bronze medal – third place	2023 Grenchen	Elimination
Bronze medal – third place	2025 Heusden-Zolder	Omnium

Philip Heijnen (born 25 June 2000) is a Dutch professional track and road cyclist, who currently rides for UCI Continental team Azerion / Villa Valkenburg.

== Major results ==
=== Track ===
2019
National Championships

1st Team pursuit
1st Derny

2021
1st Derny, National Championships
3rd Madison, UEC European Under-23 Championships (with Vincent Hoppezak)
2022
UEC European Under-23 Championships

1st Madison (with Yanne Dorenbos)
3rd Omnium

National Championships

1st Points race
1st Madison
1st Derny

2023
3rd Elimination, UEC European Championships
2024
3rd Points race, UCI World Championships
2025
3rd Omnium, UEC European Championships
