= 2026 UEC European Track Championships – Men's team pursuit =

Men's team pursuit at the 2026 UEC Track Elite European Championships
- Venue: Konya Velodrome, Konya
- Date: 1–2 February
- Competitors: 45 from 10 nations
- Teams: 10
- Winning time: 3:42.330

Medalists
gold medal	Lasse Norman Leth; Frederik Rodenberg; Rasmus Pedersen; Tobias Hansen; Robin Juel Skivild	Denmark
silver medal	Alex Vogel; Mats Poot; Noah Bögli; Luca Bühlmann; Pascal Tappeiner	Switzerland
bronze medal	Oliver Wood; Matthew Bostock; William Tidball; Henry Hobbs; Ben Wiggins	Great Britain

The Men's team pursuit competition at the 2026 UEC European Track Championships was held on 1 and 2 February 2026.

== Results ==
=== Qualifying ===
The eight fastest teams advanced to the first round.

Rank	Nation	Time	Behind	Notes
1	Denmark; Lasse Norman Leth; Frederik Rodenberg; Rasmus Pedersen; Robin Juel Skivild	3:44.405		Q
2	Great Britain; Oliver Wood; Matthew Bostock; Henry Hobbs; Ben Wiggins	3:46.497	+2.092	Q
3	Switzerland; Alex Vogel; Pascal Tappeiner; Mats Poot; Noah Bögli	3:46.699	+2.294	Q
4	Italy; Francesco Lamon; Etienne Grimod; Renato Favero; Niccolò Galli	3:47.637	+3.232	Q
5	Germany; Felix Groß; Benjamin Boos; Max-David Briese; Ben Jochum	3:49.373	+4.968	q
6	Belgium; Tuur Dens; Noah Vandenbranden; Renzo Raes; Thibault Bernard	3:49.788	+5.383	q
7	France; Valentin Tabellion; Oscar Nilsson-Julien; Mathieu Dupé; Ellande Larronde	3:50.263	+5.858	q
8	Spain; Héctor Álvarez; Álvaro Navas; Beñat Garaiar; Eñaut Urkaregi	3:53.161	+8.756	q
9	Ukraine; Vitaliy Hryniv; Roman Gladysh; Heorhii Chyzhykov; Oleh Smolynets	4:12.418	+28.013	
10	Romania; Eduard Grosu; Daniel Crista; Alin Toader; Mihnea Harasim	4:12.629	+28.224	

=== First round ===
First round heats were held as follows:
Heat 1: 7th v 8th fastest
Heat 2: 5th v 6th fastest
Heat 3: 2nd v 3rd fastest
Heat 4: 1st v 4th fastest

The winners of heats 3 and 4 proceeded to the gold medal race. The remaining six teams were ranked on time, from which the top two proceeded to the bronze medal race.

Heat	Rank	Nation	Time	Notes
1	1	France; Valentin Tabellion; Oscar Nilsson-Julien; Mathieu Dupé; Ellande Larronde	3:44.889	QB
1	2	Spain; Joan Martí Bennassar; Álvaro Navas; Beñat Garaiar; Eñaut Urkaregi	3:51.299	
2	1	Germany; Felix Groß; Benjamin Boos; Max-David Briese; Ben Jochum	3:45.853	
2	2	Belgium; Tuur Dens; Noah Vandenbranden; Milan Van den Haute; Thibault Bernard	3:48.698	
3	1	Switzerland; Alex Vogel; Pascal Tappeiner; Mats Poot; Noah Bögli	3:44.754	QG
3	2	Great Britain; Oliver Wood; Matthew Bostock; Henry Hobbs; Ben Wiggins	3:44.915	QB
4	1	Denmark; Lasse Norman Leth; Frederik Rodenberg; Rasmus Pedersen; Tobias Hansen	3:39.977	QG, WR
4	2	Italy; Francesco Lamon; Etienne Grimod; Renato Favero; Niccolò Galli	3:45.680	

=== Finals ===
Rank	Nation	Time	Behind	Notes
Gold medal final
1st place, gold medalist(s)	Denmark; Lasse Norman Leth; Frederik Rodenberg; Rasmus Pedersen; Tobias Hansen	3:42.330		
2nd place, silver medalist(s)	Switzerland; Alex Vogel; Mats Poot; Noah Bögli; Luca Bühlmann	3:47.033	+4.703	
Bronze medal final
3rd place, bronze medalist(s)	Great Britain; Oliver Wood; Matthew Bostock; William Tidball; Henry Hobbs			
4	France; Valentin Tabellion; Oscar Nilsson-Julien; Mathieu Dupé; Ellande Larronde	OVL		
