= Mats Poot =

Swiss cyclist (born 2005)

Personal information
- Born: 15 June 2005 (age 21)

Cycling career
- Sport: Cycling
- Current team: Velo Club Mendrisio
- Disciplines: Road; Track
- Role: Rider
Medal record
Representing Switzerland
Men's track cycling
European Championships
| Silver medal – second place | 2026 Konya | Team pursuit |
| Bronze medal – third place | 2025 Heusden-Zolder | Team pursuit |

Mats Poot (born 15 June 2005) is a Swiss track racing cyclist, who currently rides for club team Velo Club Mendrisio. He was a bronze medalist at the 2025 UEC European Track Championships.

== Career ==
In 2023, he finished third in the omnium at the Swiss track championships junior race. In 2024, he won Swiss championship titles in the kierin and sprint. competed for Switzerland at the 2023 UCI Junior Track Cycling World Championships in Cali, Colombia. At the championships, be was part of the team pursuit squad with Victor Benareau, Luca Bühlmann, and Arthur Guillet, that secured a fourth place finish, defeated by the Canadian team in the bronze medal race. Poot also participated in the elimination race, finishing sixth. In January 2025, he won the Swiss championship scratch race.

Aged 19 years-old, he was a bronze medalist at the 2025 UEC European Track Championships in the team pursuit in Belgium, in February 2025, alongside Noah Bögli, Alex Vogel and Pascal Tappeiner. The following year, he upgraded to a silver in the men's team pursuit at the 2026 UEC European Track Championships in Konya, Turkey, in February 2026, riding alongside Vogel, Bühlmann and Bögli, finishing runner-up to Denmark.

== Major results ==
=== Track ===
2025
3rd Team pursuit, UEC European Championships
2026
2nd Team pursuit, UEC European Championships
