= Renato Favero =

Italian bicycle racer (born 2005)

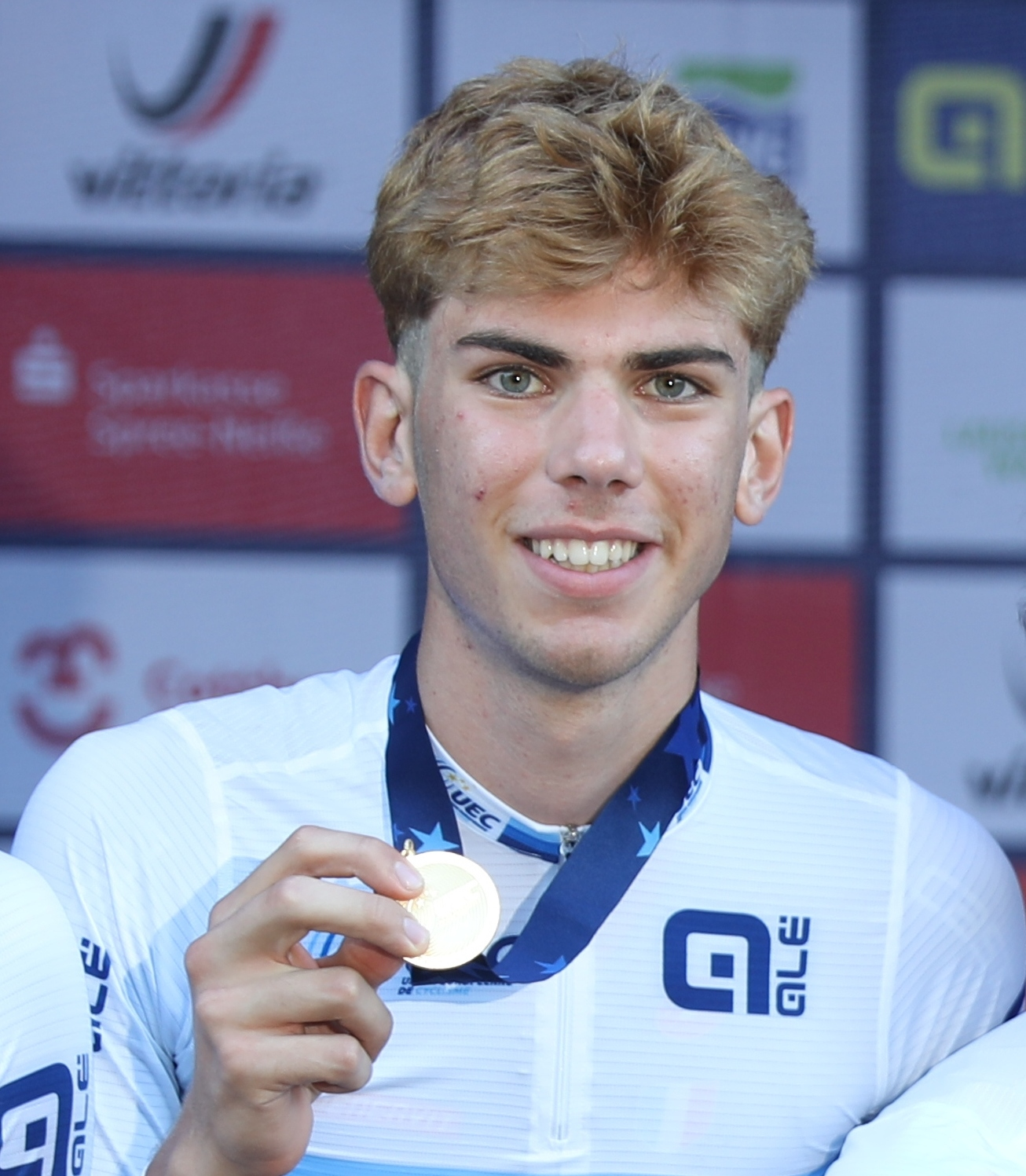
- Favero in 2024

Personal information
- Born: 27 February 2005 (age 21)
- Height: 1.92 m (6 ft 4 in)

Cycling career
- Sport: Cycling
- Current team: Biesse–Carrera–Premac
- Disciplines: Road; Track
- Role: Rider

Amateur team
- 2022–2023: Borgo Molino–Rinascita Ormelle

Professional teams
- 2024–2025: Soudal–Quick-Step Devo Team
- 2026–: Biesse–Carrera–Premac
Medal record
Men's track cycling
Representing Italy
European Championships
Bronze medal – third place	2026 Konya	Individual pursuit
European Under-23 Championships
Gold medal – first place	2024 Cottbus	Team pursuit
Silver medal – second place	2025 Anadia	Individual pursuit
Bronze medal – third place	2025 Anadia	Team pursuit
World Junior Championships
Gold medal – first place	2022 Tel Aviv	Team pursuit
Gold medal – first place	2023 Cali	Team pursuit
European Junior Championships
Gold medal – first place	2022 Anadia	Team pursuit
Gold medal – first place	2023 Anadia	Team pursuit

Renato Favero (born 27 February 2005) is an Italian cyclist, who currently rides for UCI Continental team Biesse–Carrera–Premac.

== Career ==
From Venice, in 2021, he won the Italian under-17 time trial championships. He won a gold medal at the 2022 UCI Junior Track Cycling World Championships in Tel Aviv, Israel in the team pursuit. That year, he represented Italy at the 2022 UCI Road World Championships in the men's junior time trial. In November 2023, he joined Soudal–Quick-Step Devo Team ahead of the 2024 season.

On the track, he placed fourth in the individual pursuit at the 2025 UEC European Track Championships, losing the bronze medal race to Michael Gill of Great Britain.

He won the bronze medal at the 2026 UEC European Track Championships in Konya, Turkey in the men's individual pursuit, catching Matthew Bostock of Great Britain in the bronze medal race with 750m to go.

== Major results ==
=== Road ===
2023
1st Gran Premio Eccellenze Valli del Soligo (TTT)
1st Stage 1a (TTT) Eroica Juniores – Nations' Cup
2025
1st Omloop Mandel-Leie-Schelde
4th Time trial, National Under-23 Championships
