= Ben Wiggins =

British cyclist

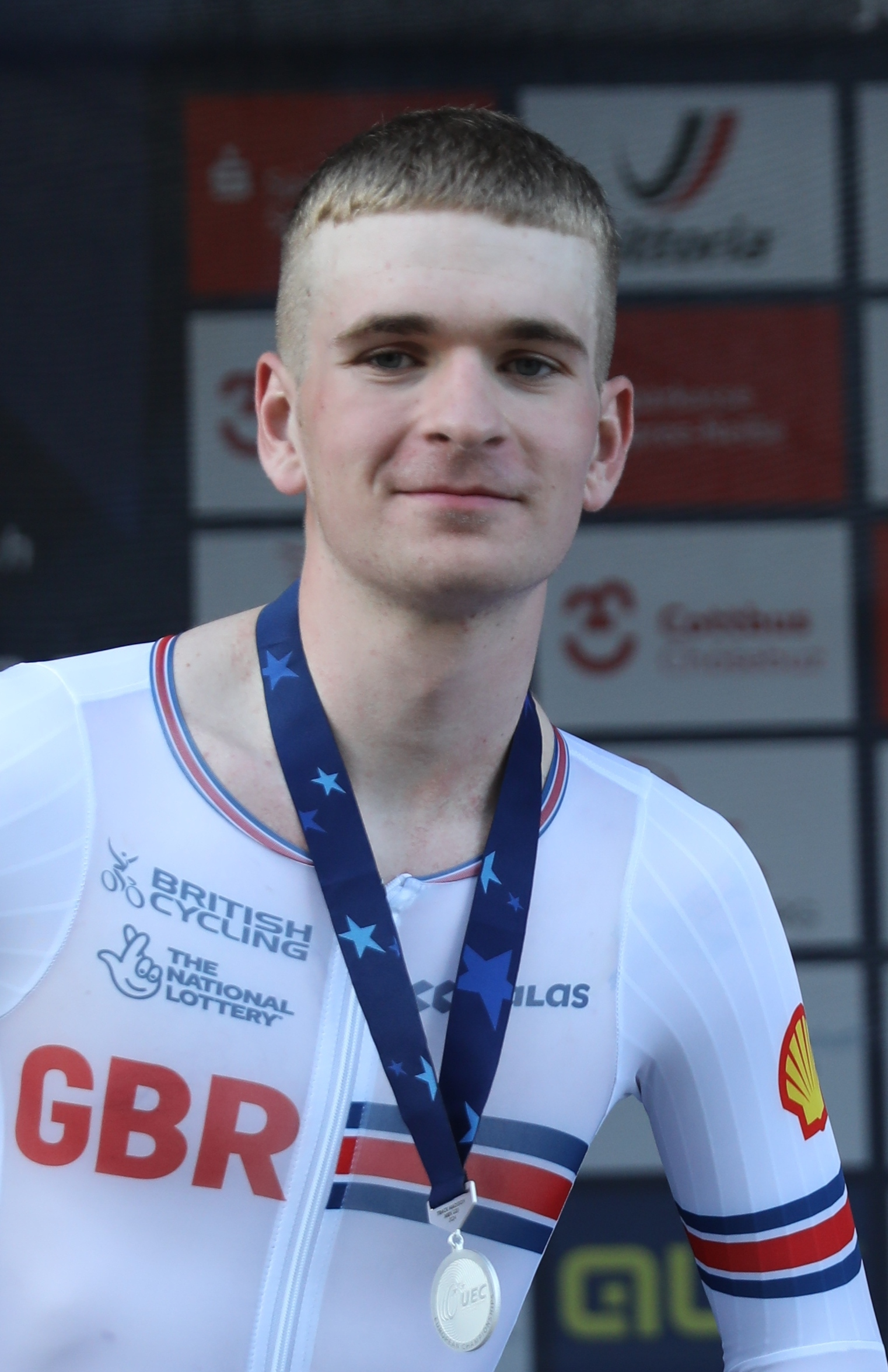
- Ben Wiggins (2024)

Personal information
- Born: 26 March 2005 (age 21) Ormskirk, England
- Height: 183 cm (6 ft 0 in)
- Weight: 78 kg (172 lb)

Cycling career
- Sport: Cycling
- Current team: Hagens Berman Jayco
- Disciplines: Track; Road
- Role: Rider

Amateur team
- 2022–2023: Fensham Howes–MAS Design

Professional team
- 2024–: Hagens Berman Jayco
Medal record
Men's road bicycle racing
Representing Great Britain
World Championships
| Silver medal – second place | 2023 Glasgow | Junior time trial |
Men's track cycling
European Championships
| Bronze medal – third place | 2026 Konya | Team pursuit |
European Under-23 Championships
| Gold medal – first place | 2025 Anadia | Team pursuit |
| Bronze medal – third place | 2025 Anadia | Madison |
World Junior Championships
| Gold medal – first place | 2023 Cali | Madison |
European Junior Championships
| Gold medal – first place | 2022 Anadia | Points race |

Ben Wiggins (born 26 March 2005) is a British cyclist, who currently rides for UCI Continental team Hagens Berman Jayco. In 2023, he became the Junior World Champion in the Madison. He is the son of Bradley Wiggins, the first British winner of the Tour de France, and the grandson of Australian cyclist Gary Wiggins.

== Career ==
In 2022, Wiggins signed to ride for the junior team of Fensham Howes-MAS Design team, run by Giles Pidcock, father of Tom Pidcock. Wiggins finished sixth in the Time Trial at the 2022 junior Nations Cup race Grand Prix du Morbihan, which starts in Josselin in Brittany. He won silver in the junior individual time trial at the British National Road Championships in 2022, behind Josh Tarling. Wiggins won the gold medal for the points race at the 2022 UEC European Track Championships (under-23 & junior) in Anadia, Portugal in 2022. That year, he also raced in the six-day event in Ghent for the first time.

Wiggins started 2023 by returning to ride for Fensham Howes-MAS Design. In July 2023, he finished runner-up in the British Junior individual time trial competition behind Jacob Bush. Wiggins told The Times in August 2023 that he planned to race both in track cycling and road cycling in the short term. He was selected for the junior road race and junior time trial at the 2023 UCI World Championships held in Glasgow. He won a silver medal in the time trial. That month, competing at the Junior Track Cycling World Championships in Cali, Colombia, he became the junior world champion in the Madison, alongside Matthew Brennan.

He signed for Hagens Berman Axeon ahead of the 2024 season. In July 2024, Wiggins won the silver medal in the points race at the 2024 UEC European Track U23 Championships, in Cottbus, behind Conrad Haugsted of Denmark.

In June 2025, he finished runner-up in the men's U23 race at the British National Time Trial Championships.

In February 2026, Wiggins rode as part of the British team that won a bronze medal at the 2026 UEC European Track Championships in Konya, Turkey, in the men's team pursuit. He also had a fourth place finish in the men's points race in his debut event at the elite level. In June, Wiggins won the U23 time trial at the 2026 British national championships.

Ahead of the 2027 season, Wiggins signed for UCI WorldTeam Team Jayco-AlUla.

== Personal life ==
He is the son of cyclist Bradley Wiggins. Ben grew up playing a number of different sports, he was a keen rugby player from a young age and attended Kirkham Grammar School where he played rugby throughout his school years. Despite being a cyclist his whole life, he only turned his full attention to racing in 2021.

Ben has also stated he is a Liverpool FC supporter.

== Major results ==
=== Road ===
2022
2nd Time trial, National Junior Championships
2023
1st Overall Trophée Centre Morbihan
2nd Time trial, UCI World Junior Championships
2nd Time trial, National Junior Championships
7th Overall Tour de Gironde
9th Overall Guido Reybrouck Classic
2024
2nd Time trial, National Under-23 Championships
2025
2nd Time trial, National Under-23 Championships
6th Chrono des Nations Under-23
2026
1st Time trial, National Under-23 Championships
9th Overall Tour of Rhodos
9th Coppa della Pace
10th Overall Tour of Britain

=== Track ===
2022
UEC European Junior Championships

1st Points race
3rd Team pursuit

National Junior Championships

1st Individual pursuit
2nd Madison (with Jed Smithson)
3rd Points race

3rd Team pursuit, National Championships
2023
1st Madison, UCI World Junior Championships (with Matthew Brennan)
UEC European Junior Championships

2nd Team pursuit
2nd Madison (with Matthew Brennan)
3rd Individual pursuit

2024
UEC European Under-23 Championships

2nd Points race
2nd Madison (with Noah Hobbs)

3rd Team pursuit, National Championships
3rd Three Days of London (with Yoeri Havik)
2025
UEC European Under-23 Championships

1st Team pursuit
3rd Madison (with Noah Hobbs)

3rd Points race, National Championships
2026
2nd Points race, National Championships
3rd Team pursuit, UEC European Championships
