= Niklas Larsen =

Danish cyclist (born 1997)

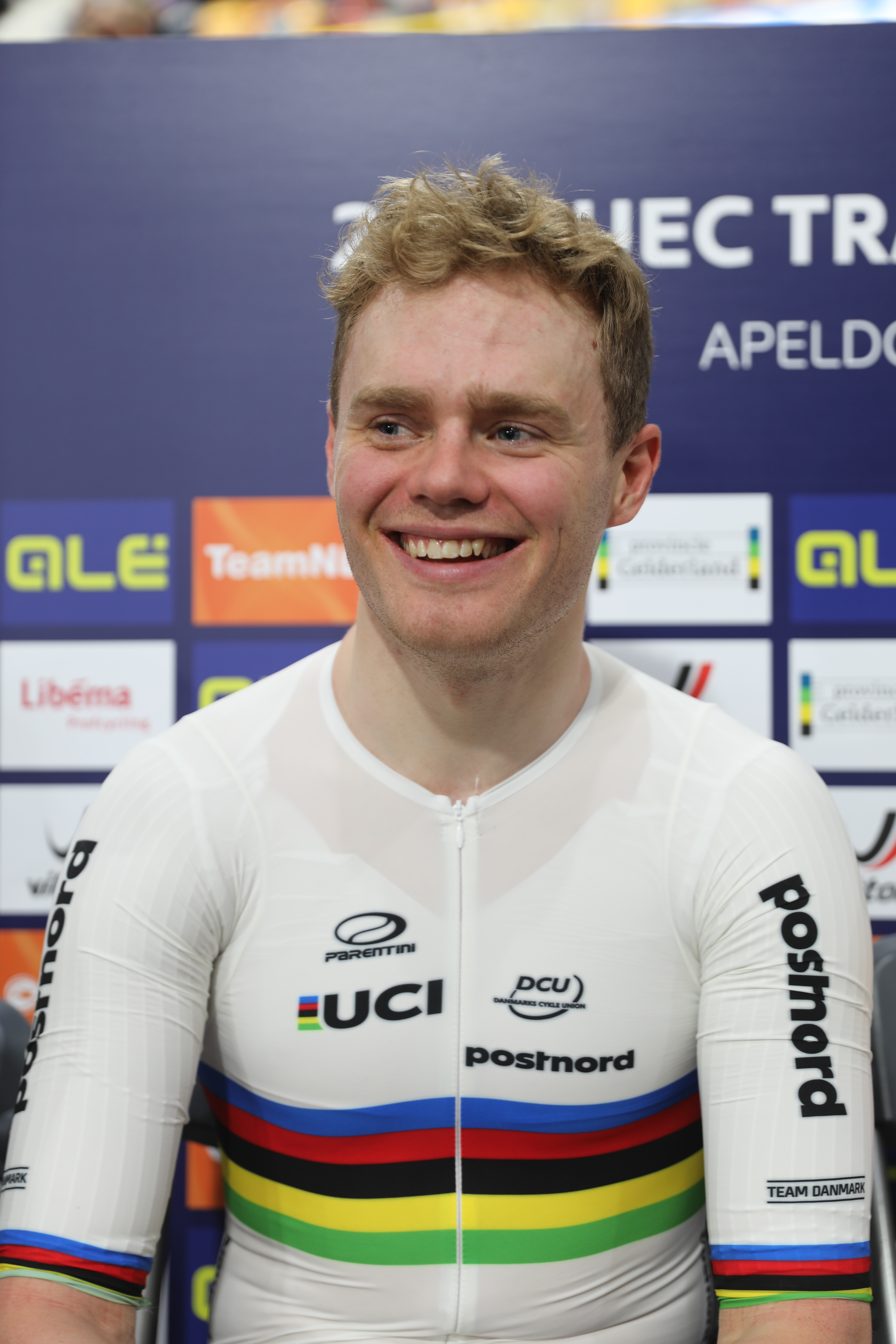
- Larsen at the 2024 UEC European Track Championships

Personal information
- Born: 22 March 1997 (age 29) Slagelse, Denmark
- Height: 1.83 m (6 ft 0 in)
- Weight: 74 kg (163 lb)

Cycling career
- Sport: Cycling
- Current team: Unibet Rose Rockets
- Disciplines: Road; Track
- Role: Rider

Professional teams
- 2016–2018: Team TreFor
- 2019: Team ColoQuick
- 2020–2024: Uno-X Norwegian Development Team
- 2025: BHS–PL Beton Bornholm
- 2026–: Unibet Rose Rockets

Major wins
- Road Stage races Danmark Rundt (2019) Track World Championships Team pursuit (2023, 2024, 2025)
Medal record
Men's track cycling
Representing Denmark
Olympic Games
| Silver medal – second place | 2020 Tokyo | Team pursuit |
| Bronze medal – third place | 2016 Rio de Janeiro | Team pursuit |
| Bronze medal – third place | 2024 Paris | Madison |
World Championships
| Gold medal – first place | 2023 Glasgow | Team pursuit |
| Gold medal – first place | 2024 Ballerup | Team pursuit |
| Gold medal – first place | 2025 Santiago | Team pursuit |
| Silver medal – second place | 2018 Apeldoorn | Team pursuit |
| Silver medal – second place | 2024 Ballerup | Points race |
| Bronze medal – third place | 2016 London | Team pursuit |
| Bronze medal – third place | 2019 Pruszków | Team pursuit |
| Bronze medal – third place | 2024 Ballerup | Madison |
| Bronze medal – third place | 2025 Santiago | Madison |
European Championships
| Gold medal – first place | 2016 Yvelines | Points race |
| Gold medal – first place | 2024 Apeldoorn | Points race |
| Gold medal – first place | 2025 Heusden-Zolder | Team pursuit |
| Silver medal – second place | 2017 Berlin | Madison |
| Silver medal – second place | 2017 Berlin | Points race |
| Silver medal – second place | 2024 Apeldoorn | Omnium |
| Silver medal – second place | 2024 Apeldoorn | Team pursuit |
| Silver medal – second place | 2025 Heusden-Zolder | Omnium |
Men's road bicycle racing
European Championships
| Silver medal – second place | 2019 Alkmaar | Under-23 road race |
| Bronze medal – third place | 2025 Guilherand-Granges | Elite time trial |

Niklas Larsen (born 22 March 1997) is a Danish professional track and road racing cyclist, who currently rides for UCI ProTeam Unibet Rose Rockets. He rode in the men's team pursuit at the 2016 UCI Track Cycling World Championships winning a bronze medal.

== Major results ==
=== Road ===
2014
1st Time trial, National Junior Championships
1st Stage 3 (ITT) Grand Prix Rüebliland
3rd Overall Trophée Centre Morbihan
2015
1st Stage 2a (ITT) Trofeo Karlsberg
1st Stage 3 (ITT) Grand Prix Rüebliland
7th Time trial, UCI World Junior Championships
2017
1st Mountains classification, Ronde van Midden-Nederland
4th Time trial, National Under-23 Championships
6th Duo Normand (with Kasper Asgreen)
2018
1st Eschborn–Frankfurt U23
2nd Overall Rhône-Alpes Isère Tour

1st Points classification
1st Mountains classification
1st Stage 1

2nd Road race, National Championships
National Under-23 Championships

2nd Road race
4th Time trial

2nd Circuit de Wallonie
3rd Scandinavian Race Uppsala
2019 (1 pro win)
1st Overall Danmark Rundt

1st Young rider classification

1st Himmerland Rundt
1st Lillehammer GP
2nd Road race, UEC European Under-23 Championships
2nd Skive–Løbet
3rd Road race, National Championships
4th Gylne Gutuer
7th Overall Tour d'Eure-et-Loir
2020
1st Stage 1 (TTT) Giro del Friuli-Venezia Giulia
2021
1st Fyen Rundt
3rd GP Herning
5th Time trial, National Championships
2023
4th Time trial, National Championships
2025
1st Overall Tour du Loir et Cher

1st Stage 1

2nd Time trial, National Championships
2nd Overall Tour of Estonia
2nd GP Herning
3rd Time trial, UEC European Championships
3rd Overall Danmark Rundt
3rd Volta NXT Classic
3rd Cholet Agglo Tour
3rd Ringerike GP
3rd Sundvolden GP
4th Giro Himledalen
2026
5th Overall Étoile de Bessèges
8th Overall Tour Poitou-Charentes en Nouvelle-Aquitaine

=== Track ===
2015
2nd Team pursuit, UEC European Junior Championships
2016
1st Points race, UEC European Championships
2nd Team pursuit, UCI World Cup, Hong Kong
3rd Team pursuit, Olympic Games
3rd Team pursuit, UCI World Championships
2017
UCI World Cup

1st Team pursuit, Cali
1st Madison, Cali (with Casper von Folsach)
1st Omnium, Pruszków
2nd Points race, Cali

UEC European Under-23 Championships

1st Points race
2nd Omnium
3rd Scratch

UEC European Championships

2nd Madison (with Casper Pedersen)
2nd Points race

2018
2nd Team pursuit, UCI World Championships
2021
2nd Team pursuit, Olympic Games
2023
1st Team pursuit, UCI World Championships
2024
UCI World Championships

1st Team pursuit
2nd Points race
3rd Madison (with Michael Mørkøv)

UEC European Championships

1st Points race
2nd Omnium
2nd Team pursuit

3rd Madison, Olympic Games (with Michael Mørkøv)
2025
UCI World Championships

1st Team pursuit
3rd Madison (with Lasse Norman Leth)

UEC European Championships

1st Team pursuit
2nd Omnium
