= 2025 UEC European Track Championships =

Cycling championships

- Venue: Heusden-Zolder, Belgium
- Date: 12–16 February
- Velodrome: Velodroom Limburg
- Events: 22 (11 women, 11 men)

The 2025 UEC European Track Championships was the sixteenth edition of the elite UEC European Track Championships in track cycling and took place at the Velodroom Limburg in Heusden-Zolder, Belgium, from 12 to 16 February 2025.

== Schedule ==
Competition	F	Final

Men
Date →	Wed 12		Thu 13		Fri 14		Sat 15		Sun 16
Event ↓	A	E	A	E	A	E	A	E	A
Sprint					Q, ^{1}/_{16}, ^{1}/_{8}	QF		SF, F	
Team sprint	Q	R1, F							
Team pursuit	Q		R1	F					
Keirin									R1, R, R2, F
Omnium							Q, SR, TR	ER, PR	
Madison									F
1 km time trial			Q	F					
Pursuit					Q	F			
Points race				F					
Scratch						F			
Elimination race		F							

Women
Date →	Wed 12		Thu 13		Fri 14		Sat 15		Sun 16
Event ↓	A	E	A	E	A	E	A	E	A
Sprint			Q, ^{1}/_{16}, ^{1}/_{8}	QF		SF, F			
Team sprint	Q	R1, F							
Team pursuit	Q		R1	F					
Keirin									R1, R, R2, F
Omnium					SR, TR	ER, PR			
Madison									F
1 km time trial							Q	F	
Pursuit							Q	F	
Points race								F	
Scratch		F							
Elimination race				F					

A = Afternoon session, E = Evening session
Q = qualifiers, R1 = first round, R2 = second round, R = repechages, ^{1}/_{16} = sixteenth finals, ^{1}/_{8} = eighth finals, QF = quarterfinals, SF = semifinals,
SR = Scratch Race, TR = Tempo Race, ER = Elimination Race, PR = Points Race

== Events ==
Event	Gold		Silver		Bronze	
Men's events
Sprint	Harrie Lavreysen; Netherlands		Mikhail Yakovlev; Israel		Rayan Helal; France	
Team sprint	France; Timmy Gillion; Rayan Helal; Sébastien Vigier	42.609^{G}	Netherlands; Harrie Lavreysen; Loris Leneman; Tijmen van Loon	43.253^{G}	Great Britain; Harry Ledingham-Horn; Hayden Norris; Harry Radford	43.152^{B}
Team pursuit	Denmark; Tobias Hansen; Niklas Larsen; Lasse Norman Leth; Robin Juel Skivild	3:51.113^{G}	Great Britain; Rhys Britton; Josh Charlton; Michael Gill; Noah Hobbs; William Tidball	3:51.832^{G}	Switzerland; Noah Bögli; Mats Poot; Pascal Tappeiner; Alex Vogel	3:53.467^{B}
Keirin	Harrie Lavreysen; Netherlands		Maximilian Dörnbach; Germany		Tom Derache; France	
Omnium	Tim Torn Teutenberg; Germany	167 pts	Niklas Larsen; Denmark	165 pts	Philip Heijnen; Netherlands	147 pts
Madison	Netherlands; Yanne Dorenbos; Vincent Hoppezak	119 pts	Germany; Roger Kluge; Tim Torn Teutenberg	105 pts	Portugal; Ivo Oliveira; Rui Oliveira	96 pts
1 km time trial^{[N]}	Matteo Bianchi; Italy	59.965	Maximilian Dörnbach; Germany	1:00.390	David Peterka; Czech Republic	1:01.018
Individual pursuit^{[N]}	Josh Charlton; Great Britain	4:02.882^{G}	Ivo Oliveira; Portugal	4:03.631^{G}	Michael Gill; Great Britain	4:09.859^{B}
Points race^{[O]}	Iúri Leitão; Portugal	157 pts	Yanne Dorenbos; Netherlands	114 pts	Jasper De Buyst; Belgium	106 pts
Scratch^{[O]}	Iúri Leitão; Portugal		Vincent Hoppezak; Netherlands		William Tidball; Great Britain	
Elimination race^{[O]}	Tim Torn Teutenberg; Germany		Rui Oliveira; Portugal		Jules Hesters; Belgium	
Women's events
Sprint	Yana Burlakova; Individual Neutral Athletes		Rhian Edmunds; Great Britain		Alina Lysenko; Individual Neutral Athletes	
Team sprint	Netherlands; Kimberly Kalee; Hetty van de Wouw; Steffie van der Peet	46.322^{G}	Great Britain; Lauren Bell; Rhian Edmunds; Rhianna Parris-Smith	46.929^{G}	Germany; Lea Friedrich; Pauline Grabosch; Clara Schneider	47.333^{B}
Team pursuit	Italy; Martina Alzini; Chiara Consonni; Martina Fidanza; Vittoria Guazzini	4:14.213^{G}	Germany; Franziska Brauße; Lisa Klein; Mieke Kröger; Laura Süßemilch	4:14.939^{G}	Great Britain; Maddie Leech; Sophie Lewis; Grace Lister; Anna Morris; Neah Evans	4:18.147^{B}
Keirin	Steffie van der Peet; Netherlands		Rhian Edmunds; Great Britain		Hetty van de Wouw; Netherlands	
Omnium	Lorena Wiebes; Netherlands	114 pts	Maddie Leech; Great Britain	114 pts	Amalie Dideriksen; Denmark	103 pts
Madison	Netherlands; Lisa van Belle; Maike van der Duin	62 pts	Italy; Chiara Consonni; Vittoria Guazzini	53 pts	France; Victoire Berteau; Marion Borras	42 pts
1 km time trial^{[N]}	Hetty van de Wouw; Netherlands	1:04.497; WR	Martina Fidanza; Italy	1:05.969	Clara Schneider; Germany	1:06.745
Individual pursuit^{[N]}	Anna Morris; Great Britain	4:25.874^{G} WR	Vittoria Guazzini; Italy	4:34.098^{G}	Mieke Kröger; Germany	4:33.451^{B}
Points race^{[O]}	Anita Stenberg; Norway	56 pts	Marion Borras; France	54 pts	Maike van der Duin; Netherlands	53 pts
Scratch^{[O]}	Martina Fidanza; Italy		Lorena Wiebes; Netherlands		Maria Martins; Portugal	
Elimination race^{[O]}	Lara Gillespie; Ireland		Hélène Hesters; Belgium		Lisa van Belle; Netherlands	

- Competitors named in italics only participated in rounds prior to the final.
- ^{^{N}} These events are not contested in the Olympics.
- ^{^{O}} In the Olympics, these events are contested within the omnium only.

== Medal table ==
* Host nation (Belgium)

Rank	Nation	Gold	Silver	Bronze	Total
1	Netherlands	8	4	4	16
2	Italy	3	3	0	6
3	Great Britain	2	5	4	11
4	Germany	2	4	3	9
5	Portugal	2	2	2	6
6	France	1	1	3	5
7	Denmark	1	1	1	3
–	Individual Neutral Athletes	1	0	1	2
8	Ireland	1	0	0	1
8	Norway	1	0	0	1
10	Belgium*	0	1	2	3
11	Israel	0	1	0	1
12	Czech Republic	0	0	1	1
12	Switzerland	0	0	1	1
Totals (13 entries)		22	22	22	66
