= Conrad Haugsted =

Danish cyclist (born 2005)

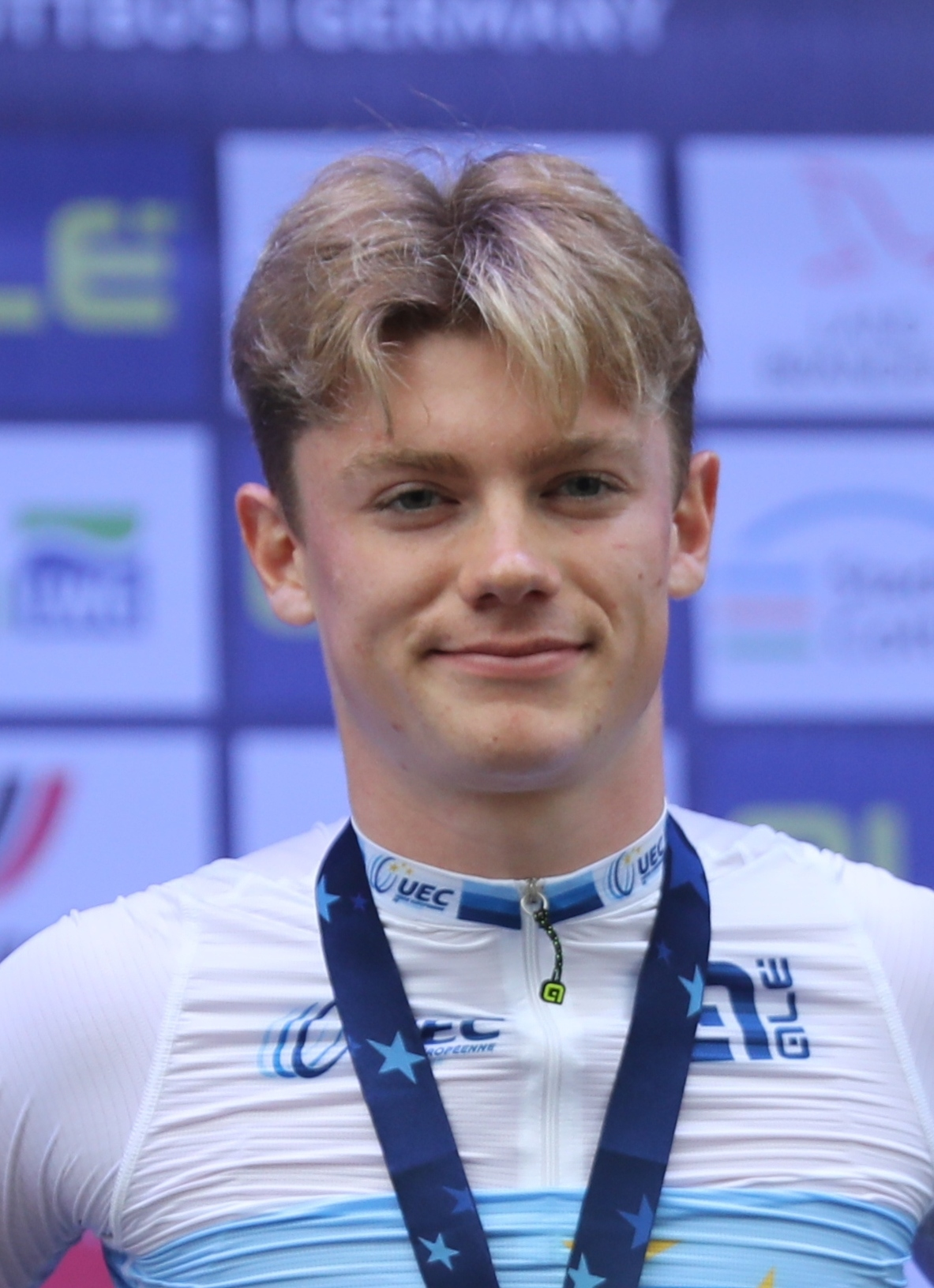
- Haugsted in 2024

Personal information
- Born: 23 January 2005 (age 21) Copenhagen, Denmark

Cycling career
- Sport: Cycling
- Current team: Team ColoQuick
- Disciplines: Road; Track
- Role: Rider

Amateur teams
- 2022: Team Fri BikeShop–Zealand Cycling Junior
- 2023: NPV–Carl Ras Roskilde Junior

Professional team
- 2024–: Team ColoQuick
Medal record
Men's track cycling
Representing Denmark
European Championships
Silver medal – second place	2026 Konya	Points race
European Under-23 Championships
Gold medal – first place	2024 Cottbus	Points race

Conrad Haugsted (born 13 January 2005) is a Danish track and road cyclist, who rides for UCI Continental Team ColoQuick. He won a silver medal in the points race at the 2026 UEC European Track Championships.

== Career ==
From Bergen, at the age of 16 in December 2021, he won a bronze medal at the Danish Championships in the Senior Madison race with Theodor Storm.

In July 2024, Haugstad won the gold medal in the points race at the 2024 UEC European Track U23 Championships, ahead of Ben Wiggins of Great Britain. Racing with Robin Skivild, Haugsted won the six-day race at DBC Ballerups in 2025.

Haugsted won a silver medal in the points race at the 2026 UEC European Track Championships in Turkey in February 2026, finishing as runner-up to German rider Tim Torn Teutenberg with Belgian rider Jasper De Buyst in bronze. Haugsted won four of the sprints of the day, scoring points in six.

== Major results ==
=== Road ===
2023
1st Slageseløbet
2024
8th Eschborn–Frankfurt Under-23
2025
1st Eschborn–Frankfurt Under-23
3rd Overall Holstebro Tours

1st Stage 1

=== Track ===
2026
2nd Points race, UEC European Championships
