= 2023 UCI Junior Track Cycling World Championships =

- Venue: Cali, Colombia
- Date: 23–27 August
- Velodrome: Velódromo Alcides Nieto Patiño

The 2023 UCI Junior Track Cycling World Championships were the 48th annual Junior World Championships for track cycling, held in Cali, Colombia from 23 to 27 August.

The Championships had eleven events each for men and women (sprint, points race, individual pursuit, team pursuit, time trial, team sprint, keirin, madison, scratch race, omnium, elimination race).

== Medal summary ==
Event	Gold	Silver	Bronze
Men's events
Sprint	Nikita Kiriltsev; Individual Neutral Athletes	Tayte Ryan; Australia	Cole Dempster; Canada
Points race	Ethan Powell; Canada	Juan David Sierra; Italy	Daniil Kazakov; Individual Neutral Athletes
Individual pursuit	Matthew Brennan; United Kingdom	Luca Giaimi; Italy	Vladimir Goncharov; Individual Neutral Athletes
Team pursuit	Renato Favero; Matteo Fiorin; Etienne Grimod; Juan David Sierra; Italy	Leon Arenz; Lui Bengelsdorf; Louis Gentzik; Bruno Keßler; Germany	Charles Bergeron; Kaden Colling; Ethan Powell; Justin Roy; Canada
Time trial	Tayte Ryan; Australia	Nolan Huysmans; Belgium	Ivan Samusev; Individual Neutral Athletes
Team sprint	Pete-Collin Flemming; Colin Rudolph; Jakob Vogt; Germany	Huang Ruiting; Sun Haoran; Xie Han; China	Nolan Huysmans; Tjorven Mertens; Yeno Vingerhoets; Belgium
Keirin	Nikita Kiriltsev; Individual Neutral Athletes	Francisco Jaramillo; Colombia	Pete-Collin Flemming; Germany
Madison	Matthew Brennan; Ben Wiggins; Great Britain	Tom Crabbe; Milan Van den Haute; Belgium	Matteo Fiorin; Juan David Sierra; Italy
Scratch race	Ruslan Kuznetsov; Individual Neutral Athletes	Matthew Brennan; United Kingdom	Conrad Haugsted; Denmark
Omnium	Daniil Yakovlev; Ukraine	Žak Eržen; Slovenia	Bruno Keßler; Germany
Elimination race	Rubén Sánchez; Spain	Matvey Ushakov; Ukraine	Davide Stella; Italy

Event	Gold	Silver	Bronze
Women's events
Sprint	Elizaveta Solozobova; Individual Neutral Athletes	Stefany Cuadrado; Colombia	Luo Xuehuang; China
Individual pursuit	Federica Venturelli; Italy	Juliana Londoño; Colombia	Felicity Wilson-Haffenden; Australia
Time trial	Luo Xuehuang; China	Elizaveta Solozobova; Individual Neutral Athletes	Ekaterina Evlanova; Individual Neutral Athletes
Points race	Mélanie Dupin; France	Isabel Sharp; United Kingdom	Valentina Zanzi; Italy
Keirin	Stefany Cuadrado; Colombia	Nathalia Martínez; Colombia	Caitlin Kelly; New Zealand
Scratch race	Nicole Duncan; Australia	Anita Baima; Italy	Laerke Expeels; Belgium
Team sprint	Bian Yimin; Guo Mengyao; Luo Xuehuang; China	Anastasia Kuniß; Bente Lürmann; Anne Slosharek; Germany	Beatrice Bertolini; Carola Ratti; Asia Sgaravato; Italy
Team pursuit	Clémence Chéreau; Mélanie Dupin; Léonie Mahieu; Léane Tabu; France	Vittoria Grassi; Alice Toniolli; Federica Venturelli; Valentina Zanzi; Italy	Lauren Bates; Sally Carter; Nicole Duncan; Keira Will; Australia
Omnium	Juliana Londoño; Colombia	Clémence Chéreau; France	Misaki Okamoto; Japan
Madison	Vittoria Grassi; Federica Venturelli; Italy	Nicole Duncan; Keira Will; Australia	Adéla Marková; Patricie Müllerová; Czech Republic
Elimination race	Anita Baima; Italy	Isabel Sharp; United Kingdom	Ayana Mizutani; Japan

== Medal table ==
* Host nation (Colombia)

Rank	Nation	Gold	Silver	Bronze	Total
1	Italy	4	4	4	12
2	Colombia*	2	4	0	6
3	Great Britain	2	3	0	5
4	Australia	2	2	2	6
5	China	2	1	1	4
6	France	2	1	0	3
7	Germany	1	2	2	5
8	Ukraine	1	1	0	2
9	Canada	1	0	2	3
10	Spain	1	0	0	1
11	Belgium	0	2	2	4
12	Slovenia	0	1	0	1
13	Japan	0	0	2	2
14	Czech Republic	0	0	1	1
14	Denmark	0	0	1	1
14	New Zealand	0	0	1	1
Totals (16 entries)		18	21	18	57
