= Noah Bögli =

Swiss cyclist (born 1996)

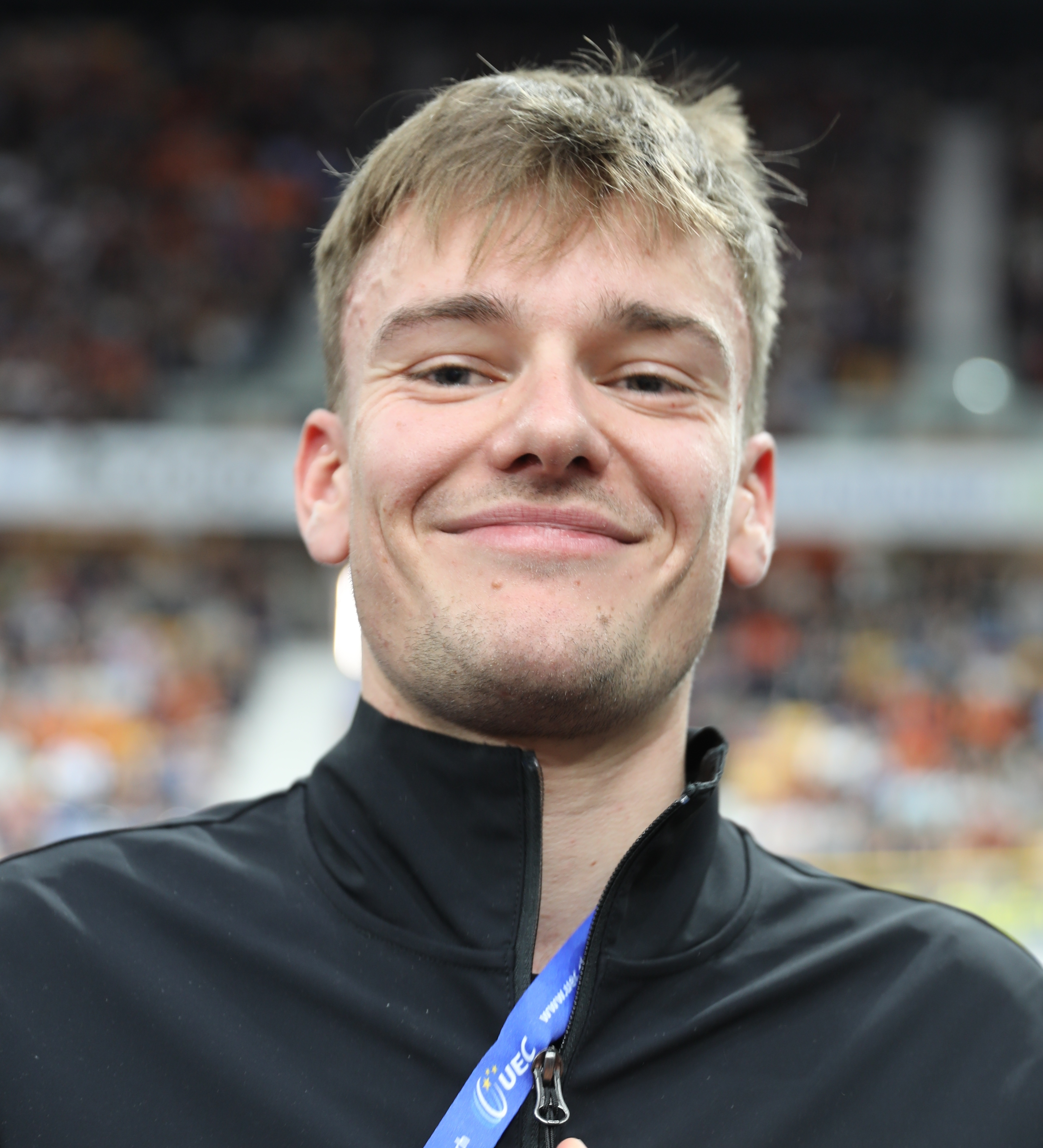
- Bögli in 2024

Personal information
- Born: 1 August 1996 (age 30)

Cycling career
- Sport: Cycling
- Current team: Elite Fondations Cycling Team
- Disciplines: Road; Track
- Role: Rider
Medal record
Representing Switzerland
Men's track cycling
European Championships
| Silver medal – second place | 2026 Konya | Team pursuit |
| Bronze medal – third place | 2025 Heusden-Zolder | Team pursuit |

Noah Bögli (born 1 August 1996) is a Swiss road and track racing cyclist, who currently rides for club team Elite Fondations Cycling Team. He was a bronze medalist at the 2025 UEC European Track Championships.

== Career ==
From Nods, Switzerland, he won overall victory in the six-part Swiss Cup for elite road cyclists at the Tour du Jura (Switzerland) in 2021. That year, he also won the time trial in Fulenbach amongst seven victories.

He was selected to ride for Switzerland at the 2023 UEC European Track Championships. He was runner-up in the prologue at the Tour de la Mirabelle in May 2024 riding for Elite Fondations.

In January 2025, he won the Swiss championship points race. He was a bronze medalist at the 2025 UEC European Track Championships in the Men's team pursuit in Belgium, in February 2025, alongside Mats Poot, Alex Vogel and Pascal Tappeiner. The following year, he upgraded to a silver in the men's team pursuit at the 2026 UEC European Track Championships in Konya, Turkey, in February 2026, riding alongside Vogel, Luca Bühlmann and Poot, finishing runner-up to Denmark.

== Major results ==
=== Track ===
2025
3rd Team pursuit, UEC European Championships
2026
2nd Team pursuit, UEC European Championships
