= Raphael Kokas =

Austrian cyclist (born 2004)

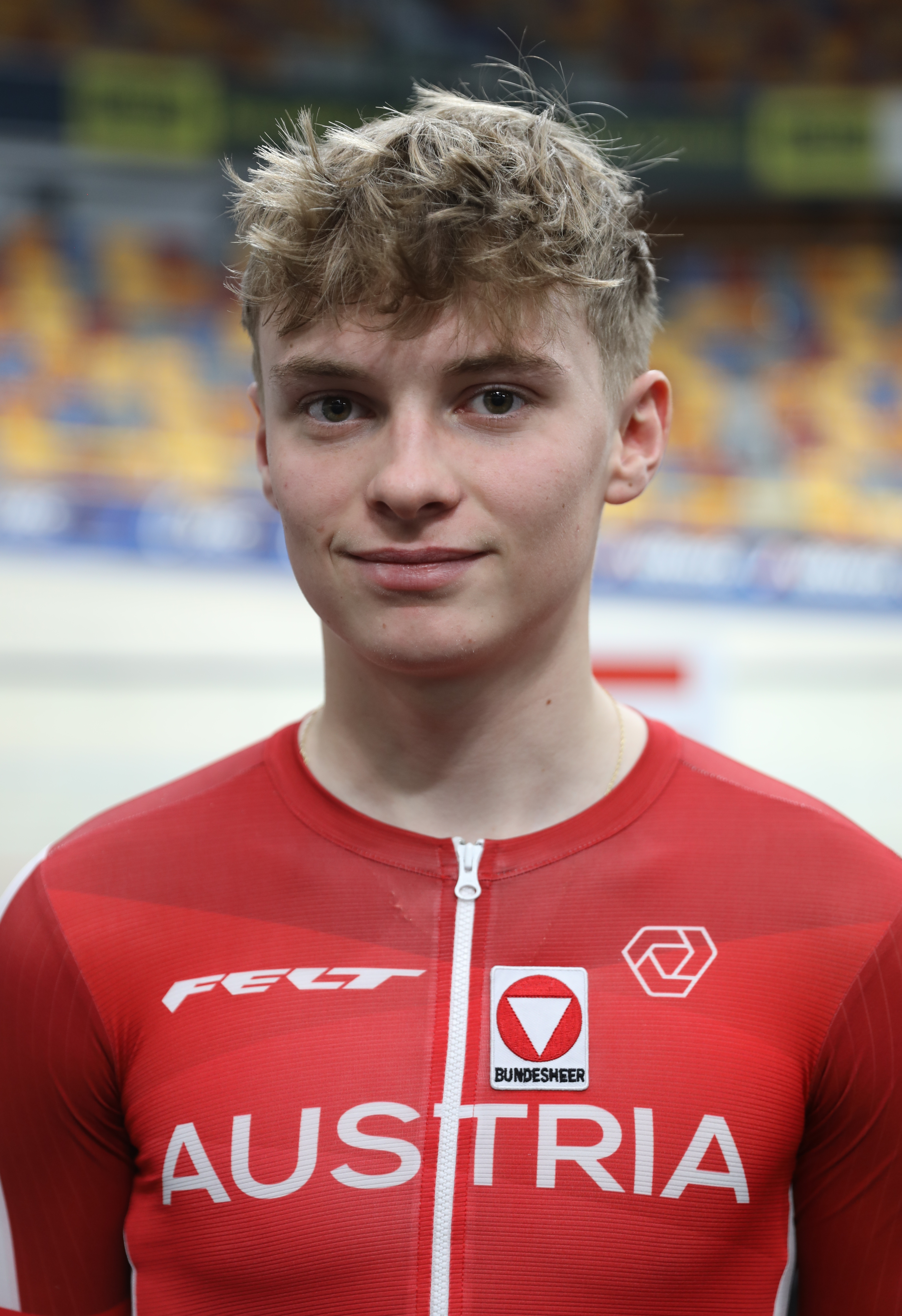
- Kokas in 2024

Personal information
- Born: 7 November 2004 (age 21)

Cycling career
- Sport: Cycling
- Disciplines: Track; Road

Amateur team
- 2023–: ARBÖ MiKo PV ON-Fahrrad
Medal record
Men's track cycling
Representing Austria
European U23 Championships
Gold medal – first place	2023 Anadia	Madison
Gold medal – first place	2024 Cottbus	Madison

Raphael Kokas (born 7 November 2004) is an Austrian cyclist. He competed in the men's madison event at the 2024 Summer Olympics.

== Major results ==
=== Track ===
2023
1st Madison, UEC European Under-23 Championships (with Maximilian Schmidbauer)
2024
1st Madison, UEC European Under-23 Championships (with Tim Wafler)

=== Road ===
Kokas at 2026 Tour of Romania

2023
9th Overall Tour of Kosovo
