= Pascal Tappeiner =

Swiss cyclist (born 2003)

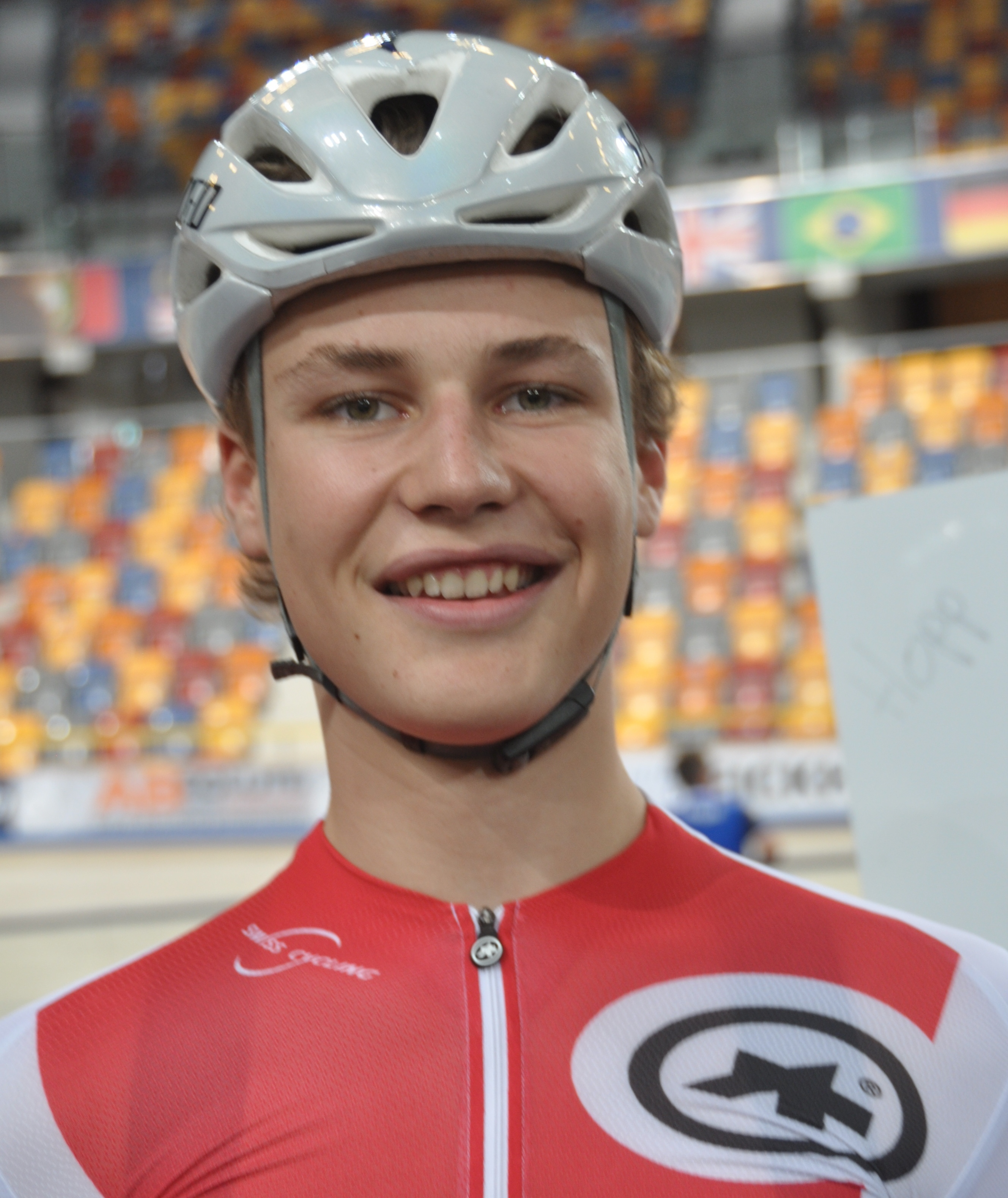
- Tappeiner in 2021

Personal information
- Born: 21 July 2003 (age 23)

Cycling career
- Sport: Cycling
- Discipline: Track
- Role: Rider
Medal record
Representing Switzerland
Men's track cycling
European Championships
Silver medal – second place	2026 Konya	Team pursuit
Bronze medal – third place	2025 Heusden-Zolder	Team pursuit
World Junior Championships
Silver medal – second place	2021 Cairo	Scratch

Pascal Tappeiner (born 21 July 2003) is a Swiss track racing cyclist. He was a bronze medalist at the 2025 UEC European Track Championships.

== Career ==
From Züberwangen, St Gallen, he won a silver medal at the 2021 UCI Junior Track Cycling World Championships in the scratch race in Cairo, Egypt.

He was a bronze medalist at the 2025 UEC European Track Championships in the Men's team pursuit in Belgium, in February 2025, competing alongside Noah Bögli, Alex Vogel and Mats Poot. The following year, he was part of the Swiss team that won a silver in the men's team pursuit at the 2026 UEC European Track Championships in Konya, Turkey, in February 2026, riding alongside Vogel, Poot and Luca Bühlmann and Bögli, as the team finished runner-up to Denmark in the gold medal race.

== Major results ==
=== Track ===
2025
3rd Team pursuit, UEC European Championships
2026
2nd Team pursuit, UEC European Championships
