= Noah Hobbs =

British cyclist

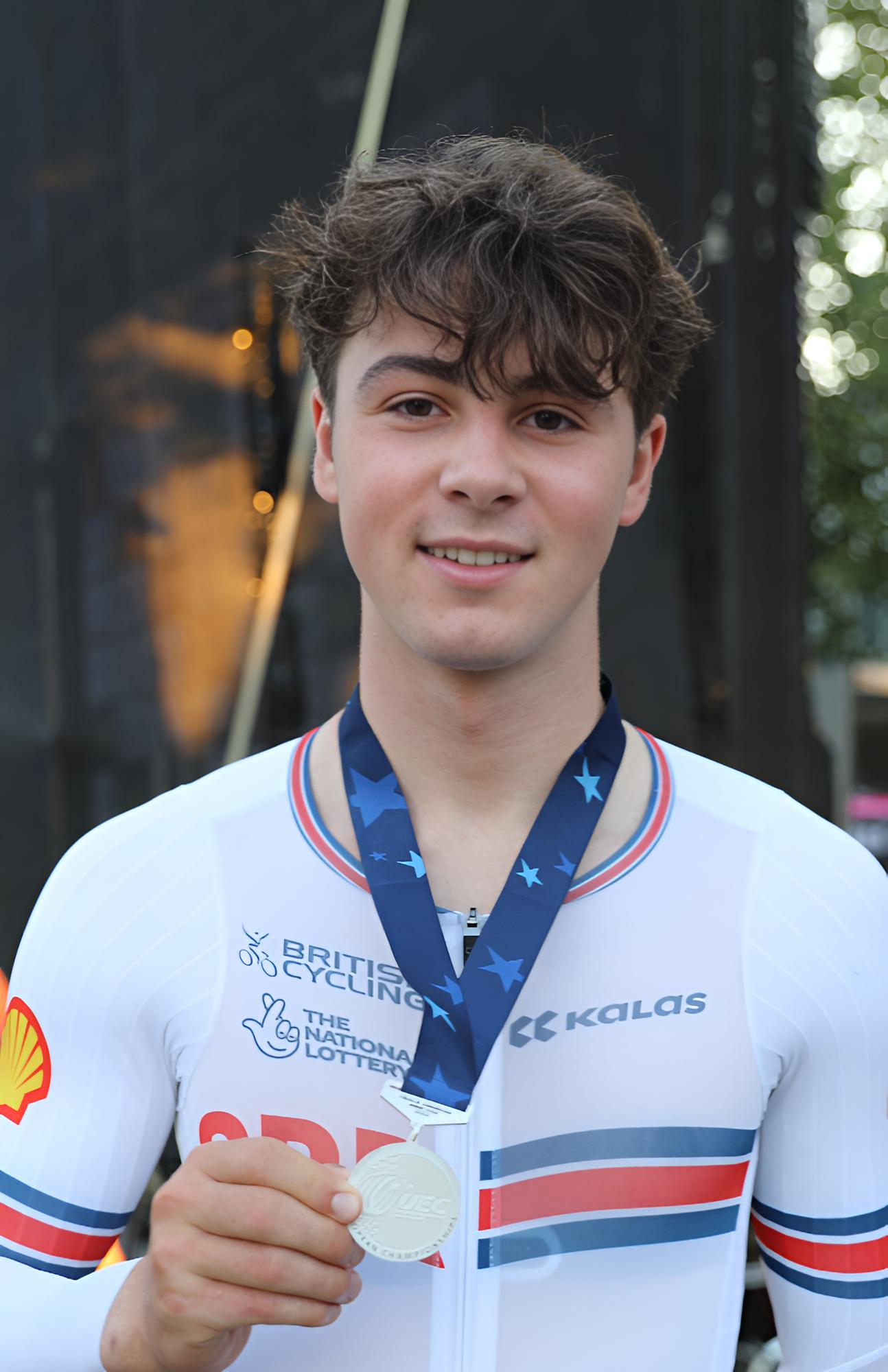
- Noah Hobbs (2024)

Personal information
- Full name: Alfred Bruce Noah Hobbs
- Born: 23 July 2004 (age 22) Barnstaple, England
- Height: 1.75 m (5 ft 9 in)
- Weight: 67 kg (148 lb; 10.6 st)

Cycling career
- Sport: Cycling
- Current team: EF Education–EasyPost
- Disciplines: Road, track
- Role: Rider
- Rider type: Sprinter (road), pursuitist (track)

Amateur teams
- 2021–2022: Bäckstedt Bike Performance JRT
- 2022: Tekkerz CC

Professional teams
- 2023–2024: Équipe Continentale Groupama–FDJ
- 2025: EF Education–Aevolo
- 2026-: EF Education–EasyPost
Medal record
Men's track cycling
Representing Great Britain
World Championships
Bronze medal – third place	2026 Shanghai	Team pursuit
European Championships
Silver medal – second place	2025 Heusden-Zolder	Team pursuit
European Under-23 Championships
Gold medal – first place	2025 Anadia	Team Pursuit
Bronze medal – third place	2025 Anadia	Madison

Noah Hobbs (born Alfred Bruce Noah Hobbs, 23 July 2004) is an English road racing and track cyclist who currently rides for UCI World Tour team EF Education-EasyPost. His career highlights include leading the 2023 Arctic Race of Norway after Stage 2 and winning a gold medal in the under-23 Team Pursuit at the 2023 UEC European Track Championships.

Hobbs has described himself as a sprinter, but one who can "get over some climbs that some of the other pure sprinters might struggle on." He also trains with the Great Britain track squad at the National Cycling Centre in Manchester and was selected to ride for the Great Britain squad at the 2023 Tour of Britain.

== Career ==
Hobbs joined Groupama–FDJ Continental Team for the 2022 season and finished the year with a strong performance at the Keizer der Juniores, an age-category event in Belgium. He finished second on Stage 2 and won the third and final stage on his way to third-place finishes in both the overall and mountain classifications.

He continued with the team for the 2023 season and made his breakthrough in a professional race at the 2023 Arctic Race of Norway. Hobbs started strongly, finishing second on Stage 1 after losing out to Alberto Dainese in the final sprint into Alta. He finished 25th on Stage 2 but gained five bonus seconds courtesy of first and second place finishes on intermediate sprints, giving him a one-second general classification lead over Dainese and stage winner Michele Gazzoli. As well as wearing the leader's "Midnight Sun" jersey, he also led the points and youth classifications at the halfway point of the race. Hobbs fell back on the hillier terrain of Stage 3 which was won by eventual overall winner Stephen Williams. He finished the race in 67th place overall and was third in the final points standings.

He represented Great Britain at elite level for the first time at the 2024 UCI Track Cycling World Championships in Denmark.

Hobbs took his first professional road win at the 2026 Heistse Pijl.

Hobbs was a member of Great Britain's team pursuit line-up who claimed the bronze medal at the 2026 UCI Track Cycling World Championships.

== Major results ==
=== Road ===
2021
3rd Road race, National Junior Championships
2022
1st Overall Junior Tour of Wales

1st Stages 2 & 3

1st Overall Isle of Man Junior Tour

1st Prologue & Stage 1

3rd Overall Keizer der Juniores

1st Stage 2b

2023
3rd Ronde van de Achterhoek
4th Gent–Wevelgem Beloften
2024
Alpes Isère Tour

1st Points classification
1st Stages 1 & 3

Tour Alsace

1st Points classification
1st Stage 5

3rd Circuit race, National Championships
4th Paris–Troyes
6th Grand Prix de la Ville de Lillers
9th Paris–Tours Espoirs
2025
1st Overall Volta ao Alentejo

1st Points classification
1st Young rider classification
1st Stages 1 & 3

Tour de l'Avenir

1st Points classification
1st Stage 1

1st Stage 4 Grand Prix Jeseníky
1st Sprints classification, International Tour of Rhodes
7th Overall Tour de Bretagne

1st Points classification
1st Stages 2, 6 & 7

2026 (2 pro wins)
1st Heistse Pijl
1st Stage 1 Tour de l'Ain
7th Hamburg Cyclassics
9th Kampioenschap van Vlaanderen

=== Track ===
2022
UEC European Junior Championships

2nd Omnium
3rd Team pursuit

2023
1st Team pursuit, UEC European Under-23 Championships
2024
UEC European Under-23 Championships

1st Scratch
2nd Madison (with Ben Wiggins)
2nd Omnium

3rd Points race, National Championships
2025
UEC European Under-23 Championships

1st Team pursuit
3rd Madison (with Ben Wiggins)

1st Scratch, National Championships
2026
3rd Team pursuit, UCI World Championships
