= Michael Gill (cyclist) =

British road cyclist

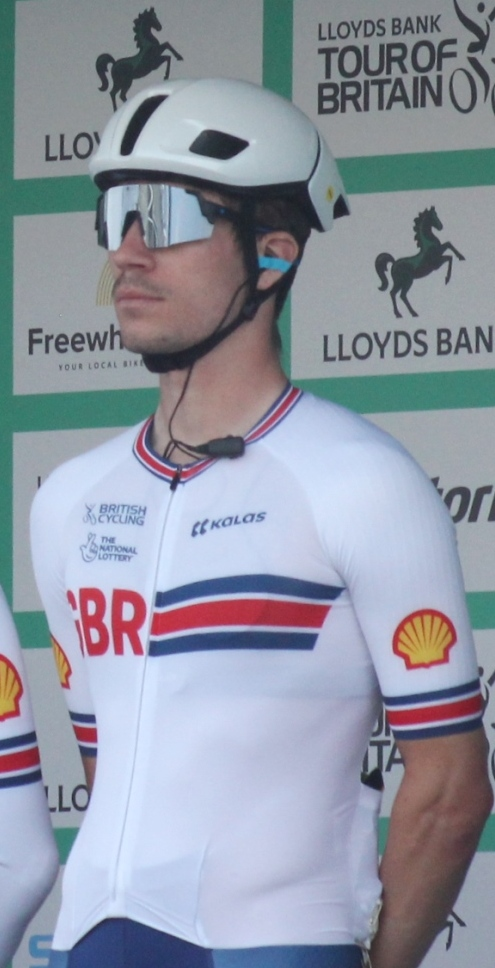
- Gill in 2024

Personal information
- Full name: Michael Gill
- Born: 13 June 1998 (age 28) Ponteland, Northumberland

Cycling career
- Sport: Cycling
- Disciplines: Road; Track
- Role: Rider
- Rider type: Time trialist

Amateur teams
- 2017–2018: EMC
- 2019: AeroLab Ward WheelZ
- 2020: Leisure Lakes Bikes.com
- 2021: Saint Piran Development

Professional teams
- 2022: Saint Piran
- 2023-2023: HUUB WattShop
- 2024-: Das Richardsons
Medal record
Men's track cycling
Representing Great Britain
European Championships
Silver medal – second place	2025 Heusden-Zolder	Team pursuit
Bronze medal – third place	2025 Heusden-Zolder	Individual pursuit

Michael Gill (born 13 June 1998) is a cyclist from England, who last rode for UCI Continental team Saint Piran in road racing and HUUB WattShop on the track. Gill now rides for Das Richardsons, an elite development team.

== Early life and education ==
Gill is a former world champion in gymnastics. As part of a quartet of gymnasts, he won the 2014 FIG Acrobatic Gymnastics World Age Group Championship held in Paris. Gill is also a silver medallist at the 2013 European Gymnastics Championships. Gill graduated from the University of Nottingham in 2019 with degrees in Economics and Business and Management.

== Cycling career ==
At the 2023 British Cycling National Track Championships, Gill won two silver medals in the Individual Pursuit and the Team Pursuit. He had previously won a bronze medal in the team pursuit at the 2020 British National Track Championships when riding with the AeroLab Ward WheelZ team.

At the 2024 British Cycling National Track Championships, he won the Individual Pursuit title.

== Major results ==
=== Road ===
2018
1st Manilla Presca Autumn Series #3
1st Manilla Presca Autumn Series #4
2nd Tyneside Vagabonds Spring Crits
2nd Muckle CC Men's Road Race
2019
1st The Bike-Inn and Avion Spring Shield 1
1st The Bike-Inn and Avion Spring Shield 3
1st The Prima Hetton Circuit Series Round 1
2nd EMMR: UoN Harvey Hadden #1
2nd Blaydon Road Race
3rd Boompods Summer Evening Criterium #2
2nd Scottish National Senior Track Championships
3rd Peter Taylor Memorial Road Race
2021
2nd Worcester Classic Road Race
3rd Mark Evans Memorial Series 2
3rd Darley Moor Race #8
2022
3rd East Midlands Regional Road Race Championships

=== Track ===
2020
3rd Team pursuit, National Championships
2023
National Championships

2nd Individual pursuit
2nd Team pursuit

2024
National Championships

1st Individual pursuit
2nd Team pursuit

2025
UEC European Championships

2nd Team pursuit
3rd Individual pursuit

2nd Individual pursuit, National Championships
