= 2026 UEC European Track Championships =

Cycling championships

- Venue: Konya, Turkey
- Date: 1–5 February
- Velodrome: Konya Velodrome
- Events: 22 (11 women, 11 men)

The 2026 UEC European Track Championships was the seventeenth edition of the elite UEC European Track Championships in track cycling and took place at the Konya Velodrome in Konya, Turkey, from 1 to 5 February 2026.

== Schedule ==
Competition	F	Final

Men
Date →	Sun 1		Mon 2		Tue 3		Wed 4		Thu 5
Event ↓	A	E	A	E	A	E	A	E	A
Sprint					Q, ^{1}/_{16}, ^{1}/_{8}	QF		SF, F	
Team sprint	Q	R1, F							
Team pursuit	Q		R1	F					
Keirin									R1, R, SF, F
Omnium							Q, SR, TR	ER, PR	
Madison									F
1 km time trial			Q	F					
Pursuit					Q	F			
Points race				F					
Scratch					Q	F			
Elimination race	Q	F							

Women
Date →	Sun 1		Mon 2		Tue 3		Wed 4		Thu 5
Event ↓	A	E	A	E	A	E	A	E	A
Sprint			Q, ^{1}/_{16}, ^{1}/_{8}	QF		SF, F			
Team sprint	Q	R1, F							
Team pursuit	Q		R1	F					
Keirin									R1, R, SF, F
Omnium					SR, TR	ER, PR			
Madison									F
1 km time trial							Q	F	
Pursuit							Q	F	
Points race								F	
Scratch		F							
Elimination race				F					

A = Afternoon session, E = Evening session
Q = qualifiers, R1 = first round, R = repechages, ^{1}/_{16} = sixteenth finals, ^{1}/_{8} = eighth finals, QF = quarterfinals, SF = semifinals,
SR = Scratch Race, TR = Tempo Race, ER = Elimination Race, PR = Points Race

== Events ==
Event	Gold		Silver		Bronze	
Men's events
Sprint	Matthew Richardson; Great Britain		Harrie Lavreysen; Netherlands		Nikita Kiriltsev; Individual Neutral Athletes	
Team sprint	France; Timmy Gillion; Rayan Helal; Étienne Oliviero; Tom Derache	41.789^{G}	Great Britain; Matthew Richardson; Joseph Truman; Hamish Turnbull; Harry Radford	41.795^{G}	Italy; Matteo Bianchi; Stefano Minuta; Mattia Predomo	42.285^{B}
Team pursuit	Denmark; Tobias Hansen; Lasse Norman Leth; Rasmus Pedersen; Frederik Rodenberg; Robin Juel Skivild	3:42.330^{G}	Switzerland; Noah Bögli; Luca Bühlmann; Mats Poot; Alex Vogel; Pascal Tappeiner	3:47.033^{G}	Great Britain; Matthew Bostock; Henry Hobbs; William Tidball; Oliver Wood; Ben Wiggins	caught opponent^{B}
Keirin	Matthew Richardson; Great Britain		Harrie Lavreysen; Netherlands		Lowie Nulens; Belgium	
Omnium	Iúri Leitão; Portugal	140 pts	Yanne Dorenbos; Netherlands	131 pts	Roger Kluge; Germany	126 pts
Madison	Germany; Moritz Augenstein; Roger Kluge	85 pts	Portugal; Iúri Leitão; Diogo Narciso	55 pts	Belgium; Jasper De Buyst; Jules Hesters	38 pts
1 km time trial^{[N]}	Joseph Truman; Great Britain	57.541	Étienne Oliviero; France	58.078	David Peterka; Czech Republic	58.355
Individual pursuit^{[N]}	Lev Gonov; Individual Neutral Athletes	4:03.491^{G}	Robin Juel Skivild; Denmark	4:05.577^{G}	Renato Favero; Italy	4:01.749^{B}
Points race^{[O]}	Tim Torn Teutenberg; Germany	106 pts	Conrad Haugsted; Denmark	102 pts	Jasper De Buyst; Belgium	98 pts
Scratch^{[O]}	Alex Vogel; Switzerland		Ilya Savekin; Individual Neutral Athletes		Vincent Hoppezak; Netherlands	
Elimination race^{[O]}	Tobias Hansen; Denmark		Tim Torn Teutenberg; Germany		Jules Hesters; Belgium	
Women's events
Sprint	Emma Finucane; Great Britain		Sophie Capewell; Great Britain		Alina Lysenko; Individual Neutral Athletes	
Team sprint	Germany; Lea Friedrich; Pauline Grabosch; Clara Schneider	45.710^{G}	Great Britain; Sophie Capewell; Rhianna Parris-Smith; Lowri Thomas; Lauren Bell	45.713^{G}	Netherlands; Kimberly Kalee; Hetty van de Wouw; Steffie van der Peet	45.736^{B}
Team pursuit	Great Britain; Katie Archibald; Millie Couzens; Josie Knight; Anna Morris; Kate Richardson	4:02.808^{G} WR	Germany; Franziska Brauße; Lisa Klein; Mieke Kröger; Laura Süßemilch	4:05.448^{G}	Italy; Elisa Balsamo; Letizia Paternoster; Linda Sanarini; Federica Venturelli	4:09.961^{B}
Keirin	Alina Lysenko; Individual Neutral Athletes		Mathilde Gros; France		Lea Friedrich; Germany	
Omnium	Anna Morris; Great Britain	132 pts	Anita Stenberg; Norway	119 pts	Shari Bossuyt; Belgium	119 pts
Madison	Belgium; Lotte Kopecky; Shari Bossuyt	50 pts	Great Britain; Katie Archibald; Anna Morris	27 pts	Italy; Elisa Balsamo; Federica Venturelli	26 pts
1 km time trial^{[N]}	Mathilde Gros; France	1:03.682	Miriam Vece; Italy	1:04.106	Yana Burlakova; Individual Neutral Athletes	1:04.171
Individual pursuit^{[N]}	Josie Knight; Great Britain	4:22.353^{G}	Federica Venturelli; Italy	4:27.891^{G}	Millie Couzens; Great Britain	4:24.342^{B}
Points race^{[O]}	Lotte Kopecky; Belgium	45 pts	Victoire Berteau; France	38 pts	Sofie van Rooijen; Netherlands	33 pts
Scratch^{[O]}	Hélène Hesters; Belgium		Aline Seitz; Switzerland		Lena Charlotte Reißner; Germany	
Elimination race^{[O]}	Lotte Kopecky; Belgium		Victoire Berteau; France		Lea Lin Teutenberg; Germany	

- Competitors named in italics only participated in rounds prior to the final.
- ^{^{N}} These events are not contested in the Olympics.
- ^{^{O}} In the Olympics, these events are contested within the omnium only.

== Medal table ==
* Host nation (Turkey)

Rank	Nation	Gold	Silver	Bronze	Total
1	Great Britain	7	4	2	13
2	Belgium	4	0	5	9
3	Germany	3	2	4	9
4	France	2	4	0	6
5	Denmark	2	2	0	4
–	Individual Neutral Athletes	2	1	3	6
6	Switzerland	1	2	0	3
7	Portugal	1	1	0	2
8	Netherlands	0	3	3	6
9	Italy	0	2	4	6
10	Norway	0	1	0	1
11	Czech Republic	0	0	1	1
Totals (11 entries)		22	22	22	66
