= Erik Martorell =

Spanish cyclist (born 1988)

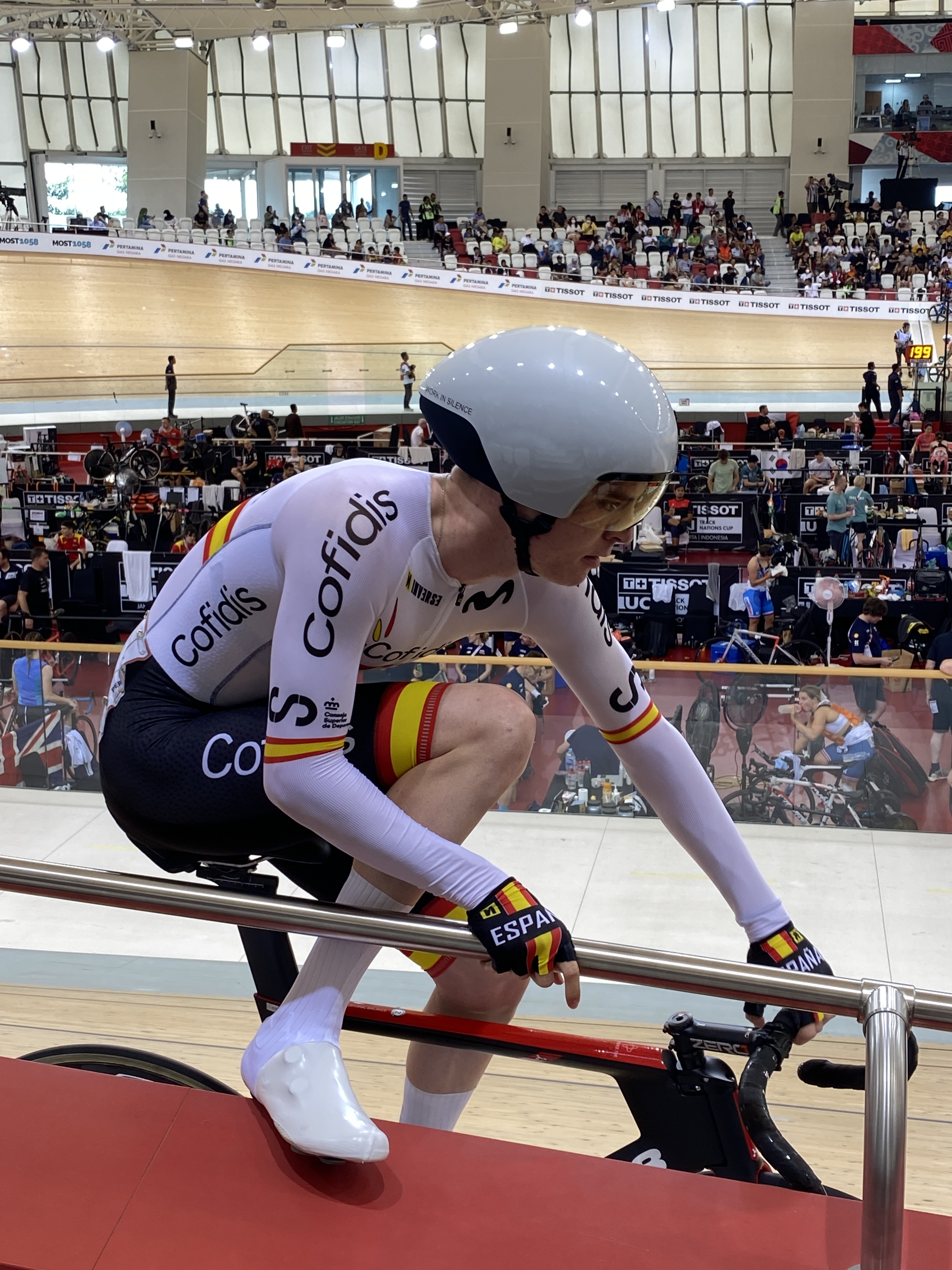

Personal information
- Full name: Erik Martorell Haga
- Born: 26 June 1998 (age 28) Barcelona, Spain
- Height: 187 cm (6 ft 2 in)

Cycling career
- Sport: Cycling
- Current team: El Bicho - Prime Numbers
- Disciplines: Track; Road
- Role: Rider

Amateur teams
- 2017: Compak–Campo Claro
- 2018–2020: Electro Hiper Europa–Ristrasol
- 2021-2022: Team MP Group
- 2023: Baqué Cycling Team
- 2024: El Bicho - Prime Numbers

Professional team
- 2022: Manuela Fundación

Erik Martorell Haga (born 26 June 1998) is a Spanish/Norwegian road and track cyclist, who currently rides for Spanish amateur team El Bicho - Prime Numbers. He competed in four events at the 2021 UCI Track Cycling World Championships.

== Major results - Track ==
2016
CN Spain Junior – Lluís Puig Velodrome

2nd Points Race
3rd Team Sprint

2017
3rd, Festa Major de Sants-Barcelona

2019
2nd Scratch, National Track Championships
2020
National Track Championships

3rd Scratch
3rd Individual pursuit

2021
National Track Championships

1st Omnium
1st Individual pursuit
1st Elimination race
3rd Madison

UCI Nations Cup

2nd Elimination race – Hong Kong

2022
UCI Nations Cup

2nd Scratch – Milton

National Track Championships

3rd Omnium
3rd Madison
