= Davide Boscaro =

Italian cyclist (born 2000)

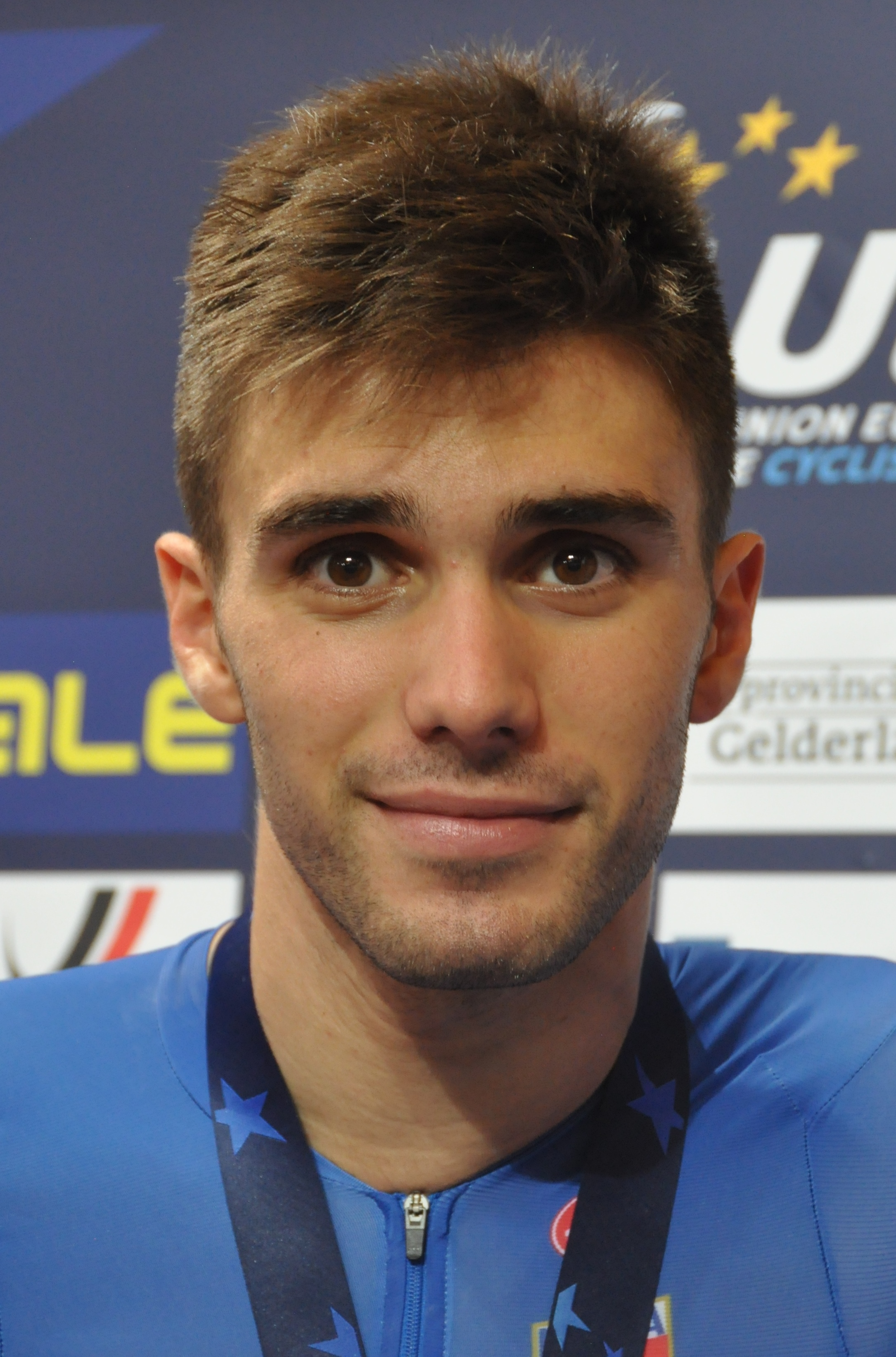
- Boscaro in 2021

Personal information
- Born: 13 July 2000 (age 26) Padua, Italy
- Height: 1.82 m (6 ft 0 in)
- Weight: 77 kg (170 lb)

Cycling career
- Sport: Cycling
- Current team: MBH Bank CSB Telecom Fort
- Disciplines: Road; Track
- Role: Rider
- Rider type: Sprinter

Professional team
- 2021–: Team Colpack–Ballan
Medal record
Men's track cycling
Representing Italy
European Championships
Bronze medal – third place	2024 Apeldoorn	Team pursuit

Davide Boscaro (born 13 July 2000) is an Italian road and track cyclist, who currently rides for UCI Continental team MBH Bank CSB Telecom Fort.

== Major results ==
=== Track ===
2018
National Junior Championships

1st Omnium
1st Kilo

2nd Team pursuit, UEC European Junior Championships
2019
2nd Sprint, National Championships
2020
2nd Team pursuit, UEC European Under-23 Championships
2nd Team pursuit, UCI World Cup, Milton
2021
1st Keirin, National Championships
2nd Team pursuit, UCI Nations Cup, St. Petersburg
3rd Team pursuit, UEC European Under-23 Championships
2023
2nd Team pursuit, UCI Nations Cup, Milton
2024
3rd Team pursuit, UEC European Championships
3rd Team pursuit, UCI Nations Cup, Adelaide

=== Road ===
2018
1st Stage 2 Tre Giorni Ciclista Bresciana
2021
3rd Vicenza–Bionde
7th Circuito del Porto
2023
3rd Trofeo Antonietto Rancilio
10th Vuelta a Formosa Internacional

1st Stage 4b
