= Robin Juel Skivild =

Danish cyclist

Robin Skivild
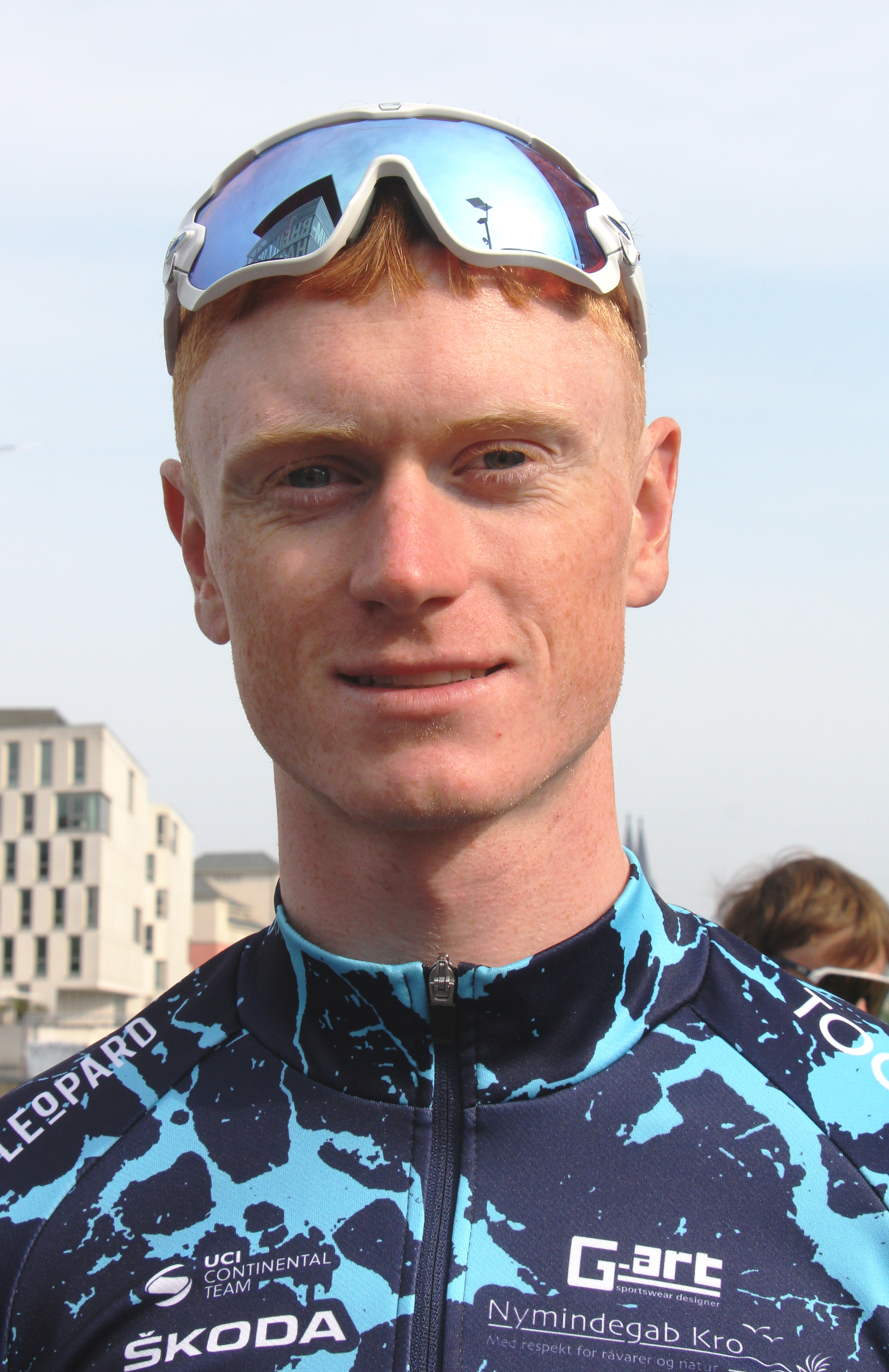
- Skivild (2023)

Personal information
- Full name: Robin Juel Skivild
- Born: 21 August 2001 (age 25) Ryslinge, Denmark
- Height: 1.83 m (6 ft 0 in)

Cycling career
- Sport: Cycling
- Current team: Team Odense
- Disciplines: Track; Road
- Role: Rider

Amateur teams
- 2012–2017: Cykling Odense
- 2018: Herning CK Junior
- 2019: Team Mascot Workwear
- 2020: Team AURA Energi–JS.dk
- 2024–: Team Odense

Professional teams
- 2021–2022: Uno-X Dare Development Team
- 2023: Leopard TOGT Pro Cycling
Medal record
Men's track cycling
Representing Denmark
European Championships
Gold medal – first place	2025 Heusden-Zolder	Team pursuit
Gold medal – first place	2026 Konya	Team pursuit
Silver medal – second place	2022 Munich	Team pursuit
Silver medal – second place	2026 Konya	Individual pursuit

Robin Juel Skivild (born 21 August 2001) is a Danish road and track cyclist, who currently rides for club team Team Odense.

== Major results ==
=== Road ===
2018
4th Overall SPIE Internationale Juniorendriedaagse

1st Mountains classification
1st Young rider classification

7th Johan Museeuw Classic
2019
1st Mountains classification, SPIE Internationale Juniorendriedaagse
8th Overall Saarland Trofeo
2021
1st Mountains classification, Tour Poitou-Charentes en Nouvelle-Aquitaine
2022
1st Mountains classification, Giro della Valle d'Aosta
10th Sundvolden GP

=== Track ===
2018
3rd Points race, UCI World Junior Championships
2022
2nd Team pursuit, UEC European Championships
2025
1st Team pursuit, UEC European Championships
2026
UEC European Championships

1st Team pursuit
2nd Individual pursuit
