= Luca Bühlmann =

Swiss cyclist (born 2005)

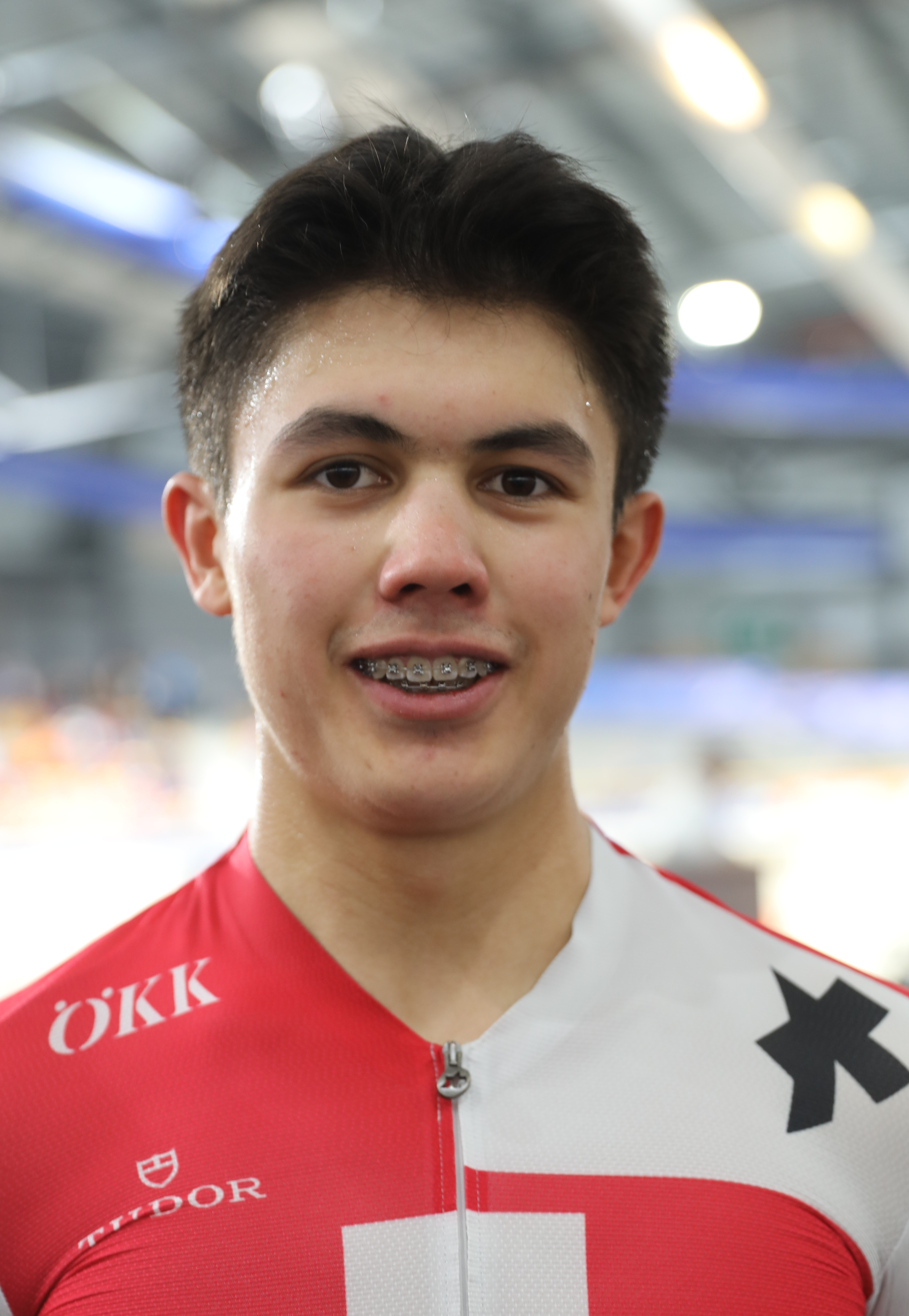
- Bühlmann in 2024

Personal information
- Born: 12 June 2005 (age 21)

Cycling career
- Sport: Cycling
- Current team: Velo Club Mendrisio
- Disciplines: Road; Track
- Role: Rider

Amateur teams
- 2022: Talent Romandie
- 2024: VC Lugano
- 2025–: Velo Club Mendrisio
Medal record
Representing Switzerland
Men's track cycling
European Championships
Silver medal – second place	2026 Konya	Team pursuit

Luca Bühlmann (born 12 June 2005) is a Swiss track cyclist who currently rides for club team Velo Club Mendrisio. He was a silver medalist in the men's team pursuit at the 2026 UEC European Track Championships.

== Career ==
Bühlmann competed for Switzerland at the 2023 UCI Junior Track Cycling World Championships in Cali, Colombia. At the championships, be was part of the team pursuit squad with Victor Benareau, Arthur Guillet, and Mats Poot that secured a fourth place finish, defeated by the Canadian team in the bronze medal race. Bühlmann also had a top-eight finish in the individual pursuit, and set a new Swiss junior record in the kilometre time trial.

In April 2024, at the age of 18 years-old, he placed third in the point race at the Life's an Omnium Madison in Switzerland, finishing behind Michele Scartezzini and Elia Viviani, part of the 2024 UCI Track Cycling season.

Bühlmann won a silver in the men's team pursuit at the 2026 UEC European Track Championships in Konya, Turkey, in February 2026, riding alongside Alex Vogel, Mats Poot and Noah Bögli, finishing runner-up to Denmark.

== Major results ==
=== Track ===
2026
2nd Team pursuit, UEC European Championships
