= Alex Vogel =

Swiss cyclist (born 1999)

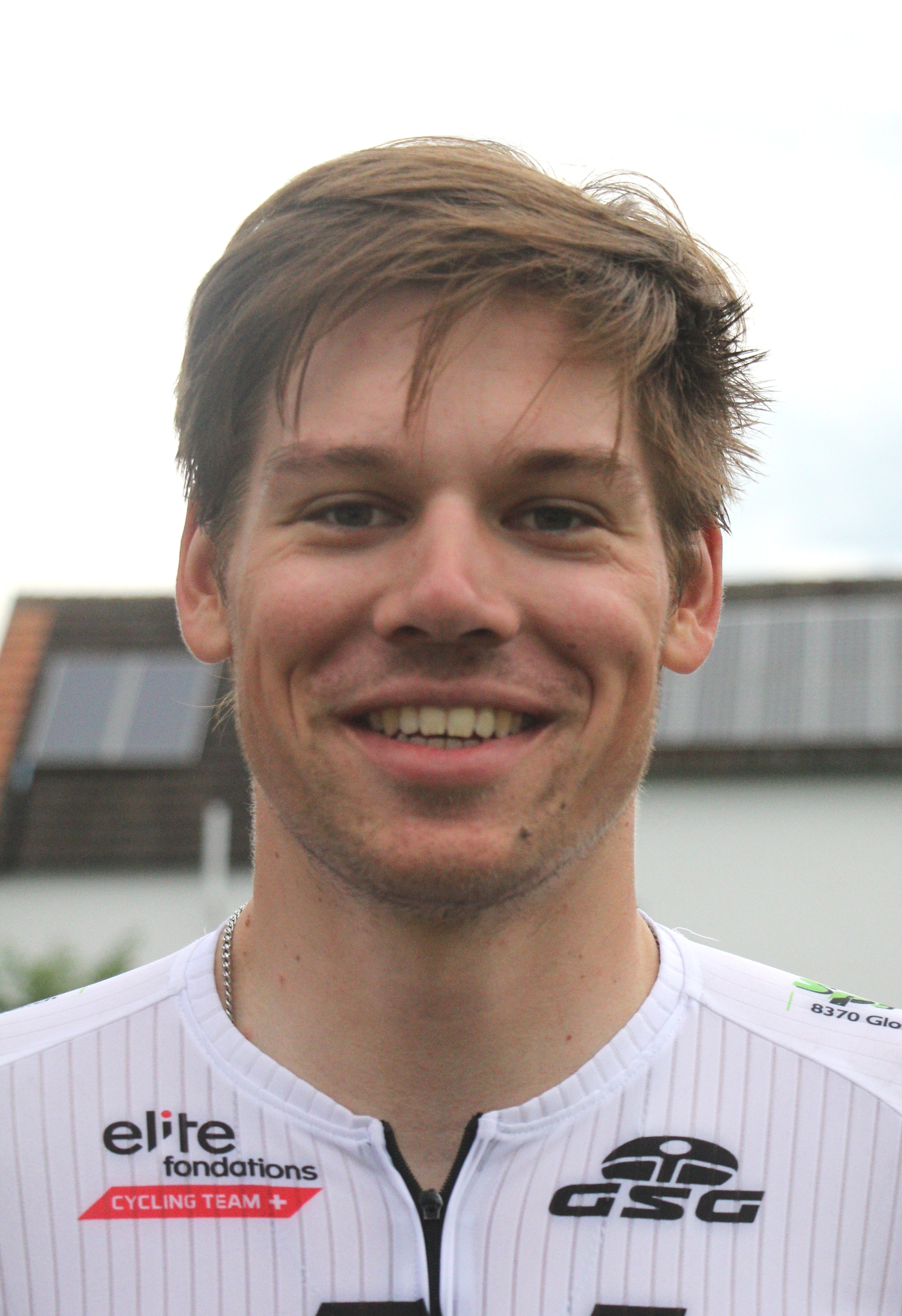
- Vogel in 2023

Personal information
- Born: 30 July 1999 (age 27)
- Height: 1.82 m (6 ft 0 in)
- Weight: 80 kg (176 lb)

Cycling career
- Sport: Cycling
- Current team: Elite Fondations Cycling Team
- Disciplines: Road; Track
- Role: Rider

Amateur teams
- 2018: Swiss Racing Academy
- 2023–: Elite Fondations Cycling Team

Professional team
- 2019–2022: Swiss Racing Academy
Medal record
Representing Switzerland
Men's track cycling
European Championships
Gold medal – first place	2026 Konya	Scratch
Silver medal – second place	2021 Grenchen	Team pursuit
Silver medal – second place	2026 Konya	Team pursuit
Bronze medal – third place	2025 Heusden-Zolder	Team pursuit

Alex Vogel (born 30 July 1999) is a Swiss cyclist, who currently rides for club team Elite Fondations Cycling Team.

== Major results ==
=== Road ===
2017
10th Road race, UEC European Junior Championships
2020
5th Overall Orlen Nations Grand Prix
5th Time trial, National Under-23 Championships
2021
1st Prologue Tour du Pays de Montbéliard
2nd Time trial, National Under-23 Championships
6th Cholet-Pays de la Loire
2022
5th Time trial, National Championships

=== Track ===
2017
UEC European Junior Championships

2nd Omnium
3rd Team pursuit

2018
National Championships

3rd Points race
3rd Elimination

2019
3rd Team pursuit, UEC European Under-23 Championships
3rd Team pursuit, UCI World Cup, Hong Kong
2020
1st Omnium, National Championships
2nd Omnium, UEC European Under-23 Championships
2021
2nd Team pursuit, UEC European Championships
2022
3rd Kilometer, National Championships
2023
National Championships

1st Elimination
2nd Madison

2024
1st Scratch, National Championships
2025
3rd Team pursuit, UEC European Championships
