= 2022 UCI Track Cycling World Championships – Men's team pursuit =

Men's team pursuit at the 2022 UCI Track Cycling World Championships
- Venue: Vélodrome National
- Location: Saint-Quentin-en-Yvelines, France
- Dates: 12–13 October
- Competitors: 67 from 16 nations
- Teams: 16

Medalists
gold medal	Ethan Hayter; Oliver Wood; Ethan Vernon; Daniel Bigham	Great Britain
silver medal	Simone Consonni; Filippo Ganna; Jonathan Milan; Manlio Moro; Francesco Lamon	Italy
bronze medal	Tobias Hansen; Carl-Frederik Bévort; Lasse Norman Hansen; Rasmus Pedersen	Denmark

The Men's team pursuit competition at the 2022 UCI Track Cycling World Championships was held on 12 and 13 October 2022.

== Results ==
=== Qualifying ===
The qualifying was started on 12 October at 15:18. The eight fastest teams advanced to the first round.

Rank	Nation	Time	Behind	Notes
1	Great Britain; Ethan Hayter; Oliver Wood; Ethan Vernon; Daniel Bigham	3:48.092		Q
2	Italy; Filippo Ganna; Francesco Lamon; Jonathan Milan; Manlio Moro	3:48.243	+0.151	Q
3	France; Benjamin Thomas; Valentin Tabellion; Thomas Denis; Quentin Lafargue	3:48.845	+0.753	Q
4	New Zealand; Aaron Gate; Tom Sexton; Nick Kergozou; Campbell Stewart	3:49.498	+1.406	Q
5	Denmark; Tobias Hansen; Carl-Frederik Bévort; Lasse Norman Hansen; Rasmus Pedersen	3:49.639	+1.547	Q
6	Australia; Conor Leahy; Kelland O'Brien; Joshua Duffy; Sam Welsford	3:50.344	+2.252	Q
7	Germany; Theo Reinhardt; Tobias Buck-Gramcko; Nicolas Heinrich; Leon Rohde	3:52.332	+4.240	Q
8	Belgium; Tuur Dens; Thibaut Bernard; Gianluca Pollefliet; Noah Vandenbranden	3:52.480	+4.388	Q
9	Japan; Shunsuke Imamura; Kazushige Kuboki; Naoki Kojima; Shoi Matsuda	3:53.494	+5.402	
10	Switzerland; Claudio Imhof; Simon Vitzthum; Valère Thiébaud; Alex Vogel	3:53.532	+5.440	
11	Canada; Dylan Bibic; Mathias Guillemette; Carson Mattern; Sean Richardson	3:53.739	+5.647	
12	Poland; Alan Banaszek; Kacper Majewski; Bartosz Rudyk; Szymon Sajnok	3:56.370	+8.278	
13	China; Li Boan; Sun Haijiao; Yang Yang; Zhang Haiao	3:57.565	+9.473	
14	United States; David Domonoske; Anders Johnson; Grant Koontz; Brendan Rhim	4:01.660	+13.568	
15	Spain; Erik Martorell; Joan Bennassar; Alberto Pérez; Jaime Romero	4:04.753	+16.661	
16	Uzbekistan; Dmitriy Bocharov; Edem Eminov; Danil Evdokimov; Aleksey Fomovskiy	4:13.067	+24.975	

=== First round ===
The first round was started on 12 October at 20:52.

First round heats were held as follows:
Heat 1: 6th v 7th fastest
Heat 2: 5th v 8th fastest
Heat 3: 2nd v 3rd fastest
Heat 4: 1st v 4th fastest

The winners of heats three and four advanced to the gold medal race. The remaining six teams were ranked on time, from which the top two proceeded to the bronze medal race.

Heat	Rank	Nation	Time	Behind	Notes
1	1	Australia; Conor Leahy; Kelland O'Brien; Sam Welsford; James Moriarty	3:48.773		QB
1	2	Germany; Theo Reinhardt; Tobias Buck-Gramcko; Nicolas Heinrich; Leon Rohde	3:52.057	+3.284	
2	1	Denmark; Tobias Hansen; Carl-Frederik Bévort; Lasse Norman Hansen; Rasmus Pedersen	3:46.754		QB
2	2	Belgium; Tuur Dens; Thibaut Bernard; Gianluca Pollefliet; Noah Vandenbranden	3:53.242	+6.488	
3	1	Italy; Filippo Ganna; Francesco Lamon; Jonathan Milan; Manlio Moro	3:47.203		QG
3	2	France; Benjamin Thomas; Valentin Tabellion; Corentin Ermenault; Quentin Lafargue	3:50.681	+3.478	
4	1	Great Britain; Ethan Hayter; Oliver Wood; Ethan Vernon; Daniel Bigham	3:47.057		QG
4	2	New Zealand; Aaron Gate; Tom Sexton; Nick Kergozou; Campbell Stewart	3:48.920	+1.863	

- QG = qualified for gold medal final
- QB = qualified for bronze medal final

=== Finals ===
The finals were started on 13 October at 19:25.

Rank	Nation	Time	Behind	Notes
Gold medal race
1st place, gold medalist(s)	Great Britain; Ethan Hayter; Oliver Wood; Ethan Vernon; Daniel Bigham	3:45.829		
2nd place, silver medalist(s)	Italy; Simone Consonni; Filippo Ganna; Jonathan Milan; Manlio Moro	3:46.033	+0.204	
Bronze medal race
3rd place, bronze medalist(s)	Denmark; Tobias Hansen; Carl-Frederik Bévort; Lasse Norman Hansen; Rasmus Pedersen	3:46.721		
4	Australia; Conor Leahy; Kelland O'Brien; Sam Welsford; James Moriarty	3:48.127	+1.406	
