= 2023 UEC European Track Championships – Men's team pursuit =

Men's team pursuit competition

Men's team pursuit at the 2023 UEC European Track Championships
- Venue: Tissot Velodrome, Grenchen
- Dates: 8–9 February
- Competitors: 43 from 10 nations
- Winning time: 3:47.667

Medalists
gold medal	Filippo Ganna; Francesco Lamon; Jonathan Milan; Manlio Moro; Simone Consonni	Italy
silver medal	Daniel Bigham; Charlie Tanfield; Ethan Vernon; Oliver Wood	Great Britain
bronze medal	Thomas Denis; Corentin Ermenault; Quentin Lafargue; Benjamin Thomas; Adrien Garel	France

The men's team pursuit competition at the 2023 UEC European Track Championships was held on 8 and 9 February 2023.

== Results ==
=== Qualifying ===
The eight fastest teams advanced to the first round.

Rank	Nation	Time	Behind	Notes
1	Italy; Simone Consonni; Filippo Ganna; Francesco Lamon; Jonathan Milan	3:49.582		Q
2	Great Britain; Daniel Bigham; Charlie Tanfield; Ethan Vernon; Oliver Wood	3:50.514	+0.932	Q
3	Denmark; Carl-Frederik Bévort; Niklas Larsen; Rasmus Pedersen; Theodor Storm	3:51.508	+1.926	Q
4	France; Thomas Denis; Corentin Ermenault; Adrien Garel; Benjamin Thomas	3:53.612	+4.030	Q
5	Germany; Benjamin Boos; Tobias Buck-Gramcko; Nicolas Heinrich; Theo Reinhardt	3:54.081	+4.499	q
6	Belgium; Thibaut Bernard; Tuur Dens; Gianluca Pollefliet; Noah Vandenbranden	3:55.583	+6.001	q
7	Switzerland; Noah Bögli; Claudio Imhof; Valère Thiébaud; Alex Vogel	3:57.463	+7.881	q
8	Poland; Kacper Majewski; Filip Prokopyszyn; Bartosz Rudyk; Szymon Sajnok	3:58.880	+9.298	q
9	Spain; Francesc Bennassar; Joan Martí Bennassar; Beñat Garaiar; Erik Martorell	4:05.082	+15.500	
10	Lithuania; Rokas Adomaitis; Justas Beniušis; Žygimantas Matuzevičius; Aivaras Mikutis	4:05.842	+16.260	

=== First round ===
First round heats were held as follows:
Heat 1: 6th v 7th fastest
Heat 2: 5th v 8th fastest
Heat 3: 2nd v 3rd fastest
Heat 4: 1st v 4th fastest

The winners of heats 3 and 4 proceeded to the gold medal race. The remaining six teams were ranked on time, from which the top two proceeded to the bronze medal race.

Heat	Rank	Nation	Time	Notes
1	1	Belgium; Thibaut Bernard; Tuur Dens; Gianluca Pollefliet; Noah Vandenbranden	3:51.482	
1	2	Switzerland; Noah Bögli; Claudio Imhof; Valère Thiébaud; Alex Vogel	3:57.059	
2	1	Germany; Benjamin Boos; Tobias Buck-Gramcko; Theo Reinhardt; Leon Rohde	3:52.069	
2	2	Poland; Kacper Majewski; Filip Prokopyszyn; Bartosz Rudyk; Szymon Sajnok	3:57.819	
3	1	Great Britain; Daniel Bigham; Charlie Tanfield; Ethan Vernon; Oliver Wood	3:48.504	QG
3	2	Denmark; Carl-Frederik Bévort; Niklas Larsen; Rasmus Pedersen; Theodor Storm	3:50.673	QB
4	1	Italy; Simone Consonni; Filippo Ganna; Jonathan Milan; Manlio Moro	3:48.333	QG
4	2	France; Thomas Denis; Corentin Ermenault; Quentin Lafargue; Benjamin Thomas	3:50.088	QB

=== Finals ===
Rank	Nation	Time	Behind	Notes
Gold medal final
1st place, gold medalist(s)	Italy; Filippo Ganna; Francesco Lamon; Jonathan Milan; Manlio Moro	3:47.667		
2nd place, silver medalist(s)	Great Britain; Daniel Bigham; Charlie Tanfield; Ethan Vernon; Oliver Wood	3:48.800	+1.133	
Bronze medal final
3rd place, bronze medalist(s)	France; Thomas Denis; Corentin Ermenault; Quentin Lafargue; Benjamin Thomas	3:49.837		
4	Denmark; Carl-Frederik Bévort; Niklas Larsen; Rasmus Pedersen; Theodor Storm	3:50.007	+0.170	
