= 2021 UCI Track Cycling World Championships – Men's team pursuit =

Men's team pursuit at the 2021 UCI Track Cycling World Championships
- Venue: Vélodrome Couvert Régional Jean Stablinski
- Location: Roubaix, France
- Dates: 20–21 October
- Competitors: 53 from 12 nations
- Teams: 12
- Winning time: 3:47.192

Medalists
gold medal	Liam Bertazzo; Simone Consonni; Filippo Ganna; Jonathan Milan; Francesco Lamon	Italy
silver medal	Thomas Boudat; Thomas Denis; Valentin Tabellion; Benjamin Thomas	France
bronze medal	Ethan Hayter; Ethan Vernon; Charlie Tanfield; Oliver Wood; Kian Emadi	Great Britain

The Men's team pursuit competition at the 2021 UCI Track Cycling World Championships was held on 20 and 21 October 2021.

== Results ==
=== Qualifying ===
The qualifying was started on 20 October at 14:01. The eight fastest teams advanced to the first round.

Rank	Nation	Time	Behind	Notes
1	Italy; Simone Consonni; Filippo Ganna; Francesco Lamon; Jonathan Milan	3:49.008		Q
2	France; Thomas Boudat; Thomas Denis; Valentin Tabellion; Benjamin Thomas	3:51.128	+2.120	Q
3	Denmark; Tobias Hansen; Carl-Frederik Bévort; Rasmus Pedersen; Robin Juel Skivild	3:52.873	+3.865	Q
4	Great Britain; Ethan Hayter; Ethan Vernon; Kian Emadi; Oliver Wood	3:53.722	+4.714	Q
5	Switzerland; Simon Vitzthum; Claudio Imhof; Valère Thiébaud; Alex Vogel	3:54.176	+5.168	q
6	Russian Cycling Federation; Gleb Syritsa; Lev Gonov; Egor Igoshev; Ivan Novolodskii	3:54.521	+5.513	q
7	Poland; Alan Banaszek; Bartosz Rudyk; Szymon Sajnok; Daniel Staniszewski	3:56.449	+7.441	q
8	Germany; Tobias Buck-Gramcko; Nicolas Heinrich; Pierre-Pascal Keup; Theo Reinhardt	3:57.123	+8.115	q
9	Canada; Derek Gee; Michael Foley; Jackson Kinniburgh; Ethan Ogrodniczuk	3:59.651	+10.643	
10	Belgium; Tuur Dens; Gianluca Pollefliet; Brent Van Mulders; Noah Vandenbranden	4:02.468	+13.460	
11	Ukraine; Volodymyr Dzhus; Vitaliy Hryniv; Kyrylo Tsarenko; Maksym Vasilyev	4:03.983	+14.975	
12	Kazakhstan; Ramis Dinmukhametov; Dmitriy Potapenko; Artyom Zakharov; Alisher Zhumakan	4:06.798	+17.790	

=== First round ===
First round heats were held as follows:
Heat 1: 6th v 7th fastest
Heat 2: 5th v 8th fastest
Heat 3: 2nd v 3rd fastest
Heat 4: 1st v 4th fastest

The first round was started at 20:25. The winners of heats three and four advanced to the gold medal race. The remaining six teams were ranked on time, from which the top two proceeded to the bronze medal race.

Heat	Rank	Nation	Time	Behind	Notes
1	1	Russian Cycling Federation; Gleb Syritsa; Lev Gonov; Egor Igoshev; Ivan Novolodskii	3:54.030		
1	2	Poland; Alan Banaszek; Szymon Krawczyk; Bartosz Rudyk; Szymon Sajnok	3:55.875	+1.845	
2	1	Switzerland; Claudio Imhof; Lukas Rüegg; Valère Thiébaud; Alex Vogel	3:52.569		
2	2	Germany; Tobias Buck-Gramcko; Nicolas Heinrich; Pierre-Pascal Keup; Theo Reinhardt	3:54.145	+1.576	
3	1	France; Thomas Boudat; Thomas Denis; Valentin Tabellion; Benjamin Thomas	3:47.816		QG
3	2	Denmark; Matias Malmberg; Tobias Hansen; Carl-Frederik Bévort; Rasmus Pedersen	3:52.275	+4.459	QB
4	1	Italy; Liam Bertazzo; Simone Consonni; Filippo Ganna; Jonathan Milan	3:46.760		QG
4	2	Great Britain; Ethan Hayter; Ethan Vernon; Charlie Tanfield; Oliver Wood	3:51.577	+4.817	QB

- QG = qualified for gold medal final
- QB = qualified for bronze medal final

=== Finals ===
The finals were started at 19:16.

Rank	Nation	Time	Behind	Notes
Gold medal race
1st place, gold medalist(s)	Italy; Liam Bertazzo; Simone Consonni; Filippo Ganna; Jonathan Milan	3:47.192		
2nd place, silver medalist(s)	France; Thomas Boudat; Thomas Denis; Valentin Tabellion; Benjamin Thomas	3:49.168	+1.976	
Bronze medal race
3rd place, bronze medalist(s)	Great Britain; Ethan Hayter; Ethan Vernon; Charlie Tanfield; Oliver Wood	3:51.205		
4	Denmark; Matias Malmberg; Tobias Hansen; Carl-Frederik Bévort; Rasmus Pedersen	3:53.182	+1.977	
