= 2023 UCI Track Cycling World Championships – Men's team pursuit =

Men's team pursuit at the 2023 UCI Track Cycling World Championships
- Venue: Sir Chris Hoy Velodrome
- Location: Glasgow, United Kingdom
- Dates: 3–5 August
- Competitors: 61 from 14 nations
- Teams: 14
- Winning time: 3:45.161

Medalists
gold medal	Niklas Larsen; Carl-Frederik Bévort; Lasse Norman Leth; Rasmus Pedersen; Frederik Rodenberg	Denmark
silver medal	Filippo Ganna; Francesco Lamon; Jonathan Milan; Manlio Moro; Simone Consonni	Italy
bronze medal	Aaron Gate; Campbell Stewart; Thomas Sexton; Nick Kergozou	New Zealand

The Men's team pursuit competition at the 2023 UCI Track Cycling World Championships was held from 3 to 5 August 2023.

== Results ==
=== Qualifying ===
The qualifying was started on 3 August at 09:30. The eight fastest teams advanced to the first round.

Rank	Nation	Time	Behind	Notes
1	Denmark; Niklas Larsen; Carl-Frederik Bévort; Lasse Norman Leth; Frederik Rodenberg	3:46.816		Q
2	New Zealand; Aaron Gate; Campbell Stewart; Thomas Sexton; Nick Kergozou	3:49.113	+2.297	Q
3	Italy; Simone Consonni; Filippo Ganna; Francesco Lamon; Jonathan Milan	3:50.408	+3.592	Q
4	Australia; Kelland O'Brien; Josh Duffy; Conor Leahy; Sam Welsford	3:50.488	+3.672	Q
5	France; Benjamin Thomas; Thomas Denis; Corentin Ermenault; Valentin Tabellion	3:50.913	+4.097	Q
6	Canada; Dylan Bibic; Mathias Guillemette; Michael Foley; Derek Gee	3:51.180	+4.364	Q
7	Germany; Theo Reinhardt; Benjamin Boos; Tobias Buck-Gramcko; Felix Groß	3:52.896	+6.080	Q
8	Japan; Eiya Hashimoto; Kazushige Kuboki; Naoki Kojima; Shoi Matsuda	3:53.244	+6.428	Q
9	Belgium; Gianluca Pollefliet; Thibaut Bernard; Tuur Dens; Noah Vandenbranden	3:53.578	+6.762	
10	China; Sun Haijiao; Sun Wentao; Yang Yang; Zhang Haiao	3:55.976	+9.160	
11	Switzerland; Valère Thiébaud; Simon Vitzthum; Claudio Imhof; Alex Vogel	3:57.103	+10.287	
12	United States; Gavin Hoover; Colby Lange; Anders Johnson; Grant Koontz	3:59.295	+12.479	
13	Spain; Francesc Bennassar; Joan Martí Bennassar; Beñat Garaiar; Álvaro Navas	4:03.379	+16.563	
–	Great Britain; Oliver Wood; Ethan Vernon; Daniel Bigham; Charlie Tanfield	Did not finish		

=== First round ===
The first round was held on 4 August at 18:42.

First round heats were held as follows:
Heat 1: 6th v 7th fastest
Heat 2: 5th v 8th fastest
Heat 3: 2nd v 3rd fastest
Heat 4: 1st v 4th fastest

The winners of heats three and four advanced to the gold medal race. The remaining six teams were ranked on time, from which the top two proceeded to the bronze medal race.

Heat	Rank	Nation	Time	Behind	Notes
1	1	Canada; Mathias Guillemette; Michael Foley; Derek Gee; Carson Mattern	3:50.079		
1	2	Germany; Theo Reinhardt; Tobias Buck-Gramcko; Joachim Eilers; Felix Groß	3:51.282	+1.203	
2	1	France; Benjamin Thomas; Thomas Denis; Corentin Ermenault; Valentin Tabellion	3:49.294		
2	2	Japan; Eiya Hashimoto; Kazushige Kuboki; Naoki Kojima; Shoi Matsuda	3:51.650	+2.356	
3	1	Italy; Filippo Ganna; Francesco Lamon; Jonathan Milan; Manlio Moro	3:46.855		QG
3	2	New Zealand; Aaron Gate; Campbell Stewart; Thomas Sexton; Nick Kergozou	3:48.218	+1.363	QB
4	1	Denmark; Niklas Larsen; Carl-Frederik Bévort; Lasse Norman Leth; Rasmus Pedersen	3:45.634		QG
4	2	Australia; Oliver Bleddyn; Kelland O'Brien; Conor Leahy; Sam Welsford	3:48.230	+2.596	QB

- QG = qualified for gold medal final
- QB = qualified for bronze medal final

=== Finals ===
The finals were held on 5 August at 19:07.

Rank	Nation	Time	Behind	Notes
Gold medal race
1st place, gold medalist(s)	Denmark; Niklas Larsen; Carl-Frederik Bévort; Lasse Norman Leth; Rasmus Pedersen	3:45.161		
2nd place, silver medalist(s)	Italy; Filippo Ganna; Francesco Lamon; Jonathan Milan; Manlio Moro	3:47.396	+2.235	
Bronze medal race
3rd place, bronze medalist(s)	New Zealand; Aaron Gate; Campbell Stewart; Thomas Sexton; Nick Kergozou			
4	Australia; Oliver Bleddyn; Kelland O'Brien; Josh Duffy; Sam Welsford		OVL	
