= 2022 UEC European Track Championships – Men's team pursuit =

Men's team pursuit at the 2022 UEC European Track Championships
- Venue: Messe München, Munich
- Date: 11–12 August
- Competitors: 38 from 9 nations
- Winning time: 3:50.507

Medalists
gold medal	Thomas Denis; Quentin Lafargue; Valentin Tabellion; Benjamin Thomas; Thomas Boudat	France
silver medal	Carl-Frederik Bévort; Tobias Hansen; Rasmus Pedersen; Robin Juel Skivild	Denmark
bronze medal	Rhys Britton; Kian Emadi; Charlie Tanfield; Oliver Wood; William Tidball	Great Britain

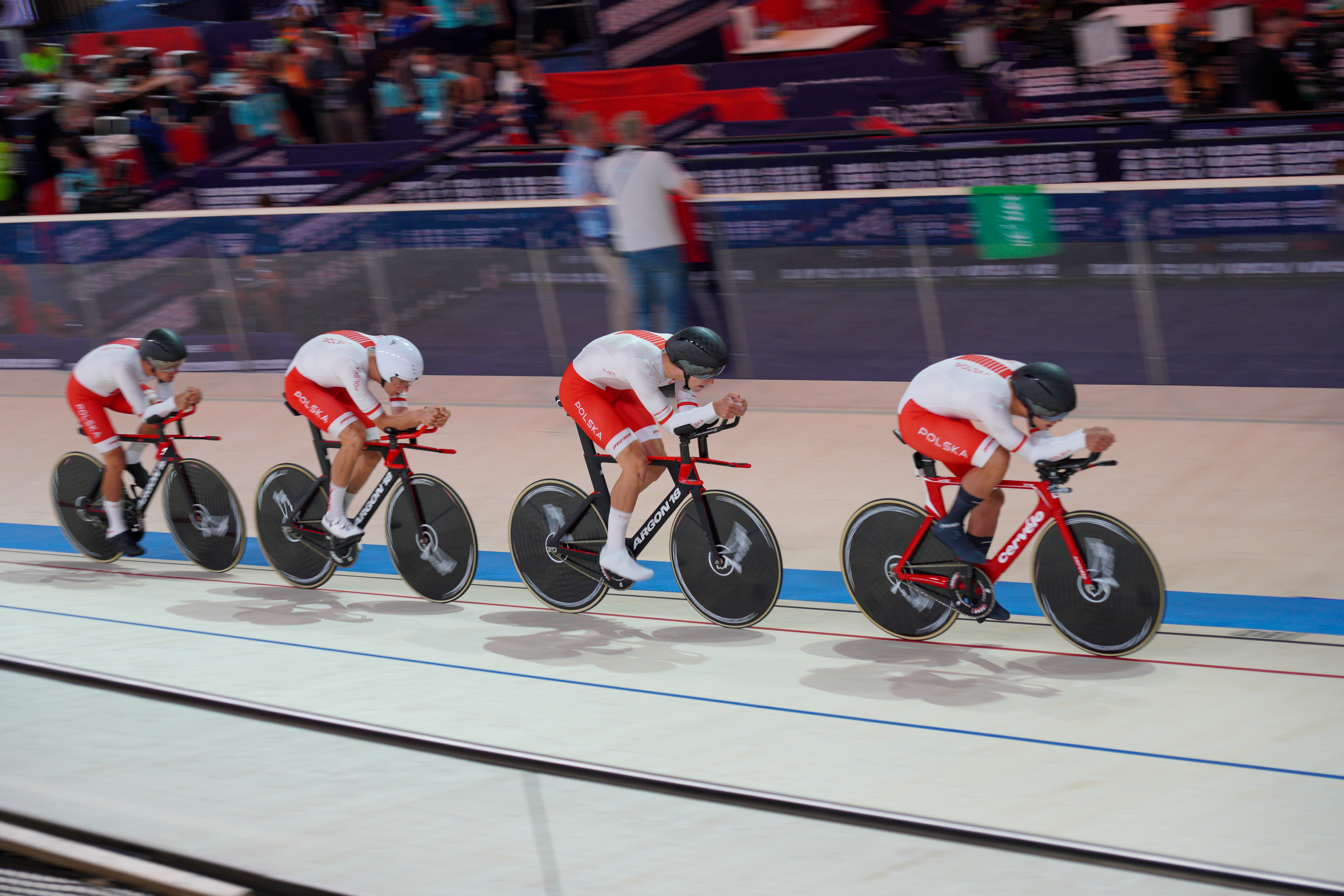
UEC Track Elite European Championships

The men's team pursuit competition at the 2022 UEC European Track Championships was held on 11 and 12 August 2022.

== Results ==
=== Qualifying ===
The eight fastest teams advanced to the first round.

Rank	Nation	Time	Behind	Notes
1	France; Thomas Denis; Quentin Lafargue; Valentin Tabellion; Benjamin Thomas	3:54.125		Q
2	Denmark; Carl-Frederik Bévort; Tobias Hansen; Rasmus Pedersen; Robin Juel Skivild	3:54.280	+0.155	Q
3	Italy; Liam Bertazzo; Francesco Lamon; Stefano Moro; Davide Plebani	3:55.920	+1.795	Q
4	Great Britain; Rhys Britton; Kian Emadi; Charlie Tanfield; Oliver Wood	3:55.998	+1.873	Q
5	Germany; Tobias Buck-Gramcko; Nicolas Heinrich; Theo Reinhardt; Leon Rohde	3:56.239	+2.114	q
6	Switzerland; Claudio Imhof; Valère Thiébaud; Simon Vitzthum; Alex Vogel	3:58.210	+4.085	q
7	Poland; Alan Banaszek; Kacper Majewski; Bartosz Rudyk; Daniel Staniszewski	4:02.702	+8.577	q
8	Belgium; Thibaut Bernard; Maxwell De Broeder; Arthur Senrame; Brent Van Mulders	4:03.021	+8.896	q
9	Spain; Erik Martorell; Sebastián Mora; Jaime Romero; Albert Torres	4:03.340	+9.215	

=== First round ===
First round heats were held as follows:
Heat 1: 6th v 7th fastest
Heat 2: 5th v 8th fastest
Heat 3: 2nd v 3rd fastest
Heat 4: 1st v 4th fastest

The winners of heats 3 and 4 proceeded to the gold medal race. The remaining six teams were ranked on time, from which the top two proceeded to the bronze medal race.

Heat	Rank	Nation	Time	Notes
1	1	Switzerland; Claudio Imhof; Valère Thiébaud; Simon Vitzthum; Alex Vogel	3:56.677	
1	2	Poland; Alan Banaszek; Kacper Majewski; Bartosz Rudyk; Daniel Staniszewski	4:01.497	
2	1	Germany; Tobias Buck-Gramcko; Nicolas Heinrich; Theo Reinhardt; Leon Rohde	3:53.197	QB
2	2	Belgium; Thibaut Bernard; Maxwell De Broeder; Arthur Senrame; Brent Van Mulders	4:00.674	
3	1	Denmark; Carl-Frederik Bévort; Tobias Hansen; Rasmus Pedersen; Robin Juel Skivild	3:54.280	QG
3	2	Italy; Liam Bertazzo; Francesco Lamon; Stefano Moro; Davide Plebani	DNF	
4	1	France; Thomas Boudat; Quentin Lafargue; Valentin Tabellion; Benjamin Thomas	3:52.110	QG
4	2	Great Britain; Rhys Britton; Charlie Tanfield; William Tidball; Oliver Wood	3:55.413	QB

=== Finals ===
Rank	Nation	Time	Behind	Notes
Gold medal final
1st place, gold medalist(s)	France; Thomas Denis; Quentin Lafargue; Valentin Tabellion; Benjamin Thomas	3:50.507		
2nd place, silver medalist(s)	Denmark; Carl-Frederik Bévort; Tobias Hansen; Rasmus Pedersen; Robin Juel Skivild	3:51.692	+1.185	
Bronze medal final
3rd place, bronze medalist(s)	Great Britain; Rhys Britton; Kian Emadi; Charlie Tanfield; Oliver Wood	3:54.373		
4	Germany; Tobias Buck-Gramcko; Nicolas Heinrich; Theo Reinhardt; Leon Rohde	3:55.841	+1.468	
