= 2022 UEC European Track Championships – Men's individual pursuit =

Men's individual pursuit at the 2022 UEC European Track Championships
- Venue: Messe München, Munich
- Date: 13 August
- Competitors: 20 from 14 nations
- Winning time: 4:09.320

Medalists
gold medal	Nicolas Heinrich	Germany
silver medal	Davide Plebani	Italy
bronze medal	Manlio Moro	Italy

The men's individual pursuit competition at the 2022 UEC European Track Championships was held on 13 August 2022.

== Results ==
=== Qualifying ===
The first two racers raced for gold, the third and fourth fastest rider raced for the bronze medal.

Rank	Name	Nation	Time	Behind	Notes
1	Nicolas Heinrich	Germany	4:08.995		QG
2	Davide Plebani	Italy	4:12.412	+3.417	QG
3	Charlie Tanfield	Great Britain	4:12.600	+3.605	QB
4	Manlio Moro	Italy	4:13.166	+4.171	QB
5	Brian Megens	Netherlands	4:15.460	+6.465	
6	Valère Thiébaud	Switzerland	4:15.579	+6.584	
7	Claudio Imhof	Switzerland	4:15.692	+6.697	
8	Tobias Buck-Gramcko	Germany	4:16.778	+7.783	
9	Kacper Majewski	Poland	4:18.864	+9.869	
10	Thibaut Bernard	Belgium	4:19.761	+10.766	
11	Robin Juel Skivild	Denmark	4:21.803	+12.808	
12	Erik Martorell	Spain	4:22.020	+13.025	
13	Valentin Tabellion	France	4:22.389	+13.394	
14	Daniel Dias	Portugal	4:22.428	+13.433	
15	Daniel Crista	Romania	4:22.633	+12.638	
16	Jaime Romero	Spain	4:26.499	+17.504	
17	Thomas Denis	France	4:26.776	+17.781	
18	Brent Van Mulders	Belgium	4:27.012	+18.017	
19	Alon Yogev	Israel	4:33.033	+24.038	
20	Vladislav Logionov	Israel	4:37.148	+28.153	
21	Vitālijs Korņilovs	Latvia	4:43.006	+34.011	

=== Finals ===
Rank	Name	Nation	Time	Behind	Notes
Gold medal final
1st place, gold medalist(s)	Nicolas Heinrich	Germany	4:09.320		
2nd place, silver medalist(s)	Davide Plebani	Italy	4:12.924	+3.604	
Bronze medal final
3rd place, bronze medalist(s)	Manlio Moro	Italy	4:15.362		
4	Charlie Tanfield	Great Britain	4:15.503	+0.141	
