= 2020 UEC European Track Championships (under-23 & junior) =

- Venue: Fiorenzuola d'Arda
- Date(s): 8–13 October
- Velodrome: Velodromo Attilio Pavesi
- Nations participating: 22
- Cyclists participating: 304
- Events: 44

The 2020 UEC European Track Championships (under-23 & junior) were the 20th continental championships for European under-23 and junior track cyclists, and the 11th since the event was renamed following the reorganisation of European track cycling in 2010. The event took place at the Velodromo Attilio Pavesi in Fiorenzuola d'Arda, Italy from 8 to 13 October 2020.

== Medal summary ==
=== Under-23 ===
Event	Gold		Silver		Bronze	
Men's events
Sprint	Martin Čechman; Czech Republic		Mikhail Iakovlev; Russia		Konstantinos Livanos; Greece	
Team sprint	Russia; Daniil Komkov; Dmitry Nesterov; Pavel Rostov	1:12.632	Czech Republic; Matěj Bohuslávek; Martin Čechman; Jakub Šťastný	1:12.748	Germany; Anton Höhne; Julien Jäger; Nik Schröter	1:13.164
1 km time trial	Felix Groß; Germany	1:02.086	Anton Höhne; Germany	1:03.127	Ivan Smirnov; Russia	1:03.441
Keirin	Anton Höhne; Germany		Daan Kool; Netherlands		Mateusz Sztrauch; Poland	
Individual pursuit	Felix Groß; Germany	4:19.716	Ivan Smirnov; Russia	4:24.748	Lev Gonov; Russia	4:19.504
Team pursuit	Russia; Nikita Bersenev; Lev Gonov; Ivan Smirnov; Gleb Syritsa	3:59.276	Italy; Davide Boscaro; Gidas Umbri; Jonathan Milan; Tommaso Nencini; Giulio Masotto	4:08.204	Germany; Richard Banusch; Tobias Buck-Gramcko; Felix Groß; Nicolas Heinrich	4:04.824
Points race	Gleb Syritsa; Russia	66 pts	Iúri Leitão; Portugal	34 pts	Richard Banusch; Germany	34 pts
Scratch	Bartosz Rudyk; Poland		Iúri Leitão; Portugal		Tuur Dens; Belgium	
Madison	Russia; Ivan Smirnov; Lev Gonov	97 pts	Switzerland; Valère Thiébaud; Robin Froidevaux	58 pts	Poland; Bartosz Rudyk; Filip Prokopyszyn	40 pts
Omnium	Gleb Syritsa; Russia	132 pts	Alex Vogel; Switzerland	126 pts	Fabio Van den Bossche; Belgium	122 pts
Elimination race	Jules Hesters; Belgium		Iúri Leitão; Portugal		Raúl García Pierna; Spain	
Women's events
Sprint	Lea Friedrich; Germany		Pauline Grabosch; Germany		Yana Tyshenko; Russia	
Team sprint	Germany; Lea Friedrich; Pauline Grabosch; Alessa Pröpster	1:20.726	Russia; Ksenia Andreeva; Serafima Grishina; Yana Tyshenko	1:20.866	Poland; Paulina Petri; Nikola Seremak; Nikola Sibiak	1:21.026
500 m time trial	Lea Friedrich; Germany	39.618	Pauline Grabosch; Germany	40.715	Yana Tyshenko; Russia	40.855
Keirin	Lea Friedrich; Germany		Nikola Sibiak; Poland		Nikola Seremak; Poland	
Individual pursuit	Franziska Brauße; Germany	3:35.040	Vittoria Guazzini; Italy	3:43.279	Mia Griffin; Ireland	3:41.810
Team pursuit	Italy; Marta Cavalli; Chiara Consonni; Martina Fidanza; Vittoria Guazzini	4:36.080	Germany; Franziska Brauße; Lena Charlotte Reißner; Finja Smekal; Lea Lin Teutenberg	4:38.400	Poland; Karolina Kumięga; Karolina Lipiejko; Wiktoria Pikulik; Anna Sagan; Patrycja Lorkowska	OVL
Points race	Silvia Zanardi; Italy	61 pts	Shari Bossuyt; Belgium	40 pts	Franziska Brauße; Germany	33 pts
Scratch	Martina Fidanza; Italy		Maike van der Duin; Netherlands		Maria Martins; Portugal	
Madison	Italy; Chiara Consonni; Martina Fidanza	44 pts	Germany; Lea Lin Teutenberg; Franziska Brauße	26 pts	Poland; Wiktoria Pikulik; Patrycja Lorkowska	22 pts
Omnium	Maria Novolodskaya; Russia	167 pts	Wiktoria Pikulik; Poland	128 pts	Olivija Baleišytė; Lithuania	109 pts
Elimination race	Chiara Consonni; Italy		Maria Martins; Portugal		Mylène de Zoete; Netherlands	

=== Junior ===
Event	Gold		Silver		Bronze	
Men's events
Sprint	Willy Leonhard Weinrich; Germany		Konrad Burawski; Poland		Domenic Kruse; Germany	
Team sprint	Germany; Paul Schippert; Domenic Kruse; Willy Leonhard Weinrich; Paul Groß	1:14.940	Poland; Adam Janeczek; Maciej Fąk; Tomasz Grzesiak; Konrad Burawski	1:15.339	Russia; Nikita Kalachnik; Alexander Popov; Alexey Sherstenikin	1:14.950
1 km time trial	Noah Vandenbranden; Belgium	1:03.201	Laurin Drescher; Germany	1:04.022	Willy Leonhard Weinrich; Germany	1:04.606
Keirin	Bohdan Danylchuk; Ukraine		Paul Groß; Germany		Damien Fortis; Switzerland	
Individual pursuit	Benjamin Boos; Germany	3:21.625	Carl-Frederik Bevort; Denmark	3:24.156	Manlio Moro; Italy	3:21.487
Team pursuit	Russia; Dmitrii Dolzhikov; Mark Kryuchkov; David Shekelashvili; Daniil Valgonen	4:17.796	Germany; Benjamin Boos; Maximilian Eißer; Moritz Kretschy; Luis-Joe Lührs	4:19.278	Italy; Lorenzo Balestra; Niccolò Galli; Manlio Moro; Andrea D'Amato; Luca Portigliatti	4:16.188
Points race	Moritz Kretschy; Germany	31 pts	Fabio Christen; Switzerland	28 pts	Tobias Aagaard Hansen; Denmark	20 pts
Scratch	Loe van Belle; Netherlands		Noah Vandenbranden; Belgium		Laurin Drescher; Germany	
Madison	Denmark; Tobias Lund Andresen; Kasper Andersen	37 pts	Spain; Marc Terrasa; Francesc Bennàssar	25 pts	Germany; Tim Torn Teutenberg; Benjamin Boos	25 pts
Omnium	Loe van Belle; Netherlands	124 pts	Tim Torn Teutenberg; Germany	116 pts	Eddy Le Huitouze; France	114 pts
Elimination race	Tobias Aagaard Hansen; Denmark		Adam Wozniak; Poland		Fabian Weiss; Switzerland	
Women's events
Sprint	Alina Lysenko; Russia		Marie-Divine Kouamé Taky; France		Elizaveta Bogomolova; Russia	
Team sprint	Poland; Joanna Błaszczak; Natalia Nieruchalska; Nikola Wielowska	1:22.218	Italy; Valentina Basilico; Sara Fiorin; Gaia Tormena	1:24.381	Russia; Varvara Blagodarova; Elizaveta Bogomolova; Elizaveta Krechkina	1:24.273
500 m time trial	Marith Vanhove; Belgium	42.307	Alla Biletska; Ukraine	42.658	Marie-Divine Kouamé Taky; France	42.723
Keirin	Alina Lysenko; Russia		Marie-Divine Kouamé Taky; France		Alla Biletska; Ukraine	
Individual pursuit	Alena Ivanchenko; Russia	2:26.080	Zuzanna Olejniczak; Poland	2:30.986	Julie De Wilde; Belgium	2:28.806
Team pursuit	Russia; Inna Abaidullina; Alena Ivanchenko; Anastasia Pecherskikh; Valeria Valgonen	4:41.581	Italy; Lara Crestanello; Silvia Bortolotti; Eleonora Gasparrini; Elisa Tonelli; Carlotta Cipressi	4:47.780	Germany; Hanna Dopjans; Lana Eberle; Fabienne Jahrig; Marla Sigmund; Paula Leonhardt	4:48.821
Points race	Katrijn De Clercq; Belgium	26 pts	Daniela Campos; Portugal	23 pts	Daniek Hengeveld; Netherlands	21 pts
Scratch	Nora Jenčušová; Slovakia		Nikola Wielowska; Poland		Lara Crestanello; Italy	
Madison	Belgium; Marith Vanhove; Katrijn De Clercq	31 pts	Poland; Nikola Wielowska; Zuzanna Olejniczak	23 pts	Italy; Lara Crestanello; Valentina Basilico	23 pts
Omnium	Nikola Wielowska; Poland	133 pts	Flavie Boulais; France	114 pts	Daniela Campos; Portugal	114 pts
Elimination race	Daniela Campos; Portugal		Gabriela Bártová; Czech Republic		Daniek Hengeveld; Netherlands	

=== Notes ===
- Competitors named in italics only participated in rounds prior to the final.

== Medal table ==
* Host nation (Italy)

Rank	Nation	Gold	Silver	Bronze	Total
1	Germany	12	9	9	30
2	Russia	11	3	7	21
3	Italy*	5	4	4	13
4	Belgium	5	2	3	10
5	Poland	3	8	6	17
6	Netherlands	2	2	3	7
7	Denmark	2	1	1	4
8	Portugal	1	5	2	8
9	Czech Republic	1	2	0	3
10	Ukraine	1	1	1	3
11	Slovakia	1	0	0	1
12	France	0	3	2	5
12	Switzerland	0	3	2	5
14	Spain	0	1	1	2
15	Greece	0	0	1	1
15	Ireland	0	0	1	1
15	Lithuania	0	0	1	1
Totals (17 entries)		44	44	44	132
