= 2026 UCI Track Cycling World Championships – Men's madison =

Men's madison at the 2026 UCI Track Cycling World Championships
- Venue: Shanghai Velodrome
- Location: Shanghai, China
- Dates: 18 October
- Competitors: 36 from 18 nations
- Teams: 18
- Winning points: 88

Medalists
gold medal	Carl-Frederik Bévort; Lasse Norman Leth	Denmark
silver medal	Iúri Leitão; Ivo Oliveira	Portugal
bronze medal	Moritz Augenstein; Roger Kluge	Germany

The Men's madison competition at the 2026 UCI Track Cycling World Championships was held on 18 October 2026.

== Results ==
The race was started at 16:03.

Rank	Name	Nation	Lap points	Sprint points	Finish order	Total points
1st place, gold medalist(s)	Carl-Frederik Bévort; Lasse Norman Leth	Denmark	60	28	5	88
2nd place, silver medalist(s)	Iúri Leitão; Ivo Oliveira	Portugal	20	47	1	67
3rd place, bronze medalist(s)	Moritz Augenstein; Roger Kluge	Germany	20	32	3	52
4	Lindsay De Vylder; Fabio Van Den Bossche	Belgium	20	31	2	51
5	Simone Consonni; Niccolò Galli	Italy	20	20	7	40
6	Matthew Bostock; Mark Stewart	Great Britain	20	12	4	32
7	Keegan Hornblow; George Jackson	New Zealand	20	12	8	32
8	Yoeri Havik; Philip Heijnen	Netherlands	20	12	10	32
9	Heimo Fugger; Maximilian Schmidbauer	Austria	20	8	6	28
10	Bryan Coquard; Benjamin Thomas	France	0	13	15	13
11	Sebastián Mora; Álvaro Navas	Spain	0	7	9	7
12	Graeme Frislie; Peter Moore	United States	0	5	14	5
13	Shunsuke Imamura; Kazushige Kuboki	Japan	−20	2	13	−18
14	Noah Bögli; Noah Schnyder	Switzerland	−20	0	11	−20
15	Blake Agnoletto; Conor Leahy	Australia	−20	0	12	−20
16	Alan Banaszek; Daniel Staniszewski	Poland	−20	0	16	−20
17	Milan Kadlec; Matyáš Koblížek	Czechia	−40	2	–	DNF
17	Ilya Karabutov; Dmitriy Noskov	Kazakhstan	−40	0	–	DNF
