= UCI Track Cycling World Championships – Men's elimination =

The UCI Track Cycling World Championships – Men's elimination, colloquially known as the Devil is the men's world championship elimination race event held annually at the UCI Track Cycling World Championships. The event was first introduced in 2021 and is the most recent addition to the program, having proved very popular as the penultimate section of the omnium.

== Medalists ==
| Championship | Winner | Runner-up | Third |
|---|---|---|---|
| 2021 Roubaix | Elia Viviani (ITA) | Iúri Leitão (POR) | Sergey Rostovtsev |
| 2022 Saint-Quentin-en-Yvelines | Elia Viviani (ITA) | Corbin Strong (NZL) | Ethan Vernon (GBR) |
| 2023 Glasgow | Ethan Vernon (GBR) | Dylan Bibic (CAN) | Elia Viviani (ITA) |
| 2024 Ballerup | Tobias Hansen (DEN) | Elia Viviani (ITA) | Dylan Bibic (CAN) |
| 2025 Santiago | Elia Viviani (ITA) | Campbell Stewart (NZL) | Yoeri Havik (NED) |
| 2026 Shanghai | Tim Torn Teutenberg (GER) | Tobias Hansen (DEN) | Jules Hesters (BEL) |

== Medal table ==
| Rank | Nation | Gold | Silver | Bronze | Total |
|---|---|---|---|---|---|
| 1 | Italy | 3 | 1 | 1 | 5 |
| 2 | Denmark | 1 | 1 | 0 | 2 |
| 3 | Great Britain | 1 | 0 | 1 | 2 |
| 4 | Germany | 1 | 0 | 0 | 1 |
| 5 | New Zealand | 0 | 2 | 0 | 2 |
| 6 | Canada | 0 | 1 | 1 | 2 |
| 7 | Portugal | 0 | 1 | 0 | 1 |
| 8 | Belgium | 0 | 0 | 1 | 1 |
| 8 | Netherlands | 0 | 0 | 1 | 1 |
| 8 | RCF | 0 | 0 | 1 | 1 |
| Totals (10 entries) | | 6 | 6 | 6 | 18 |
