= 2022 UEC European Track Championships =

Track cycling event

- Venue: Munich, Germany
- Date: 11–16 August
- Velodrome: Messe München
- Events: 22 (11 women, 11 men)

The 2022 UEC European Track Championships were the thirteenth edition of the elite UEC European Track Championships in track cycling and took place at Messe München in Munich, Germany, from 11 to August 2022, as part of the 2022 European Championships. This was the second edition of this event, after 2018, which takes place as part of the wider European Championships multi-sport event.

== Schedule ==
Competition	F	Final

Men
Date →	Thu 11	Fri 12		Sat 13		Sun 14		Mon 15		Tue 16	
Event ↓	E	A	E	A	E	A	E	A	E	A	E
Sprint				Q, ^{1}/_{16}	^{1}/_{8}, QF		SF, F				
Team sprint	Q	R1	F								
Team pursuit	Q	R1	F								
Keirin										R1, R	R2, F
Omnium								Q, SR	TR, ER, PR		
Madison										Q	F
1 km time trial								Q	F		
Pursuit				Q	F						
Points race		Q	F								
Scratch				Q	F						
Elimination race						Q	F				

Women
Date →	Thu 11	Fri 12		Sat 13		Sun 14		Mon 15		Tue 16	
Event ↓	E	A	E	A	E	A	E	A	E	A	E
Sprint						Q, ^{1}/_{16}	^{1}/_{8}, QF		SF, F		
Team sprint	Q	R1	F								
Team pursuit	Q	R1	F								
Keirin										R1, R	R2, F
Omnium								Q, SR	TR, ER, PR		
Madison										Q	F
500 m time trial				Q	F						
Pursuit				Q	F						
Points race						Q	F				
Scratch		Q	F								
Elimination race				Q	F						

A = Afternoon session, E = Evening session
Q = qualifiers, R1 = first round, R2 = second round, R = repechages, ^{1}/_{16} = sixteenth finals, ^{1}/_{8} = eighth finals, QF = quarterfinals, SF = semifinals,
SR = Scratch Race, TR = Tempo Race, ER = Elimination Race, PR = Points Race

== Events ==
Event	Gold		Silver		Bronze	
Men's events
Sprint	Sebastien Vigier; France		Jack Carlin; Great Britain		Rayan Helal; France	
Team sprint	Netherlands; Jeffrey Hoogland; Harrie Lavreysen; Roy van den Berg	34.639	France; Timmy Gillion; Rayan Helal; Sébastien Vigier; Melvin Landerneau	35.516	Great Britain; Jack Carlin; Alistair Fielding; Hamish Turnbull	35.173
Team pursuit	France; Thomas Denis; Quentin Lafargue; Valentin Tabellion; Benjamin Thomas; Thomas Boudat	3:50.507	Denmark; Carl-Frederik Bévort; Tobias Hansen; Rasmus Pedersen; Robin Juel Skivild	3:51.692	Great Britain; Rhys Britton; Kian Emadi; Charlie Tanfield; Oliver Wood; William Tidball	3:54.373
Keirin	Sébastien Vigier; France		Maximilian Dörnbach; Germany		Melvin Landerneau; France	
Omnium	Donavan Grondin; France	150 pts	Simone Consonni; Italy	148 pts	Sebastian Mora; Spain	146 pts
Madison	Germany; Roger Kluge; Theo Reinhardt	101 pts	France; Thomas Boudat; Donavan Grondin	91 pts	Belgium; Robbe Ghys; Fabio Van den Bossche	58 pts
1 km time trial^{[N]}	Melvin Landerneau; France	59.975	Matteo Bianchi; Italy	1:00.089	Maximilian Dörnbach; Germany	1:00.225
Individual pursuit^{[N]}	Nicolas Heinrich; Germany	4:09.320	Davide Plebani; Italy	4:12.924	Manlio Moro; Italy	4:15.362
Points race^{[O]}	Benjamin Thomas; France	135 pts	Robbe Ghys; Belgium	123 pts	Vincent Hoppezak; Netherlands	113 pts
Scratch^{[O]}	Iúri Leitão; Portugal		Moritz Malcharek; Germany		Roy Eefting; Netherlands	
Elimination race^{[O]}	Elia Viviani; Italy		Theo Reinhardt; Germany		Jules Hesters; Belgium	
Women's events
Sprint	Emma Hinze; Germany		Mathilde Gros; France		Laurine van Riessen; Netherlands	
Team sprint	Germany; Lea Friedrich; Pauline Grabosch; Emma Hinze	38.061	Netherlands; Shanne Braspennincx; Kyra Lamberink; Hetty van de Wouw; Steffie van der Peet	38.304	Poland; Marlena Karwacka; Urszula Łoś; Nikola Sibiak	39.164
Team pursuit	Germany; Franziska Brauße; Lisa Brennauer; Lisa Klein; Mieke Kröger	4:10.872	Italy; Rachele Barbieri; Vittoria Guazzini; Letizia Paternoster; Silvia Zanardi; Martina Fidanza	4:11.571	France; Victoire Berteau; Marion Borras; Clara Copponi; Valentine Fortin	caught opponent
Keirin	Lea Friedrich; Germany		Urszula Łoś; Poland		Olena Starikova; Ukraine	
Omnium	Rachele Barbieri; Italy	174 pts	Clara Copponi; France	171 pts	Daria Pikulik; Poland	167 pts
Madison	Italy; Silvia Zanardi; Rachele Barbieri	41 pts	France; Clara Copponi; Marion Borras	40 pts	Denmark; Amalie Dideriksen; Julie Leth	38 pts
500 m time trial^{[N]}	Emma Hinze; Germany	32.668	Olena Starikova; Ukraine	33.403	Miriam Vece; Italy	33.434
Individual pursuit^{[N]}	Mieke Kröger; Germany	3:22.469	Lisa Brennauer; Germany	3:23.566	Vittoria Guazzini; Italy	3:24.813
Points race^{[O]}	Lotte Kopecky; Belgium	85 pts	Silvia Zanardi; Italy	53 pts	Victoire Berteau; France	47 pts
Scratch^{[O]}	Anita Stenberg; Norway		Jessica Roberts; Great Britain		Nikola Wielowska; Poland	
Elimination race^{[O]}	Lotte Kopecky; Belgium		Pfeiffer Georgi; Great Britain		Mylène de Zoete; Netherlands	

- Competitors named in italics only participated in rounds prior to the final.
- ^{^{N}} These events are not contested in the Olympics.
- ^{^{O}} In the Olympics, these events are contested within the omnium only.

== Medal table ==
* Host nation (Germany)

Rank	Nation	Gold	Silver	Bronze	Total
1	Germany*	8	4	1	13
2	France	6	5	4	15
3	Italy	3	5	3	11
4	Belgium	2	1	2	5
5	Netherlands	1	1	4	6
6	Norway	1	0	0	1
6	Portugal	1	0	0	1
8	Great Britain	0	3	2	5
9	Poland	0	1	3	4
10	Denmark	0	1	1	2
10	Ukraine	0	1	1	2
12	Spain	0	0	1	1
Totals (12 entries)		22	22	22	66
