= 2022 UEC European Track Championships – Women's scratch =

European Track Championships

Women's scratch at the 2022 UEC European Track Championships
- Venue: Messe München, Munich
- Date: 12 August
- Competitors: 19 from 19 nations

Medalists
gold medal	Anita Stenberg	Norway
silver medal	Jessica Roberts	Great Britain
bronze medal	Nikola Wielowska	Poland

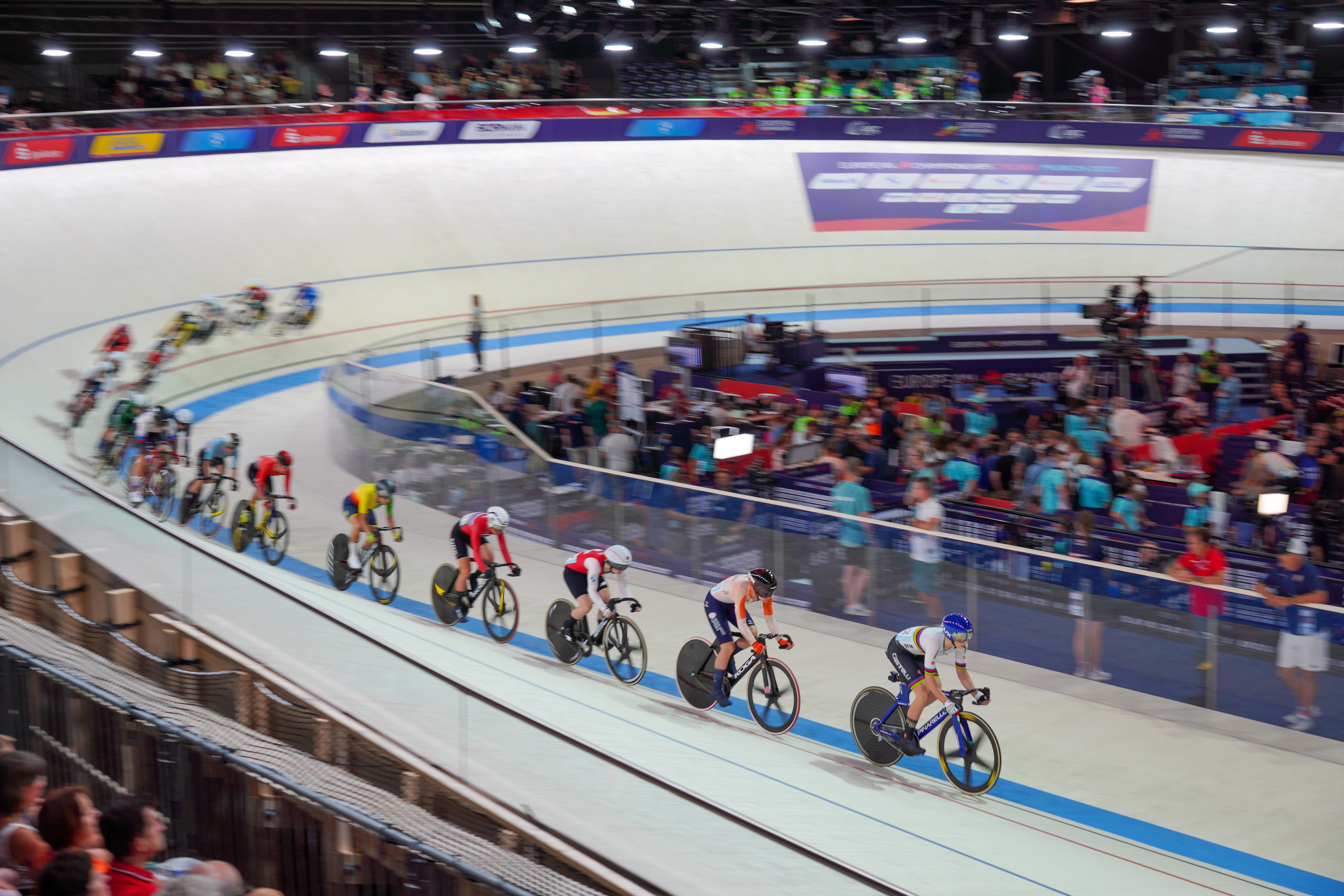
UEC Track Elite European Championships

The women's scratch competition at the 2022 UEC European Track Championships was held on 12 August 2022.

== Results ==
First rider across the line without a net lap loss wins.

Rank	Name	Nation	Laps down
1st place, gold medalist(s)	Anita Stenberg	Norway	
2nd place, silver medalist(s)	Jessica Roberts	Great Britain	
3rd place, bronze medalist(s)	Nikola Wielowska	Poland	
4	Maria Martins	Portugal	
5	Maike van der Duin	Netherlands	
6	Petra Ševčíková	Czech Republic	
7	Aline Seitz	Switzerland	
8	Katrijn De Clercq	Belgium	
9	Emily Kay	Ireland	
10	Argiro Milaki	Greece	
11	Martina Fidanza	Italy	
12	Kathrin Schweinberger	Austria	
13	Tania Calvo	Spain	
14	Kseniia Fedotova	Ukraine	
15	Lea Lin Teutenberg	Germany	
16	Jade Labastugue	France	
17	Olivija Baleišytė	Lithuania	
18	Johanna Kitti Borissza	Hungary	
19	Alžbeta Bačíková	Slovakia	
