= 2019 UCI Junior Track Cycling World Championships =

- Venue: Frankfurt (Oder), Germany
- Date: 14–18 August 2019

The 2019 UCI Junior Track Cycling World Championships were the 45th annual Junior World Championships for track cycling, held in Frankfurt (Oder), Germany from 14 to 18 August.

The Championships had ten events each for men and women (sprint, points race, individual pursuit, team pursuit, time trial, team sprint, keirin, madison, scratch race, omnium).

== Medal summary ==
Event	Gold	Silver	Bronze
Men's Events
Sprint	Konstantinos Livanos; Greece	Esow Alben; India	Daan Kool; Netherlands
Points race	Vlas Shichkin; Russia	Kévin Vauquelin; France	Raúl García Pierna; Spain
Individual pursuit	Tobias Buck-Gramcko; Germany	Nicolas Heinrich; Germany	Tristan Jussaume; Canada
Team pursuit	Tobias Buck-Gramcko; Hannes Wilksch; Pierre-Pascal Keup; Nicolas Heinrich; Moritz Kretschy; Germany	Kévin Vauquelin; Antonin Corvaisier; Clément Petit; Florian Pardon; France	Ivan Novolodskii; Vlas Shichkin; Ilia Schegolkov; Egor Igoshev; Russia
Time trial	Tobias Buck-Gramcko; Germany	Daan Kool; Netherlands	Matteo Bianchi; Italy
Team sprint	Rojit Singh Yanglem; Esow Alben; Ronaldo Singh Laitonjam; Jemsh Singh Keithellakpam; India	John Trovas; Carlos Carisimo; Sam Gallagher; Australia	James Bunting; Matti Egglestone; Rhys Thomas; Great Britain
Keirin	Konstantinos Livanos; Greece	Sam Gallagher; Australia	Esow Alben; India
Madison	Laurence Pithie; Kiaan Watts; New Zealand	Tim Torn Teutenberg; Hannes Wilksch; Germany	Clément Petit; Kévin Vauquelin; France
Scratch race	Benjamin Hertz; Denmark	Anderson Arboleda; Colombia	Jacob Decar; Chile
Omnium	Laurence Pithie; New Zealand	Graeme Frislie; Australia	Park Young-kyun; South Korea

Event	Gold	Silver	Bronze
Women's Events
Sprint	Alessa-Catriona Pröpster; Germany	Nikola Seremak; Poland	Emma Finucane; United Kingdom
Individual pursuit	Ally Wollaston; New Zealand	Elynor Bäckstedt; United Kingdom	Lara Gillespie; Ireland
Time trial	Taky Marie-Divine Kouamé; France	Alessa-Catriona Pröpster; Germany	Emma Finucane; United Kingdom
Points race	Tsuyaka Uchino; Japan	Valeria Golayeva; Russia	Yareli Acevedo; Mexico
Keirin	Alessa-Catriona Pröpster; Germany	Ella Sibley; Australia	Nikola Seremak; Poland
Scratch race	Ella Sibley; Australia	Catalina Soto; Chile	Ella Barnwell; United Kingdom
Team sprint	Fan Bingbing; Luo Jing; Sun Jingye; China	Alessa-Catriona Pröpster; Christina Sperlich; Katharina Albers; Germany	Nikola Seremak; Nikola Wielowska; Poland
Team pursuit	Giorgia Catarzi; Camilla Alessio; Eleonora Gasparrini; Sofia Collinelli; Matilde Vitillo; Italy	Emily Paterson; McKenzie Milne; Ally Wollaston; Samantha Donnelly; New Zealand	Elynor Bäckstedt; Sophie Lewis; Eluned King; Ella Barnwell; Great Britain
Omnium	Megan Jastrab; United States	Eleonora Gasparrini; Italy	Ella Barnwell; United Kingdom
Madison	Zoe Ta-Perez; Megan Jastrab; United States	Sophie Lewis; Elynor Bäckstedt; Great Britain	Valeria Golayeva; Mariia Miliaeva; Russia

== Medal table ==
* Host nation (Germany)

Rank	Nation	Gold	Silver	Bronze	Total
1	Germany (GER)*	5	4	0	9
2	New Zealand (NZL)	3	1	0	4
3	Greece (GRE)	2	0	0	2
3	United States (USA)	2	0	0	2
5	Australia (AUS)	1	4	0	5
6	France (FRA)	1	2	1	4
7	Russia (RUS)	1	1	2	4
8	India (IND)	1	1	1	3
8	Italy (ITA)	1	1	1	3
10	China (CHN)	1	0	0	1
10	Denmark (DEN)	1	0	0	1
10	Japan (JPN)	1	0	0	1
13	Great Britain (GBR)	0	2	6	8
14	Poland (POL)	0	1	2	3
15	Chile (CHI)	0	1	1	2
15	Netherlands (NED)	0	1	1	2
17	Colombia (COL)	0	1	0	1
18	Canada (CAN)	0	0	1	1
18	Ireland (IRL)	0	0	1	1
18	Mexico (MEX)	0	0	1	1
18	South Korea (KOR)	0	0	1	1
18	Spain (ESP)	0	0	1	1
Totals (22 entries)		20	20	20	60
