= UCI Track Cycling World Championships – Women's elimination =

The UCI Track Cycling World Championships – Women's elimination is the women's world championship elimination race event held annually at the UCI Track Cycling World Championships. The event was first introduced in 2021.

== Medalists ==
Championship	Winner	Runner-up	Third
2021 Roubaix	Letizia Paternoster (ITA)	Lotte Kopecky (BEL)	Jennifer Valente (USA)
2022 Saint-Quentin-en-Yvelines	Lotte Kopecky (BEL)	Rachele Barbieri (ITA)	Jennifer Valente (USA)
2023 Glasgow	Lotte Kopecky (BEL)	Valentine Fortin (FRA)	Jennifer Valente (USA)
2024 Ballerup	Ally Wollaston (NZL)	Lotte Kopecky (BEL)	Jennifer Valente (USA)
2025 Santiago	Lara Gillespie (IRL)	Katie Archibald (GBR)	Hélène Hesters (BEL)
2026 Shanghai	Lotte Kopecky (BEL)	Yumi Kajihara (JPN)	Megan Jastrab (USA)

== Medal table ==
Rank	Nation	Gold	Silver	Bronze	Total
1	Belgium	3	2	1	6
2	Italy	1	1	0	2
3	Ireland	1	0	0	1
3	New Zealand	1	0	0	1
5	France	0	1	0	1
5	Great Britain	0	1	0	1
5	Japan	0	1	0	1
8	United States	0	0	5	5
Totals (8 entries)		6	6	6	18
