= Simone Consonni =

Italian cyclist (born 1994)

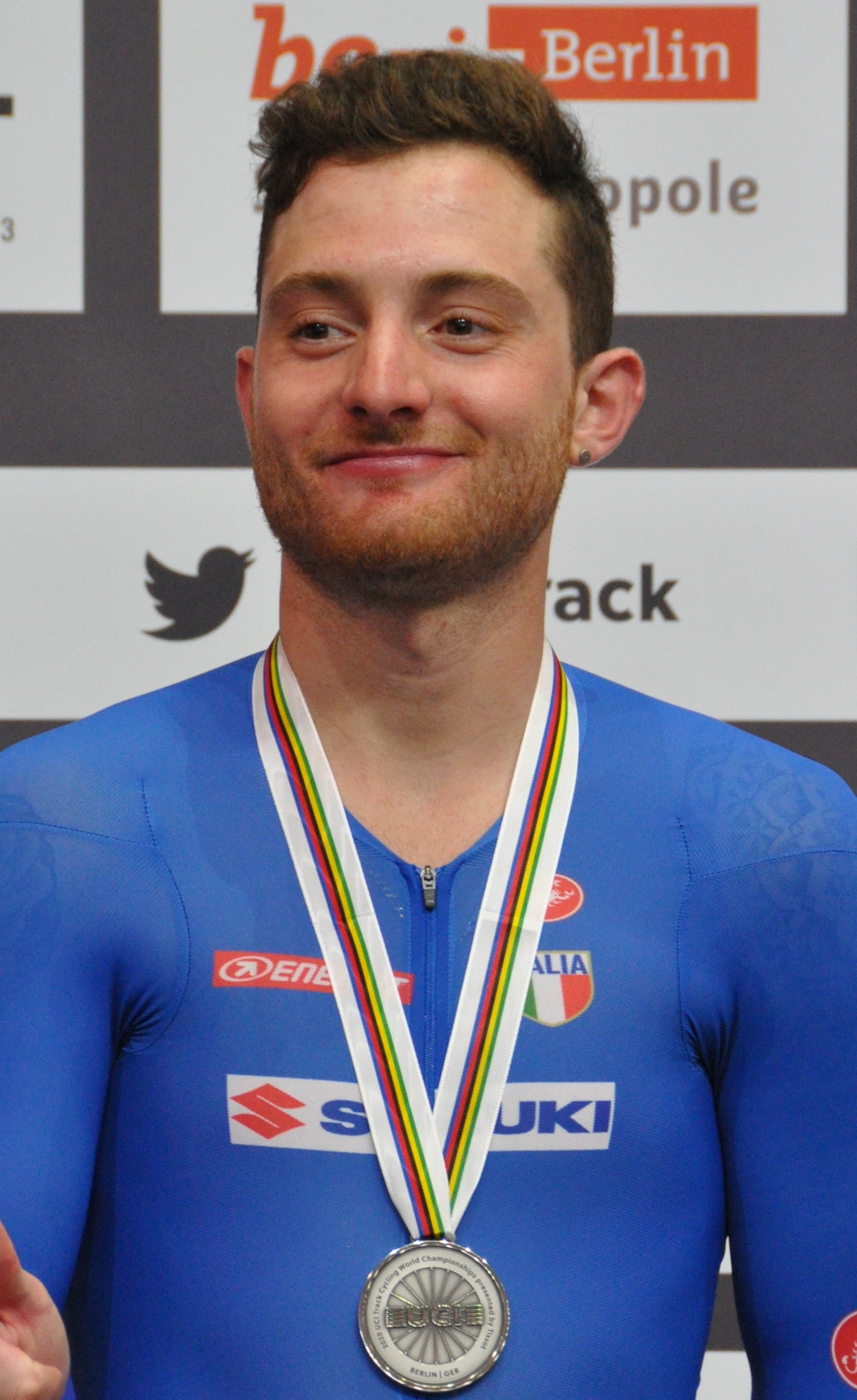
- Consonni at the 2020 UCI Track Cycling World Championships

Personal information
- Born: 12 September 1994 (age 32) Ponte San Pietro, Lombardy, Italy
- Height: 1.76 m (5 ft 9 in)
- Weight: 72 kg (159 lb)

Cycling career
- Sport: Cycling
- Current team: Lidl–Trek
- Disciplines: Road; Track
- Role: Rider

Amateur team
- 2013–2016: Team Colpack

Professional teams
- 2017–2019: UAE Abu Dhabi
- 2020–2023: Cofidis
- 2024–: Lidl–Trek

Major wins
- Track Olympic Games Team pursuit (2020) World Championships Team pursuit (2021)
Medal record
Men's track cycling
Representing Italy
Olympic Games
Gold medal – first place	2020 Tokyo	Team pursuit
Silver medal – second place	2024 Paris	Madison
Bronze medal – third place	2024 Paris	Team pursuit
World Championships
Gold medal – first place	2021 Roubaix	Team pursuit
Silver medal – second place	2020 Berlin	Scratch
Silver medal – second place	2021 Roubaix	Madison
Silver medal – second place	2022 Saint-Quentin-en-Yvelines	Team pursuit
Silver medal – second place	2023 Glasgow	Team pursuit
Silver medal – second place	2024 Ballerup	Omnium
Bronze medal – third place	2017 Hong Kong	Team pursuit
Bronze medal – third place	2018 Apeldoorn	Omnium
Bronze medal – third place	2018 Apeldoorn	Team pursuit
Bronze medal – third place	2020 Berlin	Team pursuit
European Championships
Gold medal – first place	2023 Grenchen	Points race
Gold medal – first place	2023 Grenchen	Team pursuit
Silver medal – second place	2015 Grenchen	Elimination
Silver medal – second place	2016 Yvelines	Team pursuit
Silver medal – second place	2017 Berlin	Team pursuit
Silver medal – second place	2019 Apeldoorn	Team pursuit
Silver medal – second place	2022 Munich	Omnium
Silver medal – second place	2023 Grenchen	Omnium
Silver medal – second place	2023 Grenchen	Madison
Bronze medal – third place	2024 Apeldoorn	Team pursuit
Men's road bicycle racing
World Championships
Silver medal – second place	2015 Richmond	Under-23 road race

Simone Consonni (born 12 September 1994) is an Italian professional racing cyclist, who currently rides for UCI WorldTeam Lidl–Trek. He rode at the 2015 UCI Track Cycling World Championships. In August 2018, he was named in the startlist for the Vuelta a España. In May 2019, he was named in the startlist for the 2019 Giro d'Italia. In August 2020, he was named in the startlist for the 2020 Tour de France. He won the gold medal in the team pursuit at the 2020 Summer Olympics held at Tokyo in 2021, setting a new world record.

His younger sister Chiara Consonni is also a professional cyclist.

== Career achievements ==
=== Major results ===
==== Road ====
2011
National Junior Championships

3rd Road race
3rd Time trial

8th Overall Tre Ciclistica Internazionale Bresciana
2012
4th Trophée de la Ville de Loano
2014
2nd Gran Premio della Liberazione
5th La Popolarissima
2015
1st La Côte Picarde
2nd Road race, UCI World Under-23 Championships
2nd Gran Premio della Liberazione
4th La Popolarissima
4th Trofeo Città di San Vendemiano
6th Circuito del Porto
6th Giro del Belvedere
7th Gran Premio della Costa Etruschi
9th Trofeo Alcide Degasperi
2016
1st Road race, National Under-23 Championships
1st Trofeo Città di San Vendemiano
1st Gran Premio Industria e Commercio Artigianato Carnaghese
3rd Circuito del Porto
5th Gran Premio Bruno Beghelli
2017
1st Young rider classification, Three Days of De Panne
5th Grand Prix de Fourmies
6th Coppa Bernocchi
9th Bretagne Classic
9th Gran Premio Bruno Beghelli
2018 (1 pro win)
Tour of Slovenia

1st Points classification
1st Stage 1

5th London–Surrey Classic
2019
2nd Coppa Bernocchi
2nd Ronde van Limburg
4th Memorial Marco Pantani
8th Bredene Koksijde Classic
2021
4th Giro del Veneto
5th La Roue Tourangelle
8th Overall Tour Poitou-Charentes en Nouvelle-Aquitaine

1st Points classification

2022 (1)
1st Paris–Chauny
2nd Ronde van Limburg
4th Paris–Tours
6th Clásica de Almería
7th Classic Brugge–De Panne
7th Primus Classic
8th Eschborn–Frankfurt
9th Milano–Torino
10th Tour of Leuven
2023 (1)
7th Overall Saudi Tour

1st Stage 5

2024
4th Bredene Koksijde Classic
5th Classic Brugge–De Panne
5th Nokere Koerse
2025
1st Stage 1 (TTT) Volta a la Comunitat Valenciana

===== Grand Tour general classification results timeline =====
Grand Tour	2018	2019	2020	2021	2022	2023	2024	2025
Giro d'Italia	—	131	115	110	121	111	123	—
Tour de France	—	—	112	—	—	—	—	160
Vuelta a España	147	—	—	—	—	—	—	

Legend
—	Did not compete
DNF	Did not finish
IP	In progress

==== Track ====
2013
1st Omnium, National Championships
2015
2nd Elimination, UEC European Championships
2016
1st Omnium, National Championships
2nd Team pursuit, UEC European Championships
2017
1st Team pursuit, UCI World Cup, Pruszków
2nd Team pursuit, UEC European Championships
3rd Team pursuit, UCI World Championships
2018
UCI World Championships

3rd Omnium
3rd Team pursuit

2019
1st Six Days of London (with Elia Viviani)
3rd Six Days of Bremen (with Tristan Marguet)
2020
UCI World Championships

2nd Scratch
3rd Team pursuit

2021
1st Team pursuit, Olympic Games
UCI World Championships

1st Team pursuit
2nd Madison (with Michele Scartezzini)

2023
UEC European Championships

1st Points race
1st Team pursuit
2nd Madison (with Elia Viviani)
2nd Omnium

2nd Team pursuit, UCI World Championships
2024
1st Three Days of London (with Elia Viviani)
Olympic Games

2nd Madison (with Elia Viviani)
3rd Team pursuit

2nd Omnium, UCI World Championships
3rd Team pursuit, UEC European Championships
2025
3rd Six Days of Bremen (with Elia Viviani)

=== World records ===
Date	Time	Meet	Event	Location
3 August 2021	3:42.307	2020 Summer Olympics	Team pursuit (with Filippo Ganna, Francesco Lamon & Jonathan Milan)	Izu Velodrome, Japan
4 August 2021	3:42.032	2020 Summer Olympics	Team pursuit (with Filippo Ganna, Francesco Lamon & Jonathan Milan)	Izu Velodrome, Japan
