= Francesco Lamon =

Italian cyclist (born 1994)

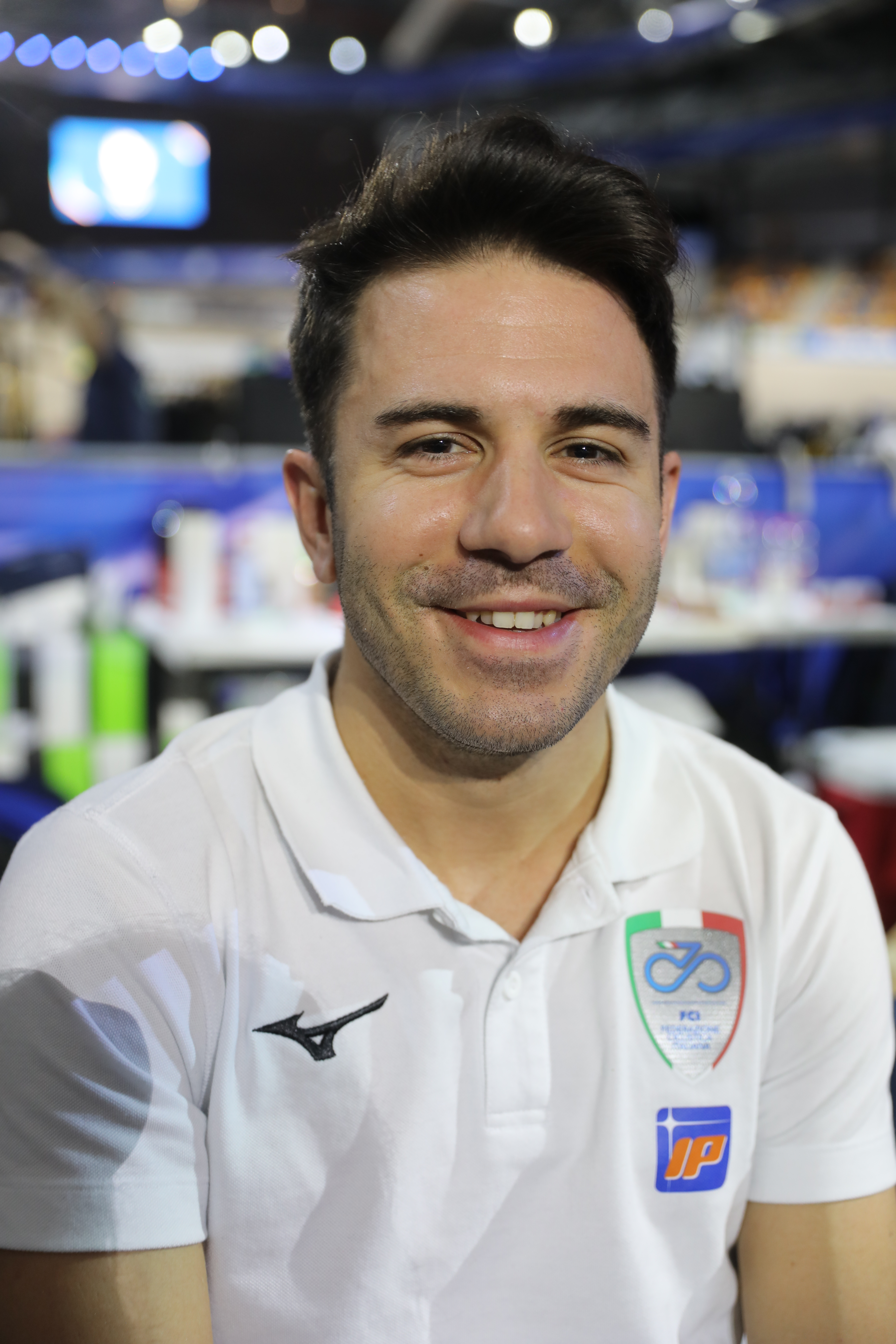
- Lamon in 2024

Personal information
- Born: 5 February 1994 (age 32) Mirano, Italy
- Height: 1.73 m (5 ft 8 in)
- Weight: 60 kg (132 lb)

Cycling career
- Sport: Cycling
- Current team: Biesse–Carrera–Premac
- Disciplines: Track; Road
- Role: Rider
- Rider type: Pursuitist (track)

Amateur teams
- 2009–2010: ASD U.C. Mirano
- 2011–2012: VC Bianchin Marchiol
- 2014–2018; 2018–: Team Colpack; Fiamme Azzurre
- 2019: Arvedi Cycling

Professional team
- 2020–: Biesse–Arvedi

Major wins
- Track Olympic Games Team pursuit (2021) World Championships Team pursuit (2021)
Medal record
Men's track cycling
Representing Italy
Olympic Games
Gold medal – first place	2020 Tokyo	Team pursuit
Bronze medal – third place	2024 Paris	Team pursuit
World Championships
Gold medal – first place	2021 Roubaix	Team pursuit
Silver medal – second place	2022 Saint-Quentin-en-Yvelines	Team pursuit
Silver medal – second place	2023 Glasgow	Team pursuit
Silver medal – second place	2026 Shanghai	Team pursuit
Bronze medal – third place	2017 Hong Kong	Team pursuit
Bronze medal – third place	2018 Apeldoorn	Team pursuit
Bronze medal – third place	2020 Berlin	Team pursuit
European Games
Silver medal – second place	2019 Minsk	1 km time trial
Silver medal – second place	2019 Minsk	Team pursuit
European Championships
Gold medal – first place	2018 Glasgow	Team pursuit
Gold medal – first place	2023 Grenchen	Team pursuit
Silver medal – second place	2016 Yvelines	Team pursuit
Silver medal – second place	2017 Berlin	Team pursuit
Silver medal – second place	2019 Apeldoorn	Team pursuit
Silver medal – second place	2020 Plovdiv	Team pursuit
Bronze medal – third place	2020 Plovdiv	Madison
Bronze medal – third place	2024 Apeldoorn	Team pursuit
U23 & Junior European Championships
Silver medal – second place	2016 Montichiari	U23 Team pursuit
Bronze medal – third place	2015 Athens	U23 Madison

Francesco Lamon (born 5 February 1994) is an Italian professional track and road cyclist, who currently rides for UCI Continental team Biesse–Carrera–Premac. He rode in the men's team pursuit at the 2016 UCI Track Cycling World Championships. He won the gold medal in the team pursuit at the 2020 Summer Olympics held at Tokyo in 2021, setting a new world record.

== Major results ==
=== Track ===
2016
2nd Team pursuit, UEC European Championships
2017
1st Team pursuit, UCI World Cup, Pruszków
2nd Team pursuit, UEC European Championships
3rd Team pursuit, UCI World Championships
2020
2nd Team pursuit, UEC European Championships
2021
1st Team pursuit, Olympic Games
1st Team pursuit, UCI World Championships
2022
UCI Nations Cup, Cali

1st Madison (with Michele Scartezzini)
1st Team pursuit

2nd Team pursuit, UCI World Championships
2023
1st Team pursuit, UEC European Championships
2nd Team pursuit, UCI World Championships
2nd Team pursuit, UCI Nations Cup, Milton
2024
3rd Team pursuit, Olympic Games
3rd Team pursuit, UEC European Championships
3rd Team pursuit, UCI Nations Cup, Adelaide
2026
2nd Team pursuit, UCI World Championships

==== World records ====
Date	Time	Meet	Event	Location
3 August 2021	3:42.307	2020 Olympics	Team Pursuit (with Filippo Ganna, Simone Consonni & Jonathan Milan)	Izu, Japan
4 August 2021	3:42.032	2020 Olympics	Team Pursuit (with Filippo Ganna, Simone Consonni & Jonathan Milan)	Izu, Japan

=== Road ===
2015
1st Memorial Denis Zanette e Daniele Del Ben
