= Manlio Moro =

Italian cyclist

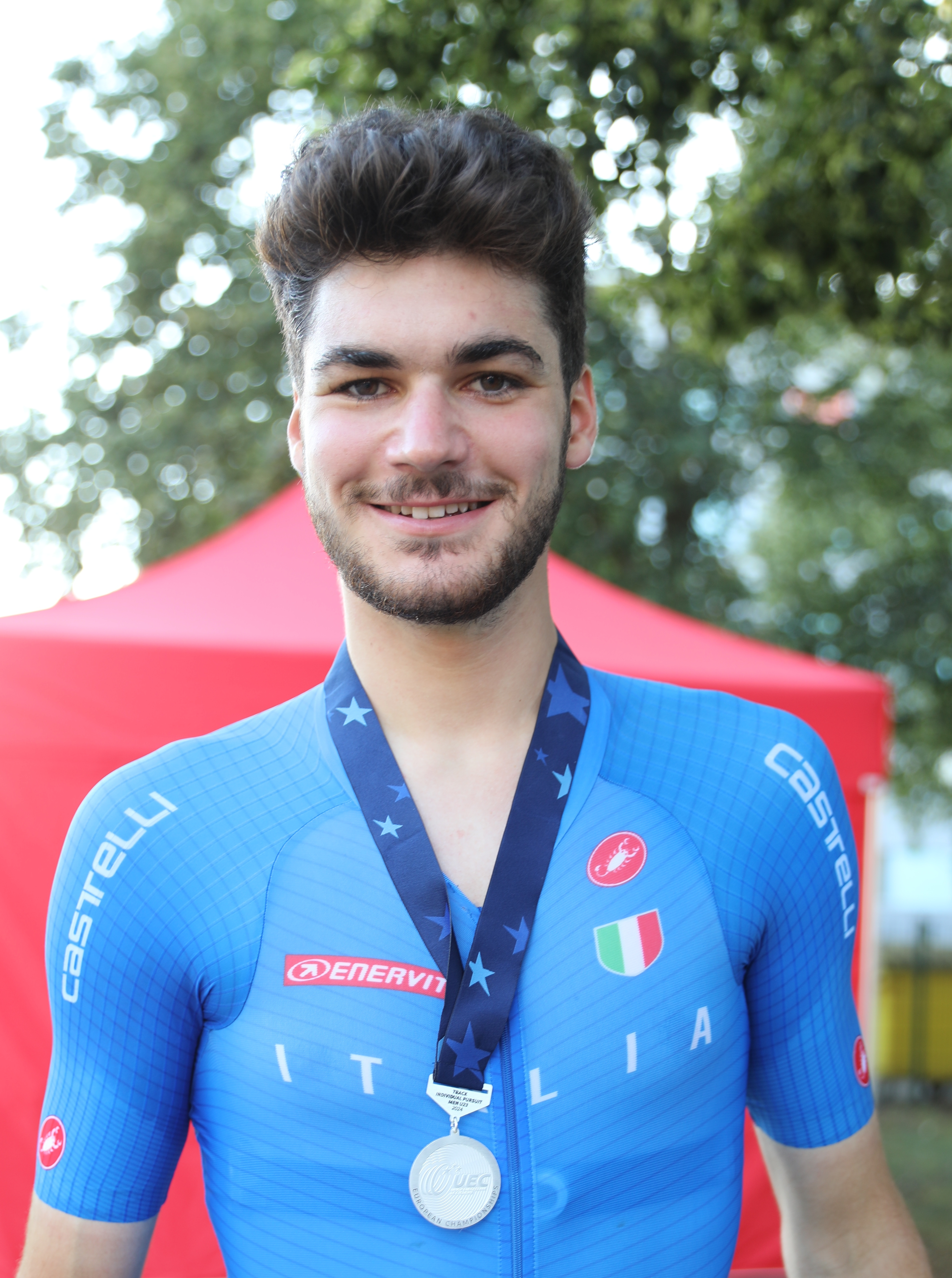
- Moro in 2024

Personal information
- Born: 17 March 2002 (age 24) Pordenone, Italy
- Height: 1.9 m (6 ft 3 in)

Cycling career
- Sport: Cycling
- Current team: Movistar Team
- Disciplines: Track; Road
- Role: Rider

Professional teams
- 2021–2023: Zalf Euromobil Fior
- 2024–: Movistar Team
Medal record
Men's track cycling
Representing Italy
World Championships
Silver medal – second place	2022 Saint-Quentin-en-Yvelines	Team pursuit
Silver medal – second place	2023 Glasgow	Team pursuit
European Championships
Gold medal – first place	2023 Grenchen	Team pursuit
Bronze medal – third place	2022 Munich	Individual pursuit

Manlio Moro (born 17 March 2002) is an Italian cyclist who currently rides for UCI WorldTeam Movistar Team.

== Major results ==
=== Track ===
2021
UEC European Under-23 Championships

3rd Individual pursuit
3rd Team pursuit

2022
UEC European Under-23 Championships

1st Team pursuit
3rd Individual pursuit

2nd Team pursuit, UCI World Championships
3rd Individual pursuit, UEC European Championships
2023
1st Team pursuit, UEC European Championships
2nd Team pursuit, UCI World Championships
2nd Team pursuit, UCI Nations Cup, Milton
2024
3rd Team pursuit, UCI Nations Cup, Adelaide

=== Road ===
2019
1st Gran Premio Eccellenze Valli del Soligo (TTT)
2021
1st Coppa Città di Bozzolo
2022
1st Trofeo Menci Spa
2023
1st Coppa Città di Castiglion Fiorentino
5th Memorial Polese
5th GP dell'Industria Civitanova Marche
7th GP Misano 100 Open Games
