= Nikola Wielowska =

Norwegian cyclist

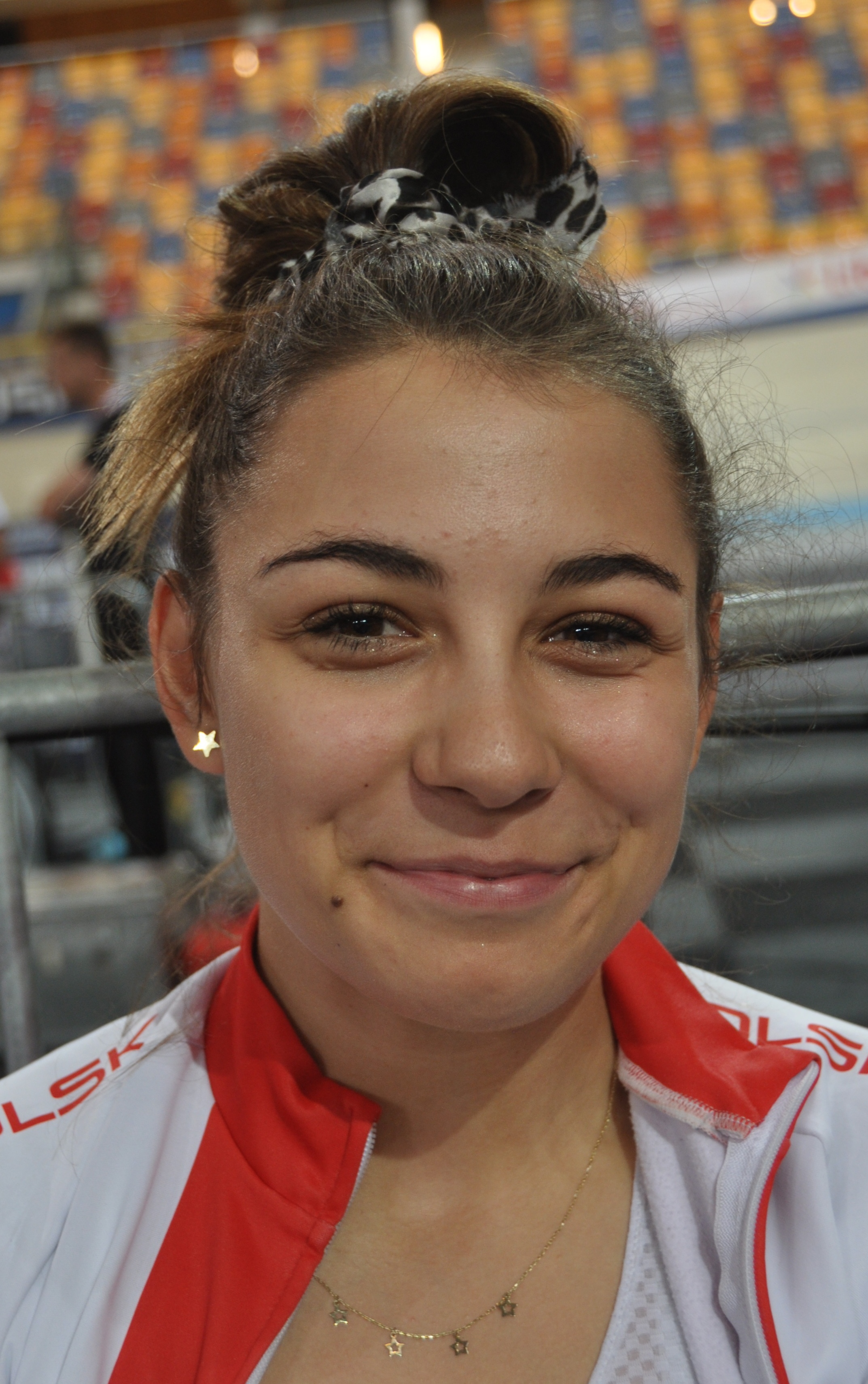
- Wielowska in 2021

Personal information
- Born: 4 December 2002 (age 23) Nowogard, Poland

Cycling career
- Sport: Cycling
- Discipline: Track
- Role: Rider
Medal record
Women's track cycling
Representing Poland
European Championships
Bronze medal – third place	2022 Munich	Scratch
World Junior Championships
Bronze medal – third place	2019 Frankfurt (Oder)	Team sprint
European Under-23 Championships
Bronze medal – third place	2023 Anadia	Team sprint

Nikola Wielowska (born 4 December 2002) is a Polish track cyclist. She won a bronze medal in the scratch race at the 2022 UEC European Track Championships.
