= 2022 UCI Track Cycling World Championships =

Cycling world championships

- Venue: Saint-Quentin-en-Yvelines, France
- Date: 12–16 October
- Velodrome: Vélodrome National
- Events: 22

The 2022 UCI Track Cycling World Championships started on 12 October and finished on 16 October 2022, at the Vélodrome National in Saint-Quentin-en-Yvelines, France.

== Schedule ==
22 events were held.

All times are local (UTC+2).

Date	Time	Event
12 October	13:30	Women's team pursuit qualifying
12 October	13:30	Men's team pursuit qualifying
12 October	18:30	Women's team sprint qualifying
12 October	18:30	Men's team sprint qualifying
12 October	18:30	Women's scratch final
12 October	18:30	Women's team sprint first round
12 October	18:30	Men's team sprint first round
12 October	18:30	Men's team pursuit first round
12 October	18:30	Women's team sprint final
12 October	18:30	Men's team sprint final
13 October	14:00	Men's keirin first round, repechage, second round
13 October	14:00	Women's sprint qualifying, 1/16, 1/8 final
13 October	18:30	Women's team pursuit first round
13 October	18:30	Women's sprint 1/4 final
13 October	18:30	Men's keirin third round
13 October	18:30	Men's team pursuit final
13 October	18:30	Women's elimination final
13 October	18:30	Men's keirin final
13 October	18:30	Men's scratch final
13 October	18:30	Women's team pursuit final
14 October	14:30	Women's omnium scratch, tempo race
14 October	14:30	Men's time trial qualifying
14 October	14:30	Men's individual pursuit qualifying
14 October	18:30	Men's points race
14 October	18:30	Women's sprint semifinals
14 October	18:30	Women's omnium, elimination
14 October	18:30	Men's time trial final
14 October	18:30	Men's individual pursuit final
14 October	18:30	Women's sprint final
14 October	18:30	Women's omnium, Points race

Date	Time	Event
15 October	12:00	Women's time trial qualifying
15 October	12:00	Men's sprint qualifying, 1/16, 1/8 final
15 October	12:00	Men's omnium scratch, tempo race
15 October	12:00	Women's madison qualifying
15 October	12:00	Men's omnium scratch, tempo race
15 October	12:00	Women's individual pursuit qualifying
15 October	17:30	Women's time trial final
15 October	17:30	Men's sprint 1/4 final
15 October	17:30	Women's madison
15 October	17:30	Men's omnium, elimination
15 October	17:30	Men's sprint 1/4 final
15 October	17:30	Women's individual pursuit final
15 October	17:30	Men's omnium, Points race
16 October	12:00	Men's sprint semifinals
16 October	12:00	Women's keirin, first round, repechage
16 October	13:30	Women's points race
16 October	13:30	Men's sprint finals
16 October	13:30	Women's keirin, second round
16 October	13:30	Men's madison
16 October	13:30	Women's keirin finals
16 October	13:30	Men's elimination

== Medal summary ==
=== Medal table ===
* Host nation (France)

Rank	Nation	Gold	Silver	Bronze	Total
1	Netherlands	4	4	2	10
2	Italy	4	3	0	7
3	France*	3	3	1	7
3	Germany	3	3	1	7
5	Great Britain	3	2	5	10
6	Belgium	2	0	2	4
7	Australia	1	1	1	3
8	United States	1	0	2	3
9	Canada	1	0	0	1
10	New Zealand	0	2	1	3
11	Japan	0	2	0	2
12	Denmark	0	1	2	3
13	China	0	1	1	2
14	Portugal	0	0	2	2
15	Colombia	0	0	1	1
15	Spain	0	0	1	1
Totals (16 entries)		22	22	22	66

=== Men ===
Event	Gold	Silver	Bronze
Individual pursuit	Filippo Ganna; Italy	Jonathan Milan; Italy	Ivo Oliveira; Portugal
Team pursuit	Great Britain; Ethan Hayter; Oliver Wood; Ethan Vernon; Daniel Bigham	Italy; Filippo Ganna; Simone Consonni; Jonathan Milan; Manlio Moro; Francesco Lamon	Denmark; Tobias Hansen; Carl-Frederik Bévort; Lasse Norman Hansen; Rasmus Pedersen
Sprint	Harrie Lavreysen; Netherlands	Matthew Richardson; Australia	Matthew Glaetzer; Australia
Team sprint	Australia; Matthew Glaetzer; Leigh Hoffman; Matthew Richardson; Thomas Cornish	Netherlands; Jeffrey Hoogland; Harrie Lavreysen; Roy van den Berg	Great Britain; Jack Carlin; Alistair Fielding; Hamish Turnbull
Keirin	Harrie Lavreysen; Netherlands	Jeffrey Hoogland; Netherlands	Kevin Quintero; Colombia
Madison	France; Donavan Grondin; Benjamin Thomas	Great Britain; Ethan Hayter; Oliver Wood	Belgium; Fabio Van Den Bossche; Lindsay De Vylder
Omnium	Ethan Hayter; Great Britain	Benjamin Thomas; France	Aaron Gate; New Zealand
Scratch	Dylan Bibic; Canada	Kazushige Kuboki; Japan	Roy Eefting; Netherlands
Points race	Yoeri Havik; Netherlands	Roger Kluge; Germany	Fabio Van den Bossche; Belgium
Elimination	Elia Viviani; Italy	Corbin Strong; New Zealand	Ethan Vernon; Great Britain
1 km time trial	Jeffrey Hoogland; Netherlands	Melvin Landerneau; France	Alejandro Martínez; Spain

=== Women ===
Event	Gold	Silver	Bronze
Individual pursuit	Franziska Brauße; Germany	Bryony Botha; New Zealand	Josie Knight; Great Britain
Team pursuit	Italy; Elisa Balsamo; Chiara Consonni; Martina Fidanza; Vittoria Guazzini; Martina Alzini	Great Britain; Neah Evans; Katie Archibald; Anna Morris; Josie Knight; Megan Barker	France; Marion Borras; Clara Copponi; Valentine Fortin; Victoire Berteau
Sprint	Mathilde Gros; France	Lea Friedrich; Germany	Emma Hinze; Germany
Team sprint	Germany; Pauline Grabosch; Emma Hinze; Lea Friedrich	China; Bao Shanju; Guo Yufang; Yuan Liying	Great Britain; Lauren Bell; Sophie Capewell; Emma Finucane
Keirin	Lea Friedrich; Germany	Mina Sato; Japan	Steffie van der Peet; Netherlands
Madison	Belgium; Shari Bossuyt; Lotte Kopecky	France; Clara Copponi; Valentine Fortin	Denmark; Amalie Dideriksen; Julie Leth
Omnium	Jennifer Valente; United States	Maike van der Duin; Netherlands	Maria Martins; Portugal
Scratch	Martina Fidanza; Italy	Maike van der Duin; Netherlands	Jessica Roberts; Great Britain
Points race	Neah Evans; Great Britain	Julie Leth; Denmark	Jennifer Valente; United States
Elimination	Lotte Kopecky; Belgium	Rachele Barbieri; Italy	Jennifer Valente; United States
500 m time trial	Taky Marie-Divine Kouamé; France	Emma Hinze; Germany	Guo Yufang; China

- Shaded events are non-Olympic
