= 2023 UCI Track Cycling World Championships =

2023 world track cycling championship hosted in the UK

- Venue: Glasgow, United Kingdom
- Date: 3–9 August
- Velodrome: Sir Chris Hoy Velodrome
- Events: 22

The 2023 UCI Track Cycling World Championships were held from 3 to 9 August 2023, at the Sir Chris Hoy Velodrome in Glasgow, United Kingdom. It was the 120th edition of the UCI Track Cycling World Championships, and was being held as part of the inaugural UCI Cycling World Championships.

== Schedule ==
A total of 22 events were held, with 11 events each for men and women, to be held within an integrated schedule with the concurrent 2023 UCI Para-cycling Track World Championships (each running over seven days).

All times listed below are for the local time – British Summer Time or UTC+01:00.

Date	Time	Event
3 August	09:30	Men's team pursuit qualifying
3 August	09:30	Women's team sprint qualifying
3 August	09:30	Men's team sprint qualifying
3 August	09:30	Women's individual pursuit qualifying
3 August	19:03	Women's team sprint first round
3 August	19:03	Women's individual pursuit final
3 August	19:03	Women's team sprint final
3 August	19:03	Men's scratch final
4 August	09:30	Women's team pursuit qualifying
4 August	09:30	Women's 500m time trial qualifying
4 August	18:42	Men's team pursuit first round
4 August	18:42	Women's 500m time trial final
4 August	18:42	Men's team sprint first round
4 August	18:42	Women's scratch final
4 August	18:42	Men's team sprint final
5 August	10:58	Men's sprint qualifying
5 August	10:58	Women's team pursuit first round
5 August	10:58	Men's sprint 1/16 finals
5 August	10:58	Men's sprint 1/8 finals
5 August	18:21	Women's keirin first round
5 August	18:21	Men's team pursuit final
5 August	18:21	Women's keirin first round repechage
5 August	18:21	Women's team pursuit final

Date	Time	Event
6 August	10:22	Men's individual pursuit qualifying
6 August	10:22	Women's keirin quarterfinals
6 August	10:22	Men's sprint quarterfinals
6 August	10:22	Men's omnium, scratch race
6 August	18:13	Women's keirin semifinals
6 August	18:13	Men's omnium, tempo race
6 August	18:13	Women's elimination race
6 August	18:13	Men's individual pursuit final
6 August	18:13	Men's omnium, elimination race
6 August	18:13	Women's keirin final
6 August	18:13	Men's omnium, points race
7 August	11:30	Women's sprint qualifying
7 August	11:30	Men's sprint semifinals
7 August	11:30	Women's sprint 1/16 finals
7 August	18:28	Men's elimination race
7 August	18:28	Men's sprint final
7 August	18:28	Women's madison

Date	Time	Event
8 August	12:30	Women's sprint 1/8 finals
8 August	12:30	Women's sprint quarterfinals
8 August	12:30	Men's 1km time trial qualifying
8 August	17:25	Men's 1km time trial final
8 August	17:25	Men's keirin first round
8 August	17:25	Women's points race
8 August	17:25	Men's keirin first round repechage
8 August	17:25	Men's madison
9 August	17:30	Women's sprint semifinals
9 August	17:30	Women's omnium, scratch race
9 August	17:30	Men's keirin second round
9 August	17:30	Women's omnium, tempo race
9 August	17:30	Women's sprint final
9 August	17:30	Men's keirin semifinal
9 August	17:30	Women's omnium, elimination race
9 August	17:30	Men's points race
9 August	17:30	Men's keirin final
9 August	17:30	Women's omnium, points race

== Medal summary ==
Events with a grey background are non-Olympic events.

=== Medal table ===
After 22 events.

* Host nation (Great Britain)

Rank	Nation	Gold	Silver	Bronze	Total
1	Great Britain*	5	3	1	9
2	Netherlands	4	1	0	5
3	United States	3	0	1	4
4	Germany	2	2	2	6
5	New Zealand	2	1	5	8
6	Belgium	2	0	3	5
7	Italy	1	1	2	4
8	Colombia	1	1	0	2
8	Denmark	1	1	0	2
10	Portugal	1	0	0	1
11	Australia	0	6	1	7
12	France	0	2	3	5
13	Japan	0	1	3	4
14	Canada	0	1	0	1
14	Spain	0	1	0	1
14	Trinidad and Tobago	0	1	0	1
17	China	0	0	1	1
Totals (17 entries)		22	22	22	66

=== Men ===
Event	Gold	Silver	Bronze
Individual pursuit	Filippo Ganna; Italy	Daniel Bigham; Great Britain	Jonathan Milan; Italy
Team pursuit	Denmark; Niklas Larsen; Carl-Frederik Bévort; Lasse Norman Leth; Rasmus Pedersen; Frederik Madsen	Italy; Filippo Ganna; Francesco Lamon; Jonathan Milan; Manlio Moro; Simone Consonni	New Zealand; Aaron Gate; Campbell Stewart; Thomas Sexton; Nick Kergozou
Sprint	Harrie Lavreysen; Netherlands	Nicholas Paul; Trinidad and Tobago	Jack Carlin; Great Britain
Team sprint	Netherlands; Roy van den Berg; Harrie Lavreysen; Jeffrey Hoogland	Australia; Leigh Hoffman; Matthew Richardson; Matthew Glaetzer; Thomas Cornish	France; Florian Grengbo; Sébastien Vigier; Rayan Helal
Keirin	Kevin Quintero; Colombia	Matthew Richardson; Australia	Shinji Nakano; Japan
Madison	Netherlands; Jan Willem van Schip; Yoeri Havik	Great Britain; Oliver Wood; Mark Stewart	New Zealand; Aaron Gate; Campbell Stewart
Omnium	Iúri Leitão; Portugal	Benjamin Thomas; France	Shunsuke Imamura; Japan
Scratch	William Tidball; Great Britain	Kazushige Kuboki; Japan	Tuur Dens; Belgium
Points race	Aaron Gate; New Zealand	Albert Torres; Spain	Fabio Van den Bossche; Belgium
Elimination	Ethan Vernon; Great Britain	Dylan Bibic; Canada	Elia Viviani; Italy
1 km time trial	Jeffrey Hoogland; Netherlands	Matthew Glaetzer; Australia	Thomas Cornish; Australia

=== Women ===
Event	Gold	Silver	Bronze
Individual pursuit	Chloé Dygert; United States	Franziska Brauße; Germany	Bryony Botha; New Zealand
Team pursuit	Great Britain; Katie Archibald; Elinor Barker; Josie Knight; Anna Morris; Megan Barker	New Zealand; Michaela Drummond; Ally Wollaston; Emily Shearman; Bryony Botha	France; Marion Borras; Valentine Fortin; Clara Copponi; Marie Le Net; Victoire Berteau
Sprint	Emma Finucane; Great Britain	Lea Friedrich; Germany	Ellesse Andrews; New Zealand
Team sprint	Germany; Pauline Grabosch; Emma Hinze; Lea Friedrich	Great Britain; Lauren Bell; Sophie Capewell; Emma Finucane	China; Guo Yufang; Bao Shanju; Yuan Liying
Keirin	Ellesse Andrews; New Zealand	Martha Bayona; Colombia	Lea Friedrich; Germany
Madison	Great Britain; Neah Evans; Elinor Barker	Australia; Georgia Baker; Alexandra Manly	France; Victoire Berteau; Clara Copponi
Omnium	Jennifer Valente; United States	Amalie Dideriksen; Denmark	Lotte Kopecky; Belgium
Scratch	Jennifer Valente; United States	Maike van der Duin; Netherlands	Michaela Drummond; New Zealand
Points race	Lotte Kopecky; Belgium	Georgia Baker; Australia	Tsuyaka Uchino; Japan
Elimination	Lotte Kopecky; Belgium	Valentine Fortin; France	Jennifer Valente; United States
500 m time trial	Emma Hinze; Germany	Kristina Clonan; Australia	Lea Friedrich; Germany
