= Noah Vandenbranden =

Belgian cyclist (born 2002)

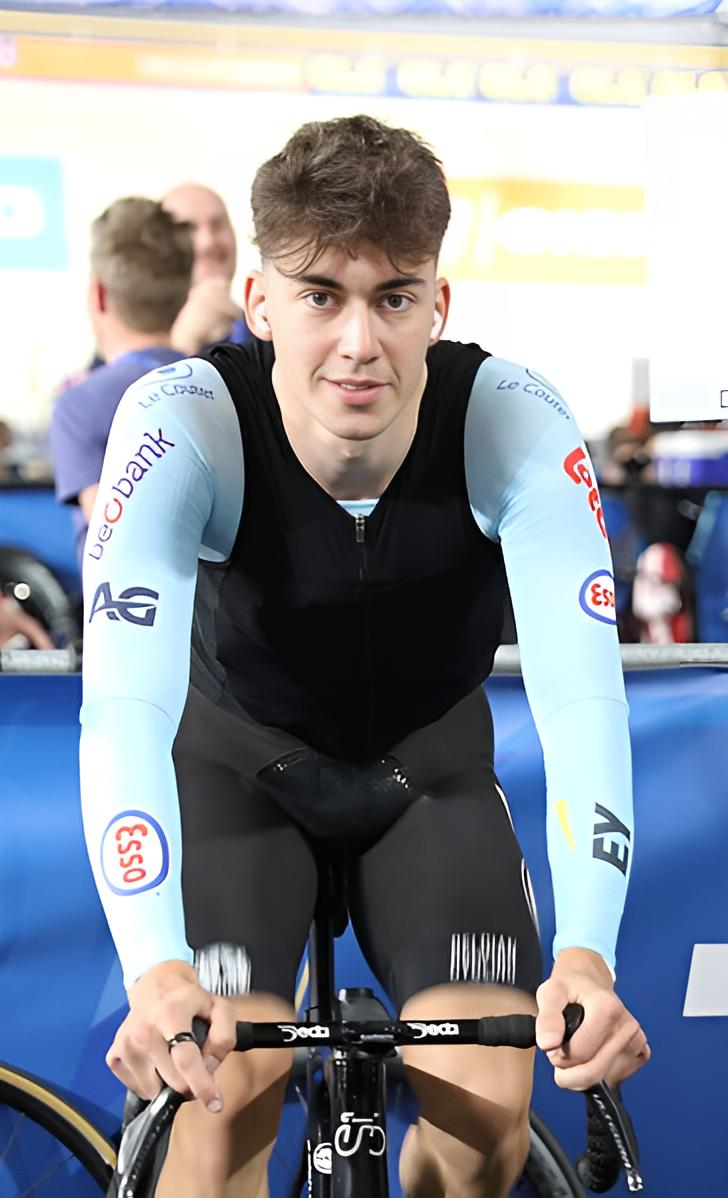
- Vandenbranden in 2024

Personal information
- Born: 29 July 2002 (age 24) Vilvoorde, Belgium
- Height: 1.81 m (5 ft 11 in)
- Weight: 74 kg (163 lb)

Cycling career
- Sport: Cycling
- Current team: Team Flanders–Baloise
- Disciplines: Track; Road
- Role: Rider

Amateur teams
- 2021: Acrog–Tormans
- 2022: Lotto–Soudal U23

Professional team
- 2023–: Team Flanders–Baloise
Medal record
Men's road bicycle racing
Representing Belgium
European Championships
| Bronze medal – third place | 2024 Limburg | Mixed team relay |

Noah Vandenbranden (born 29 July 2002) is a Belgian road and track cyclist, who currently rides for UCI ProTeam Team Flanders–Baloise.

== Career ==
In April 2023, he set a new Belgian record for the individual pursuit whilst competing in Ghent. In July 2023, he won gold in the individual pursuit at the 2023 U23 European Track Championships in Portugal with a new Belgian record time. He also won the points race, and won a silver in the team pursuit at the Championships. He competed for Belgium in the team pursuit at the 2023 UCI Track Cycling World Championships in Glasgow.

He was selected to compete for Belgium in Appledoorn for the team pursuit and individual pursuit at the 2024 UEC European Track Championships. In July 2024, he won the omnium at the 2024 European U23 Championships in Cottbus.

He competed at the 2024 Paris Olympics.

== Major results ==
=== Track ===
2020
UEC European Junior Championships

1st Kilo
2nd Scratch

2022
2nd Team pursuit, UEC European Under-23 Championships
2023
UEC European Under-23 Championships

1st Points race
1st Individual pursuit
2nd Madison (with Gianluca Pollefliet)
3rd Team pursuit

2024
UEC European Under-23 Championships

1st Individual pursuit
1st Omnium
2nd Team pursuit
3rd Madison (with Tom Crabbe)

1st Individual pursuit, National Championships
2025
3rd Madison, UCI Nations Cup, Konya (with Jules Hesters)

=== Road ===
2021
3rd Time trial, National Under-23 Championships
2024
3rd Mixed relay, European Road Championships
4th Time trial, National Championships
2025
10th Grote Prijs Jean-Pierre Monseré
