= Carl-Frederik Bévort =

Danish cyclist (born 2003)

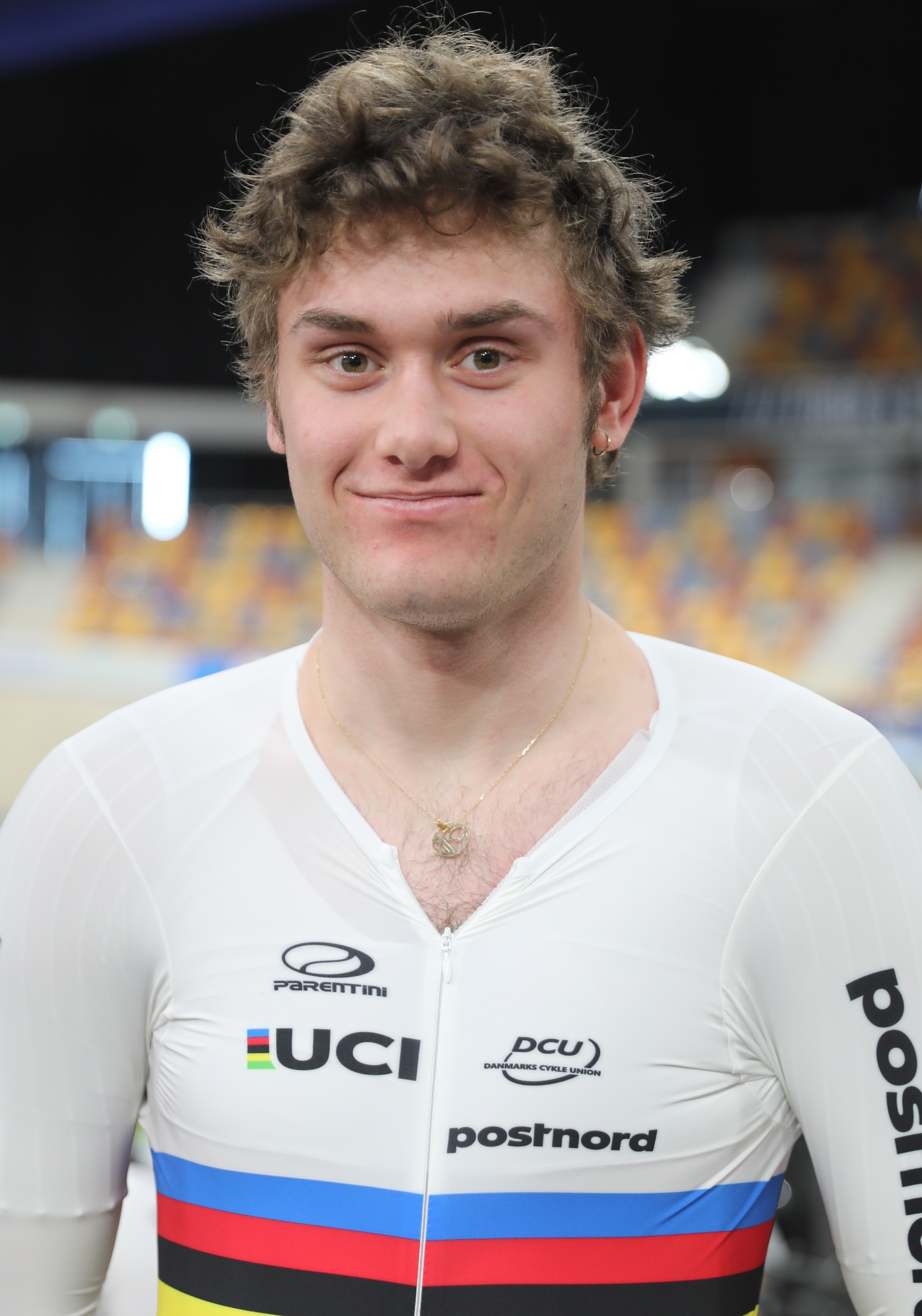
- Bévort in 2024

Personal information
- Full name: Carl-Frederik Bévort
- Born: 24 November 2003 (age 22) Copenhagen, Denmark
- Height: 1.84 m (6 ft 0 in)

Cycling career
- Sport: Cycling
- Current team: Uno-X Mobility
- Disciplines: Track, road
- Role: Rider

Professional teams
- 2022–2023: Uno-X Dare Development Team
- 2024–: Uno-X Mobility

Major wins
- Track World Championships Team pursuit (2023, 2024, 2026) Madison (2026)
Medal record
Representing Denmark
Men's track cycling
World Championships
| Gold medal – first place | 2023 Glasgow | Team pursuit |
| Gold medal – first place | 2024 Ballerup | Team pursuit |
| Gold medal – first place | 2026 Shanghai | Team pursuit |
| Gold medal – first place | 2026 Shanghai | Madison |
| Bronze medal – third place | 2022 Saint-Quentin-en-Yvelines | Team pursuit |
European Championships
| Gold medal – first place | 2021 Grenchen | Team pursuit |
| Silver medal – second place | 2022 Munich | Team pursuit |
| Silver medal – second place | 2024 Apeldoorn | Team pursuit |
Men's road bicycle racing
European Championships
| Silver medal – second place | 2023 Drenthe | Under-23 time trial |

Carl-Frederik Bévort (born 24 November 2003) is a Danish road and track cyclist, who currently rides for UCI ProTeam Uno-X Mobility. He was part of the team that won the team pursuit at the 2021 UEC European Track Championships.

== Major results ==
=== Road ===
2020
2nd Time trial, National Junior Championships
2021
National Junior Championships

1st Road race
1st Time trial

4th Time trial, UCI World Junior Championships
2022
3rd Road race, National Under-23 Championships
6th Time trial, UCI World Under-23 Championships
2023
1st Time trial, National Under-23 Championships
1st Fyen Rundt
1st Stage 3 (TTT) Tour de l'Avenir
2nd Time trial, UEC European Under-23 Championships
2024
5th Route Adélie
2025
1st Stage 3 Tour de l'Avenir
7th Omloop van het Houtland
9th Chrono des Nations
2026 (1 pro win)
CRO Race

1st Points classification
1st Stage 2

=== Track ===
2020
2nd Individual pursuit, UEC European Junior Championships
2021
1st Team pursuit, UEC European Championships
2022
National Championships

1st Individual pursuit
1st Kilo

3rd Team pursuit, UCI World Championships
3rd Team pursuit, UCI Nations Cup, Glasgow
2023
1st Team pursuit, UCI World Championships
2024
1st Team pursuit, UCI World Championships
2nd Team pursuit, UEC European Championships
2026
UCI World Championships

1st Madison (with Lasse Norman Leth)
1st Team pursuit
