= Valentin Tabellion =

French cyclist

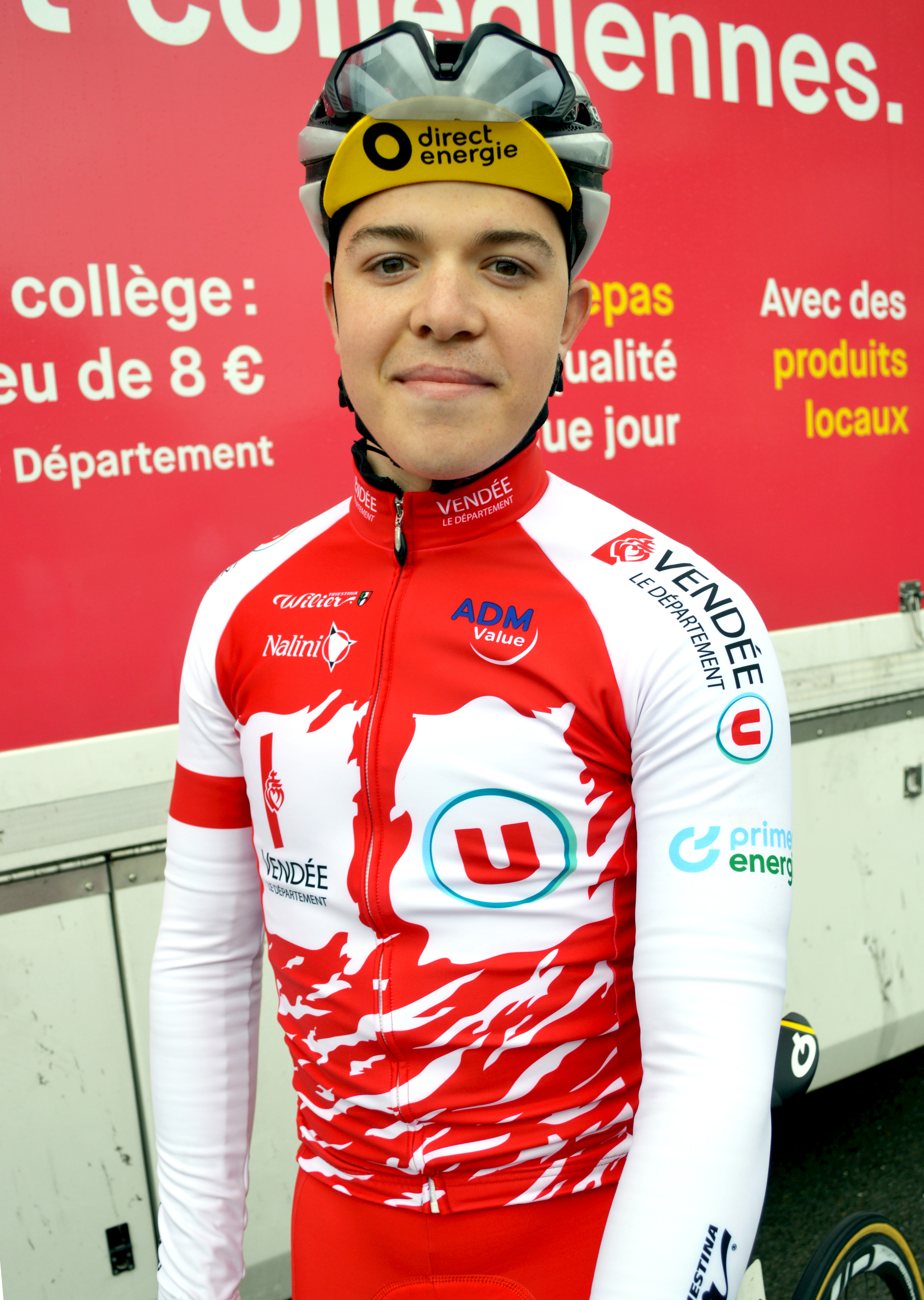
- Tabellion in 2019

Personal information
- Born: 23 March 1999 (age 27) Boulogne-Billancourt, France

Cycling career
- Sport: Cycling
- Current team: Van Rysel–Roubaix
- Disciplines: Road; Track
- Role: Rider

Amateur teams
- 2016–2017: USM Saran Cyclisme
- 2018–2020: Vendée U

Professional team
- 2021–: Xelliss–Roubaix–Lille Métropole
Medal record
Men's track cycling
Representing France
World Championships
Silver medal – second place	2021 Roubaix	Team pursuit
European Championships
Gold medal – first place	2022 Munich	Team pursuit

Valentin Tabellion (born 23 March 1999) is a French professional racing cyclist, who currently rides for UCI Continental team Van Rysel–Roubaix. He rode in the men's team pursuit event at the 2020 UCI Track Cycling World Championships in Berlin, Germany.

== Major results ==
=== Road ===
2022
2nd Overall Tour d'Eure-et-Loir

1st Points classification
1st Stage 2

10th Overall Ronde de l'Oise

=== Track ===
2016
National Junior Championships

1st Individual pursuit
1st Scratch
1st Kilo
2nd Team pursuit

2017
3rd Omnium, UEC European Junior Championships
3rd Individual pursuit, National Junior Championships
2018
National Championships

2nd Points race
2nd Team pursuit

2019
UCI World Cup

1st Team pursuit, Milton
2nd Team pursuit, Minsk
3rd Team pursuit, Glasgow

National Championships

1st Team pursuit
3rd Madison

2021
National Championships

1st Madison (with Thomas Denis)
1st Team pursuit
2nd Individual pursuit

2nd Team pursuit, UCI World Championships
2023
3rd Team pursuit, UCI Nations Cup, Milton
