= Thomas Denis =

French cyclist (born 1997)

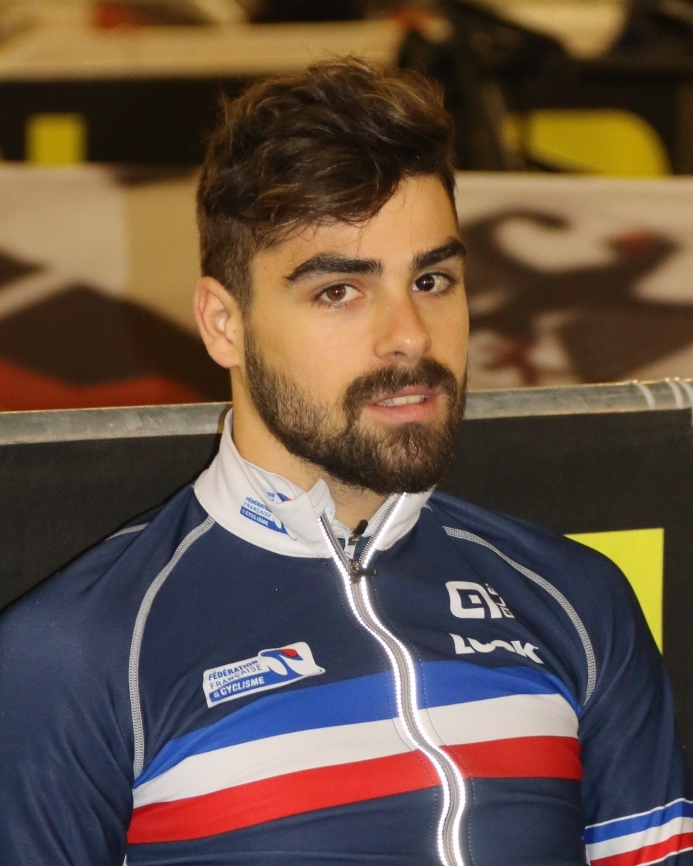
- Denis in 2017

Personal information
- Born: 18 July 1997 (age 29) Bignan, France
- Height: 1.80 m (5 ft 11 in)
- Weight: 68 kg (150 lb)

Cycling career
- Sport: Cycling
- Current team: Paris Cycliste Olympique
- Disciplines: Track; Road
- Role: Rider

Amateur teams
- 2011–2015: AC Lanester 56
- 2016–2020: Vendée U
- 2024–: Paris Cycliste Olympique

Professional team
- 2021–2023: Xelliss–Roubaix–Lille Métropole
Medal record
Men's track cycling
Representing France
World Championships
Silver medal – second place	2021 Roubaix	Team pursuit
European Championships
Gold medal – first place	2016 Yvelines	Team pursuit
Gold medal – first place	2017 Berlin	Team pursuit
Gold medal – first place	2022 Munich	Team pursuit
Bronze medal – third place	2023 Grenchen	Team pursuit

Thomas Denis (born 18 July 1997) is a French track and road cyclist, who currently rides for club team Paris Cycliste Olympique. Representing France at international competitions, Denis won the gold medal at the 2016 UEC European Track Championships in the team pursuit.

== Major results ==
=== Track ===
2014
National Championships

2nd Team pursuit
3rd Madison

2015
National Championships

1st Individual pursuit
2nd Kilo
2nd Team pursuit

2nd Individual pursuit, UEC European Under-23 Championships
2016
1st Team pursuit, UEC European Championships
UEC European Under-23 Championships

1st Team pursuit
3rd Individual pursuit

2nd Scratch race, UCI World Cup, Los Angeles
National Championships

2nd Team pursuit
3rd Individual pursuit

2017
1st Team pursuit, UEC European Championships
National Championships

1st Team pursuit
2nd Madison
2nd Omnium

3rd Team pursuit,, UCI World Cup, Manchester
2019
UCI World Cup

1st Team pursuit, Milton
2nd Team pursuit, Minsk
3rd Team pursuit, Glasgow

National Championships

1st Team pursuit
2nd Individual pursuit

2nd Madison (with Donavan Grondin), UEC European Under-23 Championships
2021
National Championships

1st Madison (with Valentin Tabellion)
2nd Team pursuit

2nd Team pursuit, UCI World Championships
2023
3rd Team pursuit, UEC European Championships

=== Road ===
2014
2nd Chrono des Nations Juniors
2015
3rd Chrono des Nations Juniors
10th Overall Trophée Centre Morbihan
2017
4th Time trial, National Under-23 Road Championships
2019
2nd Time trial, National Under-23 Road Championships
