= Nicolas Heinrich =

German cyclist

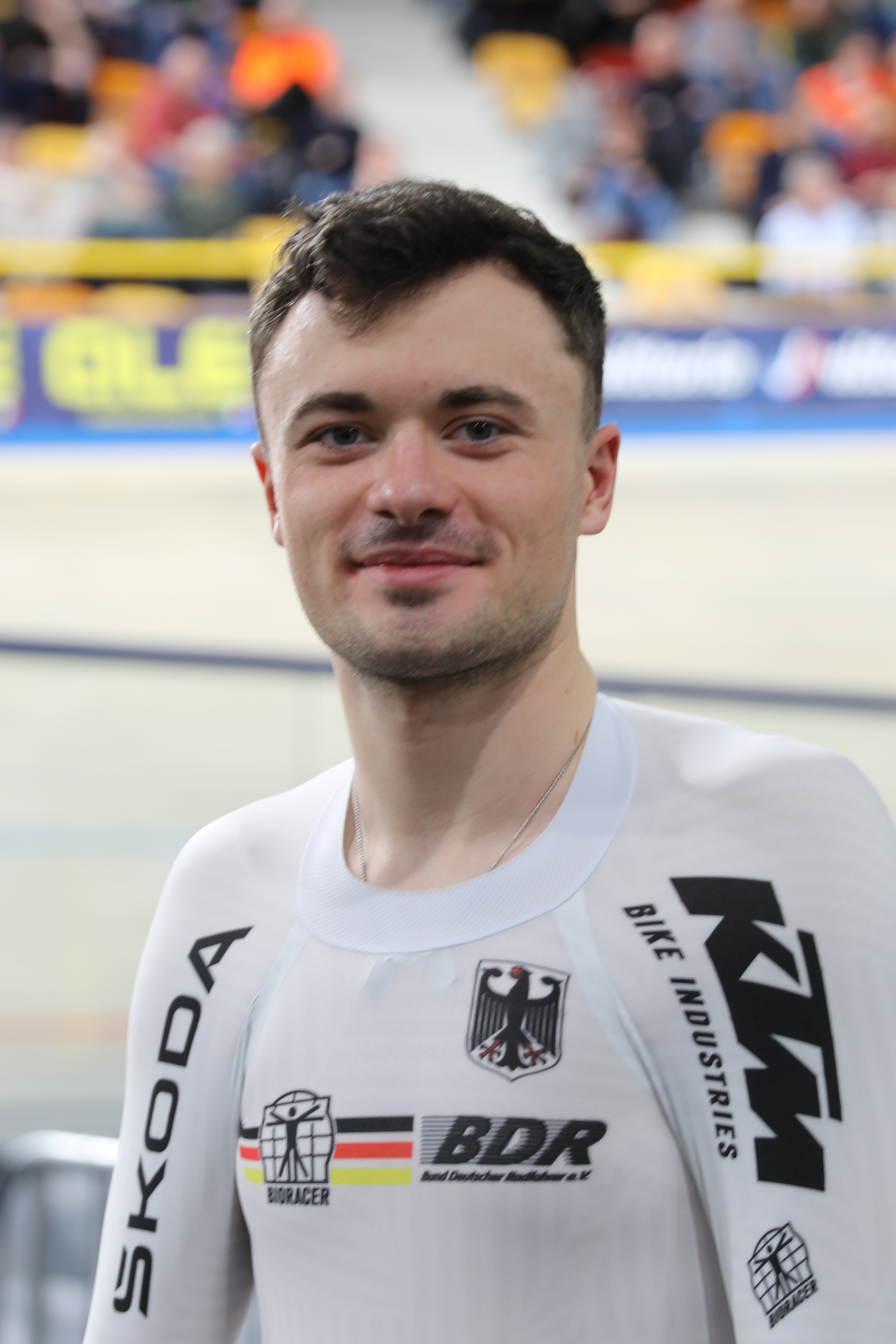
- Heinrich in 2024

Personal information
- Born: 2 December 2001 (age 24) Zwickau, Germany
- Height: 1.81 m (5 ft 11 in)
- Weight: 76 kg (168 lb)

Cycling career
- Sport: Cycling
- Current team: Rad-Net Oßwald
- Disciplines: Track; Road
- Role: Rider

Amateur team
- 2012–2019: ESV Lok Zwickau

Professional team
- 2020–: Rad-Net Rose Team
Medal record
Men's track cycling
Representing Germany
European Championships
Gold medal – first place	2022 Munich	Individual pursuit
World Junior Championships
Gold medal – first place	2019 Frankfurt	Team pursuit
Silver medal – second place	2019 Frankfurt	Individual pursuit
European Under-23 & Junior Championships
Gold medal – first place	2022 Anadia	Under-23 individual pursuit
Gold medal – first place	2019 Ghent	Junior individual pursuit
Silver medal – second place	2021 Apeldoorn	Under-23 individual pursuit
Bronze medal – third place	2019 Ghent	Junior team pursuit
Bronze medal – third place	2020 Fiorenzuola d'Arda	Under-23 team pursuit

Nicolas Heinrich (born 2 December 2001) is a German road and track cyclist, who currently rides for UCI Continental team Rad-Net Oßwald.

== Major results ==
=== Track ===
2019
UCI Junior Track World Championships

1st Team pursuit
2nd Individual pursuit

UEC European Junior Track Championships

1st Individual pursuit
3rd Team pursuit

2020
3rd Team pursuit, UEC European Under-23 Track Championships
2021
2nd Individual pursuit, UEC European Under-23 Track Championships
2022
1st Individual pursuit, UEC European Under-23 Track Championships
National Championships

1st Individual pursuit
1st Team pursuit

UCI Nations Cup

1st Individual pursuit, Milton
2nd Individual pursuit, Glasgow
3rd Team pursuit, Milton

=== Road ===
2019
3rd Time trial, National Junior Road Championships
3rd Overall Internationale Cottbuser Junioren-Etappenfahrt
