= Bartosz Rudyk =

Polish cyclist (born 1998)

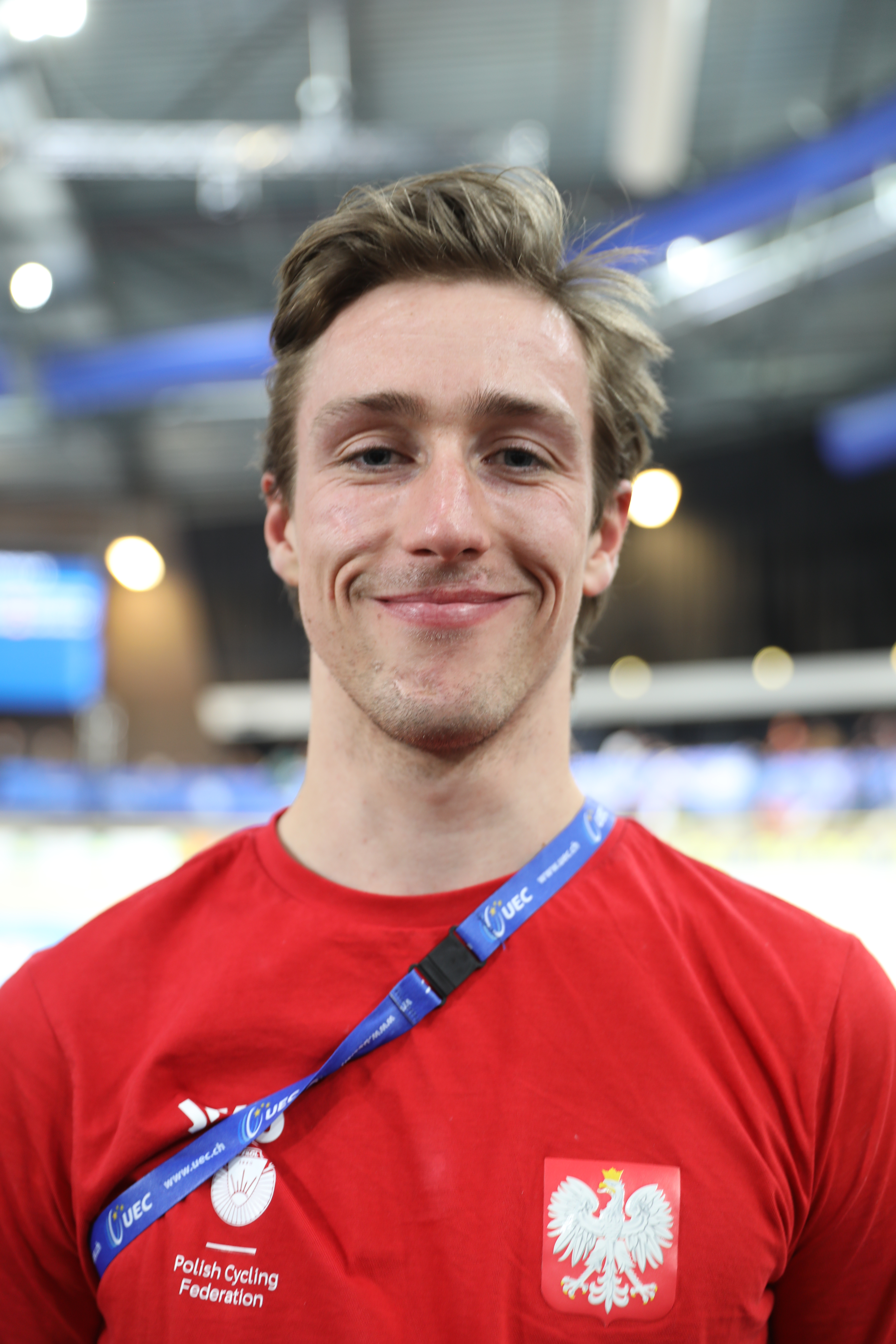
- Rudyk in 2024

Personal information
- Full name: Bartosz Rudyk
- Born: 18 September 1998 (age 28) Wrocław, Poland
- Height: 1.89 m (6 ft 2 in)
- Weight: 76 kg (168 lb)

Cycling career
- Sport: Cycling
- Current team: ATT Investments
- Disciplines: Road; Track
- Role: Rider

Amateur teams
- 2017–2019: ALKS Stal–Ocetix–Iglotex
- 2021: TC Chrobry Scott Glogow

Professional teams
- 2020: Wibatech Merx 7R
- 2022: Santic–Wibatech
- 2023: Voster ATS Team
- 2024: ATT Investments

Bartosz Rudyk (born 18 September 1998) is a Polish racing cyclist, who currently rides for UCI Continental team ATT Investments. He rode in the men's individual pursuit event at the 2018 UCI Track Cycling World Championships.

== Major results ==
=== Track ===
2016
2nd Team pursuit, UEC European Junior Championships
2017
National Championships

2nd Individual pursuit
3rd Madison

3rd Team pursuit, UEC European Under-23 Championships
2018
National Championships

2nd Madison
2nd Team pursuit

2019
1st Team pursuit, National Championships
2020
UEC European Under-23 Championships

1st Scratch
3rd Madison (with Filip Prokopyszyn)

2021
1st Individual pursuit, National Championships

=== Road ===
2016
6th Overall La Coupe du Président de la Ville de Grudziądz

1st Stage 4

2020
6th Puchar Ministra Obrony Narodowej
2021
6th Puchar Ministra Obrony Narodowej
2022
5th Umag Trophy
5th Grand Prix Wyszków
2023
1st Puchar Ministra Obrony Narodowej
2nd Overall Dookoła Mazowsza

1st Stage 4

3rd Overall Belgrade Banjaluka

1st Stage 1

2024
International Tour of Hellas

1st Points classification
1st Stage 5

2nd Road race, National Road Championships
3rd Overall Dookoła Mazowsza

1st Stage 2

6th Memoriał Andrzeja Trochanowskiego
7th GP Polski
9th Puchar MON
10th Ronde van Overijssel
2025
1st Grand Prix Apollon Temple
