= Tuur Dens =

Belgian cyclist (born 2000)

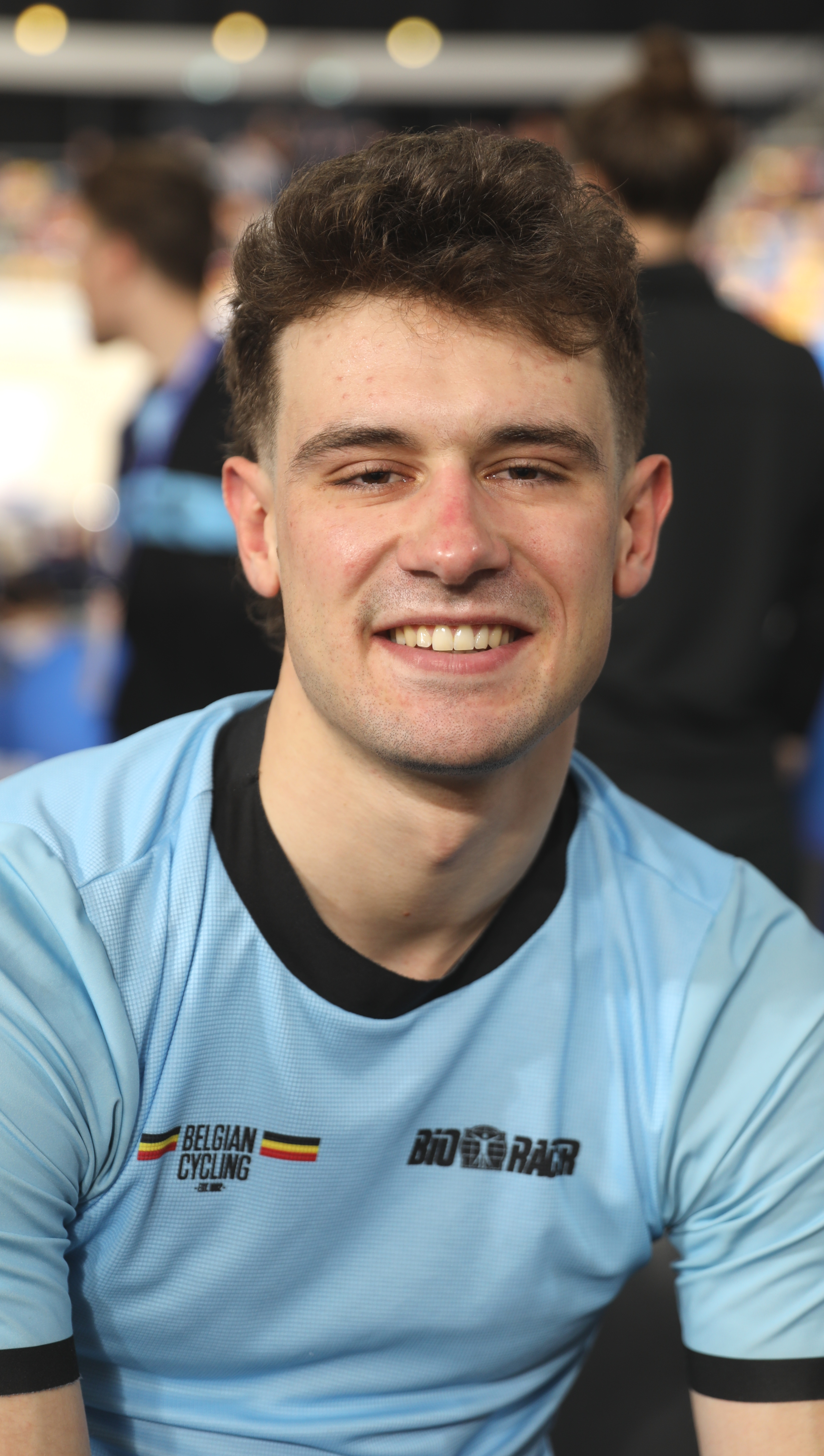
- Dens in 2024

Personal information
- Born: 26 June 2000 (age 26) Rotselaar, Belgium
- Height: 1.84 m (6 ft 0 in)
- Weight: 81 kg (179 lb)

Cycling career
- Sport: Cycling
- Current team: Team Flanders–Baloise
- Disciplines: Road; Track
- Role: Rider

Amateur teams
- 2017–2018: Davo CT–Tongeren Junior
- 2019: Hubo–Titan Cargo
- 2020: VDM Van Durme–Michiels–Trawobo
- 2021: Hubo–Titan Cargo

Professional team
- 2022–: Sport Vlaanderen–Baloise
Medal record
Men's track cycling
Representing Belgium
World Championships
Silver medal – second place	2021 Roubaix	Scratch
Bronze medal – third place	2023 Glasgow	Scratch
European U23 Championships
Silver medal – second place	2022 Anadia	Team Pursuit
Silver medal – second place	2021 Apeldoorn	Scratch
Bronze medal – third place	2020 Fiorenzuola d'Arda	Scratch

Tuur Dens (born 26 June 2000) is a Belgian racing cyclist, who currently rides for UCI ProTeam Team Flanders–Baloise. He won a silver resp. bronze medal in the scratch event at the 2021 and 2023 UCI Track Cycling World Championships.

== Major results ==
2017
National Junior Championships

1st Kilo
1st Scratch

2018
1st Kilo, National Championships
2019
1st Keirin, National Championships
2020
3rd Scratch, UEC European Under-23 Championships
2021
1st Madison, UCI Nations Cup, Cali (with Kenny De Ketele)
2nd Scratch, UCI World Championships
2nd Scratch, UEC European Under-23 Championships
2023
3rd Scratch, UCI World Championships
