= Tobias Buck-Gramcko =

German cyclist (born 2001)

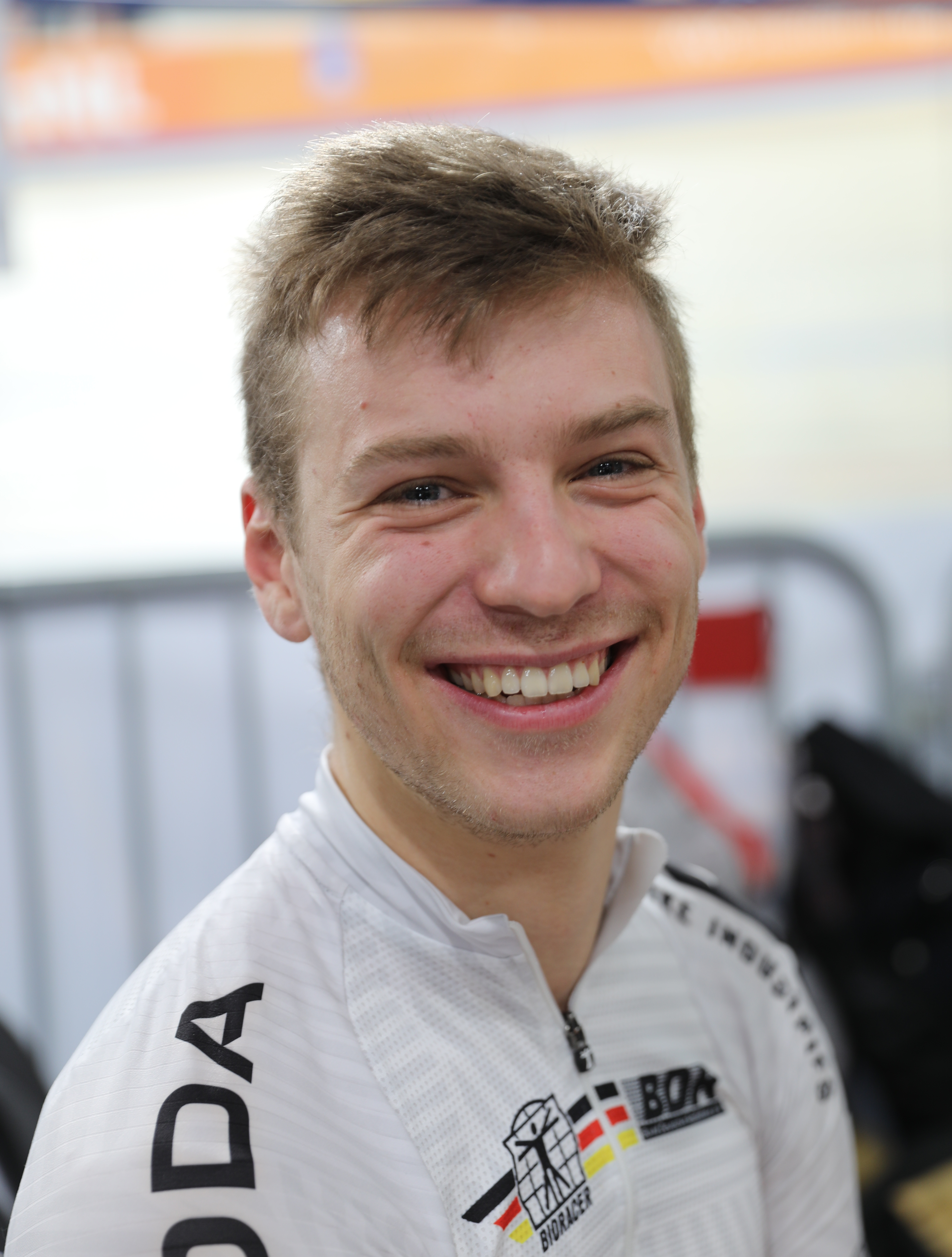
- Buck-Gramcko in 2024

Personal information
- Born: 1 January 2001 (age 25) Göttingen, Germany
- Height: 1.88 m (6 ft 2 in)
- Weight: 76 kg (168 lb)

Cycling career
- Sport: Cycling
- Current team: Rad-Net Oßwald
- Disciplines: Road; Track
- Role: Rider

Amateur team
- 2015–2019: Tuspo Weende

Professional team
- 2020–: Rad-Net Rose Team
Medal record
Men's track cycling
Representing Germany
European Championships
Bronze medal – third place	2023 Grenchen	Individual pursuit
World Junior Championships
Gold medal – first place	2019 Frankfurt	Individual pursuit
Gold medal – first place	2019 Frankfurt	Team pursuit
Gold medal – first place	2019 Frankfurt	Kilometer
European Under-23 & Junior Championships
Gold medal – first place	2021 Apeldoorn	Under-23 individual pursuit
Silver medal – second place	2019 Ghent	Junior individual pursuit
Silver medal – second place	2022 Anadia	Under-23 individual pursuit
Bronze medal – third place	2018 Aigle	Junior team pursuit
Bronze medal – third place	2019 Ghent	Junior team pursuit
Bronze medal – third place	2020 Fiorenzuola d'Arda	Under-23 team pursuit
Men's road bicycle racing
European Championships
Gold medal – first place	2022 Anadia	Under-23 team time trial

Tobias Buck-Gramcko (born 1 January 2001) is a German road and track cyclist. He competed in the team pursuit and the individual pursuit at the 2021 UCI Track Cycling World Championships.

== Major results ==
=== Track ===
2018
3rd Team pursuit, UEC European Junior Championships
2019
UCI World Junior Championships

1st Individual pursuit
1st Kilo
1st Team pursuit

National Junior Championships

1st Individual pursuit
1st Kilo

UEC European Junior Championships

2nd Individual pursuit
3rd Team pursuit

2020
3rd Team pursuit, UEC European Under-23 Championships
2021
1st Individual pursuit, UEC European Under-23 Championships
2022
1st Team pursuit, National Championships
2nd Individual pursuit, UEC European Under-23 Championships
UCI Nations Cup

2nd Individual pursuit, Milton
3rd Team pursuit, Milton

2023
3rd Individual pursuit, UEC European Championships

=== Road ===
2020
3rd Time trial, National Under-23 Championships
2021
5th Time trial, National Under-23 Championships
2022
1st Team relay, UEC European Under-23 Championships
2nd Time trial, National Under-23 Championships
