= 2024 UCI Track Cycling World Championships – Men's scratch =

Men's scratch at the 2024 UCI Track Cycling World Championships
- Venue: Ballerup Super Arena
- Location: Ballerup, Denmark
- Dates: 17 October
- Competitors: 24 from 24 nations

Medalists
gold medal	Kazushige Kuboki	Japan
silver medal	Tobias Hansen	Denmark
bronze medal	Clément Petit	France

The Men's scratch competition at the 2024 UCI Track Cycling World Championships was held on 17 October 2024.

== Results ==
The race was started at 20:51. First rider across the line without a net lap loss won.

Rank	Name	Nation	Laps down
1st place, gold medalist(s)	Kazushige Kuboki	Japan	
2nd place, silver medalist(s)	Tobias Hansen	Denmark	
3rd place, bronze medalist(s)	Clément Petit	France	
4	Vincent Hoppezak	Netherlands	
5	Jules Hesters	Belgium	
6	Noah Hobbs	United Kingdom	
7	Filip Prokopyszyn	Poland	
8	Kelland O'Brien	Australia	
9	Tim Torn Teutenberg	Germany	
10	Diogo Narciso	Portugal	
11	Alex Vogel	Switzerland	
12	Sebastián Mora	Spain	
13	Matyaš Kobližek	Czech Republic	−1
14	Martin Chren	Slovakia	−1
15	Vladyslav Loginov	Israel	−1
16	Elia Viviani	Italy	−1
17	Fernando Nava Romo	Mexico	−1
18	Dylan Bibic	Canada	−1
19	Ilya Karabutov	Kazakhstan	−2
20	Colby Lange	United States	−2
21	Chu Tsun Wai	Hong Kong	−2
22	Akil Campbell	Trinidad and Tobago	−2
–	Terry Yudha Kusuma	Indonesia	Did not finish
–	Vitaliy Hryniv	Ukraine	Did not finish
