= 2026 UCI Track Cycling World Championships – Men's omnium =

Men's omnium at the 2026 UCI Track Cycling World Championships
- Venue: Shanghai Velodrome
- Location: Shanghai, China
- Dates: 17 October
- Competitors: 24 from 24 nations
- Winning points: 143

Medalists
gold medal	Iúri Leitão	Portugal
silver medal	Fabio Van Den Bossche	Belgium
bronze medal	Tim Torn Teutenberg	Germany

The Men's omnium competition at the 2026 UCI Track Cycling World Championships was held on 17 October 2026.

== Results ==
=== Scratch race ===
The scratch race was started at 12:20.

Rank	Name	Nation	Laps down	Event points
1	Iúri Leitão	Portugal		40
2	Kazushige Kuboki	Japan	−1	38
3	Adam Křenek	Czechia	−1	36
4	Tobias Hansen	Denmark	−1	34
5	Fabio Van Den Bossche	Belgium	−1	32
6	Oscar Nilsson-Julien	France	−1	30
7	Tim Torn Teutenberg	Germany	−1	28
8	Henry Hobbs	Great Britain	−1	26
9	Sebastián Mora	Spain	−1	24
10	Simone Consonni	Italy	−1	22
11	Daniel Staniszewski	Poland	−1	20
12	Keegan Hornblow	New Zealand	−1	18
13	Ilya Savekin	Individual Neutral Athletes	−1	16
14	Clever Martínez	Venezuela	−1	14
15	Alex Vogel	Switzerland	−1	12
16	Tim Wafler	Austria	−1	10
17	Wu Junjie	China	−1	8
18	Conor Leahy	Australia	−1	6
19	Ricardo Peña	Mexico	−1	4
20	Yanne Dorenbos	Netherlands	−1	2
21	Tomás Moyano	Argentina	−1	1
22	Ramazan Yılmaz	Turkey	−1	1
23	Alisher Zhumakan	Kazakhstan	−1	1
24	Grant Koontz	United States	DNF	1

=== Tempo race ===
The tempo race was started at 14:51.

Rank	Name	Nation	Lap points	Sprint points	Total points	Finish order	Event points
1	Tim Torn Teutenberg	Germany	20	8	28	21	40
2	Sebastián Mora	Spain	20	3	23	18	38
3	Iúri Leitão	Portugal	20	2	22	14	36
4	Henry Hobbs	United Kingdom	0	5	5	1	34
5	Fabio Van Den Bossche	Belgium	0	5	5	15	32
6	Keegan Hornblow	New Zealand	0	3	3	9	30
7	Tim Wafler	Austria	0	3	3	16	28
8	Tobias Hansen	Denmark	0	2	2	3	26
9	Daniel Staniszewski	Poland	0	2	2	17	24
10	Simone Consonni	Italy	0	1	1	10	22
11	Kazushige Kuboki	Japan	0	1	1	12	20
12	Yanne Dorenbos	Netherlands	0	0	0	2	18
13	Adam Křenek	Czechia	0	0	0	5	16
14	Oscar Nilsson-Julien	France	0	0	0	6	14
15	Conor Leahy	Australia	0	0	0	7	12
16	Clever Martínez	Venezuela	0	0	0	8	10
17	Alisher Zhumakan	Kazakhstan	0	0	0	19	8
18	Wu Junjie	China	−20	1	−19	22	6
19	Ramazan Yılmaz	Turkey	−20	0	−20	4	4
20	Alex Vogel	Switzerland	−20	0	−20	11	2
21	Ricardo Peña	Mexico	−20	0	−20	13	1
22	Ilya Savekin	Individual Neutral Athletes	−20	0	−20	23	1
23	Tomás Moyano	Argentina	−40	0	−40	20	1
—	Grant Koontz	United States	Did not start				

=== Elimination race ===
The elimination race was started at 14:51.

Rank	Name	Nation	Event points
1	Henry Hobbs	Great Britain	40
2	Tim Torn Teutenberg	Germany	38
3	Iúri Leitão	Portugal	36
4	Fabio Van Den Bossche	Belgium	34
5	Simone Consonni	Italy	32
6	Yanne Dorenbos	Netherlands	30
7	Tim Wafler	Austria	28
8	Adam Křenek	Czechia	26
9	Sebastián Mora	Spain	24
10	Daniel Staniszewski	Poland	22
11	Tobias Hansen	Denmark	20
12	Wu Junjie	China	18
13	Clever Martínez	Venezuela	16
14	Kazushige Kuboki	Japan	14
15	Oscar Nilsson-Julien	France	12
16	Ilya Savekin	Individual Neutral Athletes	10
17	Alex Vogel	Switzerland	8
18	Keegan Hornblow	New Zealand	6
19	Conor Leahy	Australia	4
20	Ramazan Yılmaz	Turkey	2
21	Tomás Moyano	Argentina	1
22	Alisher Zhumakan	Kazakhstan	1
23	Ricardo Peña	Mexico	1
—	Grant Koontz	United States	

=== Points race and overall standings ===
The points race was started at 20:23.

Rank	Name	Nation	SR	TR	ER	Subtotal	Points race			Total points
Rank	Name	Nation	SR	TR	ER	Subtotal	Lap points	Sprint points	Finish order	Total points
1st place, gold medalist(s)	Iúri Leitão	Portugal	40	36	36	112	20	11	14	143
2nd place, silver medalist(s)	Fabio Van Den Bossche	Belgium	32	32	34	98	20	11	17	129
3rd place, bronze medalist(s)	Tim Torn Teutenberg	Germany	28	40	38	106	0	9	12	115
4	Sebastián Mora	Spain	24	38	24	86	20	7	16	113
5	Simone Consonni	Italy	22	22	32	76	20	9	19	105
6	Henry Hobbs	Great Britain	26	34	40	100	0	2	8	102
7	Tobias Hansen	Denmark	34	26	20	80	0	13	1	93
8	Oscar Nilsson-Julien	France	30	14	12	56	20	15	3	91
9	Yanne Dorenbos	Netherlands	2	18	30	50	20	17	6	87
10	Adam Křenek	Czechia	36	16	26	78	0	5	18	83
11	Kazushige Kuboki	Japan	38	20	14	72	0	2	4	74
12	Daniel Staniszewski	Poland	20	24	22	66	0	6	2	72
13	Tim Wafler	Austria	10	28	28	66	0	4	13	70
14	Keegan Hornblow	New Zealand	18	30	4	52	0	2	9	54
15	Conor Leahy	Australia	6	12	2	20	20	3	7	43
16	Clever Martínez	Venezuela	14	10	16	40	0	0	21	40
17	Wu Junjie	China	8	6	18	32	0	4	11	36
18	Ramazan Yılmaz	Turkey	1	4	6	11	20	0	10	31
19	Alex Vogel	Switzerland	12	2	8	22	0	0	5	22
20	Alisher Zhumakan	Kazakhstan	1	8	1	10	0	0	15	10
21	Ilya Savekin	Individual Neutral Athletes	16	1	10	27	−20	0	20	7
22	Ricardo Peña	Mexico	4	1	1	6	−40	1	–	DNF
22	Tomás Moyano	Argentina	1	−39	1	−37	−40	0	–	DNF
	Grant Koontz	United States	1	Did not start						
