= 2026 UEC European Track Championships – Men's elimination race =

Men's elimination race at the 2026 UEC Track Elite European Championships
- Venue: Konya Velodrome, Konya
- Date: 1 February
- Competitors: 26

Medalists
gold medal	Tobias Hansen	Denmark
silver medal	Tim Torn Teutenberg	Germany
bronze medal	Jules Hesters	Belgium

The men's elimination race competition at the 2026 UEC European Track Championships was held on 1 February 2026.

== Results ==
=== Qualifying ===
==== Heat 1 ====
Rank	Name	Nation	Notes
1	Bor Ebner	Slovenia	Q
2	Tobias Hansen	Denmark	Q
3	Mats Poot	Switzerland	Q
4	Davide Boscaro	Italy	Q
5	Jules Hesters	Belgium	Q
6	Carlos Salgueiro	Portugal	Q
7	Matti Dobbins	Ireland	Q
8	Oleh Smolynets	Ukraine	Q
9	Ilya Savekin	Individual Neutral Athletes	Q
10	Gustav Johansson	Sweden	Q
11	Bertold Drijver	Hungary	Q
12	Eduard Grosu	Romania	
13	Lenn Schmitz	Luxembourg	

==== Heat 2 ====
Rank	Name	Nation	Notes
1	Tim Torn Teutenberg	Germany	Q
2	Ramazan Yılmaz	Turkey	Q
3	Kiryl Hutsko	Individual Neutral Athletes	Q
4	Nikolaos Manthos	Greece	Q
5	Yanne Dorenbos	Netherlands	Q
6	William Tidball	Great Britain	Q
7	Donavan Grondin	France	Q
8	Franz-Josef Lässer	Austria	Q
9	Adam Křenek	Czech Republic	Q
10	Alan Banaszek	Poland	Q
11	Sebastián Mora	Spain	Q
12	Vitālijs Korņilovs	Latvia	
13	Martin Hajduch	Slovakia	

=== Final ===
The race was started at 19:45.

Rank	Name	Nation
1st place, gold medalist(s)	Tobias Hansen	Denmark
2nd place, silver medalist(s)	Tim Torn Teutenberg	Germany
3rd place, bronze medalist(s)	Jules Hesters	Belgium
4	Yanne Dorenbos	Netherlands
5	Davide Boscaro	Italy
6	William Tidball	Great Britain
7	Adam Křenek	Czech Republic
8	Donavan Grondin	France
9	Mats Poot	Switzerland
10	Ramazan Yılmaz	Turkey
11	Carlos Salgueiro	Portugal
12	Bertold Drijver	Hungary
13	Matti Dobbins	Ireland
14	Bor Ebner	Slovenia
15	Ilya Savekin	Individual Neutral Athletes
16	Franz-Josef Lässer	Austria
17	Oleh Smolynets	Ukraine
18	Alan Banaszek	Poland
19	Kiryl Hutsko	Individual Neutral Athletes
20	Sebastián Mora	Spain
21	Nikolaos Manthos	Greece
22	Gustav Johansson	Sweden
