= 2026 UEC European Track Championships – Men's scratch =

Men's scratch at the 2026 UEC Track Elite European Championships
- Venue: Konya Velodrome, Konya
- Date: 3 February
- Competitors: 26

Medalists
gold medal	Alex Vogel	Switzerland
silver medal	Ilya Savekin
bronze medal	Vincent Hoppezak	Netherlands

The men's scratch competition at the 2026 UEC European Track Championships was held on 3 February 2026.

== Results ==
=== Qualifying ===
==== Heat 1 ====
Rank	Name	Nation	Notes
1	Alex Vogel	Switzerland	Q
2	Nejc Peterlin	Slovenia	Q
3	William Tidball	Great Britain	Q
4	Tobias Hansen	Denmark	Q
5	Maximilian Fitzgerald	Ireland	Q
6	Donavan Grondin	France	Q
7	Noah Vandenbranden	Belgium	Q
8	Diogo Narciso	Portugal	Q
9	Ilya Savekin	Individual Neutral Athletes	Q
10	Bertold Drijver	Hungary	Q
11	Oleh Smolynets	Ukraine	Q
12	Gustav Johansson	Sweden	
	Vitālijs Korņilovs	Latvia	ABD

==== Heat 2 ====
Rank	Name	Nation	Notes
1	Álvaro Navas	Spain	Q
2	Vincent Hoppezak	Netherlands	Q
3	Franz-Josef Lässer	Austria	Q
4	Francesco Lamon	Italy	Q
5	Max-David Briese	Germany	Q
6	Filip Prokopyszyn	Poland	Q
7	Dzianis Mazur	Individual Neutral Athletes	Q
8	Eduard Grosu	Romania	Q
9	Matyáš Koblížek	Czech Republic	Q
10	Ramazan Yılmaz	Turkey	Q
11	Nikolaos Manthos	Greece	Q
12	Lenn Schmitz	Luxembourg	
	Tadeáš Cesnek	Slovakia	DNF

=== Final ===
Rank	Name	Nation	Laps down
1st place, gold medalist(s)	Alex Vogel	Switzerland	
2nd place, silver medalist(s)	Ilya Savekin	Individual Neutral Athletes	
3rd place, bronze medalist(s)	Vincent Hoppezak	Netherlands	−1
4	Tobias Hansen	Denmark	−1
5	Max-David Briese	Germany	−1
6	Donavan Grondin	France	−1
7	Francesco Lamon	Italy	−1
8	Franz-Josef Lässer	Austria	−1
9	Bertold Drijver	Hungary	−1
10	Álvaro Navas	Spain	−1
11	Nikolaos Manthos	Greece	−1
12	Nejc Peterlin	Slovenia	−1
13	Noah Vandenbranden	Belgium	−1
14	Matyáš Koblížek	Czech Republic	−1
15	Filip Prokopyszyn	Poland	−1
16	Ramazan Yılmaz	Turkey	−1
17	Dzianis Mazur	Individual Neutral Athletes	−1
18	William Tidball	Great Britain	−1
19	Diogo Narciso	Portugal	−1
20	Maximilian Fitzgerald	Ireland	DNF
20	Eduard Grosu	Romania	DNF
20	Oleh Smolynets	Ukraine	DNF
