= 2026 UCI Track Cycling World Championships – Men's elimination =

Men's elimination at the 2026 UCI Track Cycling World Championships
- Venue: Shanghai Velodrome
- Location: Shanghai, China
- Dates: 18 October
- Competitors: 24 from 24 nations

Medalists
gold medal	Tim Torn Teutenberg	Germany
silver medal	Tobias Hansen	Denmark
bronze medal	Jules Hesters	Belgium

The Men's elimination competition at the 2026 UCI Track Cycling World Championships was held on 18 October 2026.

== Results ==
The race was started at 14:45.

Rank	Name	Nation
1st place, gold medalist(s)	Tim Torn Teutenberg	Germany
2nd place, silver medalist(s)	Tobias Hansen	Denmark
3rd place, bronze medalist(s)	Jules Hesters	Belgium
4	Ashlin Barry	United States
5	Adam Křenek	Czechia
6	Blake Agnoletto	Australia
7	Tom Sexton	New Zealand
8	Diogo Narciso	Portugal
9	Eiya Hashimoto	Japan
10	Ramazan Yılmaz	Turkey
11	Tim Wafler	Austria
12	Filip Prokopyszyn	Poland
13	Ricardo Peña	Mexico
14	Alex Vogel	Switzerland
15	Matteo Fiorin	Italy
16	Xavier Cañellas	Spain
17	Noah Hobbs	Great Britain
18	Red Walters	Grenada
19	Clever Martínez	Venezuela
20	Wu Junjie	China
21	Alisher Zhumakan	Kazakhstan
22	Gleb Syritsa	Individual Neutral Athletes
23	Valentin Tabellion	France
24	Vincent Hoppezak	Netherlands
