= 2025 UEC European Track Championships – Men's madison =

Men's madison at the 2025 UEC European Track Championships
- Venue: Velodroom Limburg, Heusden-Zolder
- Date: 16 February
- Competitors: 36 from 18 nations
- Teams: 18
- Winning points: 119

Medalists
| gold medal | Yanne Dorenbos; Vincent Hoppezak | Netherlands |
| silver medal | Roger Kluge; Tim Torn Teutenberg | Germany |
| bronze medal | Ivo Oliveira; Rui Oliveira | Portugal |

The men's madison competition at the 2025 UEC European Track Championships was held on 16 February 2025.

== Results ==
200 laps (50 km) with 20 sprints were raced.

| Rank | Name | Nation | Lap points | Sprint points | Finish order | Total points |
|---|---|---|---|---|---|---|
| 1st place, gold medalist(s) | Yanne Dorenbos; Vincent Hoppezak | Netherlands | 80 | 39 | 6 | 119 |
| 2nd place, silver medalist(s) | Roger Kluge; Tim Torn Teutenberg | Germany | 60 | 45 | 14 | 105 |
| 3rd place, bronze medalist(s) | Ivo Oliveira; Rui Oliveira | Portugal | 60 | 36 | 4 | 96 |
| 4 | Tobias Hansen; Niklas Larsen | Denmark | 60 | 15 | 9 | 75 |
| 5 | William Perrett; Matthew Walls | Great Britain | 60 | 14 | 7 | 74 |
| 6 | Lindsay De Vylder; Noah Vandenbranden | Belgium | 40 | 32 | 3 | 72 |
| 7 | Erwan Besnier; Clément Petit | France | 20 | 13 | 2 | 33 |
| 8 | Filip Prokopyszyn; Wojciech Pszczolarski | Poland | 0 | 5 | 11 | 5 |
| 9 | Maximilian Schmidbauer; Tim Wafler | Austria | –20 | 14 | 1 | –6 |
| 10 | Davide Stella; Juan David Sierra | Italy | –20 | 10 | 5 | –10 |
| 11 | Álvaro Navas; Joan Roca | Spain | –20 | 3 | 8 | –17 |
| 12 | Matyáš Koblížek; Adam Křenek | Czech Republic | –20 | 0 | 13 | –20 |
| 13 | Matteo Constant; Pascal Tappeiner | Switzerland | –40 | 5 | 12 | –35 |
| 14 | Heorhii Chyzhykov; Daniil Yakovlev | Ukraine | –60 | 0 | 10 | –60 |
| 15 | Martin Jurík; Pavol Rovder | Slovakia | –40 | 0 | – | DNF |
| 16 | Vladyslav Loginov; Alon Yogev | Israel | –40 | 0 | – | DNF |
| | Žak Eržen; Nejc Peterlin | Slovenia | –20 | 0 | – | DNF |
| | Mustafa Tarakçı; Ramazan Yılmaz | Turkey | –20 | 0 | – | DNF |
