= 2026 UEC European Track Championships – Men's omnium =

Men's omnium at the 2026 UEC European Track Championships
- Venue: Konya Velodrome, Konya
- Date: 4 February
- Competitors: 25
- Winning points: 140

Medalists
gold medal	Iúri Leitão	Portugal
silver medal	Yanne Dorenbos	Netherlands
bronze medal	Roger Kluge	Germany

The men's omnium competition at the 2026 UEC European Track Championships was held on 4 February 2026.

== Results ==
=== Qualifying ===
==== Heat 1 ====
Rank	Name	Nation	Points	Notes
1	Alex Vogel	Switzerland	25	Q
2	Simone Consonni	Italy	25	Q
3	Dzianis Mazur	Individual Neutral Athletes	23	Q
4	Maximilian Schmidbauer	Austria	20	Q
5	Matti Dobbins	Ireland	20	Q
6	Nejc Peterlin	Slovenia	14	Q
7	Bertold Drijver	Hungary	12	Q
8	Ramazan Yılmaz	Turkey	12	Q
9	Nikolaos Manthos	Greece	11	Q
10	Henry Hobbs	Great Britain	10	Q
11	Daniel Staniszewski	Poland	5	
12	Martin Hajduch	Slovakia	−60	

==== Heat 2 ====
Rank	Name	Nation	Points	Notes
1	Oscar Nilsson-Julien	France	28	Q
2	Iúri Leitão	Portugal	27	Q
3	Milan Van den Haute	Belgium	25	Q
4	Sebastián Mora	Spain	24	Q
5	Yanne Dorenbos	Netherlands	23	Q
6	Roger Kluge	Germany	22	Q
7	Adam Křenek	Czechia	21	Q
8	Rasmus Pedersen	Denmark	18	Q
9	Heorhii Chyzhykov	Ukraine	9	Q
10	Gustav Johansson	Sweden	8	Q
11	Ilya Savekin	Individual Neutral Athletes	8	Q
12	Charel Meyers	Luxembourg	4	
13	Alin Toader	Romania	−20	

=== Final ===
Rank	Name	Nation	SR	TR	ER	Subtotal	Points race			Total points
Rank	Name	Nation	SR	TR	ER	Subtotal	Lap points	Sprint points	Finish order	Total points
1st place, gold medalist(s)	Iúri Leitão	Portugal	40	40	12	92	20	28	14	140
2nd place, silver medalist(s)	Yanne Dorenbos	Netherlands	36	28	38	102	20	9	12	131
3rd place, bronze medalist(s)	Roger Kluge	Germany	38	30	24	92	20	14	15	126
4	Henry Hobbs	Great Britain	30	22	40	92	20	6	16	118
5	Milan Van den Haute	Belgium	32	20	14	66	40	2	18	108
6	Ilya Savekin	Individual Neutral Athletes	34	26	32	92	0	11	2	103
7	Alex Vogel	Switzerland	22	16	34	72	20	7	17	99
8	Rasmus Pedersen	Denmark	28	32	28	88	0	7	6	95
9	Oscar Nilsson-Julien	France	20	36	16	72	0	17	1	89
10	Simone Consonni	Italy	26	24	36	86	0	0	5	86
11	Matti Dobbins	Ireland	18	14	26	58	20	7	3	85
12	Nejc Peterlin	Slovenia	8	38	4	50	20	4	4	74
13	Ramazan Yılmaz	Turkey	6	6	30	42	20	4	8	66
14	Adam Křenek	Czechia	24	34	8	66	0	0	19	66
15	Maximilian Schmidbauer	Austria	16	12	20	48	0	5	21	53
16	Sebastián Mora	Spain	10	18	18	46	0	0	9	46
17	Heorhii Chyzhykov	Ukraine	14	8	22	44	0	0	7	44
18	Bertold Drijver	Hungary	2	10	2	14	0	0	10	14
19	Dzianis Mazur	Individual Neutral Athletes	12	4	6	22	−20	0	11	2
20	Nikolaos Manthos	Greece	4	1	1	6	−20	0	13	−14
21	Gustav Johansson	Sweden	−39	2	10	−27	−20	0	20	−47
