= 2025 UEC European Track Championships – Men's points race =

Men's points race at the 2025 UEC European Track Championships
- Venue: Velodroom Limburg, Heusden-Zolder
- Date: 13 February
- Competitors: 23 from 23 nations
- Winning points: 157

Medalists
gold medal	Iúri Leitão	Portugal
silver medal	Yanne Dorenbos	Netherlands
bronze medal	Jasper De Buyst	Belgium

The men's points race competition at the 2025 UEC European Track Championships was held on 13 February 2025.

== Results ==
160 laps (40 km) were raced with 16 sprints.

Rank	Name	Nation	Lap points	Sprint points	Finish order	Total points
1st place, gold medalist(s)	Iúri Leitão	Portugal	100	57	2	157
2nd place, silver medalist(s)	Yanne Dorenbos	Netherlands	100	14	3	114
3rd place, bronze medalist(s)	Jasper De Buyst	Belgium	80	26	7	106
4	Clément Petit	France	80	23	10	103
5	Matyáš Koblížek	Czech Republic	80	6	14	86
6	Wojciech Pszczolarski	Poland	40	7	4	47
7	Roger Kluge	Germany	40	7	20	47
8	Lukas Rüegg	Switzerland	40	6	6	46
9	Juan David Sierra	Italy	20	18	1	38
10	Nejc Peterlin	Slovenia	20	5	13	25
11	Ilya Savekin	Individual Neutral Athletes 2	20	3	8	23
12	Alon Yogev	Israel	20	2	19	22
13	Matt Walls	Great Britain	0	6	5	6
14	Bertold Drijver	Hungary	0	3	17	3
15	Raphael Kokas	Austria	0	1	15	1
16	Joan Roca	Spain	0	0	11	0
17	Martin Chren	Slovakia	0	0	18	0
18	Daniel Crista	Romania	–20	3	21	–17
19	Conrad Haugsted	Denmark	–20	0	9	–20
20	Heorhii Chyzhykov	Ukraine	–20	0	12	–20
21	Gustav Johansson	Sweden	–20	0	16	–20
22	Mustafa Tarakçı	Turkey	–40	0	–	DNF
23	Nikolas Klimavičius	Lithuania	–40	0	–	DNF
