= 2023 UCI Track Cycling World Championships – Men's scratch =

Men's scratch at the 2023 UCI Track Cycling World Championships
- Venue: Sir Chris Hoy Velodrome
- Location: Glasgow, United Kingdom
- Dates: 3 August
- Competitors: 23 from 23 nations

Medalists
gold medal	William Tidball	Great Britain
silver medal	Kazushige Kuboki	Japan
bronze medal	Tuur Dens	Belgium

The Men's scratch competition at the 2023 UCI Track Cycling World Championships was held on 3 August 2023.

== Results ==
The race was started at 20:27. First rider across the line without a net lap loss won.

Rank	Name	Nation	Laps down
1st place, gold medalist(s)	William Tidball	Great Britain	
2nd place, silver medalist(s)	Kazushige Kuboki	Japan	
3rd place, bronze medalist(s)	Tuur Dens	Belgium	
4	Roy Eefting	Netherlands	
5	Donavan Grondin	France	
6	Dylan Bibic	Canada	
7	Tobias Hansen	Denmark	
8	Tim Torn Teutenberg	Germany	
9	Josh Duffy	Australia	
10	Alex Vogel	Switzerland	
11	George Jackson	New Zealand	
12	Raphael Kokas	Austria	
13	Jan Voneš	Czech Republic	
14	Michele Scartezzini	Italy	
15	Albert Torres	Spain	
16	Artyom Zakharov	Kazakhstan	
17	Terry Kusuma	Indonesia	
–	Akil Campbell	Trinidad and Tobago	Did not finish
–	Ahmed Al-Mansoori	United Arab Emirates	Did not finish
–	Yacine Chalel	Algeria	Did not finish
–	Vladyslav Loginov	Israel	Did not finish
–	Filip Prokopyszyn	Poland	Did not finish
–	Martin Chren	Slovakia	Did not finish
–	Grant Koontz	United States	Did not finish
