= 2023 UEC European Track Championships – Men's elimination race =

Men's elimination race at the 2023 UEC European Track Championships
- Venue: Tissot Velodrome, Grenchen
- Date: 8 February
- Competitors: 20 from 20 nations

Medalists
gold medal	Tim Torn Teutenberg	Germany
silver medal	Rui Oliveira	Portugal
bronze medal	Philip Heijnen	Netherlands

The men's elimination race competition at the 2023 UEC European Track Championships was held on 8 February 2023.

== Results ==
Rank	Name	Nation
1st place, gold medalist(s)	Tim Torn Teutenberg	Germany
2nd place, silver medalist(s)	Rui Oliveira	Portugal
3rd place, bronze medalist(s)	Philip Heijnen	Netherlands
4	Donavan Grondin	France
5	Elia Viviani	Italy
6	Jules Hesters	Belgium
7	Tobias Hansen	Denmark
8	Denis Rugovac	Czech Republic
9	Christos Volikakis	Greece
10	Erik Martorell	Spain
11	Valentyn Kabashnyi	Ukraine
12	Raphael Kokas	Austria
13	Rotem Tene	Israel
14	Fred Wright	Great Britain
15	Pavol Rovder	Slovakia
16	Žygimantas Matuzevičius	Lithuania
17	Filip Prokopyszyn	Poland
18	Dominik Bieler	Switzerland
19	Georgijs Nemilostivijs	Latvia
20	Musa Mikayilzade	Azerbaijan
