= 2024 UCI Track Cycling World Championships – Men's elimination =

Men's elimination at the 2024 UCI Track Cycling World Championships
- Venue: Ballerup Super Arena
- Location: Ballerup, Denmark
- Dates: 20 October
- Competitors: 23 from 23 nations

Medalists
| gold medal | Tobias Hansen | Denmark |
| silver medal | Elia Viviani | Italy |
| bronze medal | Dylan Bibic | Canada |

The Men's elimination competition at the 2024 UCI Track Cycling World Championships was held on 20 October 2024.

== Results ==
The race was started at 14:42.

| Rank | Name | Nation |
|---|---|---|
| 1st place, gold medalist(s) | Tobias Hansen | Denmark |
| 2nd place, silver medalist(s) | Elia Viviani | Italy |
| 3rd place, bronze medalist(s) | Dylan Bibic | Canada |
| 4 | Diogo Narciso | Portugal |
| 5 | Mario Anguela | Spain |
| 6 | Noah Hobbs | Great Britain |
| 7 | Adam Křenek | Czech Republic |
| 8 | Jordan Parra | Colombia |
| 9 | Tim Wafler | Austria |
| 10 | Adam Wożniak | Poland |
| 11 | Nicolò De Lisi | Switzerland |
| 12 | Akil Campbell | Trinidad and Tobago |
| 13 | Blake Agnoletto | Australia |
| 14 | Ramis Dinmukhametov | Kazakhstan |
| 15 | Naoki Kojima | Japan |
| 16 | Edibaldo Maldonado | Mexico |
| 17 | Jules Hesters | Belgium |
| 18 | Grant Koontz | United States |
| 19 | Benjamin Boos | Germany |
| 20 | Terry Kusuma | Indonesia |
| 21 | Harshveer Sekhon | India |
| 22 | Pavol Rovder | Slovakia |
| DSQ | Jan-Willem van Schip | Netherlands |
