= 2023 UCI Track Cycling World Championships – Men's omnium =

Men's omnium at the 2023 UCI Track Cycling World Championships
- Venue: Sir Chris Hoy Velodrome
- Location: Glasgow, United Kingdom
- Dates: 6 August
- Competitors: 24 from 24 nations
- Winning points: 187

Medalists
gold medal	Iúri Leitão	Portugal
silver medal	Benjamin Thomas	France
bronze medal	Shunsuke Imamura	Japan

The Men's omnium competition at the 2023 UCI Track Cycling World Championships was held on 6 August 2023.

== Results ==
=== Scratch race ===
The scratch race was started at 14:28.

Rank	Name	Nation	Laps down	Event points
1	Iúri Leitão	Portugal		40
2	Oliver Wood	Great Britain		38
3	Tim Torn Teutenberg	Germany		36
4	Vincent Hoppezak	Netherlands		34
5	Dylan Bibic	Canada		32
6	Niklas Larsen	Denmark		30
7	Campbell Stewart	New Zealand		28
8	Shunsuke Imamura	Japan		26
9	Sebastián Mora	Spain		24
10	Elia Viviani	Italy		22
11	Kelland O'Brien	Australia		20
12	Tim Wafler	Austria		18
13	Daniel Crista	Romania		16
14	Alan Banaszek	Poland		14
15	Artyom Zakharov	Kazakhstan		12
16	Benjamin Thomas	France		10
17	Gavin Hoover	United States		8
18	Fabio Van Den Bossche	Belgium		6
19	Valère Thiébaud	Switzerland		4
20	Ricardo Peña	Mexico	−1	2
21	Leung Ka Yu	Hong Kong	Did not finish	−39
21	Bernard Van Aert	Indonesia	Did not finish	−39
21	Ahmed Al-Mansoori	United Arab Emirates	Did not finish	−39
21	Akil Campbell	Trinidad and Tobago	Did not finish	−39

=== Tempo race ===
The scratch race was started at 18:22.

Rank	Name	Nation	Lap points	Sprint points	Total points	Event points
1	Iúri Leitão	Portugal	20	12	32	40
2	Shunsuke Imamura	Japan	0	8	9	38
3	Sebastián Mora	Spain	0	8	8	36
4	Niklas Larsen	Denmark	0	6	6	34
5	Benjamin Thomas	France	0	1	1	32
6	Fabio Van Den Bossche	Belgium	0	0	0	30
7	Dylan Bibic	Canada	0	0	0	28
8	Vincent Hoppezak	Netherlands	0	0	0	26
9	Elia Viviani	Italy	0	0	0	24
10	Alan Banaszek	Poland	0	0	0	22
11	Oliver Wood	Great Britain	0	0	0	20
12	Tim Torn Teutenberg	Germany	0	0	0	18
13	Tim Wafler	Austria	0	0	0	16
14	Campbell Stewart	New Zealand	0	0	0	14
15	Valère Thiébaud	Switzerland	0	0	0	12
16	Gavin Hoover	United States	0	0	0	10
17	Ricardo Peña	Mexico	0	0	0	8
18	Daniel Crista	Romania	0	0	0	6
19	Ahmed Al-Mansoori	United Arab Emirates	0	0	0	4
20	Akil Campbell	Trinidad and Tobago	0	0	0	2
21	Kelland O'Brien	Australia	0	0	0	1
22	Artyom Zakharov	Kazakhstan	0	0	0	1
23	Leung Ka Yu	Hong Kong	−20	0	−20	1
24	Bernard Van Aert	Indonesia	−20	0	−20	1

=== Elimination race ===
The elimination race was started at 19:16.

Rank	Name	Nation	Event points
1	Campbell Stewart	New Zealand	40
2	Iúri Leitão	Portugal	38
3	Kelland O'Brien	Australia	36
4	Dylan Bibic	Canada	34
5	Vincent Hoppezak	Netherlands	32
6	Sebastián Mora	Spain	30
7	Tim Torn Teutenberg	Germany	28
8	Oliver Wood	Great Britain	26
9	Benjamin Thomas	France	24
10	Elia Viviani	Italy	22
11	Shunsuke Imamura	Japan	20
12	Tim Wafler	Austria	18
13	Fabio Van Den Bossche	Belgium	16
14	Artyom Zakharov	Kazakhstan	14
15	Akil Campbell	Trinidad and Tobago	12
16	Bernard Van Aert	Indonesia	10
17	Gavin Hoover	United States	8
18	Valère Thiébaud	Switzerland	6
19	Ricardo Peña	Mexico	4
20	Daniel Crista	Romania	2
21	Ahmed Al-Mansoori	United Arab Emirates	1
22	Niklas Larsen	Denmark	1
23	Leung Ka Yu	Hong Kong	1
24	Alan Banaszek	Poland	1

=== Points race and overall standings ===
The points race was started at 20:12.

Rank	Name	Nation	Lap points	Sprint points	Total points
1st place, gold medalist(s)	Iúri Leitão	Portugal	60	9	187
2nd place, silver medalist(s)	Benjamin Thomas	France	80	25	185
3rd place, bronze medalist(s)	Shunsuke Imamura	Japan	80	11	175
4	Niklas Larsen	Denmark	80	25	170
5	Vincent Hoppezak	Netherlands	60	8	160
6	Elia Viviani	Italy	80	12	158
7	Fabio Van Den Bossche	Belgium	100	2	156
8	Sebastián Mora	Spain	60	7	155
9	Oliver Wood	Great Britain	60	0	144
10	Tim Torn Teutenberg	Germany	40	6	128
11	Campbell Stewart	New Zealand	40	3	125
12	Alan Banaszek	Poland	80	3	118
13	Dylan Bibic	Canada	20	1	115
14	Tim Wafler	Austria	40	3	93
15	Kelland O'Brien	Australia	20	0	75
16	Gavin Hoover	United States	40	5	71
17	Valère Thiébaud	Switzerland	20	1	47
18	Daniel Crista	Romania	20	0	42
19	Artyom Zakharov	Kazakhstan	0	0	25
20	Ricardo Peña	Mexico	0	0	14
22	Akil Campbell	Trinidad and Tobago	0	0	−25
21	Bernard Van Aert	Indonesia	0	0	−28
–	Leung Ka Yu	Hong Kong	Did not finish		
–	Ahmed Al-Mansoori	United Arab Emirates	Did not finish		
