= 2021 UCI Track Cycling World Championships – Men's elimination =

Track Cycling World Championship

Men's elimination at the 2021 UCI Track Cycling World Championships
- Venue: Vélodrome Couvert Régional Jean Stablinski
- Location: Roubaix, France
- Dates: 24 October
- Competitors: 21 from 21 nations

Medalists
gold medal	Elia Viviani	Italy
silver medal	Iúri Leitão	Portugal
bronze medal	Sergey Rostovtsev

The Men's elimination competition at the 2021 UCI Track Cycling World Championships was held on 24 October 2021.

== Results ==
The race was started at 16:39.

Rank	Name	Nation
1st place, gold medalist(s)	Elia Viviani	Italy
2nd place, silver medalist(s)	Iúri Leitão	Portugal
3rd place, bronze medalist(s)	Sergey Rostovtsev	Russian Cycling Federation
4	Donavan Grondin	France
5	Jules Hesters	Belgium
6	Ethan Vernon	Great Britain
7	Erik Martorell	Spain
8	Gavin Hoover	United States
9	Rotem Tene	Israel
10	Yacine Chalel	Algeria
11	Jan Voneš	Czech Republic
12	Tobias Hansen	Denmark
13	Roman Gladysh	Ukraine
14	Jordan Parra	Colombia
15	Yauheni Karaliok	Belarus
16	Theo Reinhardt	Germany
17	Akil Campbell	Trinidad and Tobago
18	Eiya Hashimoto	Japan
19	José Muñiz	Mexico
20	Facundo Lezica	Argentina
21	Maximilian Schmidbauer	Austria
22	Claudio Imhof	Switzerland
