= 2025 UCI Track Cycling World Championships – Men's scratch =

Men's scratch at the 2025 UCI Track Cycling World Championships
- Venue: Velódromo Peñalolén
- Location: Santiago, Chile
- Dates: 23 October
- Competitors: 24 from 24 nations

Medalists
| gold medal | Moritz Augenstein | Germany |
| silver medal | Yanne Dorenbos | Netherlands |
| bronze medal | Iúri Leitão | Portugal |

The Men's scratch competition at the 2025 UCI Track Cycling World Championships was held on 23 October 2025.

== Results ==
The race was started at 19:55. First rider across the line without a net lap loss won.

| Rank | Name | Nation | Laps down |
|---|---|---|---|
| 1st place, gold medalist(s) | Moritz Augenstein | Germany | |
| 2nd place, silver medalist(s) | Yanne Dorenbos | Netherlands | |
| 3rd place, bronze medalist(s) | Iúri Leitão | Portugal | |
| 4 | Bertold Drijver | Hungary | |
| 5 | Campbell Stewart | New Zealand | |
| 6 | Jules Hesters | Belgium | |
| 7 | Grant Koontz | United States | |
| 8 | Tetsuo Yamamoto | Japan | |
| 9 | Mathieu Dupé | France | |
| 10 | Jan Voneš | Czech Republic | |
| 11 | Dylan Bibic | Canada | |
| 12 | Liam Walsh | Australia | |
| 13 | Tim Wafler | Austria | |
| 14 | Clever Martínez | Venezuela | |
| 15 | Mark Stewart | Great Britain | |
| 16 | Jacob Decar | Chile | |
| 17 | Mats Poot | Switzerland | −1 |
| 18 | Tobias Hansen | Denmark | −1 |
| 19 | Davide Stella | Italy | −1 |
| 20 | Fernando Nava | Mexico | −1 |
| 21 | Beñat Garaiar | Spain | −1 |
| 22 | Ramis Dinmukhametov | Kazakhstan | −1 |
| 23 | Filip Prokopyszyn | Poland | −1 |
| 24 | Martin Chren | Slovakia | −2 |
