= 2024 UEC European Track Championships – Men's elimination race =

Men's elimination race at the 2024 UEC European Track Championships
- Venue: Omnisport Apeldoorn, Apeldoorn
- Date: 10 January
- Competitors: 17 from 17 nations

Medalists
gold medal	Tobias Hansen	Denmark
silver medal	William Tidball	Great Britain
bronze medal	Jules Hesters	Belgium

The men's elimination race competition at the 2024 UEC European Track Championships was held on 10 January 2024.

== Results ==
Rank	Name	Nation
1st place, gold medalist(s)	Tobias Hansen	Denmark
2nd place, silver medalist(s)	William Tidball	Great Britain
3rd place, bronze medalist(s)	Jules Hesters	Belgium
4	Tim Wafler	Austria
5	Donavan Grondin	France
6	Tim Torn Teutenberg	Germany
7	Philip Heijnen	Netherlands
8	Alex Vogel	Switzerland
9	Diogo Narciso	Portugal
10	Jan Voneš	Czech Republic
11	Michele Scartezzini	Italy
12	Amit Keinan	Israel
13	Pavol Rovder	Slovakia
14	George Nemilostivijs	Latvia
15	Erik Martorell	Spain
16	Adam Woźniak	Poland
17	Roman Gladysh	Ukraine
