= 2025 UEC European Track Championships – Men's scratch =

Men's scratch at the 2025 UEC European Track Championships
- Venue: Velodroom Limburg, Heusden-Zolder
- Date: 14 February
- Competitors: 24 from 24 nations

Medalists
gold medal	Iúri Leitão	Portugal
silver medal	Vincent Hoppezak	Netherlands
bronze medal	William Tidball	Great Britain

The men's scratch competition at the 2025 UEC European Track Championships was held on 14 February 2025.

== Results ==
First rider across the line without a net lap loss wins.

Rank	Name	Nation	Laps down
1st place, gold medalist(s)	Iúri Leitão	Portugal	
2nd place, silver medalist(s)	Vincent Hoppezak	Netherlands	
3rd place, bronze medalist(s)	William Tidball	Great Britain	–1
4	Filip Prokopyszyn	Poland	–1
5	Bruno Keßler	Germany	–1
6	Martin Chren	Slovakia	–1
7	Bertold Drijver	Hungary	–1
8	Tim Wafler	Austria	–1
9	Karsten Larsen Feldmann	Norway	–1
10	Álvaro Navas	Spain	–1
11	Mats Poot	Switzerland	–1
12	Jan Voneš	Czech Republic	–1
13	Davide Stella	Italy	–1
14	Ramazan Yılmaz	Turkey	–1
15	Vladyslav Loginov	Israel	–1
16	Lucas Menanteau	France	–1
17	Tobias Hansen	Denmark	–1
18	Daniel Crista	Romania	–1
19	Vitaliy Hryniv	Ukraine	–1
20	Gustav Johansson	Sweden	–1
21	Vid Murn	Slovenia	–1
22	Grigorii Skorniakov	Individual Neutral Athletes	–1
23	Nikolas Klimavičius	Lithuania	–1
24	Tuur Dens	Belgium	–1
