= 2026 UEC European Track Championships – Men's points race =

Men's points race at the 2026 UEC Track Elite European Championships
- Venue: Konya Velodrome, Konya
- Date: 2 February
- Competitors: 23
- Winning points: 106

Medalists
gold medal	Tim Torn Teutenberg	Germany
silver medal	Conrad Haugsted	Denmark
bronze medal	Jasper De Buyst	Belgium

The men's points race competition at the 2026 UEC European Track Championships was held on 2 February 2026.

== Results ==
160 laps (40 km) were raced with 16 sprints.

Rank	Name	Nation	Lap points	Sprint points	Finish order	Total points
1st place, gold medalist(s)	Tim Torn Teutenberg	Germany	80	26	10	106
2nd place, silver medalist(s)	Conrad Haugsted	Denmark	80	22	3	102
3rd place, bronze medalist(s)	Jasper De Buyst	Belgium	80	18	1	98
4	Ben Wiggins	Great Britain	80	12	6	92
5	Benjamin Thomas	France	60	24	14	84
6	Philip Heijnen	Netherlands	80	2	12	82
7	Juan David Sierra	Italy	60	17	2	77
8	Diogo Narciso	Portugal	60	7	13	67
9	Alan Banaszek	Poland	60	0	8	60
10	Matti Dobbins	Ireland	40	15	4	55
11	Milan Kadlec	Czech Republic	40	6	7	46
12	Egor Igoshev	Individual Neutral Athletes	40	5	9	45
13	Maj Flajs	Slovenia	20	3	17	23
14	Gustav Johansson	Sweden	20	0	18	20
15	Mustafa Tarakçı	Turkey	0	8	20	8
16	Matteo Constant	Switzerland	0	7	15	7
17	Daniel Crista	Romania	0	6	5	6
18	Maximilian Schmidbauer	Austria	0	3	11	3
19	Sebastián Mora	Spain	0	0	9	0
20	Charel Meyers	Luxembourg	−20	0	21	−20
21	Vitaliy Hryniv	Ukraine	−40	5	16	−35
22	Tadeáš Cesnek	Slovakia	−40	0	–	DNF
22	Kiryl Hutsko	Individual Neutral Athletes	−40	1	–	DNF
