= 2021 UEC European Track Championships – Men's scratch =

Cycling competition

Men's scratch at the 2021 UEC European Track Championships
- Venue: Tissot Velodrome, Grenchen
- Date: 7 October
- Competitors: 23 from 23 nations

Medalists
gold medal	Rui Oliveira	Portugal
silver medal	Vincent Hoppezak	Netherlands
bronze medal	JB Murphy	Ireland

The men's scratch competition at the 2021 UEC European Track Championships was held on 7 October 2021.

== Results ==
First rider across the line without a net lap loss wins.

Rank	Name	Nation	Laps down
1st place, gold medalist(s)	Rui Oliveira	Portugal	
2nd place, silver medalist(s)	Vincent Hoppezak	Netherlands	
3rd place, bronze medalist(s)	JB Murphy	Ireland	–1
4	Dzianis Mazur	Belarus	–1
5	Roman Gladysh	Ukraine	–1
6	Tristan Marguet	Switzerland	–1
7	Bartosz Rudyk	Poland	–1
8	Tobias Hansen	Denmark	–1
9	Daniel Babor	Czech Republic	–1
10	Theo Reinhardt	Germany	–1
11	Morgan Kneisky	France	–1
12	Krisztián Lovassy	Hungary	–1
13	Lindsay De Vylder	Belgium	–1
14	Mattia Pinazzi	Italy	–1
15	Rhys Britton	Great Britain	–1
16	Sergey Rostovtsev	Russia	–1
17	Rotem Tene	Israel	–1
18	Justas Beniušis	Lithuania	–1
19	Sebastián Mora	Spain	–1
20	Martin Chren	Slovakia	–1
21	Zisis Soulios	Greece	–2
22	Nikolay Genov	Bulgaria	DNF
22	Vitālijs Korņilovs	Latvia	DNF
	Maximilian Schmidbauer	Austria	DNS
