= 2025 UEC European Track Championships – Men's elimination race =

Men's elimination race at the 2025 UEC European Track Championships
- Venue: Velodroom Limburg, Heusden-Zolder
- Date: 12 February
- Competitors: 22 from 22 nations

Medalists
gold medal	Tim Torn Teutenberg	Germany
silver medal	Rui Oliveira	Portugal
bronze medal	Jules Hesters	Belgium

The men's elimination race competition at the 2025 UEC European Track Championships was held on 12 February 2025.

== Results ==
Rank	Name	Nation
1st place, gold medalist(s)	Tim Torn Teutenberg	Germany
2nd place, silver medalist(s)	Rui Oliveira	Portugal
3rd place, bronze medalist(s)	Jules Hesters	Belgium
4	Noah Wulff	Denmark
5	Tim Wafler	Austria
6	Yoeri Havik	Netherlands
7	Mario Anguela	Spain
8	William Perrett	Great Britain
9	Emmanuel Houcou	France
10	Ramazan Yılmaz	Turkey
11	Grigorii Skorniakov	Individual Neutral Athletes 2
12	Pavol Rovder	Slovakia
13	Milan Kadlec	Czech Republic
14	Adam Woźniak	Poland
15	Elia Viviani	Italy
16	Amit Keinan	Israel
17	Nikolas Klimavičius	Lithuania
18	Luca Bühlmann	Switzerland
19	Vitālijs Korņilovs	Latvia
20	Matvey Ushakov	Ukraine
21	Hugo Porath	Sweden
22	Vid Murn	Slovenia
