= 2026 UEC European Track Championships – Men's madison =

Men's madison at the 2026 UEC Track Elite European Championships
- Venue: Konya Velodrome, Konya
- Date: 5 February
- Competitors: 34 from 17 nations
- Teams: 17
- Winning points: 85

Medalists
gold medal	Moritz Augenstein; Roger Kluge	Germany
silver medal	Iúri Leitão; Diogo Narciso	Portugal
bronze medal	Jasper De Buyst; Jules Hesters	Belgium

The men's madison competition at the 2026 UEC European Track Championships was held on 5 February 2026.

== Results ==
200 laps (50 km) with 20 sprints were raced.

Rank	Name	Nation	Lap points	Sprint points	Finish order	Total points
1st place, gold medalist(s)	Moritz Augenstein; Roger Kluge	Germany	40	45	9	85
2nd place, silver medalist(s)	Iúri Leitão; Diogo Narciso	Portugal	20	35	4	55
3rd place, bronze medalist(s)	Jasper De Buyst; Jules Hesters	Belgium	0	38	1	38
4	Yoeri Havik; Vincent Hoppezak	Netherlands	0	32	3	32
5	Simone Consonni; Juan David Sierra	Italy	0	31	2	31
6	Lasse Norman Leth; Robin Juel Skivild	Denmark	0	19	5	19
7	Benjamin Thomas; Valentin Tabellion	France	0	14	10	14
8	Matyáš Koblížek; Milan Kadlec	Czech Republic	0	1	8	1
9	Matteo Constant; Noah Bögli	Switzerland	0	1	11	1
10	Oliver Wood; Mark Stewart	Great Britain	−20	15	6	−5
11	Daniel Staniszewski; Alan Banaszek	Poland	−60	0	7	−60
12	Álvaro Navas; Héctor Álvarez	Spain	−20	0	–	DNF
12	Maximilian Schmidbauer; Franz-Josef Lässer	Austria	0	0	–	DNF
12	Nejc Peterlin; Maj Flajs	Slovenia	−20	0	–	DNF
12	Vitaliy Hryniv; Roman Gladysh	Ukraine	−20	0	–	DNF
12	Mustafa Tarakcı; Emre Kaplan	Turkey	−20	0	–	DNF
12	Daniel Crista; Mihnea Harasim	Romania	−20	0	–	DNF
