= Ivo Oliveira =

Portuguese bicycle racer

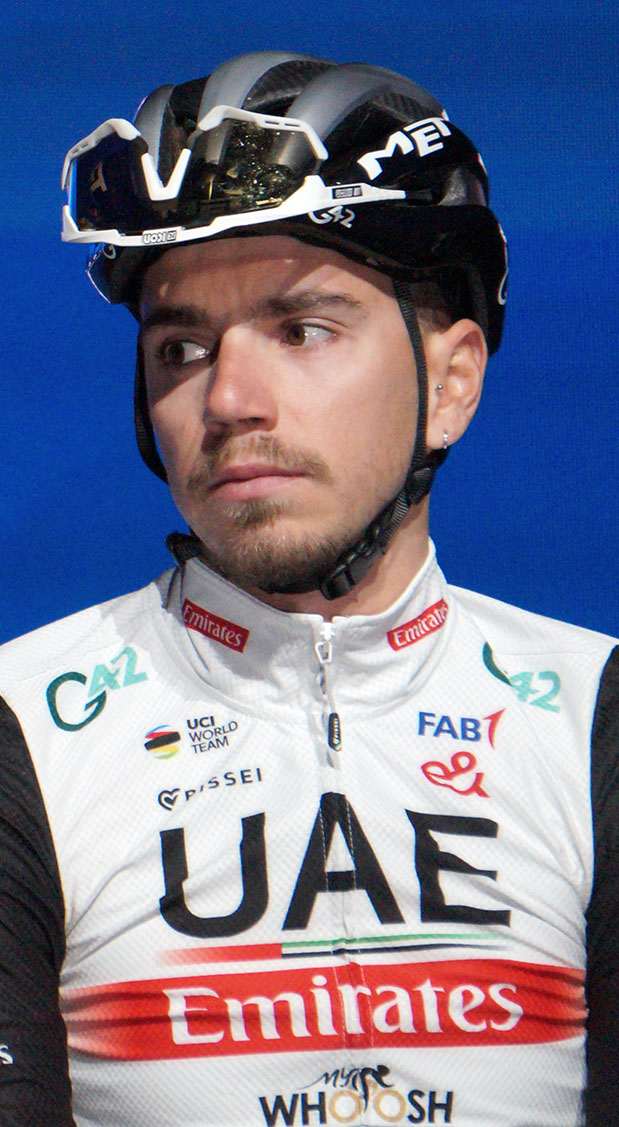
- Oliveira in 2023

Personal information
- Full name: Ivo Emanuel Alves Oliveira
- Born: 5 September 1996 (age 30) Vila Nova de Gaia, Portugal
- Height: 1.85 m (6 ft 1 in)
- Weight: 68 kg (150 lb)

Cycling career
- Sport: Cycling
- Current team: UAE Team Emirates XRG
- Disciplines: Track; Road
- Role: Rider

Amateur team
- 2015–2016: Liberty Seguros-Carglass

Professional teams
- 2017–2018: Axeon–Hagens Berman
- 2019–: UAE Team Emirates

Major wins
- Grand Tours Vuelta a España 1 TTT stage (2025) One-day races and Classics National Road Race Championships (2023, 2025) National Time Trial Championships (2020)
Medal record
Men's track cycling
Representing Portugal
World Championships
| Silver medal – second place | 2018 Apeldoorn | Individual pursuit |
| Silver medal – second place | 2026 Shanghai | Madison |
| Bronze medal – third place | 2022 Saint-Quentin-en-Yvelines | Individual pursuit |
European Championships
| Gold medal – first place | 2020 Plovdiv | Individual pursuit |
| Silver medal – second place | 2017 Berlin | Individual pursuit |
| Silver medal – second place | 2018 Glasgow | Individual pursuit |
| Silver medal – second place | 2020 Plovdiv | Madison |
| Silver medal – second place | 2025 Heusden-Zolder | Individual pursuit |
| Bronze medal – third place | 2025 Heusden-Zolder | Madison |
Junior World Championships
| Gold medal – first place | 2014 Gwangmyeong | Individual pursuit |
| Bronze medal – third place | 2013 Glasgow | Points race |
| Bronze medal – third place | 2014 Gwangmyeong | Madison |
U23 & Junior European Championships
| Gold medal – first place | 2014 Anadia | Junior Individual pursuit |
| Silver medal – second place | 2016 Montichiari | U23 Individual pursuit |
| Silver medal – second place | 2017 Sangalhos | U23 Individual pursuit |
| Bronze medal – third place | 2014 Anadia | Junior Omnium |
| Bronze medal – third place | 2016 Montichiari | U23 Omnium |

Ivo Emanuel Alves Oliveira (born 5 September 1996) is a Portuguese racing cyclist, who currently rides for UCI WorldTeam UAE Team Emirates XRG. He competed in the points race at the 2016 UCI Track Cycling World Championships. His twin brother, Rui Oliveira, is also an international track cyclist. In 2018, he became the first Portuguese rider to win a medal in the UCI Track Cycling World Championships. In October 2020, he was named in the startlist for the 2020 Vuelta a España.

== Major results ==
=== Road ===
2014
1st Road race, National Junior Championships
2017
1st Prologue Grand Prix Priessnitz spa
2018
1st Time trial, National Under-23 Championships
1st Stage 3b Circuit des Ardennes
2020 (1 pro win)
1st Time trial, National Championships
2022
2nd Time trial, National Championships
2023 (2)
National Championships

1st Road race
2nd Time trial

4th Overall Boucles de la Mayenne

1st Prologue

2024
National Championships

2nd Time trial
5th Road race

5th Vuelta a Castilla y León
2025 (4)
National Championships

1st Road race
3rd Time trial

Giro d'Abruzzo

1st Stages 2 & 4

1st Stage 5 Tour of Slovenia
1st Stage 5 (TTT) Vuelta a España
2026
Tour de Kyushu
1st Overall, 1st stage 2&3

==== Grand Tour general classification results timeline ====
| Grand Tour | 2020 | 2021 | 2022 | 2023 | 2024 | 2025 |
|---|---|---|---|---|---|---|
| Giro d'Italia | — | — | — | — | — | — |
| Tour de France | — | — | — | — | — | — |
| Vuelta a España | 101 | — | 131 | — | — | 109 |

Legend
| — | Did not compete |
| DNF | Did not finish |
| NH | Not Held |

=== Track ===
2013
National Junior Championships

1st Individual pursuit
2nd Points race

3rd Points race, UCI World Junior Championships
2014
UCI World Junior Championships

1st Individual pursuit
3rd Madison (with Rui Oliveira)

UEC European Junior Championships

1st Individual pursuit
3rd Omnium

National Junior Championships

1st Team pursuit
1st Team sprint
1st Omnium

2016
National Championships

1st Individual pursuit
1st Kilo

UEC European Under-23 Championships

2nd Individual pursuit
3rd Omnium

2017
National Championships

1st Individual pursuit
1st Points race
1st Omnium

UCI World Cup, Minsk

2nd Individual pursuit
2nd Scratch
3rd Points race
3rd Madison (with Rui Oliveira)

2nd Individual pursuit, UEC European Championships
2nd Individual pursuit, UEC European Under-23 Championships
2018
National Championships

1st Madison (with Rui Oliveira)
1st Omnium

2nd Individual pursuit, UCI World Championships
2nd Individual pursuit, UEC European Championships
2019
National Championships

1st Individual pursuit
1st Points race
1st Omnium

2020
UEC European Championships

1st Individual pursuit
2nd Madison (with Rui Oliveira)

2022
3rd Individual pursuit, UCI World Championships
2025
UEC European Championships

2nd Individual pursuit
3rd Madison (with Rui Oliveira)

2026
2nd Madison, UCI World Championships (with Iúri Leitão)
