= Rui Oliveira =

Portuguese bicycle racer (born 1996)

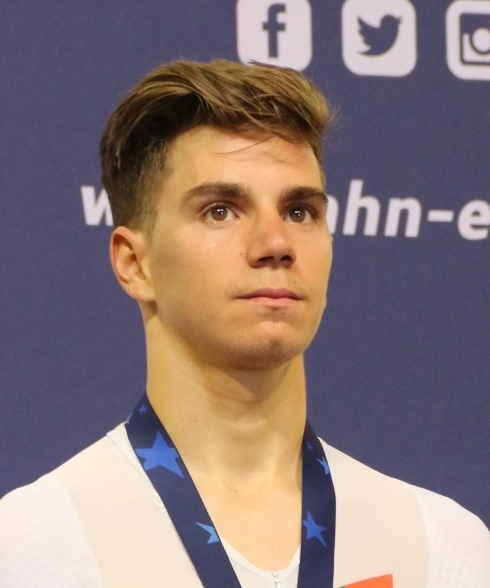
- Oliveira at the 2017 UEC European Track Championships

Personal information
- Full name: Rui Filipe Alves Oliveira
- Born: 5 September 1996 (age 30) Vila Nova de Gaia, Portugal
- Height: 1.83 m (6 ft 0 in)
- Weight: 67 kg (148 lb)

Cycling career
- Sport: Cycling
- Current team: UAE Team Emirates XRG
- Disciplines: Track; Road
- Role: Rider

Amateur team
- 2015–2016: Liberty Seguros-Carglass

Professional teams
- 2017–2018: Axeon–Hagens Berman
- 2019–: UAE Team Emirates

Major wins
- Track Olympic Games Madison (2024)
Medal record
Men's track cycling
Representing Portugal
Olympic Games
Gold medal – first place	2024 Paris	Madison
European Championships
Gold medal – first place	2021 Grenchen	Scratch
Silver medal – second place	2018 Glasgow	Elimination
Silver medal – second place	2020 Plovdiv	Madison
Silver medal – second place	2023 Grenchen	Elimination
Silver medal – second place	2025 Heusden-Zolder	Elimination
Bronze medal – third place	2017 Berlin	Elimination
Bronze medal – third place	2021 Grenchen	Madison
Bronze medal – third place	2025 Heusden-Zolder	Madison
Junior World Championships
Bronze medal – third place	2014 Gwangmyeong	Scratch
Bronze medal – third place	2014 Gwangmyeong	Madison
U23 & Junior European Championships
Silver medal – second place	2013 Anadia	Junior Scratch
Bronze medal – third place	2014 Anadia	Junior Scratch

Rui Filipe Alves Oliveira (European Portuguese pronunciation: [ˈʁuj fɨˈlipɨ ˈalvɨz ɔliˈvɐjɾɐ]; born 5 September 1996) is a Portuguese cyclist, who currently rides for UCI WorldTeam UAE Team Emirates XRG. He competed in the scratch event at the 2015 UCI Track Cycling World Championships. His twin brother, Ivo Oliveira, is also an international track cyclist.

In October 2020, he was named in the startlist for the 2020 Vuelta a España.

Competing in his first Olympic Games in Paris 2024, he won a gold medal in the Madison event alongside Iúri Leitão.

== Major results ==
=== Road ===
2017
8th Overall Joe Martin Stage Race

1st Young rider classification

2018
1st Road race, National Under-23 Championships
6th Arno Wallaard Memorial
7th Handzame Classic
7th ZLM Tour
9th Primus Classic
2021
2nd Road race, National Championships
2022
4th Road race, National Championships
2023
2nd Road race, National Championships
8th Trofeo Ses Salines–Alcúdia
9th Omloop Het Nieuwsblad
2024
2nd Road race, National Championships
3rd Super 8 Classic
8th Binche–Chimay–Binche
9th Clàssica Comunitat Valenciana 1969
10th Grand Prix de Wallonie
2025
7th Vuelta a Castilla y León
2026 (1 pro win)
1st Stage 10 Volta a Portugal
3rd Road race, National Championships
7th Muscat Classic

==== Grand Tour general classification results timeline ====
Grand Tour	2020	2021	2022	2023	2024
Giro d'Italia	—	—	141	—	121
Tour de France	—	—	—	—	—
Vuelta a España	119	74	—	148	—

Legend
—	Did not compete
DNF	Did not finish

=== Track ===
2013
1st Scratch, National Junior Championships
2014
National Junior Championships

1st Sprint
1st Team sprint
1st Team pursuit

UCI World Junior Championships

3rd Scratch
3rd Madison (with Ivo Oliveira)

3rd Scratch, UEC European Junior Championships
2016
1st Keirin, National Championships
2017
1st Elimination, UEC European Under-23 Championships
3rd Elimination, UEC European Championships
3rd Madison, UCI World Cup, Minsk (with Ivo Oliveira)
2018
1st Madison, National Championships (with Ivo Oliveira)
2nd Elimination, UEC European Championships
2019
National Championships

1st Madison (with João Matias)
1st Omnium

3rd Omnium, UCI World Cup, Minsk
2020
2nd Madison, UEC European Championships (with Ivo Oliveira)
2021
UEC European Championships

1st Scratch
3rd Madison (with Iúri Leitão)

2023
2nd Elimination, UEC European Championships
2024
1st Madison, Olympic Games (with Iúri Leitão)
2025
UEC European Championships

2nd Elimination
3rd Madison (with Ivo Oliveira)
