= JB Murphy =

Irish sport cyclist

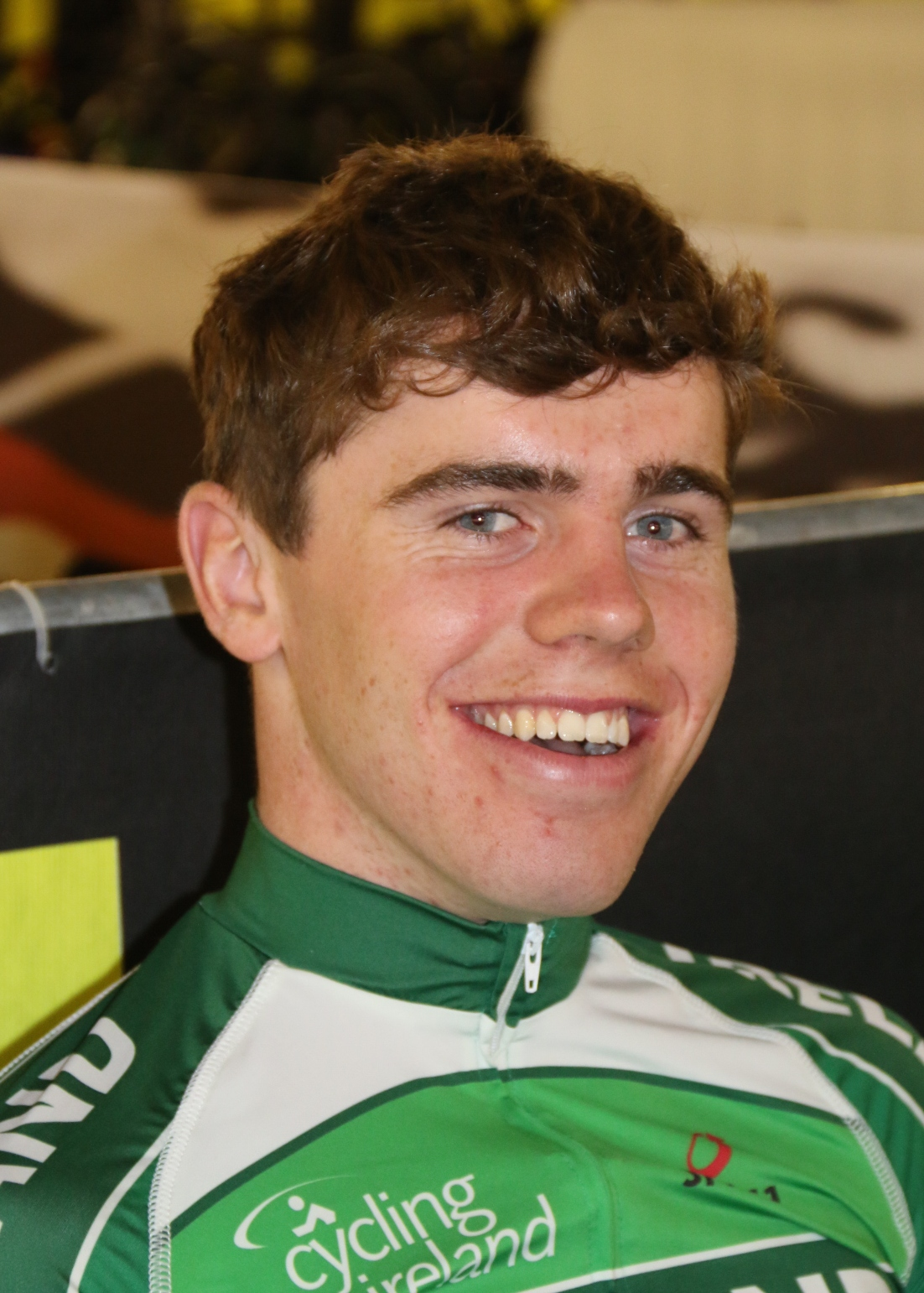
- Murphy in 2017

Personal information
- Full name: Jack Bernard Murphy
- Born: 22 October 1999 (age 26) Kildare, Ireland

Cycling career
- Sport: Cycling
- Current team: EvoPro Racing
- Disciplines: Road; Track
- Role: Rider

Amateur teams
- 2016–2019: Murphy Surveys Kilcullen CC
- 2020–2021: Arabay Team

Professional team
- 2022–: EvoPro Racing
Medal record
Men's track cycling
Representing Ireland
European Championships
Bronze medal – third place	2021 Grenchen	Scratch

Jack Bernard "JB" Murphy (born 22 October 1999) is an Irish racing cyclist, who currently rides for UCI Continental team EvoPro Racing.

== Major results ==
=== Track ===
2018
3rd Keirin, National Championships
2021
3rd Scratch, UEC European Championships

=== Road ===
2019
1st Stage 4 Rás Mumhan
3rd Overall Tour of Ulster

1st Stage 2

=== Cyclo-cross ===
2016–2017
1st National Junior Championships
