= Moritz Augenstein =

German track cyclist

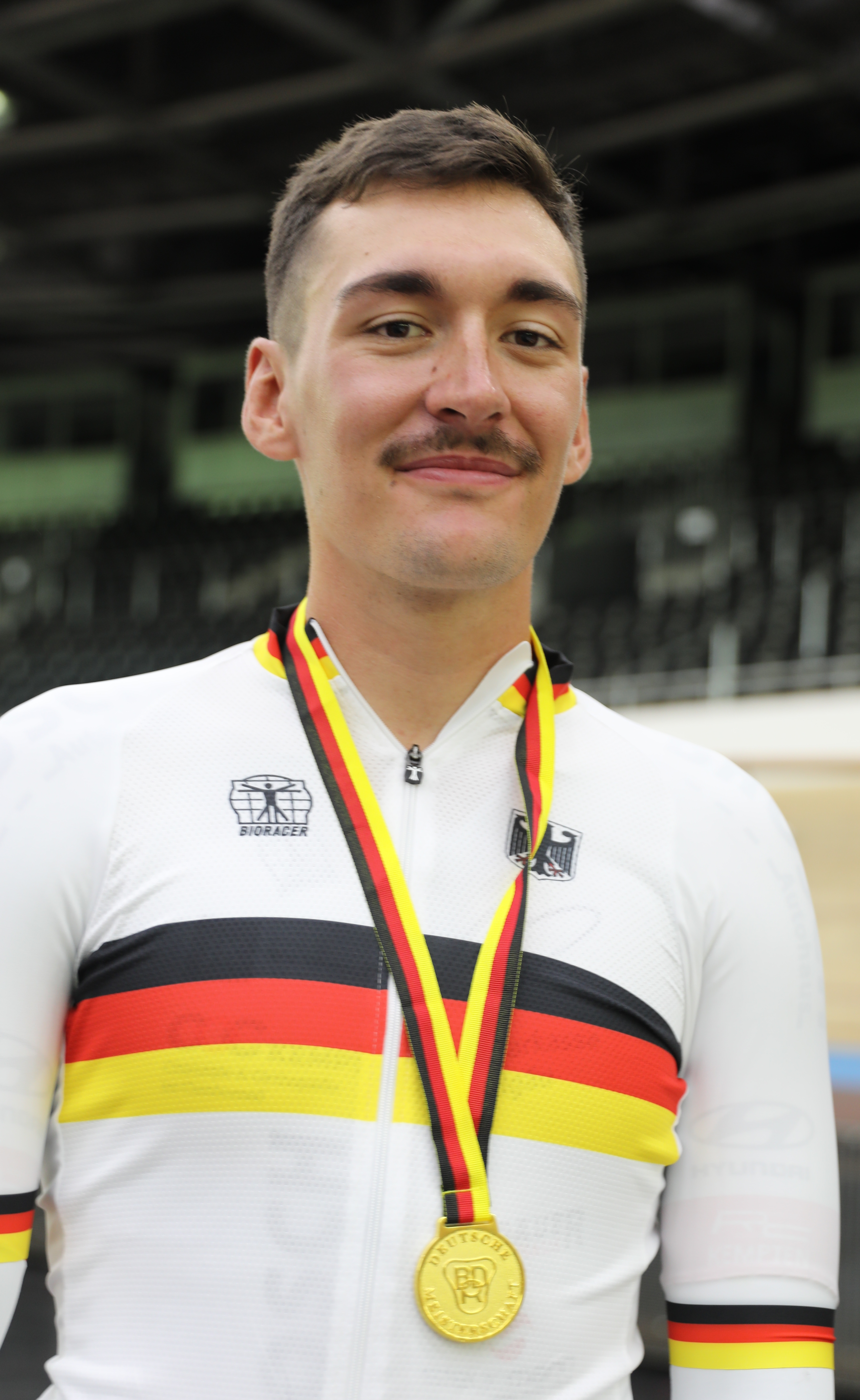
- Augenstein in 2024

Personal information
- Born: 16 April 1997 (age 29) Pforzheim, Germany

Cycling career
- Sport: Cycling
- Current team: RSV Irschenberg
- Discipline: Track
- Role: Rider

Amateur teams
- 2006–2021: RSV Ellmendingen
- 2016–2017: Maloja Pushbikers Back
- 2018: KED Stevens Radteam Berlin
- 2022–2024: RSC Kempten
- 2025–: RSV Irschenberg

Major wins
- Track World Championships Scratch (2025)
Medal record
Men's track cycling
Representing Germany
World Championships
Gold medal – first place	2025 Santiago	Scratch
Bronze medal – third place	2026 Shanghai	Madison
European Championships
Gold medal – first place	2026 Konya	Madison

Moritz Augenstein (born 16 April 1997) is a German track cyclist. He was a gold medalist at the 2025 UCI Track Cycling World Championships in the men's scratch race.

== Career ==
In September 2024, Augenstein fell at the German Criterium Championships when a pedestrian crossed the street in front of him, and Augenstein suffered multiple shoulder fractures and was unable to compete at the 2024 World Championships.

In January 2025, Augenstein was part of a group of six German cyclists who were seriously injured in a training accident in Mallorca after an 89 year-old man drove into them whilst they were on a group training ride. He had to undergo shoulder surgery and missed the 2025 European Track Championships the following month.

In September 2025, Augenstein became European Derny Champion behind pacemaker Christian Ertel.

In October 2025, he won the gold medal at the 2025 UCI Track Cycling World Championships in the men's scratch race in Santiago, Chile. Alongside Roger Kluge he also placed fourth in the men's madison at the Championships.

== Major results ==
=== Track ===
2014
3rd Points race, National Junior Championships
2015
1st Madison (with Moritz Malcharek), National Junior Championships
2022
1st Derny, National Championships
2023
National Championships

1st Madison (with Moritz Malcharek)
1st Scratch
1st Points race
1st Derny

2024
National Championships

1st Madison (with Moritz Malcharek)
1st Scratch
1st Points race
3rd Elimination

2025
1st Scratch, UCI World Championships
1st Derny, UEC European Championships
2026
1st Madison, UEC European Championships (with Roger Kluge)
3rd Madison, UCI World Championships (with Roger Kluge)
