= 2017 UEC European Track Championships – Men's individual pursuit =

Event at the European Track Championship

Men's individual pursuit at the 2017 UEC European Track Championships
- UEC European Champion jersey
- Venue: Velodrom, Berlin
- Date: 21 October 2017
- Competitors: 30 from 20 nations
- Winning time: 4:15.994

Medalists
gold medal	Filippo Ganna	Italy
silver medal	Ivo Oliveira	Portugal
bronze medal	Domenic Weinstein	Germany

The Men's individual pursuit was held on 21 October 2017.

== Results ==
=== Qualifying ===
The fastest 4 competitors qualify for the medal finals.

Rank	Name	Nation	Time	Notes
1	Ivo Oliveira	Portugal	4:14.570	QG
2	Filippo Ganna	Italy	4:14.914	QG
3	Alexander Evtushenko	Russia	4:15.204	QB
4	Domenic Weinstein	Germany	4:16.290	QB
5	Claudio Imhof	Switzerland	4:16.681	
6	Corentin Ermenault	France	4:17.809	
7	Sasha Weemaes	Belgium	4:19.518	
8	Kersten Thiele	Germany	4:19.838	
9	Dion Beukeboom	Netherlands	4:20.594	
10	Bartosz Rudyk	Poland	4:20.754	
11	Daniel Staniszewski	Poland	4:22.710	
12	Casper von Folsach	Denmark	4:23.206	
13	Thomas Denis	France	4:24.155	
14	Nicolas Pietrula	Czech Republic	4:24.388	
15	Siarhei Papok	Belarus	4:24.941	
16	Oliver Wood	Great Britain	4:25.278	
17	Michele Scartezzini	Italy	4:26.274	
18	Edgar Stepanyan	Armenia	4:26.923	
19	Mikhail Shemetau	Belarus	4:28.331	
20	Illart Zuazubiskar	Spain	4:29.621	
21	Volodymyr Dzhus	Ukraine	4:29.763	
22	Frank Pasche	Switzerland	4:30.374	
23	Gerben Thijssen	Belgium	4:33.496	
24	Illya Klepikov	Ukraine	4:37.292	
25	Andrej Strmiska	Slovakia	4:38.438	
26	Vicente García de Mateos	Spain	4:38.549	
27	Vitālijs Korņilovs	Latvia	4:39.828	
28	Daniel Crista	Romania	4:40.302	
29	Alexandru Ciocan	Romania	5:03.931	
	Xeno Young	Ireland	DSQ	

=== Finals ===
The final classification is determined in the medal finals.

Rank	Name	Nation	Time	Notes
Bronze medal final
3rd place, bronze medalist(s)	Domenic Weinstein	Germany	4:15.405	
4	Alexander Evtushenko	Russia	4:17.470	
Gold medal final
1st place, gold medalist(s)	Filippo Ganna	Italy	4:15.994	
2nd place, silver medalist(s)	Ivo Oliveira	Portugal	4:18.991	
