= Iúri Leitão =

Portuguese cyclist (born 1998)

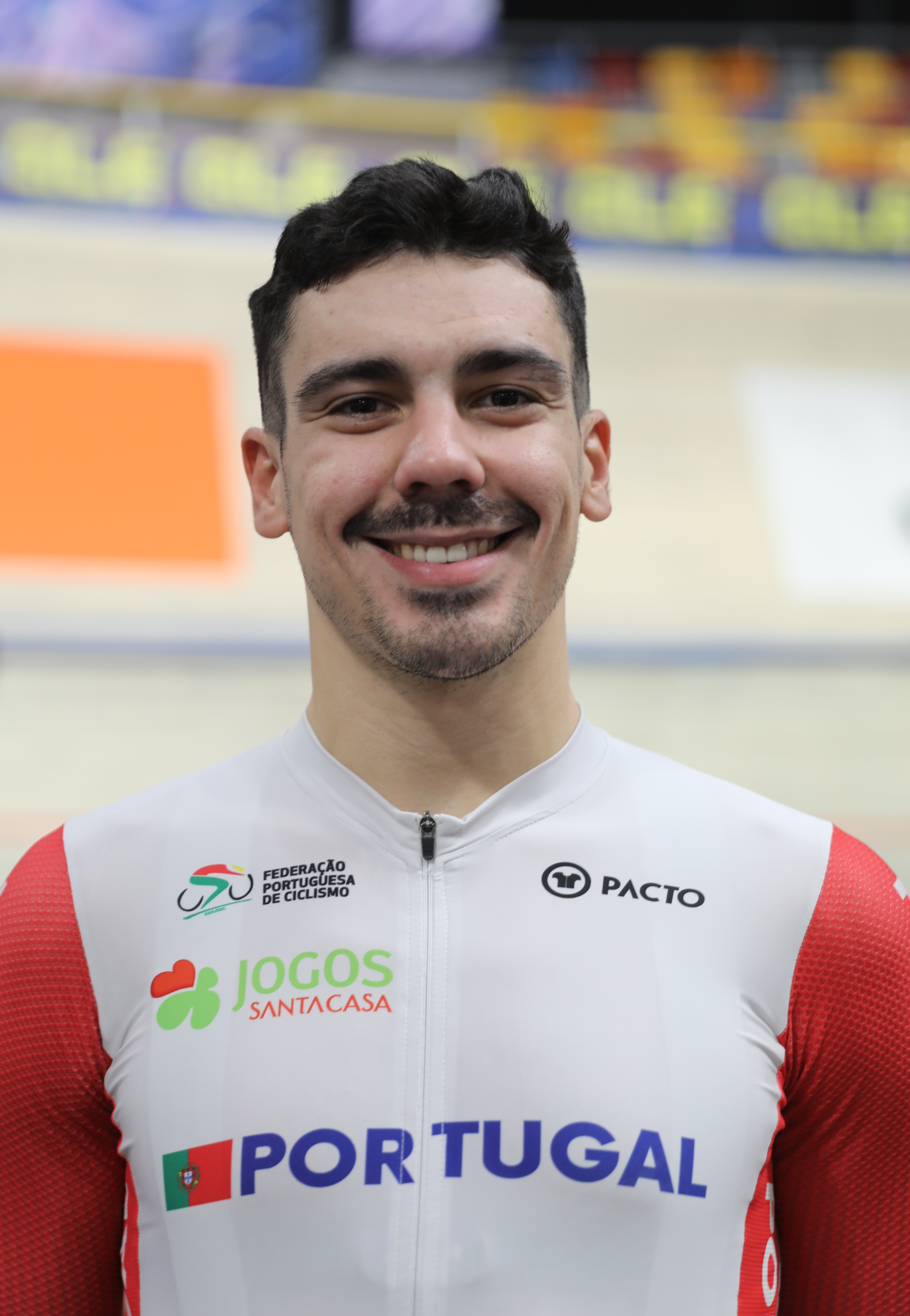
- Leitão at the 2024 UEC European Track Championships

Personal information
- Full name: Iúri Gabriel Dantas Leitão
- Born: 3 July 1998 (age 28) Viana do Castelo, Portugal
- Height: 1.75 m (5 ft 9 in)
- Weight: 65 kg (143 lb)

Cycling career
- Sport: Cycling
- Current team: Caja Rural–Seguros RGA
- Disciplines: Track; Road
- Role: Rider

Amateur teams
- 2017: Miranda–Mortágua
- 2018–2019: Sicasal–Constantinos–Delta Cafés
- 2020: Super Froiz

Professional teams
- 2021: Tavfer–Measindot–Mortágua
- 2022–: Caja Rural–Seguros RGA

Major wins
- Track Olympic Games Madison (2024) World Championships Omnium (2023, 2026)
Medal record
Men's track cycling
Representing Portugal
Olympic Games
Gold medal – first place	2024 Paris	Madison
Silver medal – second place	2024 Paris	Omnium
World Championships
Gold medal – first place	2023 Glasgow	Omnium
Gold medal – first place	2026 Shanghai	Omnium
Silver medal – second place	2021 Roubaix	Elimination
Silver medal – second place	2026 Shanghai	Madison
Bronze medal – third place	2025 Santiago	Scratch
European Championships
Gold medal – first place	2020 Plovdiv	Scratch
Gold medal – first place	2022 Munich	Scratch
Gold medal – first place	2024 Apeldoorn	Scratch
Gold medal – first place	2025 Heusden-Zolder	Points race
Gold medal – first place	2025 Heusden-Zolder	Scratch
Gold medal – first place	2026 Konya	Omnium
Silver medal – second place	2020 Plovdiv	Elimination
Silver medal – second place	2021 Grenchen	Points race
Silver medal – second place	2026 Konya	Madison
Bronze medal – third place	2020 Plovdiv	Omnium
Bronze medal – third place	2021 Grenchen	Madison
U23 & Junior European Championships
Silver medal – second place	2020 Fiorenzuola	Under-23 points race
Silver medal – second place	2020 Fiorenzuola	Under-23 scratch

Iúri Gabriel Dantas Leitão (Portuguese pronunciation: [ˈjuɾi ɡɐbɾiˈɛl ˈdɐ̃tɐʃ lejˈtɐ̃w̃]; born 3 July 1998) is a Portuguese road and track cyclist, who currently rides for UCI ProTeam Caja Rural–Seguros RGA. He won a silver medal in the elimination event at the 2021 World Championships. Two years later, Leitão became the first Portuguese to win a world championship title in track cycling after winning the 2023 World Championships omnium event. He repeated this feat at the 2026 UCI Track Cycling World Championships. Competing in his first Olympic Games in Paris 2024, he won a gold medal in the Madison event alongside Rui Oliveira and the silver medal in the omnium event, making him the first Portuguese track cyclist to win an Olympic medal, the first Portuguese sportsperson to win two Olympic medals in a single edition, and his country's first-ever Olympic champion in a sport other than athletics.

== Major results ==
=== Road ===
2018
1st Stage 5 Volta a Portugal do Futuro
2021
Volta ao Alentejo

1st Points classification
1st Stages 2 & 3

2022
6th Overall Ronde de l'Oise

1st Stage 2

2023 (3 pro wins)
1st Overall International Tour of Hellas

1st Points classification
1st Stage 3

GP Beiras e Serra da Estrela

1st Stages 2 & 3

1st Stage 2 CRO Race
2024 (1)
Volta ao Alentejo

1st Points classification
1st Stage 5

1st Stage 1a (ITT) International Tour of Hellas
1st Stage 2 GP Beiras e Serra da Estrela
2025 (1)
1st Trofeo Palma
9th Clásica de Almería
2026 (2)
1st Classic Loire Atlantique
1st Stage 8 Tour of Magnificent Qinghai
1st Stage 2 GP Anicolor
2nd Route Adélie de Vitré
4th Trofeo Palma

=== Track ===
2016
1st Points race, National Junior Championships
2018
3rd Scratch, National Championships
2019
3rd Madison, National Championships (with Wilson Esperanca)
2020
UEC European Championships

1st Scratch
2nd Elimination
3rd Omnium

National Championships

1st Scratch
2nd Individual pursuit
2nd Points race

UEC European Under-23 Championships

2nd Scratch
2nd Points race
2nd Elimination

2021
National Championships

1st Madison (with Daniel Dias)
1st Omnium

UCI Champions League

1st Elimination, London
2nd Scratch, Palma

2nd Elimination, UCI World Championships
UEC European Championships

2nd Points race
3rd Madison (with Rui Oliveira)

UCI Nations Cup, St. Petersburg

2nd Madison (with João Matias)
2nd Omnium

2022
1st Scratch, UEC European Championships
National Championships

1st Madison (with João Matias)
1st Scratch
2nd Omnium

2023
1st Omnium, UCI World Championships
2024
Olympic Games

1st Madison (with Rui Oliveira)
2nd Omnium

1st Scratch, UEC European Championships
2025
UEC European Championships

1st Points race
1st Scratch

3rd Scratch, UCI World Championships
2026
UCI World Championships

1st Omnium
2nd Madison (with Ivo Oliveira)

1st Omnium, UEC European Championships
