= Clément Petit (cyclist) =

French cyclist (born 2001)

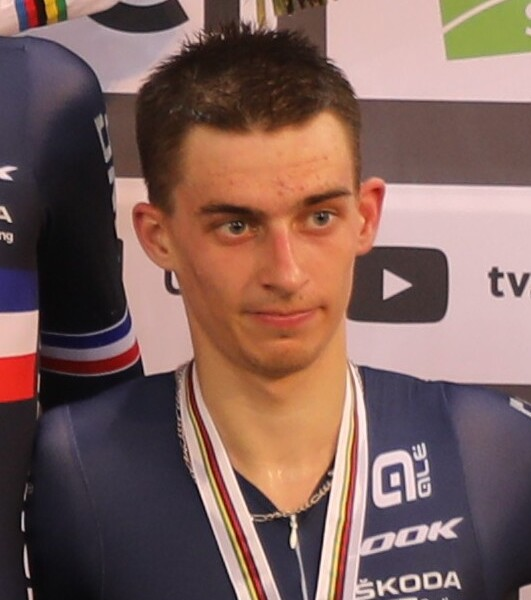
- Petit in 2019

Personal information
- Born: 7 February 2001 (age 25) Dreux, France

Cycling career
- Sport: Cycling
- Current team: VC Rouen 76
- Disciplines: Track; Road
- Role: Rider

Amateur teams
- 2017–2019: UV Neubourg
- 2020–2021: USSA Pavilly Barentin
- 2022–: VC Rouen 76
Medal record
Men's track cycling
Representing France
World Championships
Bronze medal – third place	2024 Ballerup	Scratch
Bronze medal – third place	2025 Santiago	Points race
World Junior Championships
Silver medal – second place	2019 Frankfurt	Points race
Bronze medal – third place	2019 Frankfurt	Madison

Clément Petit (born 7 February 2001) is a French road and track cyclist, who currently rides for club team VC Rouen 76. He won the bronze medal in the scratch race at the 2024 UCI Track Cycling World Championships.

== Major results ==
=== Track ===
2019
UCI World Junior Championships

2nd Team pursuit
3rd Madison (with Kévin Vauquelin)

2021
National Championships

3rd Madison
3rd Team pursuit

2022
3rd Team pursuit, UEC European Under-23 Championships
2024
1st Team pursuit, National Championships
3rd Scratch, UCI World Championships
2025
3rd Points race, UCI World Championships

=== Road ===
2021
5th Paris–Mantes Cycliste
2024
1st Overall Route Vendéenne

1st Stage 3 (TTT)

1st Prix des Vins Nouveaux
1st Grand Prix de Saint-Amand-Montrond
1st Grand Prix de la Communauté de Communes des 4 Rivières
3rd Grand Prix des Marbriers
