= William Tidball =

British road and track cyclist (born 2000)

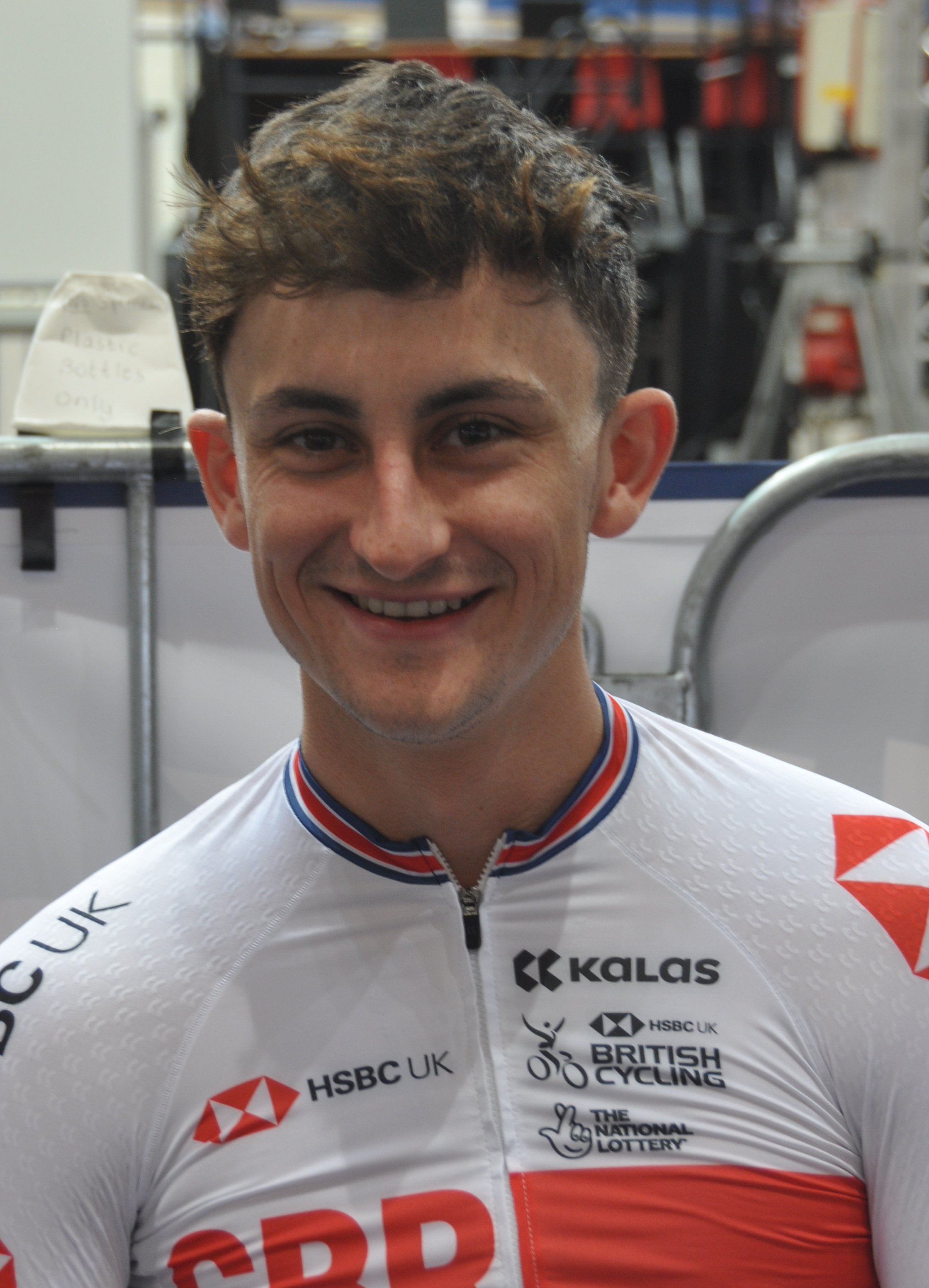
- Tidball in 2021

Personal information
- Born: 22 April 2000 (age 26) Exmouth, England

Cycling career
- Sport: Cycling
- Current team: Saint Piran
- Disciplines: Track, road
- Role: Rider

Amateur teams
- 2019–2020: Team Inspired
- 2021–2022: GB Cycling Senior Academy

Professional teams
- 2023–2024: Saint Piran
- 2026–: VC Villefranche Beaujolais

Major wins
- Track World Championships Scratch (2023)
Medal record
Men's track cycling
Representing Great Britain
World Championships
Gold medal – first place	2023 Glasgow	Scratch
European Championships
Silver medal – second place	2024 Apeldoorn	Elimination
Silver medal – second place	2025 Heusden-Zolder	Team pursuit
Bronze medal – third place	2021 Grenchen	Team pursuit
Bronze medal – third place	2022 Munich	Team pursuit
Bronze medal – third place	2025 Heusden-Zolder	Scratch
Bronze medal – third place	2026 Konya	Team pursuit
Representing England
Commonwealth Games
Gold medal – first place	2026 Glasgow	Team pursuit

William Tidball (born 22 April 2000) is a British road and track cyclist. He was the 2023 world champion in the scratch race, winning the title at the 2023 UCI Cycling World Championships in Glasgow. He was also a member of the England team that won the gold medal in the team pursuit at the 2026 Commonwealth Games.

== Career ==
At the 2022 British National Track Championships in Newport, Wales he won a British title after winning the scratch event.

Tidball won his second national title at the 2023 British Cycling National Track Championships, he won the Team Pursuit for the first time, as part of the Saint Piran team.

At the 2026 Commonwealth Games in Glasgow, Tidball was a member of the English line-up that won gold in the team pursuit. Joining the team as a replacement following illness to a teammate on the day of the race, Tidball helped England defeat Australia in the final.

== Major results ==
=== Road ===
2018
7th Kuurne–Brussels–Kuurne Juniores
2022
6th Youngster Coast Challenge
2023
5th Overall Tour du Loir et Cher

1st Stage 3

=== Track ===
2017
3rd Madison, National Championships (with Ethan Vernon)
2018
1st Madison, National Junior Championships (with Ethan Vernon)
3rd Team pursuit, UCI World Cup, London
2019
National Championships

2nd Team pursuit
3rd Scratch

2021
UEC European Under-23 Championships

1st Madison (with Rhys Britton)
2nd Team pursuit
3rd Elimination

3rd Team pursuit, UEC European Championships
3rd Scratch, UCI Champions League, London
2022
UEC European Under-23 Championships

1st Scratch
2nd Madison (with Sam Watson)

1st Scratch, National Championships
3rd Team pursuit, UEC European Championships
2023
1st Scratch, UCI World Championships
National Championships

1st Team pursuit
2nd Points race

UCI Nations Cup

1st Elimination, Cairo
3rd Team pursuit, Jakarta

2024
1st Team pursuit, UCI Nations Cup, Adelaide
2nd Elimination, UEC European Championships
2025
UEC European Championships

2nd Team pursuit
3rd Scratch

2026
1st Team pursuit, Commonwealth Games
3rd Team pursuit, UEC European Championships
