= Yanne Dorenbos =

Dutch cyclist (born 2000)

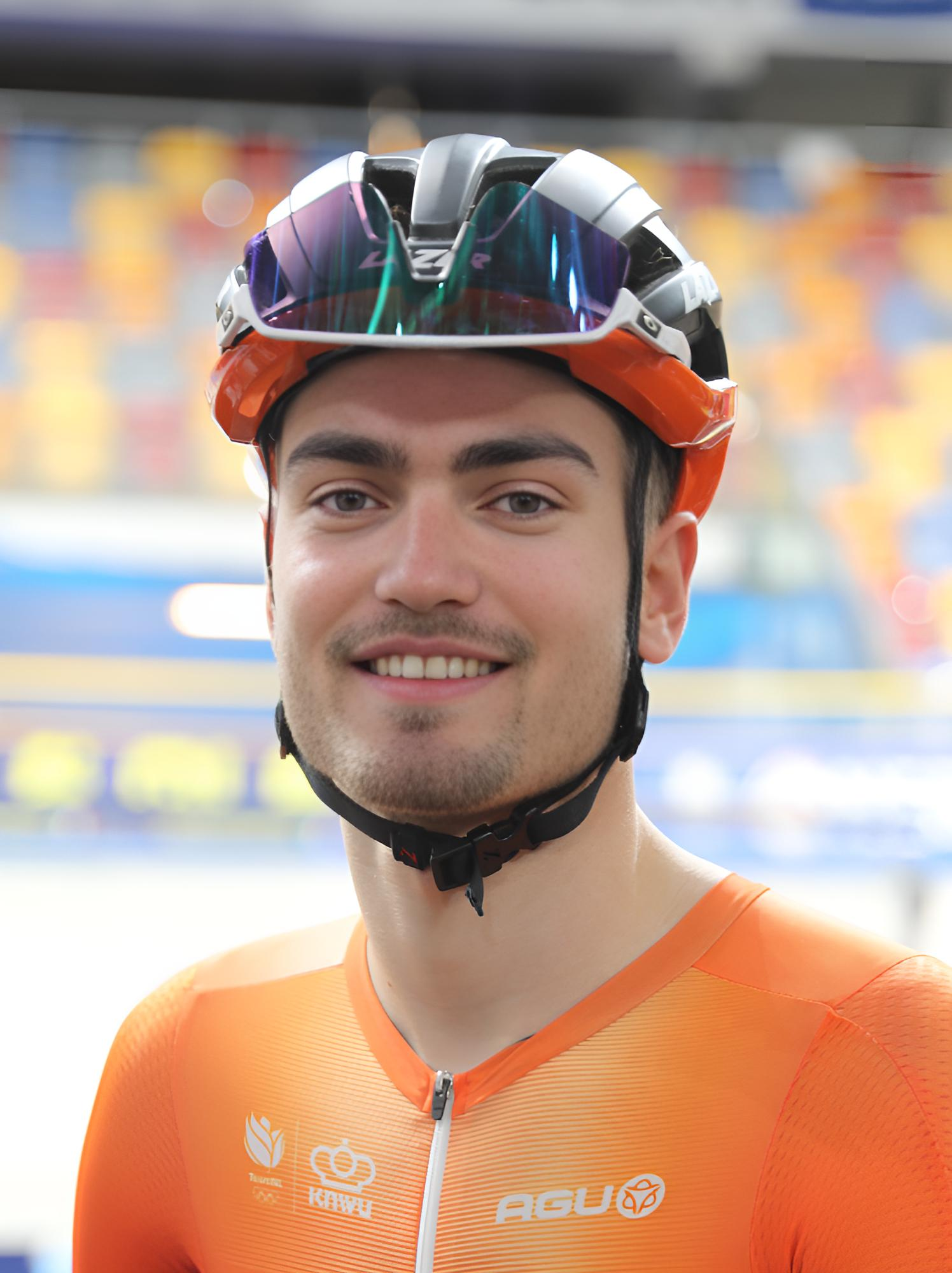
- Dorenbos in 2024

Personal information
- Born: 15 September 2000 (age 26) Castricum, Netherlands

Cycling career
- Sport: Cycling
- Current team: Azerion / Villa Valkenburg
- Disciplines: Road; Track

Amateur teams
- 2015–2020: UWTC De Volharding
- 2021: GRC Jan van Arckel
- 2022–2023: Lizarte

Professional teams
- 2023: Equipo Kern Pharma (stagiaire)
- 2024–: Parkhotel Valkenburg
Medal record
Men's track cycling
Representing the Netherlands
World Championships
Silver medal – second place	2025 Santiago	Scratch
Bronze medal – third place	2024 Ballerup	Omnium
European Championships
Gold medal – first place	2025 Heusden-Zolder	Madison
Silver medal – second place	2025 Heusden-Zolder	Points race
Silver medal – second place	2026 Konya	Omnium
U23 & Junior European Championships
Gold medal – first place	2022 Anadia	Under-23 madison
Gold medal – first place	2018 Aigle	Junior points race

Yanne Dorenbos (born 15 September 2000) is a Dutch professional cyclist, who currently rides for UCI Continental team Azerion / Villa Valkenburg.

== Career ==
Dorenbos is from Castricum, North Holland. He trained at the UWTC in Volharding. A versatile cyclist, he competes on the road and on the track

In December 2016, Dorenbos was crowned Dutch scratch champion in the junior category (under 19). The following year, he won the title of junior national champion in the omnium. He then became European champion in the junior points race in 2018. That same year, he finished seventh in a stage of the Sint-Martinusprijs Kontich and eighth in the time trial of the Ronde des vallées.

In 2019, Dorenbos made his debut in the espoir category (under 23). However, a calf injury hampered his progress. Frustrated, he was sidelined from competition for a year and a half. He finally got back on the bike in June 2021. A few months later, he took part in the Dutch track championships, where he came second in the elimination race and third in the points race.

During the 2022 season, Dorenbos distinguished himself by becoming European champion of the Madison U23, alongside his compatriot Philip Heijnen. On the road, he won a Belgian regional event as well as two races in the Basque Country, thanks to his sprinting skills. He also finished fourth in the Dutch U23 time trial championship, fifth in the Danny Jonckheere Memorial and ninth in the Grand Prix Criquielion.

In 2023, Dorenbos headed to Spain by joining the team Equipo Finisher, the reserve team of Equipo Kern Pharma. On 5 March, he triumphed in the Guerrita Trophy, a round of the Spanish Amateur Cup. Shortly after, he finished fourth in the elimination race and the omnium at the Cairo Velodrome, as part of the Nations Cup. The rest of his season was more disappointing. A victim of overtraining, he did not obtain any other notable results. However, the management of Kern Pharma offered him the opportunity to do an internship with the professional team. He thus joined the squad in August. Under his new colours, he took part in the Volta a Portugal and the Tour of Turkey. In December, he found good sensations on the track by winning two national champion titles, in the Madison and the scratch.

In 2024, Dorenbos returned to the Netherlands by signing a contract with the Parkhotel Valkenburg team, which competes at continental level.

== Major results ==
=== Track ===
2018
1st Points race, UEC European Junior Championships
2021
National Championships

2nd Elimination
3rd Points race

2022
1st Madison, UEC European Under-23 Championships (with Philip Heijnen)
National Championships

2nd Madison
3rd Points race

2023
National Championships

1st Madison (with Elmar Abma)
1st Scratch

2024
2nd Madison, Milton, UCI Nations Cup (with Jan-Willem van Schip)
3rd Omnium, UCI World Championships
2025
UEC European Championships

1st Madison (with Vincent Hoppezak)
3rd Points race

1st Omnium, UCI Nations Cup, Konya
2nd Scratch, UCI World Championships
2026
2nd Omnium, UEC European Championships

=== Road ===
2022
1st Prueba Alsasua
1st Andra Mari Sari Nagusia
1st Grand Prix Koen Barbé
9th Grand Prix Criquielion
2023
1st Trofeo Guerrita
