= Ilya Savekin =

Russian cyclist (born 2005)

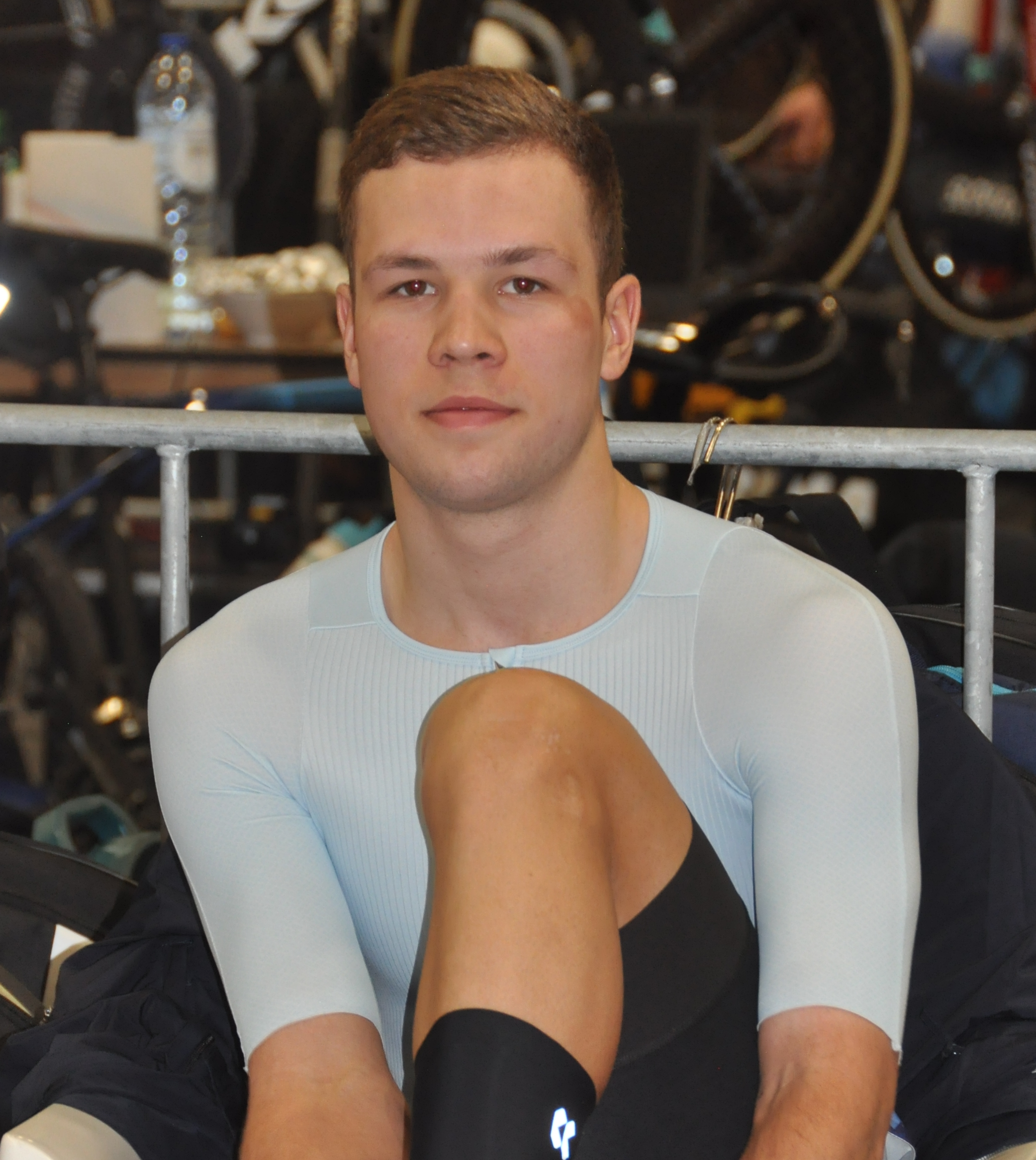
- Savekin in 2025

Personal information
- Born: 17 May 2005 (age 21) St Petersburg, Russia
- Height: 1.80 m (5 ft 11 in)
- Weight: 68 kg (150 lb)

Cycling career
- Sport: Cycling
- Disciplines: Track; Road
- Role: Rider

Amateur teams
- 2023: PC Baix Ebre
- 2024: Controlpack
- 2025: PC Baix Ebre
Medal record
Men's track cycling
Representing Individual Neutral Athletes
European Championships
Silver medal – second place	2026 Konya	Scratch
European U23 Championships
Silver medal – second place	2026 Cottbus	Scratch
Silver medal – second place	2026 Cottbus	Points race
Bronze medal – third place	2025 Anadia	Omnium

Ilya Sergeyevich Savekin (Russian: Илья Сергеевич Савекин; born 17 May 2005) is a Russian track cyclist. He competed at the 2026 UEC European Track Championships as a neural athlete, winning the silver medal in the men's scratch race.

== Career ==
A member of Peña Ciclista Baix Ebre, in April 2023 he won the Trofeu 15 d'Abril in Spain.

Riding in Spain for Controlpack, Savekin had a top-ten finish at the XIII Clásica de Valladolid-Memorial Ángel Lozano and Jesús Nieto in Valladolid in 2024. That year, he also won the Vila de Juneda Trophy.

Riding for Spanish team Technosylva Maglia Rower Bembibre, Savekin won in Vigo at the Spanish Elite-Sub23 Cup in May 2025. That year, he also won Gran Premio Industrie del Marmo.

On the track, he won the bronze medal in the omnium at the 2025 UEC European U23 Track Championships in Anadia, Portugal. Savekin was a silver medalist in the men's scratch race at the 2026 UEC European Track Championships in Konya, Turkey.

== Major results ==
=== Road ===
2023
1st Trofeu 15 d'Abril
1st Trofeu Enric Armengol Junior
2024
1st Gran Premi del Préssec
1st Trofeu Sant Jaume dels Domenys
1st Trofeu Vila de Juneda
1st Volta al Montsiá
1st Clàssica La Tinença
2025
1st Gran Premio Industrie del Marmo
1st Coppa Ciuffenna
1st Medaglia d'Oro Frare De Nardi
1st Stages 1 & 2 Taça de Portugal de Esperanças
7th Milano–Rapallo

=== Track ===
2025
3rd Omnium, European Under-23 Championships
2026
2nd Scratch, European Championships
