= Vincent Hoppezak =

Dutch cyclist (born 1999)

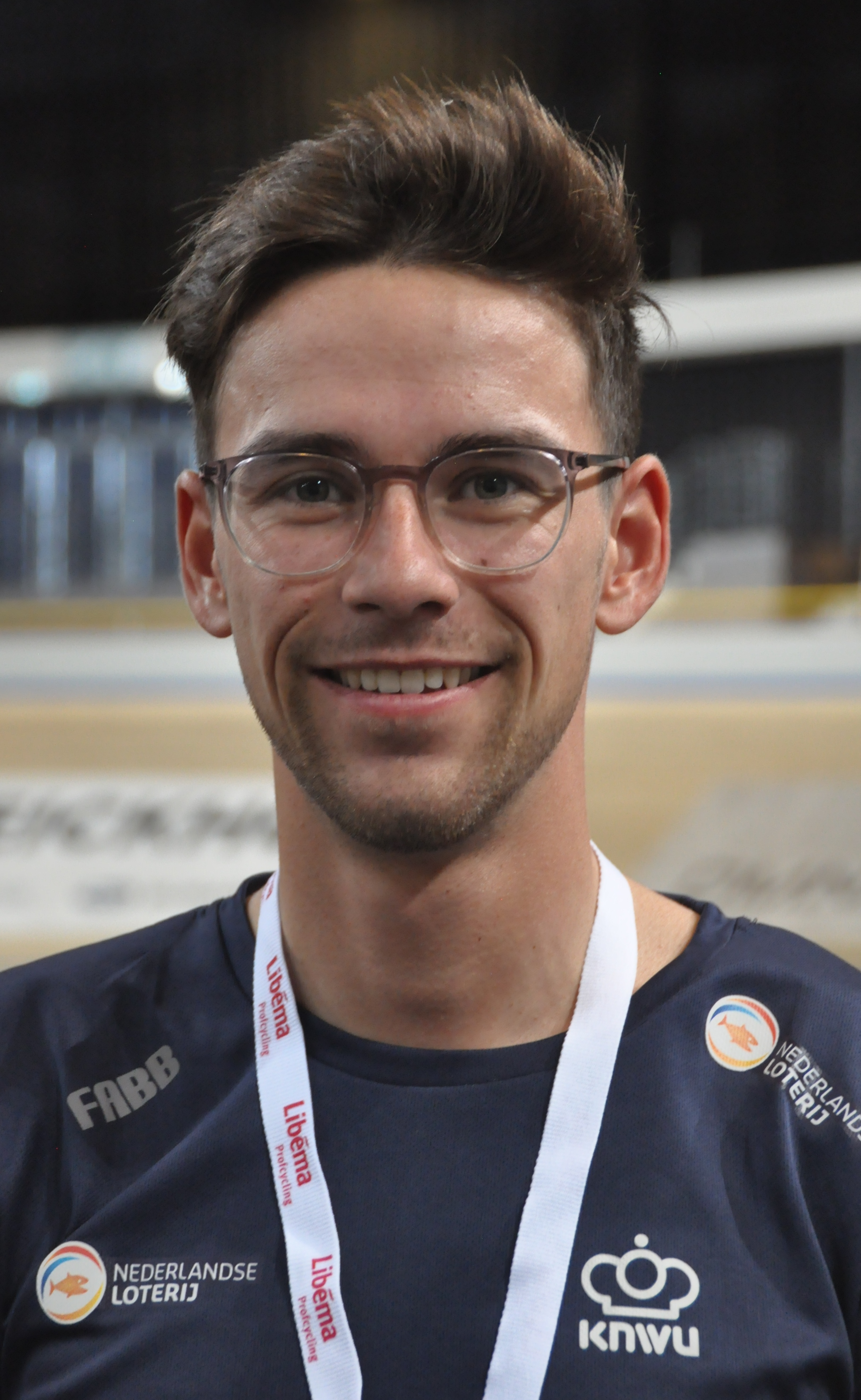
- Hoppezak in 2021

Personal information
- Born: 2 February 1999 (age 27) Capelle aan den IJssel, Netherlands

Cycling career
- Sport: Cycling
- Current team: BEAT CC p/b Saxo
- Disciplines: Track; Road
- Role: Rider

Amateur teams
- 2017: RWC Ahoy Rotterdam
- 2020: WP Groot Amsterdam
- 2021: ASC Olympia

Professional teams
- 2018: Delta Cycling Rotterdam
- 2022–: BEAT Cycling
Medal record
Men's track cycling
Representing the Netherlands
World Championships
Bronze medal – third place	2021 Roubaix	Points race
European Championships
Gold medal – first place	2025 Heusden-Zolder	Madison
Silver medal – second place	2021 Grenchen	Scratch
Silver medal – second place	2025 Heusden-Zolder	Scratch
Bronze medal – third place	2022 Munich	Points race
Bronze medal – third place	2026 Konya	Scratch

Vincent Hoppezak (born 2 February 1999) is a Dutch road and track cyclist, who currently rides for UCI Continental team BEAT CC p/b Saxo. He won the silver medal in the Scratch at the 2021 UEC European Track Championships.

== Major results ==
=== Track ===
2016
National Junior Championships

1st Omnium
1st Kilo
2nd Scratch
3rd Individual pursuit

2019
1st Team pursuit, National Championships
2021
2nd Scratch, UEC European Championships
3rd Points race, UCI World Championships
3rd Madison, UEC European Under-23 Championships (with Philip Heijnen)
2022
1st Omnium, National Championships
3rd Points race, UEC European Championships
3rd Six Days of Rotterdam (with Elia Viviani)
2025
UEC European Championships

1st Madison (with Yanne Dorenbos)
2nd Scratch

2nd Madison, UCI Nations Cup, Konya (with Yoeri Havik)

=== Road ===
2016
4th Overall La Coupe du Président de la Ville de Grudziądz

1st Stage 1b
