= Tim Torn Teutenberg =

German cyclist

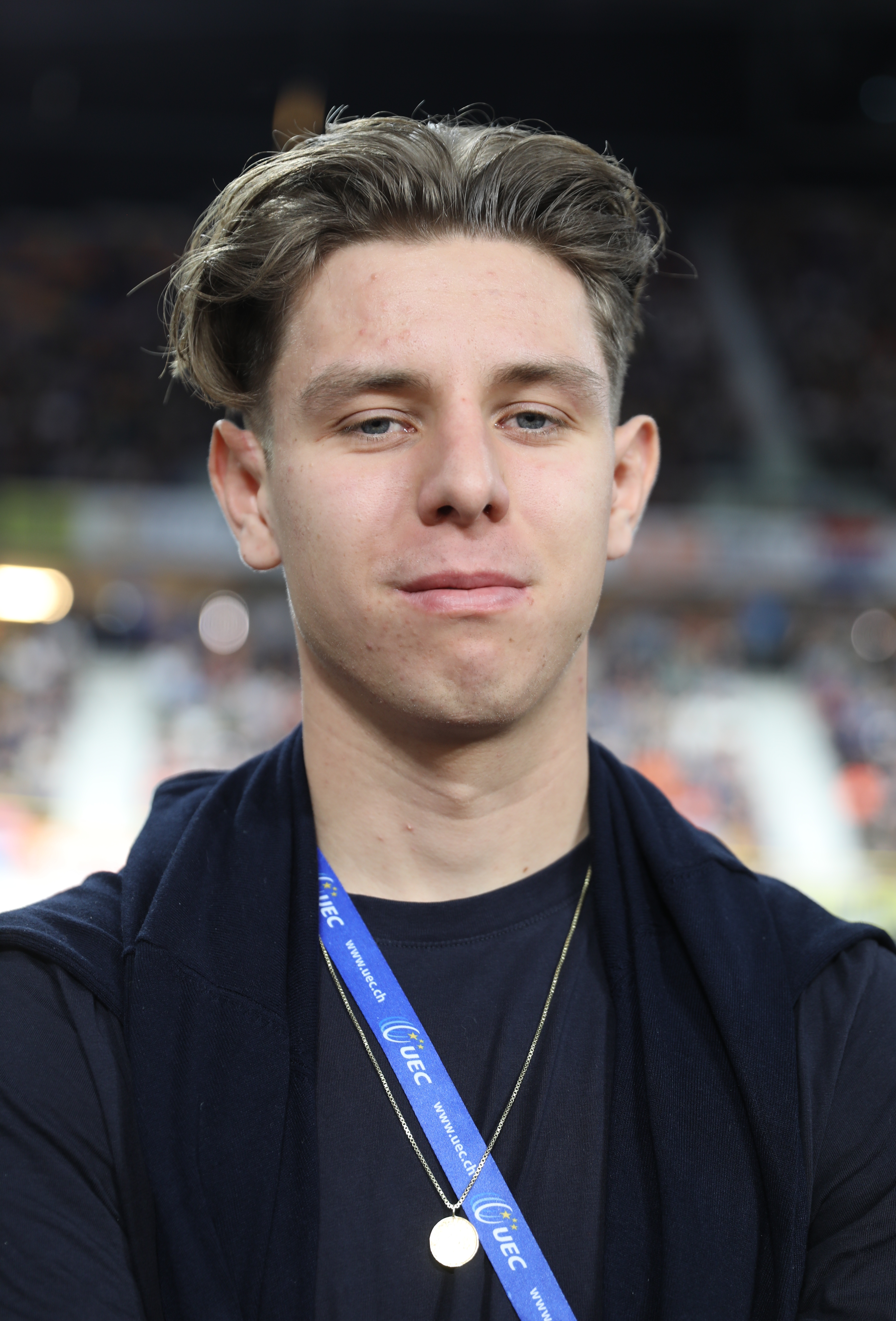
- Teutenberg in 2024

Personal information
- Born: 19 June 2002 (age 24) Mettmann, Germany
- Height: 1.83 m (6 ft 0 in)

Cycling career
- Sport: Cycling
- Current team: Lidl–Trek
- Disciplines: Road; Track
- Role: Rider

Amateur team
- 2011–2020: FC Lexxi Speedbike

Professional teams
- 2021–2023: Leopard Pro Cycling
- 2023: Trek–Segafredo (stagiaire)
- 2024: Lidl–Trek Future Racing
- 2025–: Lidl–Trek

Major wins
- Track World Championships Madison (2024) Elimination (2026)
Medal record
Men's track cycling
Representing Germany
World Championships
| Gold medal – first place | 2024 Ballerup | Madison |
| Gold medal – first place | 2026 Shanghai | Elimination |
| Bronze medal – third place | 2024 Ballerup | Team pursuit |
| Bronze medal – third place | 2026 Shanghai | Omnium |
European Championships
| Gold medal – first place | 2023 Grenchen | Elimination |
| Gold medal – first place | 2025 Heusden-Zolder | Omnium |
| Gold medal – first place | 2025 Heusden-Zolder | Elimination |
| Gold medal – first place | 2026 Konya | Points race |
| Silver medal – second place | 2025 Heusden-Zolder | Madison |
| Silver medal – second place | 2026 Konya | Elimination |

Tim Torn Teutenberg (born 19 June 2002) is a German cyclist, who currently rides for UCI WorldTeam Lidl–Trek.

He is from a family of cyclists: His father Lars, uncle Sven, aunt Ina-Yoko and sister Lea Lin are all current or former professional cyclists.

== Major results ==
=== Road ===
2019
2nd Overall Tour de Gironde

1st Young rider classification

9th Overall Internationale Cottbuser Junioren-Etappenfahrt
2022
4th Overall Orlen Nations Grand Prix
4th Midden–Brabant Poort Omloop
6th Kattekoers
8th Overall Le Triptyque des Monts et Chateaux
8th Ronde van Overijssel
9th Overall Olympia's Tour
9th Visit Friesland Elfsteden Race
2023
2nd Road race, National Under-23 Championships
2nd Ronde van Overijssel
6th Road race, UEC European Under-23 Championships
2024
1st Time Trial, National Under-23 Championships
1st Overall Olympia's Tour

1st Points classification
1st Young rider classification

1st Paris–Roubaix Espoirs
Tour de Bretagne

1st Points classification
1st Stage 1

1st Stage 1 Flèche du Sud
3rd Clàssica Comunitat Valenciana 1969
3rd Youngster Coast Challenge
4th Trofeo Palma
5th Road race, National Championships
7th Trofeo Ses Salines–Felanitx
7th Ster van Zwolle
2025
3rd Surf Coast Classic
9th Ronde van Limburg
9th Gooikse Pijl
9th Binche–Chimay–Binche
2026 (1 pro win)
1st Philadelphia Cycling Classic
5th Flandrien 0.0 Classic

=== Track ===
2019
UEC European Junior Championships

1st Elimination
3rd Madison (with Luca Dreßler)

National Junior Championships

1st Omnium
1st Madison (with Luca Dreßler)

2nd Elimination, UCI World Junior Championships
2020
UEC European Junior Championships

2nd Omnium
3rd Madison (with Benjamin Boos)

2021
2nd Elimination, UEC European Under-23 Championships
2022
National Championships

1st Omnium
1st Scratch
1st Elimination

UEC European Under-23 Championships

2nd Omnium
2nd Elimination
3rd Madison (with Malte Maschke)

UCI Nations Cup

3rd Elimination, Glasgow
3rd Elimination, Milton

2023
1st Elimination, UEC European Championships
UEC European Under-23 Championships

1st Omnium
1st Elimination
3rd Madison (with Benjamin Boos)

2nd Omnium, UCI Nations Cup, Milton
2024
UCI World Championships

1st Madison (with Roger Kluge)
3rd Team pursuit

2025
UEC European Championships

1st Elimination
1st Omnium
2nd Madison (with Roger Kluge)

2026
UEC European Championships

1st Points race
2nd Elimination
