= Diogo Narciso =

Portuguese cyclist (born 2001)

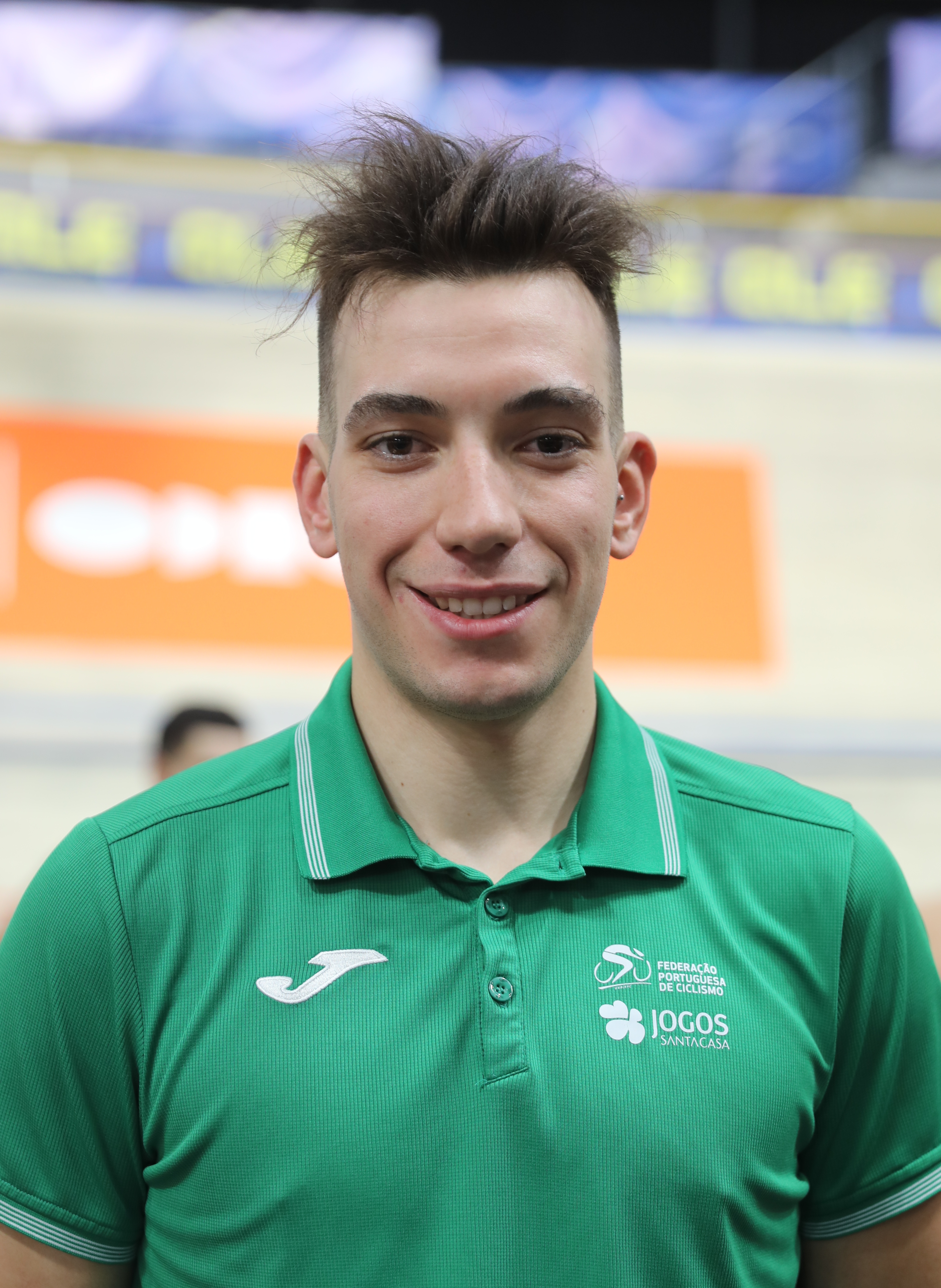
- Narciso at the 2024 UEC European Track Championships

Personal information
- Born: 19 November 2001 (age 24) Gondomar, Portugal
- Height: 1.80 m (5 ft 11 in)
- Weight: 72 kg (159 lb)

Cycling career
- Sport: Cycling
- Current team: Credibom / LA Alumínios / Marcos Car
- Disciplines: Track; Road
- Role: Rider

Amateur teams
- 2019: Bairrada Cycling Team
- 2020–2021: Sicasal–Torres Vedras

Professional team
- 2022–: LA Alumínios / Credibom / Marcos Car
Medal record
Men's track cycling
Representing Portugal
European Championships
Silver medal – second place	2026 Konya	Madison
European Under-23 Championships
Silver medal – second place	2021 Apeldoorn	Points race
Silver medal – second place	2022 Anadia	Points race
Silver medal – second place	2023 Anadia	Scratch

Diogo Narciso (born 19 November 2001) is a Portuguese road and track cyclist, who currently rides for UCI Continental team Credibom / LA Alumínios / Marcos Car. He won a silver medal in the Madison at the 2026 UEC European Track Championships alongside Iúri Leitão. He also previously won three silver medals at the European Under-23 Championships between 2021 and 2023.

== Major results ==
=== Road ===
2025
1st Stage 2 Grande Prémio Jornal de Notícias
