= Jules Hesters =

Belgian cyclist (born 1998)

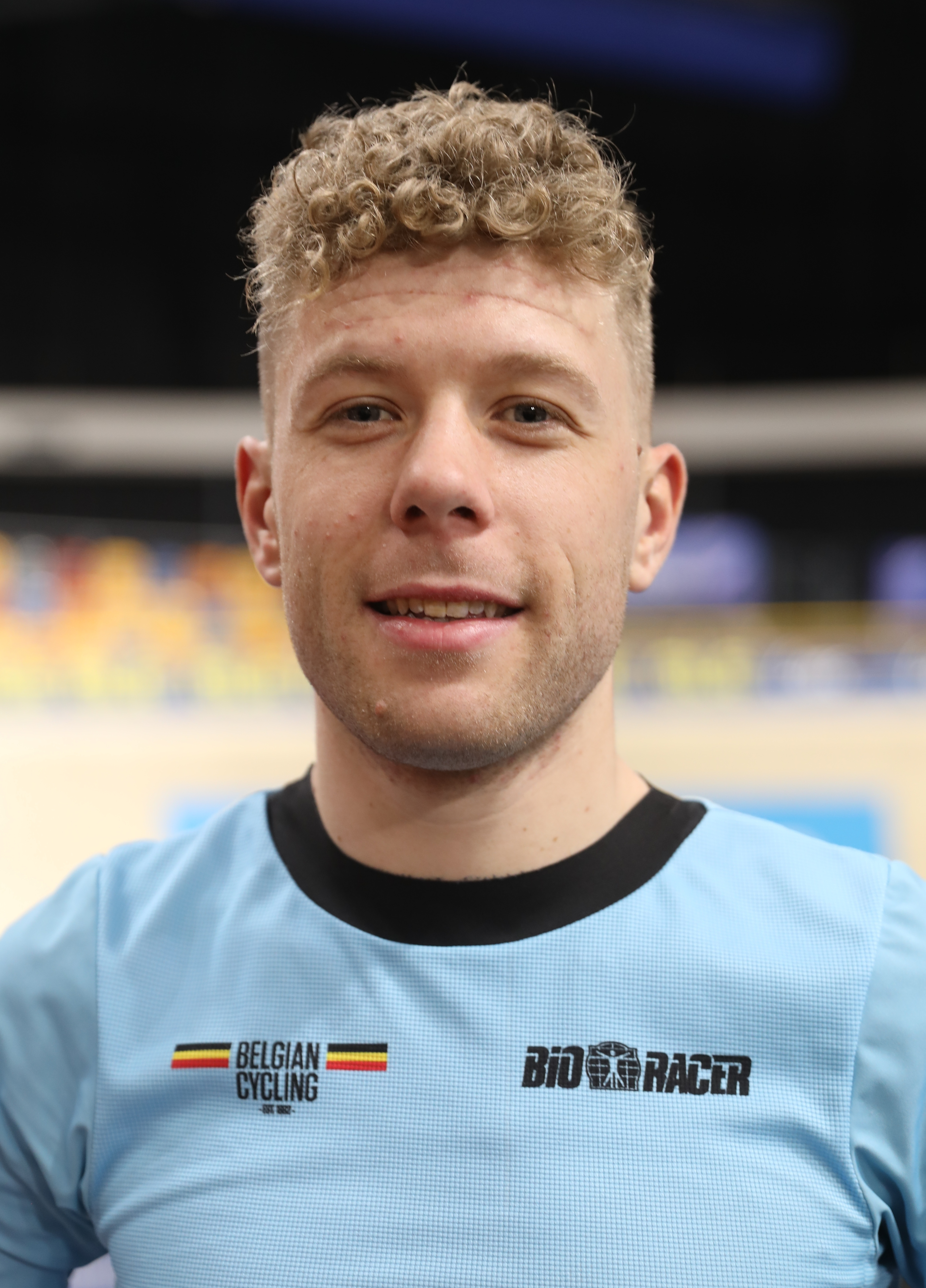
- Hesters (2024)

Personal information
- Born: 11 November 1998 (age 27) Ghent, Belgium
- Height: 1.80 m (5 ft 11 in)
- Weight: 72 kg (159 lb)

Cycling career
- Sport: Cycling
- Current team: Team Flanders–Baloise
- Disciplines: Road; Track
- Role: Rider

Amateur teams
- 2017–2018: VDM Van Durme–Michiels–Trawobo
- 2019–2020: EFC–L & R–Vulsteke

Professional teams
- 2021: BEAT Cycling
- 2022–: Sport Vlaanderen–Baloise
Medal record
Men's track cycling
Representing Belgium
World Championships
Bronze medal – third place	2026 Shanghai	Elimination
European Championships
Bronze medal – third place	2022 Munich	Elimination
Bronze medal – third place	2024 Apeldoorn	Elimination
Bronze medal – third place	2025 Heusden-Zolder	Elimination
Bronze medal – third place	2026 Konya	Elimination
Bronze medal – third place	2026 Konya	Madison

Jules Hesters (born 11 November 1998) is a Belgian track and road cyclist, who currently rides for UCI ProTeam Team Flanders–Baloise.

== Major results ==
=== Track ===
2015
National Junior Championships

1st Madison (with Arne De Groote)
1st Scratch

2016
UEC European Junior Championships

1st Scratch
2nd Madison (with Gerben Thijssen)

2017
National Championships

1st Keirin
3rd Madison

2018
UEC European Under-23 Championships

1st Elimination
2nd Madison (with Bryan Boussaer)

National Championships

2nd Madison (with Fabio Van Den Bossche)
3rd Omnium

2019
1st Elimination, UEC European Under-23 Championships
National Championships

1st Derny
3rd Madison (with Fabio Van Den Bossche)
3rd Points

2020
1st Elimination, UEC European Under-23 Championships
2022
2nd Six Days of Rotterdam (with Lindsay De Vylder)
3rd Elimination, UEC European Championships
2023
3rd Six Days of Ghent (with Fabio Van den Bossche)
2024
3rd Elimination, UEC European Championships
3rd Six Days of Ghent (with Aaron Gate)
2025
UCI Nations Cup, Konya

1st Elimination
3rd Madison (with Noah Vandenbranden)

2nd Six Days of Ghent (with Yoeri Havik)
3rd Elimination, UEC European Championships
2026
3rd Elimination, UEC European Championships
3rd Madison, UEC European Championships (with Jasper De Buyst)

National Championships

1st scratch
1st omnium
1st pointsrace
1st madison (with Jasper De Buyst)

=== Road ===
2019
7th De Kustpijl
2020
2nd Gent–Staden
4th Road race, National Under-23 Championships
2021
3rd Omloop der Kempen
7th Grote Prijs Marcel Kint
2022
1st Grote Prijs Beeckman-De Caluwé
8th Clásica de Almería
2023
4th Dorpenomloop Rucphen
2024
10th Kampioenschap van Vlaanderen
2026
1st Grand Prix de la Ville de Lillers
6th Gooikse Pijl
