= Ramazan Yılmaz =

Turkish track & road cyclist (born 2005)

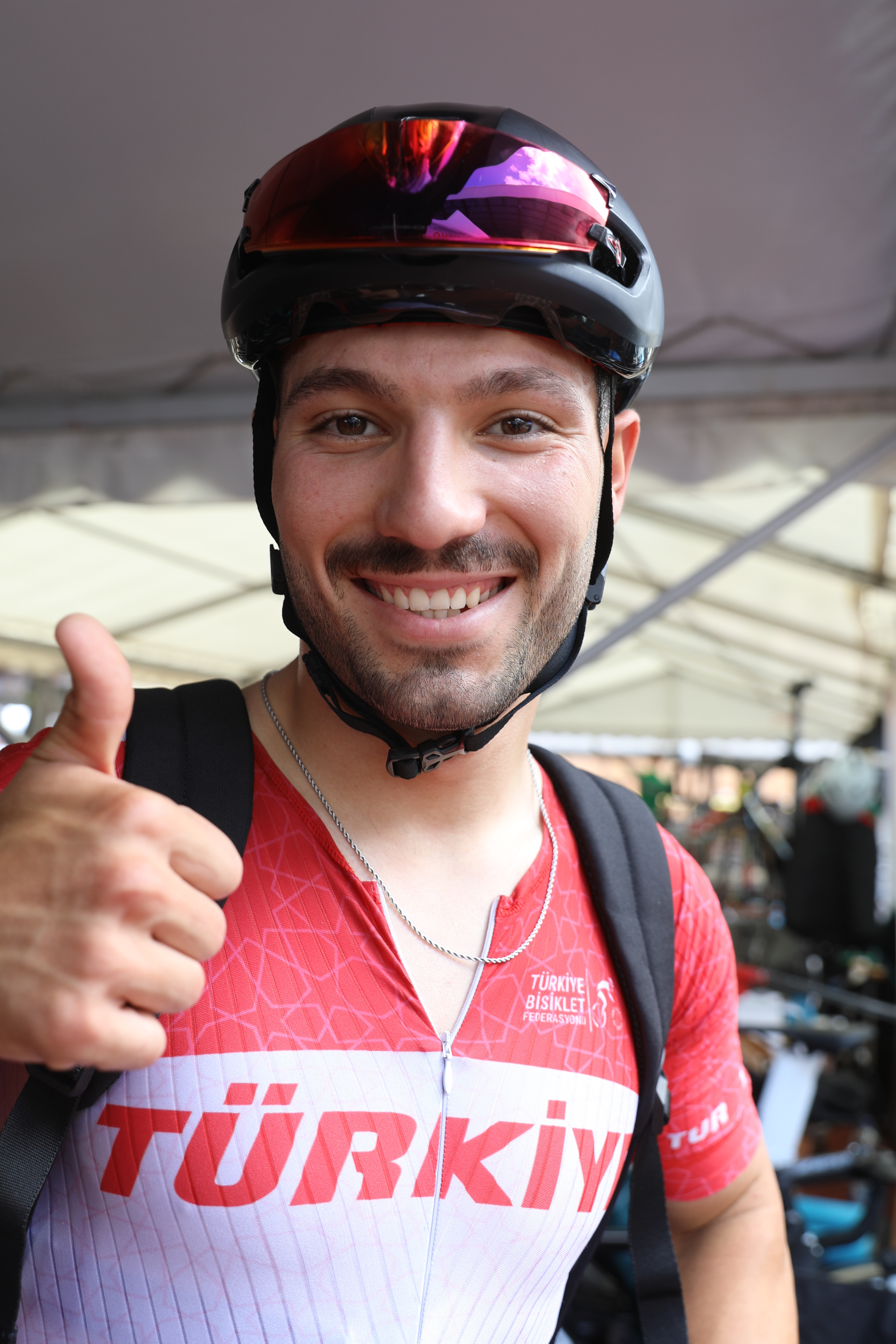
- Ramazan Yılmaz (2026)

Personal information
- Born: 24 January 2005 (age 21) Çumra, Konya, Turkey
- Height: 1.74 m (5 ft 8 1/2 in)
- Weight: 65 kg (143 lb)

Cycling career
- Sport: Cycling
- Current team: Konya Büyükşehir Belediyespor
- Disciplines: Road; Track
- Role: Rider
- Rider type: All-rounder

Amateur teams
- 2023: Konya BB U19
- 2024: Adria Mobil
- 2025: Konya BB

Ramazan Yılmaz (born 24 January 2005) is a Turkish cyclist. He is part of the Turkey men's national cycling team.

== Early years and career ==
Ramazan Yılmaz was born on 24 January 2005. He is a native of Çumra in Konya Province, central Turkey. He used to ride to school in his hometown by bicycle in summer and winter. He decided to take up cycling in 2017 when cyclists training on the roads on his way to school impressed him. In November 2017, he joined his local cycling team Çatalhöyük Çumra Belediyespor. There, he was coached by İsmail Uğurlu. He competed for the first time at national level in 2018, and placed fourth at the Turkish Championship Season Opening Race in Arsuz, Hatay. Following this, he always reached the podium in the races he competed in.

He then joined Konya Büyükşehir Belediyespor. He competes in road snd track events, and trains five hours a day.

He won the silver medal in the junior category at the Troféu Internacional de Pista Artur Lopes in Anadia, Portugal in January 2023. This became Turkey's first medal at a track competition after five years. In July 2023, he won the silver medal in the Scratch race, and the bronze medal in the Points race event of the junior category at the UEC European Track Championships (U23 & junior) in Anadia, Portugal. He was promoted to the Elite category in 2023.

In 2024, Yılmaz transferred to the Sloven team Adria Mobil to start in the first race of the season for his new team at the Tour of Antalya in Turkey.

He returned to his former team Konya Büyükşehir Belediyespor in the 2025 season. He was entitled to participste at the 2025 UCI Track Cycling Nations Cup in the Konya Velodrome in Turkey in March 2025 as a result of points he had collected. He competed in the final of the Elimination race event, and placed 16th among 24. In the same month, he won the gold medal at the 56 km (35 mi)-long 2025 International Apollon Temple Criterium, and the gold medal in the U23 category as well as the silver medal at the 130 km (81 mi)-long Grand Prix Apollon Temple in Side, Antalya, Turkey.

== Major results ==
2022

- 2nd Junior Turkish National Road Race Championships,

2023

- 2nd Junior Troféu Internacional de Pista Artur Lopes, Anadia, Portugal,
- 2nd Junior UEC European Track Championships (U23 & junior) Scratch race,
- 3rd Junior UEC European Track Championships (U23 & junior) Points race,

2024

- 3rd National Championships Turkey - ITT
- 2nd Grand Prix Praha 500+1 kolo: Embedded UCI races Scratch race,
- 2nd Grand Prix Praha Elimination race,

2025

- 1st Turkish Cycling Cup I Criterium
- 1st International Apollon Temple Criterium, Side, Turkey,
- 1st U23 Grand Prix Apollon Temple, Side, Turkey,
- 2nd Grand Prix Apollon Temple, Side, Turkey,
- 1st International Kleopatra Beach Criterium, Antalya, Turkey,
- 2nd Grand Prix Antalya
