= Tobias Hansen =

Danish cyclist (born 2002)

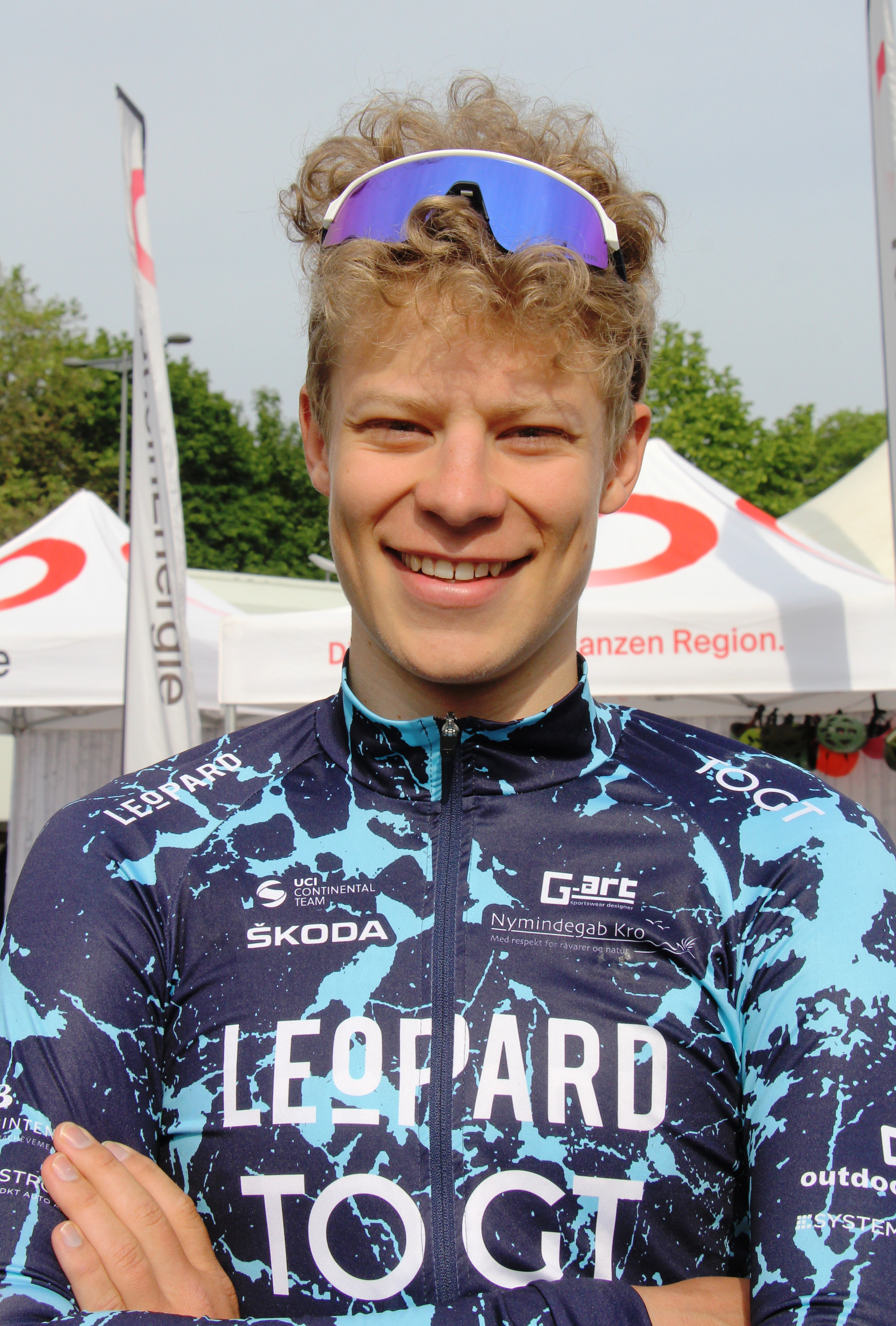
- Hansen at the 2023 Rund um Köln

Personal information
- Full name: Tobias Aagaard Hansen
- Born: 10 March 2002 (age 24) Odense, Denmark

Cycling career
- Sport: Cycling
- Current team: Team ColoQuick
- Disciplines: Track, road
- Role: Rider

Professional teams
- 2021–2022: Uno-X Dare Development Team
- 2023: Leopard TOGT Pro Cycling
- 2024: BHS–PL Beton Bornholm
- 2025–: Team ColoQuick

Major wins
- Track World Championships Elimination (2024) Team pursuit (2024, 2025, 2026)
Medal record
Men's track cycling
Representing Denmark
World Championships
Gold medal – first place	2024 Ballerup	Team pursuit
Gold medal – first place	2024 Ballerup	Elimination
Gold medal – first place	2025 Santiago	Team pursuit
Gold medal – first place	2026 Shanghai	Team pursuit
Silver medal – second place	2024 Ballerup	Scratch
Silver medal – second place	2026 Shanghai	Elimination
Bronze medal – third place	2022 Saint-Quentin-en-Yvelines	Team pursuit
European Championships
Gold medal – first place	2021 Grenchen	Team pursuit
Gold medal – first place	2024 Apeldoorn	Elimination
Gold medal – first place	2025 Heusden-Zolder	Team pursuit
Gold medal – first place	2026 Konya	Elimination
Gold medal – first place	2026 Konya	Team pursuit
Silver medal – second place	2022 Munich	Team pursuit
Silver medal – second place	2024 Apeldoorn	Team pursuit
Bronze medal – third place	2024 Apeldoorn	Scratch

Tobias Aagaard Hansen (born 10 March 2002) is a Danish road and track cyclist, who currently rides for UCI Continental team Team ColoQuick.

== Career ==
He was part of the team that won the team pursuit at the 2021 UEC European Track Championships.

He joined his first full UCI Conti team in 2023, Leopard TOGT Pro Cycling.

== Major results ==
=== Track ===
2019
2nd Scratch, National Championships
2020
UEC European Junior Championships

1st Elimination
3rd Points race

2nd Madison, National Championships (with Julius Johansen)
2021
1st Team pursuit, UEC European Championships
National Championships

1st Omnium
2nd Points race

UCI Nations Cup

2nd Team pursuit, Hong Kong

2022
1st Omnium, National Championships
2nd Team pursuit, UEC European Championships
3rd Team pursuit, UCI World Championships
UCI Nations Cup

3rd Team pursuit, Glasgow

2023
1st Omnium, National Championships
UCI Nations Cup

1st Omnium, Jakarta
1st Team pursuit, Jakarta
1st Team pursuit, Cairo

UCI Champions League

3rd Scratch, Berlin
3rd Scratch, London I

2024
UCI World Championships

1st Team pursuit
1st Elimination
2nd Scratch

UEC European Championships

1st Elimination
2nd Team pursuit

UCI Nations Cup

1st Team pursuit, Hong Kong

UCI Champions League

1st Scratch, Apeldoorn I
1st Elimination, Apeldoorn II
2nd Elimination, Apeldoorn I

1st Six Days of Rotterdam (with Michael Mørkøv)
2025
1st Team pursuit, UCI World Championships
1st Team pursuit, UEC European Championships
2026
1st Team pursuit, UCI World Championships

=== Road ===
2022
1st Stage 3 Baltic Chain Tour
2024
3rd Fyen Rundt
7th Grand Prix Herning
10th Paris–Troyes
2025
10th Arno Wallaard Memorial
