= Cycling at the 2018 Commonwealth Games – Men's scratch race =

Cycling Track – Men's scratch race at the 2018 Commonwealth Games
- Venue: Anna Meares Velodrome
- Dates: 7 April 2018
- Competitors: 34 from 13 nations

Medalists
gold medal	Sam Welsford	Australia
silver medal	Campbell Stewart	New Zealand
bronze medal	Christopher Latham	England

The Men's scratch race at the 2018 Commonwealth Games, as part of the cycling programme, took place on 7 April 2018.

== Schedule ==
The schedule was as follows:

All times are Australian Eastern Standard Time (UTC+10)

Date	Time	Round
Saturday 7 April 2018	15:21	Qualifying Heat 1
Saturday 7 April 2018	16:10	Qualifying Heat 2
Saturday 7 April 2018	21:47/22:03	Finals

== Results ==
=== Qualification ===
First 12 riders in each heat qualify to final.

Heat 1

Rank	Rider	Laps down	Notes
1	John Archibald (SCO)		Q
2	Ethan Hayter (ENG)		Q
3	Sam Welsford (AUS)		Q
4	Cameron Meyer (AUS)		Q
5	Jon Mould (WAL)		Q
6	Nicholas Kergozou (NZL)	–1	Q
7	Dylan Kennett (NZL)	–1	Q
8	Rhys Britton (WAL)	–1	Q
9	Mark Stewart (SCO)	–1	Q
10	Aidan Caves (CAN)	–1	Q
11	Xeno Young (NIR)	–1	Q
12	Marc Potts (NIR)	–1	Q
13	Muhamad Afiq Hunzie Othman (MAS)	–1	
14	Adam Jamieson (CAN)	–1	
15	Nolan Hoffman (RSA)	–1	
	Oshane Williams (JAM)	DNF	
	Stephen Belle (SEY)	DNF	

Heat 2

Rank	Rider	Laps down	Notes
1	Christopher Latham (ENG)		Q
2	Oliver Wood (ENG)		Q
3	Leigh Howard (AUS)		Q
4	Mark Downey (NIR)		Q
5	Joe Holt (WAL)		Q
6	Campbell Stewart (NZL)		Q
7	Matthew Bostock (IOM)		Q
8	David Maree (RSA)		Q
9	Michael Foley (CAN)		Q
10	Kyle Gordon (SCO)		Q
11	Eiman Firdaus Mohd Zamri (MAS)		Q
12	Matthew Draper (IOM)		Q
	Manjeet Singh (IND)		
	Irwandie Lakasek (MAS)	DNF	
	Joshua Van Wyk (RSA)	DNF	
	Christopher Gerry (SEY)	DNF	

=== Final ===
Rank	Rider	Laps down
1st place, gold medalist(s)	Sam Welsford (AUS)	
2nd place, silver medalist(s)	Campbell Stewart (NZL)	
3rd place, bronze medalist(s)	Christopher Latham (ENG)	
4	Oliver Wood (ENG)	
5	Ethan Hayter (ENG)	
6	Matthew Bostock (IOM)	
7	Mark Stewart (SCO)	
8	John Archibald (SCO)	
9	Jon Mould (WAL)	
10	Cameron Meyer (AUS)	
11	Kyle Gordon (SCO)	
12	Mark Downey (NIR)	
13	David Maree (RSA)	
14	Rhys Britton (WAL)	
15	Dylan Kennett (NZL)	
16	Joe Holt (WAL)	–1
17	Nicholas Kergozou (NZL)	–1
	Leigh Howard (AUS)	DNF
	Aidan Caves (CAN)	DNF
	Michael Foley (CAN)	DNF
	Matthew Draper (IOM)	DNF
	Eiman Firdaus Mohd Zamri (MAS)	DNF
	Marc Potts (NIR)	DNF
	Xeno Young (NIR)	DNF
