= Cycling at the 2018 Commonwealth Games – Men's points race =

Cycling Track – Men's points race at the 2018 Commonwealth Games
- Venue: Anna Meares Velodrome
- Dates: 8 April
- Competitors: 31 from 12 nations
- Winning points: 81

Medalists
gold medal	Mark Stewart	Scotland
silver medal	Campbell Stewart	New Zealand
bronze medal	Ethan Hayter	England

The men's points race at the 2018 Commonwealth Games, as part of the cycling programme, took place on 8 April 2018.

== Schedule ==
The schedule was as follows:

All times are Australian Eastern Standard Time (UTC+10)

Date	Time	Round
Sunday 8 April 2018	17:47	Qualifying
Sunday 8 April 2018	21:01	Final

== Results ==
=== Qualifying ===
60 laps (15 km) were raced with 6 sprints. The top 12 per heat advanced to the finals.

Heat 1

Rank	Rider	Lap points	Sprint points	Total points	Notes
1	Ethan Hayter (ENG)	20	5	25	Q
2	Samuel Harrison (WAL)	20	5	25	Q
3	Jay Lamoureux (CAN)	20	2	22	Q
4	Tom Sexton (NZL)		12	12	Q
5	Leigh Howard (AUS)		10	10	Q
6	Mark Stewart (SCO)		8	8	Q
7	Christopher Latham (ENG)		8	8	Q
8	Jon Mould (WAL)		7	7	Q
9	Matthew Bostock (IOM)		7	7	Q
10	David Maree (RSA)		5	5	Q
11	Kyle Gordon (SCO)		3	3	Q
12	Muhamad Afiq Hunzie Othman (MAS)		3	3	Q
13	Mark Downey (NIR)		2	2	
14	Matthew Draper (IOM)		0	0	
15	Derek Gee (CAN)		0	0	
–	Muhammad Nur Aiman Rosli (MAS)	DNF			

Heat 2

Rank	Rider	Lap points	Sprint points	Total points	Notes
1	Oliver Wood (ENG)	20	8	28	Q
2	Regan Gough (NZL)	20	8	28	Q
3	Joe Holt (WAL)	20	7	27	Q
4	Cameron Meyer (AUS)	20	5	25	Q
5	John Archibald (SCO)	20	4	24	Q
6	Steven van Heerden (RSA)	20	3	23	Q
7	Muhammad Danie Al Edy Suhaidee (MAS)	20	0	20	Q
8	Nolan Hoffman (RSA)		12	12	Q
9	Campbell Stewart (NZL)		9	9	Q
10	Kelland O'Brien (AUS)		8	8	Q
11	Michael Foley (CAN)		5	5	Q
12	Marc Potts (NIR)		5	5	Q
13	Xeno Young (NIR)		3	3	
14	Manjeet Singh (IND)		0	0	
–	Oshane Williams (JAM)	DNF			

=== Final ===
160 laps (40 km) were raced with 16 sprints.

Rank	Rider	Lap points	Sprint points	Total points
1st place, gold medalist(s)	Mark Stewart (SCO)	60	21	81
2nd place, silver medalist(s)	Campbell Stewart (NZL)	40	29	69
3rd place, bronze medalist(s)	Ethan Hayter (ENG)	40	28	68
4	Cameron Meyer (AUS)	40	10	50
5	Christopher Latham (ENG)	40	10	50
6	Oliver Wood (ENG)	40	6	46
7	Jon Mould (WAL)	40	5	45
8	Kelland O'Brien (AUS)	20	25	45
9	Regan Gough (NZL)	40	3	43
10	Tom Sexton (NZL)	40	3	43
11	John Archibald (SCO)	20	9	29
12	Marc Potts (NIR)		7	7
13	Joe Holt (WAL)		6	6
14	Matthew Bostock (IOM)		3	3
15	Muhammad Danie Al Edy Suhaidee (MAS)		2	2
16	Jay Lamoureux (CAN)		2	2
17	Muhamad Afiq Hunzie Othman (MAS)		1	1
18	Steven van Heerden (RSA)		0	0
19	Samuel Harrison (WAL)		0	0
20	Kyle Gordon (SCO)	-40	3	-37
21	Leigh Howard (AUS)	-40	2	-38
–	David Maree (RSA)	DNF		
–	Nolan Hoffman (RSA)	DNF		
–	Michael Foley (CAN)	DNF		
