= 2012 European Track Championships – Men's points race =

UEC European Champion jersey

The Men's points race was held on 19 October 2012. 25 riders participated, the heat distance was 20 kilometres (12.4 miles) – or 80 laps – with a sprint every 10 laps for extra points and the final distance was 40 kilometres (24.9 miles) – or 160 laps. A lap gained 20 points.

== Medalists ==
Gold	Elia Viviani (ITA)
Silver	Kirill Sveshnikov (RUS)
Bronze	Sergiy Lagkuti (UKR)

== Results ==
=== Heats ===
The 10 best riders advanced to the final. The races were held at 14:55.

==== Heat 1 ====
Rank	Name	Nation	Sprint points	Lap points	Final sprint	Total points
1	Ivan Savitskiy	Russia	11	0	1	11
2	Sergiy Lagkuti	Ukraine	11	0	6	11
3	Maximilian Beyer	Germany	10	0	8	10
4	Ingmar De Poortere	Belgium	10	0	9	10
5	Bryan Coquard	France	9	0	10	9
6	Liam Bertazzo	Italy	8	0	3	8
7	Jiří Hochmann	Czech Republic	8	0	11	8
8	Théry Schir	Switzerland	6	0	2	6
9	Andreas Graf	Austria	6	0	5	6
10	Mateusz Nowaczek	Poland	4	0	7	4
11	Ilia Koshevoy	Belarus	3	0	4	3
–	Eerik Idarand	Estonia	0	−20	0	DNF
–	Šarūnas Kuncevičius	Lithuania	2	−20	0	DNF

==== Heat 2 ====
Rank	Name	Nation	Sprint points	Lap points	Final sprint	Total points
1	Elia Viviani	Italy	31	20	7	31
2	Milan Kadlec	Czech Republic	27	20	10	27
3	Mykhaylo Radionov	Ukraine	14	0	2	14
4	Tristan Marguet	Switzerland	13	0	1	13
5	Wojciech Pszczolarski	Poland	8	0	5	8
6	Yauheni Shamsonau	Belarus	7	0	6	7
7	Theo Reinhardt	Germany	7	0	9	7
8	Andreas Müller	Austria	5	0	8	5
9	Morgan Lamoisson	France	4	0	4	4
10	Kirill Sveshnikov	Russia	4	0	11	4
11	Darijus Džervus	Lithuania	5	−20	12	−15
12	Mika Simola	Finland	3	−20	3	−17

=== Final ===
The race was held at 21:13.

Rank	Name	Nation	Sprint points	Lap points	Final sprint	Total points
1st place, gold medalist(s)	Elia Viviani	Italy	44	0	6	44
2nd place, silver medalist(s)	Kirill Sveshnikov	Russia	26	0	2	26
3rd place, bronze medalist(s)	Sergiy Lagkuti	Ukraine	25	0	3	25
4	Andreas Müller	Austria	17	0	4	17
5	Tristan Marguet	Switzerland	14	0	1	14
6	Liam Bertazzo	Italy	9	0	10	9
7	Wojciech Pszczolarski	Poland	8	0	11	8
8	Milan Kadlec	Czech Republic	7	0	7	7
9	Theo Reinhardt	Germany	6	0	8	6
10	Andreas Graf	Austria	6	0	0	6
11	Bryan Coquard	France	5	0	9	5
12	Yauheni Shamsonau	Belarus	3	0	5	3
13	Théry Schir	Switzerland	2	0	0	2
14	Ingmar De Poortere	Belgium	1	0	0	1
15	Jiří Hochmann	Czech Republic	0	0	0	0
–	Ivan Savitskiy	Russia	2	0	0	DNF
–	Maximilian Beyer	Germany	1	−20	0	DNF
–	Mateusz Nowaczek	Poland	0	0	0	DNF
–	Mykhaylo Radionov	Ukraine	0	−20	0	DNF
–	Morgan Lamoisson	France	0	0	0	DNF
