= Yauheni =

Yauheni is a masculine Belarusian given name, a cognate of Eugene in English and Yevgeni in Russian. Notable people with the name include:

- Yauheni Akhramenka (born 1995), Belarusian cyclist
- Yauheni Hutarovich (born 1983), Belarusian cyclist
- Yauheni Karaliok (born 1996), Belarusian cyclist
- Yauheni Karaliou (born 1991), Belarusian diver
- Yauheni Novikau (born 1996), Belarusian acrobatic gymnast
- Yauheni Shamsonau (born 1991), Belarusian cyclist
- Yauheni Yakauchuk (born 1986), Belarusian badminton player
- Yauheni Zharnasek (born 1987), Belarusian weightlifter
