= Elia Viviani =

Italian cyclist (born 1989)

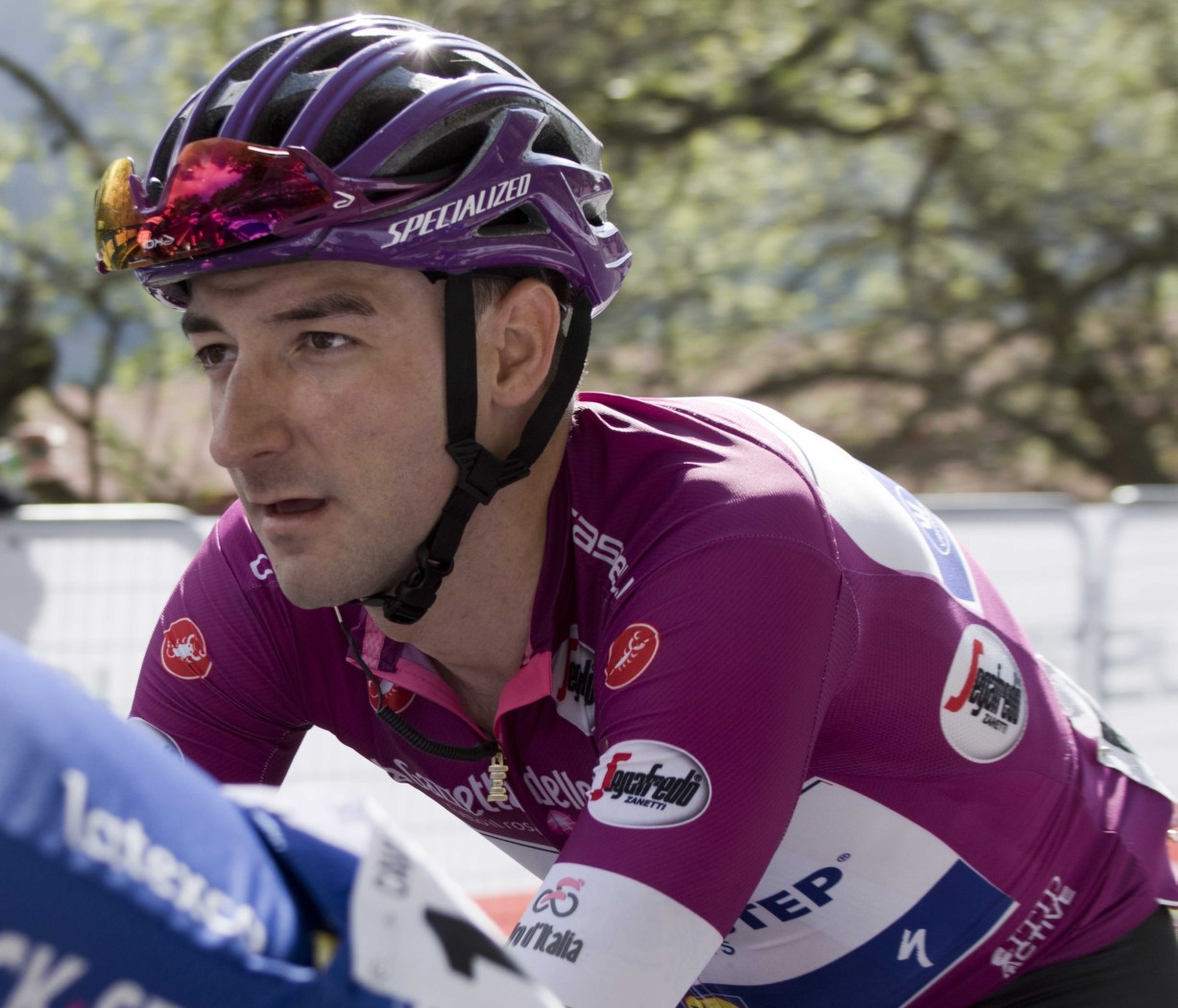
- Viviani at the 2018 Giro d'Italia

Personal information
- Born: 7 February 1989 (age 37) Isola della Scala, Italy
- Height: 1.77 m (5 ft 10 in)
- Weight: 70 kg (154 lb)

Cycling career
- Sport: Cycling
- Current team: Netcompany–Ineos
- Disciplines: Road; Track
- Role: Rider (retired), Directeur sportif
- Rider type: Sprinter

Amateur team
- 2008–2010: Marchiol–Liquigas–Site

Professional teams
- 2010–2014: Liquigas–Doimo
- 2015–2017: Team Sky
- 2018–2019: Quick-Step Floors
- 2020–2021: Cofidis
- 2022–2024: INEOS Grenadiers
- 2025: Lotto

Major wins
- Road Grand Tours Tour de France 1 individual stage (2019) Giro d'Italia Points classification (2018) 5 individual stages (2015, 2018) Vuelta a España 3 individual stages (2018) Stage races Dubai Tour (2018) One-day races and Classics European Road Race Championships (2019) National Road Race Championships (2018) EuroEyes Cyclassics (2017, 2018, 2019) Bretagne Classic (2017) Three Days of Bruges–De Panne (2018) Great Ocean Road Race (2019) London–Surrey Classic (2019) GP de Fourmies (2021) Track Olympic Games Omnium (2016) World Championships Elimination (2021, 2022, 2025)
Medal record
Representing Italy
Men's track cycling
Event	1st	2nd	3rd
Olympic Games	1	1	1
World Track Championships	3	3	3
European Track Championships	8	1	3
European Road Championships	1	1	0
Total	13	6	7
Olympic Games
Gold medal – first place	2016 Rio de Janeiro	Omnium
Silver medal – second place	2024 Paris	Madison
Bronze medal – third place	2020 Tokyo	Omnium
World Championships
Gold medal – first place	2021 Roubaix	Elimination
Gold medal – first place	2022 Saint-Quentin-en-Yvelines	Elimination
Gold medal – first place	2025 Santiago	Elimination
Silver medal – second place	2011 Apeldoorn	Scratch
Silver medal – second place	2015 Yvelines	Madison
Silver medal – second place	2024 Ballerup	Elimination
Bronze medal – third place	2015 Yvelines	Omnium
Bronze medal – third place	2021 Roubaix	Omnium
Bronze medal – third place	2023 Glasgow	Elimination
European Championships
Gold medal – first place	2012 Panevėžys	Points race
Gold medal – first place	2013 Apeldoorn	Points race
Gold medal – first place	2013 Apeldoorn	Madison
Gold medal – first place	2014 Guadeloupe	Omnium
Gold medal – first place	2015 Grenchen	Omnium
Gold medal – first place	2018 Glasgow	Team pursuit
Gold medal – first place	2019 Apeldoorn	Elimination
Gold medal – first place	2022 Munich	Elimination
Silver medal – second place	2018 Glasgow	Omnium
Bronze medal – third place	2011 Apeldoorn	Omnium
Bronze medal – third place	2012 Panevėžys	Team pursuit
Bronze medal – third place	2012 Panevėžys	Madison
Men's road bicycle racing
European Championships
Gold medal – first place	2019 Alkmaar	Road race
Silver medal – second place	2017 Herning	Road race

Elia Viviani (born 7 February 1989) is an Italian former professional cyclist, who competed from 2010 to 2025 and last rode for UCI ProTeam Lotto. On 10 May 2015, Viviani won his first Grand Tour stage victory at the Giro d'Italia, winning stage 2 in a bunch sprint before Moreno Hofland and André Greipel.

In August 2016, Viviani won gold in the omnium at the 2016 Summer Olympics. In 2021, he won bronze in the omnium at the 2020 Summer Olympics. Viviani's nickname in the peloton is "Il Veggente" for his ability to foresee line moves of other sprinters during the sprint.

After retiring, he re-joined his former team Ineos Grenadiers as a directeur sportif.

== Career ==
=== Team Sky (2015–17) ===
==== 2015 season ====
Viviani signed for Team Sky on 24 October 2014 after considering offers from Orica–GreenEDGE and the BMC Racing Team. He chose Team Sky because they were willing to help tailor his road programme to help with his track ambitions at the 2016 Summer Olympics in Rio de Janeiro. After winning Stage 2 of the Dubai Tour, Viviani headed to the Track World Championships in Yvelines winning two medals including bronze in his focused Olympic event, the omnium. Back on the road Viviani made a big leap forward, consistently winning at World Tour level winning stages at the Tour de Romandie, the Eneco Tour and winning his first Grand Tour stage at the Giro d'Italia on stage 2 into Genoa. He ended the season well, becoming the European Track Champion in the omnium, gaining Olympic qualification points in the process. He also won three stages at the Tour of Britain and finished where he started the season, winning in the Middle East, this time at the Abu Dhabi Tour.

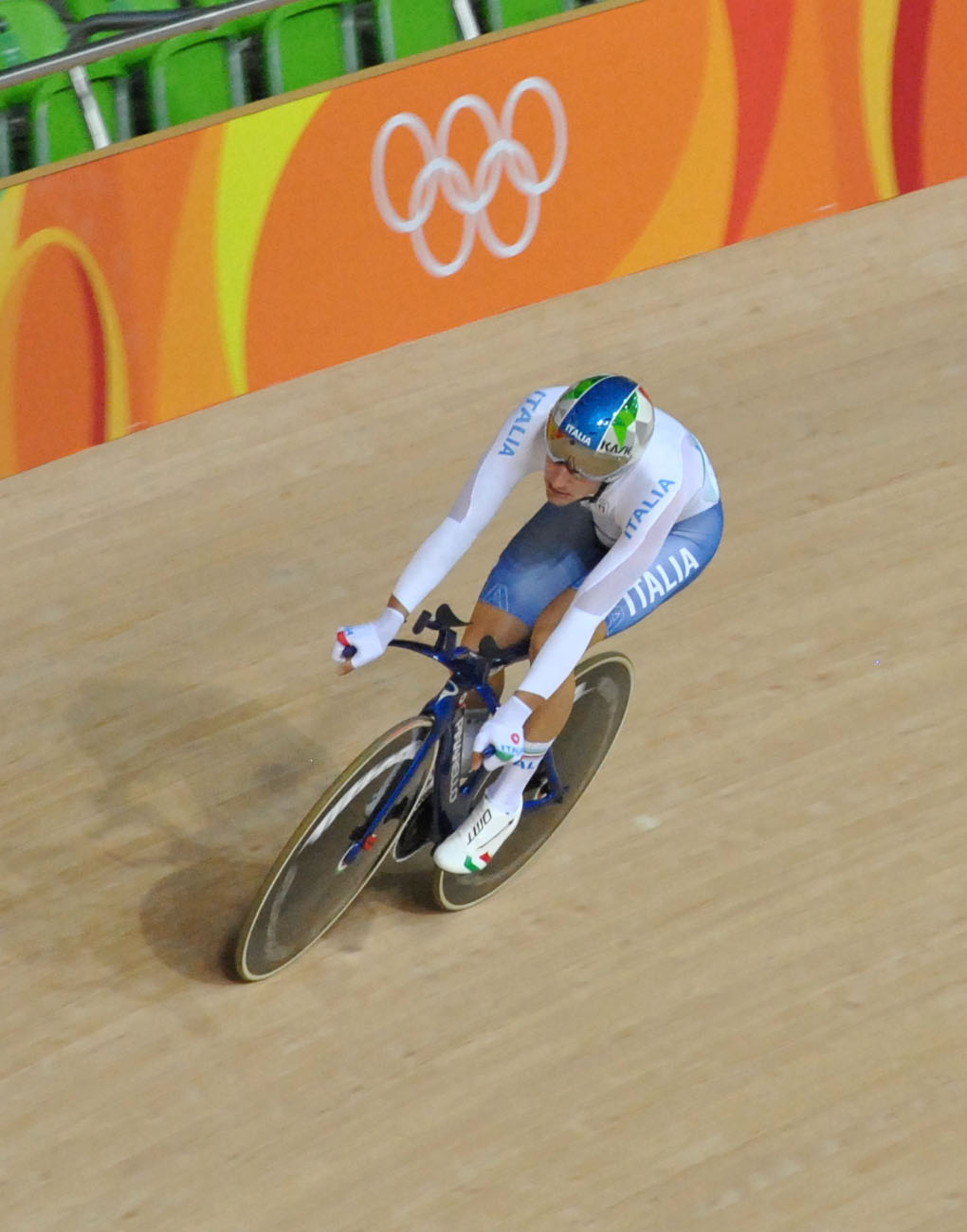
Viviani during the omnium at the 2016 Olympic Games.

=== Quick-Step Floors (2018–19) ===
==== 2018 season ====
Viviani signed for the Quick-Step Floors team before the 2018 season, replacing Marcel Kittel who joined Team Katusha–Alpecin. He got off to a good start winning Stage 3 of the Tour Down Under, the 50th victory since his professional début in 2010. He continued the momentum in the Middle East where he won his first major overall title and two stage wins at the Dubai Tour as well as a stage in the Abu Dhabi Tour. He returned to Europe for his first big objective of the season where he came 19th at Milan–San Remo. He added another success in Belgium at the Three Days of Bruges–De Panne but suffered an emotional defeat at Gent–Wevelgem, finishing in second place behind Peter Sagan. He also won the Italian National Road Race Championships.

==== 2019 season ====
He again got off to a good start in Australia winning the opening stage of the Tour Down Under, and followed it up with the One-day classic Cadel Evans Great Ocean Road Race, going one better than the previous year. Viviani's next win came at the UAE Tour a month later as he had an easier build up to the two Grand Tours he was scheduled to compete in – the Giro d'Italia and the Tour de France. After winning Stage 3 of Tirreno–Adriatico, he underperformed at the Giro d'Italia, where he was disqualified after winning a sprint on Stage 3 into Orbetello, after he was adjudged to have illegally blocked Trek–Segafredo's Matteo Moschetti. After last year's success, he failed to win a single stage in his home tour while wearing the national champion's jersey.

In his build up to the Tour de France he won two sprints in a row at the Tour de Suisse, before going onto win his first stage at the Tour de France into Nancy. Viviani came out of the Tour on top form, winning the London–Surrey Classic. After losing his national champion's jersey in June, he earned the right to wear a non standard team kit again for the following year after he won the European Championships on 11 August in Alkmaar. He won from a three-man break following the attack from trade teammate Yves Lampaert, and beating him and Pascal Ackermann in the sprint.

=== Cofidis (2020–21) ===
In August 2019, Viviani was announced to be joining Cofidis for the 2020 season along with his lead-out man Fabio Sabatini.

=== Ineos Grenadiers (2022–2024) ===
In November 2021, Viviani signed a three-year contract with the INEOS Grenadiers team, from the 2022 season.

=== Retirement ===
Viviani announced his retirement from professional cycling on 10 October 2025.

== Personal life ==
Viviani is married to fellow cyclist Elena Cecchini. His brother Attilio Viviani is also a professional cyclist.

== Major results ==
=== Road ===
2005
European Youth Summer Olympic Festival

1st Road race
1st Criterium

2nd Road race, National Cadet Championships
2009
4th ZLM Tour
7th La Côte Picarde
2010 (3 pro wins)
1st Memorial Marco Pantani
1st Binche–Tournai–Binche
1st Stage 7 Vuelta a Cuba
1st Stage 7 Tour of Turkey
3rd Gran Premio Città di Misano – Adriatico
7th Overall Circuit Franco-Belge
2011 (8)
1st Gran Premio della Costa Etruschi
1st Tour de Mumbai I
1st Coppa Città di Stresa
USA Pro Cycling Challenge

1st Stages 4 & 5

Giro di Padania

1st Points classification
1st Sprints classification
1st Stage 2

1st Stage 4 Tour of Beijing
1st Stage 2 Tour of Slovenia
2nd Tour de Mumbai II
2012 (7)
1st Overall Giro della Provincia di Reggio Calabria

1st Young rider classification
1st Stages 1 & 2

1st Gran Premio della Costa Etruschi
1st Stage 1 Tour of Beijing
1st Stage 2a Settimana Internazionale di Coppi e Bartali
1st Stage 6 Tour de San Luis
2nd Memorial Marco Pantani
2013 (6)
1st Overall Tour of Elk Grove

1st Stages 2 & 3

1st Dutch Food Valley Classic
1st Stage 2 Critérium du Dauphiné
1st Stage 1 Tour of Britain
5th Vattenfall Cyclassics
7th GP Ouest–France
7th Grand Prix de Fourmies
2014 (6)
1st Coppa Bernocchi
Tour of Turkey

1st Stages 5 & 7

1st Stage 3 Settimana Internazionale di Coppi e Bartali
1st Stage 4 Tour of Slovenia
1st Stage 4 USA Pro Challenge
2nd Brussels Cycling Classic
3rd Grand Prix de Fourmies
9th RideLondon–Surrey Classic
Giro d'Italia

Held after Stages 5 & 6

2015 (8)
Giro d'Italia

1st Stage 2
Held after Stages 2–5, 7–9, 13–16

Tour of Britain

1st Stages 1, 3 & 8

Abu Dhabi Tour

1st Points classification
1st Stages 2 & 4

1st Stage 1 Eneco Tour
1st Stage 2 Dubai Tour
1st Stage 1 (TTT) Tour de Romandie
2nd Trofeo Santanyi–Ses Salines–Campos
3rd Kuurne–Brussels–Kuurne
2016 (2)
1st Stage 2 Dubai Tour
1st Stage 2 Three Days of De Panne
2017 (9)
1st EuroEyes Cyclassics
1st Bretagne Classic
Tour of Austria

1st Stages 1 & 3

1st Stage 3 Tour de Romandie
1st Stage 2 Route du Sud
1st Stage 2 Tour of Britain
2nd Road race, UEC European Championships
2nd Scheldeprijs
3rd Gran Premio Bruno Beghelli
5th Overall Dubai Tour
5th Overall Tour du Poitou-Charentes

1st Points classification
1st Stages 1 & 3

5th Coppa Bernocchi
6th Memorial Marco Pantani
6th Coppa Sabatini
9th Milan–San Remo
2018 (18)
1st Road race, National Championships
1st Overall Dubai Tour

1st Points classification
1st Stages 2 & 5

1st EuroEyes Cyclassics
1st Three Days of Bruges–De Panne
Giro d'Italia

1st Points classification
1st Stages 2, 3, 13 & 17

Vuelta a España

1st Stages 3, 10 & 21

Adriatica Ionica Race

1st Points classification
1st Stages 1 (TTT), 2, 4 & 5

Abu Dhabi Tour

1st Points classification
1st Stage 2

1st Stage 3 Tour Down Under
2nd Gent–Wevelgem
2nd Cadel Evans Great Ocean Road Race
2nd London–Surrey Classic
2nd Dwars door het Hageland
6th UCI World Tour
2019 (11)
1st Road race, UEC European Championships
1st Cadel Evans Great Ocean Road Race
1st London–Surrey Classic
1st EuroEyes Cyclassics
UAE Tour

1st Points classification
1st Stage 5

Tour de Suisse

1st Stages 4 & 5

1st Stage 4 Tour de France
1st Stage 1 Tour Down Under
1st Stage 3 Tirreno–Adriatico
1st Stage 4 Okolo Slovenska
2nd Tacx Pro Classic
3rd Three Days of Bruges–De Panne
2020
3rd Clásica de Almería
9th Cadel Evans Great Ocean Road Race
10th Race Torquay
2021 (7)
1st Cholet-Pays de la Loire
1st Grand Prix de Fourmies
1st Grand Prix d'Isbergues
Adriatica Ionica Race

1st Points classification
1st Stages 1 & 3

Tour Poitou-Charentes en Nouvelle-Aquitaine

1st Stages 1 & 3

3rd Grand Prix du Morbihan
9th Classic Brugge–De Panne
10th Coppa Bernocchi
2022 (2)
1st Stage 1 Tour de la Provence
1st Stage 6 CRO Race
6th Overall Circuit de la Sarthe
7th Road race, UEC European Championships
2023 (2)
1st Stage 1 Tour of Guangxi
1st Stage 1 CRO Race
3rd Hamburg Cyclassics
9th Bretagne Classic
2024
2nd Surf Coast Classic
2025 (1)
1st Stage 7 Tour of Turkey

==== Grand Tour general classification results timeline ====
Grand Tour	2012	2013	2014	2015	2016	2017	2018	2019	2020	2021	2022	2023	2024	2025
Giro d'Italia	—	119	145	125	DNF	—	132	DNF	112	135	—	—	—	—
Tour de France	—	—	162	—	—	—	—	130	135	—	—	—	—	—
Vuelta a España	128	—	—	—	—	—	145	—	—	—	—	—	—	150

==== Classics results timeline ====
Monument	2010	2011	2012	2013	2014	2015	2016	2017	2018	2019	2020	2021	2022	2023	2024
Milan–San Remo	—	—	108	108	—	—	84	9	19	65	39	69	116	—	—
Tour of Flanders	—	DNF	—	DNF	—	DNF	—	—	—	—	—	—	—	—	DNF
Paris–Roubaix	—	—	—	—	—	—	DNF	DNF	—	—	NH	—	—	—	DNF
Liège–Bastogne–Liège	Did not contest during his career														
Giro di Lombardia	Did not contest during his career														
Classic	2010	2011	2012	2013	2014	2015	2016	2017	2018	2019	2020	2021	2022	2023	2024
Kuurne–Brussels–Kuurne	—	—	—	—	—	3	DNF	—	—	—	—	—	—	—	—
Brugge–De Panne	Previously a stage race								1	3	—	9	—	—	—
Gent–Wevelgem	—	—	—	15	—	DNF	DNF	—	2	19	—	—	69	—	DNF
Scheldeprijs	—	—	—	—	42	DNF	46	2	—	—	—	31	—	—	—
London–Surrey Classic	—	—	—	—	9	28	—	11	2	1	Not held		Not held		
Hamburg Cyclassics	78	—	—	5	—	14	—	1	1	1	Not held		25	3	52
Bretagne Classic	—	—	—	7	31	15	—	1	—	69	—	—	52	9	—

==== Major championships timeline ====
Event		2010	2011	2012	2013	2014	2015	2016	2017	2018	2019	2020	2021	2022	2023	2024
Olympic Games	Road race	Not held		38	Not held			—	Not held				—	Not held		DNF
World Championships	Road race	—	80	—	—	—	89	20	57	—	—	—	—	—	—	—
European Championships	Road race	Race did not exist						—	2	20	1	—	—	7	44	—
National Championships	Road race	—	—	—	—	DNF	—	33	DNF	1	DNF	DNF	—	14	DNF	DNF

Legend
—	Did not compete
DNF	Did not finish
IP	In progress
NH	Not held

=== Track ===
2006
1st Scratch, UEC European Junior Championships
National Junior Championships

1st Madison
1st Team sprint

3rd Madison, UCI World Junior Championships (with Fabrizio Braggion)
2007
UEC European Junior Championships

1st Points race
3rd Madison (with Tomas Alberio)

1st Madison, National Championships
National Junior Championships

1st Team pursuit
1st Team sprint
3rd Scratch

3rd Team pursuit, UCI World Junior Championships
2008
UEC European Under-23 Championships

1st Scratch
1st Madison (with Tomas Alberio)
3rd Omnium
3rd Team pursuit

National Championships

1st Team pursuit
2nd Points race
2nd Scratch

2009
1st Scratch, UEC European Under-23 Championships
National Championships

1st Team pursuit
1st Omnium
2nd Madison

2010
National Championships

1st Omnium
3rd Madison

2011
UEC European Under-23 Championships

1st Omnium
1st Points race
2nd Madison (with Davide Cimolai)

National Championships

1st Individual pursuit
1st Madison (with Davide Cimolai)
1st Points race
2nd Scratch
2nd Team pursuit
2nd Kilo

1st Six Days of Fiorenzuola (with Jacopo Guarnieri)
2nd Scratch, UCI World Championships
3rd Omnium, UEC European Championships
3rd Omnium, UCI World Cup, Astana
2012
UEC European Championships

1st Points race
3rd Madison (with Angelo Ciccone)
3rd Team pursuit

National Championships

1st Derny
1st Madison (with Michele Scartezzini)
1st Team pursuit

1st 3 Sere di Bassano del Grappa (with Franco Marvulli)
2013
UEC European Championships

1st Points race
1st Madison (with Liam Bertazzo)

National Championships

1st Madison (with Michele Scartezzini)
1st Points race
1st Team pursuit
2nd Individual pursuit
2nd Kilo
2nd Team sprint
3rd Derny
3rd Scratch

2014
1st Omnium, UEC European Championships
National Championships

1st Omnium
2nd Individual pursuit

2015
1st Omnium, UEC European Championships
1st Six Days of Fiorenzuola (with Alex Buttazzoni)
UCI World Championships

2nd Madison (with Marco Coledan)
3rd Omnium

2016
1st Omnium, Olympic Games
1st Six Days of Fiorenzuola (with Michele Scartezzini)
3rd Six Days of Ghent (with Iljo Keisse)
2017
1st Six Days of Turin (with Francesco Lamon)
2018
UEC European Championships

1st Team pursuit
2nd Omnium

1st Six Days of Ghent (with Iljo Keisse)
3rd Omnium, UCI World Cup, London
2019
1st Elimination, UEC European Championships
1st Omnium, National Championships
1st Six Days of London (with Simone Consonni)
2021
UCI World Championships

1st Elimination
3rd Omnium

National Championships

1st Points race
2nd Elimination
3rd Madison (with Attilio Viviani)

3rd Omnium, Olympic Games
2022
1st Elimination, UCI World Championships
1st Elimination, UEC European Championships
1st Elimination, UCI Nations Cup, Glasgow
National Championships

1st Omnium
1st Points race
2nd Individual pursuit

3rd Six Days of Rotterdam (with Vincent Hoppezak)
2023
National Championships

1st Scratch
1st Individual pursuit
1st Points race
2nd Elimination
3rd Madison (with Matteo Donegà)

1st Six Days of Fiorenzuola (with Michele Scartezzini)
3rd Elimination, UCI World Championships
2024
1st Three Days of London (with Simone Consonni)
2nd Madison, Olympic Games (with Simone Consonni)
2nd Elimination, UCI World Championships
UCI Nations Cup, Adelaide

2nd Omnium
3rd Team pursuit

2025
1st Elimination, UCI World Championships
3rd Six Days of Ghent (with Jasper De Buyst)
3rd Six Days of Bremen (with Simone Consonni)
3rd Six Days of Berlin (with Michele Scartezzini)

Summer Olympics
Preceded by Federica Pellegrini	Flagbearer for Italy; Tokyo 2020; With: Jessica Rossi	Succeeded by Incumbent
