= Cycling at the 2020 Summer Olympics – Men's omnium =

Olympic cycling event

Men's Omnium at the Games of the XXXII Olympiad
- Olympic track cycling
- Venues: Izu Velodrome
- Date: 5 August 2021
- Competitors: 20 from 20 nations
- Winning points: 153

Medalists
1st place, gold medalist(s)		Matthew Walls	Great Britain
2nd place, silver medalist(s)		Campbell Stewart	New Zealand
3rd place, bronze medalist(s)		Elia Viviani	Italy

The men's omnium event at the 2020 Summer Olympics took place on 5 August 2021 at the Izu Velodrome. 20 cyclists from 20 nations competed.

== Background ==
This was the 3rd appearance of the event, which was introduced in 2012.

The previous reigning Olympic champion was Elia Viviani of Italy. The reigning (2020) World Champion was Benjamin Thomas of France.

France, Italy, Russia, Germany, China, Great Britain, Australia, and the Netherlands are traditionally strong track cycling nations.

== Qualification ==
A National Olympic Committee (NOC) could enter up to 1 cyclist in the omnium. Quota places are allocated to the NOC, which selects the cyclists. Qualification is entirely through the 2018–20 UCI nation rankings. The best 8 NOCs in the madison rankings (not already qualified through the team pursuit) directly qualified to enter madison teams as well as earning 1 quota place in the omnium. There were another 12 places in the omnium available based on the omnium rankings; NOCs qualified through the madison were not eligible. Each continent was guaranteed at least one place in the omnium. Because qualification was complete by the end of the 2020 UCI Track Cycling World Championships on 1 March 2020 (the last event that contributed to the 2018–20 rankings), qualification was unaffected by the COVID-19 pandemic.

== Competition format ==
An omnium is a multiple-race event. The current event features four different types of races. The format has changed significantly from 2016, with three of the six race types dropped and one replacement added. The omnium also moved from a two-day format in prior Games to a one-day format in 2020. The winner of the omnium is the cyclist who obtains the most points through the four races. The winner of each of the first three races earns 40 points, the second-place cyclist earns 38, the third-place rider 36, and so forth. The final race has special scoring rules. The races in the omnium are:

- Scratch race: Mass start race; first to finish is the winner. Distance is 10 km (40 laps).
- Tempo race: The new race for 2020. The distance is 10 km (40 laps). After the first 5 laps, the winner of each lap earns 1 point. Lapping the field earns 20 points. The winner of the race is the cyclist with the most points (the points earned within the tempo race do not count for the omnium total; they are used only to place cyclists for the race).
- Elimination race: Every 2 laps, the last-place cyclist is eliminated.
- Points race: A 25 km (100 lap) points race, with points earned for sprints (5/3/2/1, every 10 laps with double points for final sprint) and for lapping the field (20 points).

There is only one round of competition.

== Schedule ==
All times are Japan Standard Time (UTC+9)

Date	Time	Round
5 August 2021	15:30; 16:27; 17:07; 17:55	Scratch race Tempo race Elimination race Points race

== Results ==
=== Scratch race ===
Rank	Cyclist	Nation	Laps down	Event points
1	Matthew Walls	Great Britain		40
2	Benjamin Thomas	France		38
3	Jan-Willem van Schip	Netherlands		36
4	Artyom Zakharov	Kazakhstan		34
5	Niklas Larsen	Denmark		32
6	Sam Welsford	Australia	–1	30
7	Campbell Stewart	New Zealand	–1	28
8	Eiya Hashimoto	Japan	–1	26
9	Théry Schir	Switzerland	–1	24
10	Gavin Hoover	United States	–1	22
11	Kenny De Ketele	Belgium	–1	20
12	Roger Kluge	Germany	–1	18
13	Elia Viviani	Italy	–1	16
14	Szymon Sajnok	Poland	–1	14
15	Albert Torres	Spain	–1	12
16	Mark Downey	Ireland	–1	10
17	Christos Volikakis	Greece	–1	8
18	Yauheni Karaliok	Belarus	–1	6
19	Andreas Müller	Austria	–1	4
20	David Maree	South Africa	–2	2

=== Tempo race ===
Rank	Name	Nation	Race points	Event points
1	Jan-Willem van Schip	Netherlands	30	40
2	Benjamin Thomas	France	23	38
3	Matthew Walls	Great Britain	23	36
4	Théry Schir	Switzerland	23	34
5	Gavin Hoover	United States	22	32
6	Niklas Larsen	Denmark	22	30
7	Kenny De Ketele	Belgium	21	28
8	Elia Viviani	Italy	21	26
9	Szymon Sajnok	Poland	21	24
10	Albert Torres	Spain	21	22
11	Roger Kluge	Germany	3	20
12	Campbell Stewart	New Zealand	2	18
13	Sam Welsford	Australia	1	16
14	Yauheni Karaliok	Belarus	1	14
15	Artyom Zakharov	Kazakhstan	1	12
16	Eiya Hashimoto	Japan	1	10
17	Christos Volikakis	Greece	0	8
18	David Maree	South Africa	0	6
19	Mark Downey	Ireland	–20	4
20	Andreas Müller	Austria	–20	2

=== Elimination race ===
Rank	Name	Nation	Event points
1	Elia Viviani	Italy	40
2	Matthew Walls	Great Britain	38
3	Théry Schir	Switzerland	36
4	Jan-Willem van Schip	Netherlands	34
5	Campbell Stewart	New Zealand	32
6	Benjamin Thomas	France	30
7	Albert Torres	Spain	28
8	Niklas Larsen	Denmark	26
9	Sam Welsford	Australia	24
10	Kenny De Ketele	Belgium	22
11	Gavin Hoover	United States	20
12	Eiya Hashimoto	Japan	18
13	Artyom Zakharov	Kazakhstan	16
14	Christos Volikakis	Greece	14
15	David Maree	South Africa	12
16	Szymon Sajnok	Poland	10
17	Roger Kluge	Germany	8
18	Yauheni Karaliok	Belarus	6
19	Mark Downey	Ireland	4
20	Andreas Müller	Austria	2

=== Points race and final standings ===
Rank	Name	Nation	SR	TR	ER	Subtotal	Sprint points	Lap points	Finish order	Total points
1st place, gold medalist(s)	Matthew Walls	Great Britain	40	36	38	114	19	20	2	153
2nd place, silver medalist(s)	Campbell Stewart	New Zealand	28	18	32	78	11	40	17	129
3rd place, bronze medalist(s)	Elia Viviani	Italy	16	26	40	82	22	20	4	124
4	Benjamin Thomas	France	38	38	30	106	12	0	19	118
5	Niklas Larsen	Denmark	32	30	26	88	5	20	13	113
6	Jan-Willem van Schip	Netherlands	36	40	34	110	2	0	7	112
7	Théry Schir	Switzerland	24	34	36	94	15	0	1	109
8	Gavin Hoover	United States	22	32	20	74	5	20	8	99
9	Roger Kluge	Germany	18	20	8	46	5	40	12	91
10	Albert Torres	Spain	12	22	28	62	2	20	11	84
11	Sam Welsford	Australia	30	16	24	70	9	0	3	79
12	Yauheni Karaliok	Belarus	6	14	6	26	10	40	10	76
13	Kenny De Ketele	Belgium	20	28	22	70	0	0	6	70
14	Artyom Zakharov	Kazakhstan	34	12	16	62	0	0	15	62
15	Eiya Hashimoto	Japan	26	10	18	54	0	0	5	54
16	Szymon Sajnok	Poland	14	24	10	48	0	0	14	48
17	Mark Downey	Ireland	10	4	4	18	0	0	9	18
18	Andreas Müller	Austria	4	2	2	8	0	0	16	8
19	David Maree	South Africa	2	6	12	20	3	–40	18	–17
	Christos Volikakis	Greece	8	8	14	30	1	–20	DNF	–
