= 2023 UCI Track Cycling World Championships – Men's elimination =

Men's elimination at the 2023 UCI Track Cycling World Championships
- Venue: Sir Chris Hoy Velodrome
- Location: Glasgow, United Kingdom
- Dates: 7 August
- Competitors: 24 from 24 nations

Medalists
| gold medal | Ethan Vernon | Great Britain |
| silver medal | Dylan Bibic | Canada |
| bronze medal | Elia Viviani | Italy |

The Men's elimination competition at the 2023 UCI Track Cycling World Championships was held on 7 August 2023.

== Results ==
The race was started at 18:28.

| Rank | Name | Nation |
|---|---|---|
| 1st place, gold medalist(s) | Ethan Vernon | Great Britain |
| 2nd place, silver medalist(s) | Dylan Bibic | Canada |
| 3rd place, bronze medalist(s) | Elia Viviani | Italy |
| 4 | Matthijs Büchli | Netherlands |
| 5 | George Jackson | New Zealand |
| 6 | Jules Hesters | Belgium |
| 7 | Claudio Imhof | Switzerland |
| 8 | Gavin Hoover | United States |
| 9 | Donavan Grondin | France |
| 10 | Raphael Kokas | Austria |
| 11 | Tim Torn Teutenberg | Germany |
| 12 | Rotem Tene | Israel |
| 13 | Eiya Hashimoto | Japan |
| 14 | Edwin Sutherland | Barbados |
| 15 | Josh Duffy | Australia |
| 16 | Ramis Dinmukhametov | Kazakhstan |
| 17 | Mario Anguela | Spain |
| 18 | Yacine Chalel | Algeria |
| 19 | Denis Rugovac | Czech Republic |
| 20 | Leung Chun Wing | Hong Kong |
| 21 | Kacper Majewski | Poland |
| 22 | Akil Campbell | Trinidad and Tobago |
| 23 | Tobias Hansen | Denmark |
| 24 | João Martins | Portugal |
