= 2022 UCI Track Cycling World Championships – Men's elimination =

Men's elimination at the 2022 UCI Track Cycling World Championships
- Venue: Vélodrome National
- Location: Saint-Quentin-en-Yvelines, France
- Dates: 16 October
- Competitors: 23 from 23 nations

Medalists
gold medal	Elia Viviani	Italy
silver medal	Corbin Strong	New Zealand
bronze medal	Ethan Vernon	Great Britain

The Men's elimination competition at the 2022 UCI Track Cycling World Championships was held on 16 October 2022.

== Results ==
The race was started at 16:20.

Rank	Name	Nation
1st place, gold medalist(s)	Elia Viviani	Italy
2nd place, silver medalist(s)	Corbin Strong	New Zealand
3rd place, bronze medalist(s)	Ethan Vernon	Great Britain
4	Jules Hesters	Belgium
5	Rotem Tene	Israel
6	João Matias	Portugal
7	Tim Teutenberg	Germany
8	Philip Heijnen	Netherlands
9	Tobias Hansen	Denmark
10	Filip Prokopyszyn	Poland
11	Thomas Boudat	France
12	Gavin Hoover	United States
13	Jordan Parra	Colombia
14	Joshua Duffy	Australia
15	Denis Rugovac	Czech Republic
16	Yacine Chalel	Algeria
17	Eiya Hashimoto	Japan
18	Erik Martorell	Spain
19	Akil Campbell	Trinidad and Tobago
20	Simon Vitzthum	Switzerland
21	Jose Ramon Muñiz	Mexico
22	Ze Yu	China
23	Facundo Lezica	Argentina
24	Dylan Bibic	Canada
