= Kirill Sveshnikov =

Russian bicycle racer

Personal information
- Full name: Kirill Mikhaylovich Sveshnikov; Russian: Кирилл Михайлович Свешников
- Born: 10 February 1992 (age 34) Saint Petersburg, Russia

Cycling career
- Sport: Cycling
- Current team: Lokosphinx
- Disciplines: Road; Track
- Role: Rider

Amateur team
- 2011: Lokomotiv

Professional teams
- 2012–2015: Lokosphinx
- 2016–2017: Gazprom–RusVelo
- 2018–: Lokosphinx

Kirill Mikhaylovich Sveshnikov (Russian: Кирилл Михайлович Свешников; born 10 February 1992) is a Russian cyclist, who currently rides for UCI Continental team Lokosphinx.

== Major results ==
=== Track ===
2010
UEC European Junior Championships

1st Team pursuit
2nd Madison
2nd Points race

UCI Junior Track World Championships

2nd Madison
3rd Points race

2011
1st Team pursuit, UEC European Under-23 Championships
3rd Madison, 2011–12 UCI Track Cycling World Cup, Astana (with Artur Ershov)
2012
2011–12 UCI Track Cycling World Cup

1st Scratch, Beijing
2nd Points race, London

2nd Points race, UEC European Championships
2013
3rd Points race, UCI World Championships
2014
2nd Individual pursuit, UEC European Under-23 Championships
2018
1st Omnium, National Championships

=== Road ===
2009
9th Road race, UCI Juniors World Championships
2014
4th Gran Premio Industrie del Marmo
6th Overall Troféu Joaquim Agostinho

1st Young rider classification
1st Stage 2

7th La Côte Picarde
2015
9th Klasika Primavera
2016
1st Stage 1b (TTT) Settimana Internazionale di Coppi e Bartali
2020
6th Overall Tour of Mevlana
