= Ethan Vernon =

British cyclist (born 2000)

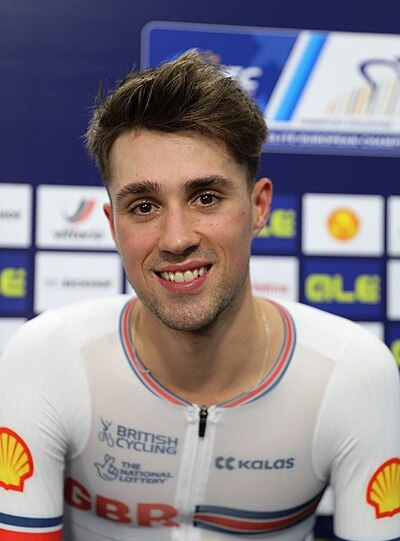
- Vernon in 2024

Personal information
- Born: 26 August 2000 (age 26) Bedford, England
- Height: 1.88 m (6 ft 2 in)
- Weight: 74 kg (163 lb)

Cycling career
- Sport: Cycling
- Current team: NSN Cycling Team
- Disciplines: Road; Track
- Role: Rider
- Rider type: Sprinter

Amateur teams
- 2017: Team Corley Cycles
- 2018: Ribble Pro Cycling
- 2019–2021: Team Inspired

Professional teams
- 2022–2023: Quick-Step Alpha Vinyl Team
- 2024–: Israel–Premier Tech

Major wins
- Track World Championships Elimination (2023) Team pursuit (2022)
Medal record
Men's track cycling
Representing Great Britain;
Olympic Games
Silver medal – second place	2024 Paris	Team pursuit
World Championships
Gold medal – first place	2022 Saint-Quentin-en-Yvelines	Team pursuit
Gold medal – first place	2023 Glasgow	Elimination
Bronze medal – third place	2021 Roubaix	Team pursuit
Bronze medal – third place	2022 Saint-Quentin-en-Yvelines	Elimination
Bronze medal – third place	2026 Shanghai	Team pursuit
European Championships
Gold medal – first place	2024 Apeldoorn	Team pursuit
Silver medal – second place	2020 Plovdiv	1 km time trial
Silver medal – second place	2023 Grenchen	Team pursuit
Representing England
Commonwealth Games
Gold medal – first place	2026 Glasgow	Team pursuit
Silver medal – second place	2022 Birmingham	Team pursuit
Bronze medal – third place	2026 Glasgow	Scratch

Ethan Vernon (born 26 August 2000) is a British road and track cyclist, who currently rides for UCI ProTeam NSN Cycling Team.

== Career ==
=== Early career ===
Vernon competed in BMX until he was 14, before changing focus to the road and track. In 2017 and 2018, he won a total of five national junior track titles. He also won the silver medal in the individual pursuit at the 2018 UCI World Junior Championships. He represented Wales at the 2018 Commonwealth Games in three events, finishing fourth in the team pursuit. He also competed for Great Britain in the team pursuit at the 2018–19 UCI Track Cycling World Cup, where the squad placed third in London. In 2020, he took his first major podium at the elite level, taking silver in the kilometer time trial at the European Championships.

In 2021, he was selected for the team pursuit at the 2020 Summer Olympics, where the team placed 8th in final. That year, the team also placed third at the UCI World Championships.

Vernon also took his first significant road win in 2021, winning the fourth stage of the Tour de l'Avenir in a sprint finish. A month later, he placed seventh in the World Under-23 Time trial Championships.

=== 2022–present ===
In 2022, he joined Quick-Step Alpha Vinyl Team on a two-year contract. In March, he won the fifth stage of the Volta a Catalunya, his first professional win. Vernon next took back-to-back wins at the Okolo Slovenska in September, taking the prologue and first stage.

In January 2023, Vernon won the Trofeo Palma, his second race of the season. A month later, he won the first two stages of the Tour du Rwanda followed by the first stage of the Tour de Romandie in April. In early August, he returned to the track, taking his first elite World Championships title in the elimination race. A few weeks later, he returned to road racing, taking the prologue of the Deutschland Tour.

He signed a three-year contract with Israel–Premier Tech starting in 2024. In 2024, he won his first race of the year: the opening stage of the Tour des Alpes-Maritimes in February. In May, he entered his first Grand Tour: the Giro d'Italia.

At the 2026 Commonwealth Games in Glasgow, he won a gold medal in the team pursuit, and a bronze in the scratch race.

Vernon was a member of Great Britain's team pursuit squad who won the bronze medal at the 2026 UCI Track Cycling World Championships.

== Major results ==
=== Road ===
2019
3rd Time trial, National Under-23 Championships
2021
1st Stage 4 Tour de l'Avenir
7th Time trial, UCI World Under-23 Championships
10th Trofeo Alcudia–Port d'Alcudia
2022 (3 pro wins)
Okolo Slovenska

1st Prologue & Stage 1

1st Stage 5 Volta a Catalunya
5th Grote Prijs Jean-Pierre Monseré
2023 (5)
1st Trofeo Palma
Deutschland Tour

1st Points classification
1st Prologue

Tour du Rwanda

1st Stages 1 & 2

1st Stage 1 Tour de Romandie
2nd Trofeo Ses Salines–Alcúdia
5th Time trial, National Championships
6th Overall Four Days of Dunkirk
2024 (3)
Tour of Guangxi

1st Points classification
1st Stages 3 & 4

1st Stage 1 Tour des Alpes-Maritimes
1st Points classification, Tour of Britain
3rd Time trial, National Championships
2025 (1)
1st Stage 2 Volta a Catalunya
National Championships

3rd Road race
4th Time trial

4th Bredene Koksijde Classic
5th Binche–Chimay–Binche
Vuelta a España

Held after Stage 1

2026 (4)
Région Pays de la Loire Tour

1st Stages 1 & 2

1st Stage 4 Volta a Catalunya
1st Stage 4 Tour Down Under
3rd Grand Prix de Fourmies
4th Time trial, National Championships
4th Gooikse Pijl

==== Grand Tour general classification results timeline ====
Grand Tour	2024	2025	2026
Giro d'Italia	DNF	—	DNF
Tour de France	—	—	
Vuelta a España	—	142	

Legend
—	Did not compete
DNF	Did not finish

=== Track ===
2017
National Junior Championships

1st Individual pursuit
1st Points race
1st Kilo
3rd Scratch

3rd Madison, National Championships (with William Tidball)
2018
National Junior Championships

1st Individual pursuit
1st Madison (with William Tidball)

2nd Individual pursuit, UCI World Junior Championships
National Championships

2nd Madison (with Rhys Britton)
3rd Team pursuit

2019
2nd Team pursuit, National Championships
2020
2nd Kilo, UEC European Championships
National Championships

2nd Team pursuit
3rd Scratch

2021
3rd Team pursuit, UCI World Championships
2022
UCI World Championships

1st Team pursuit
3rd Elimination

2nd Team pursuit, Commonwealth Games
2nd Team pursuit, UCI Nations Cup, Glasgow
2023
1st Elimination, UCI World Championships
2nd Team pursuit, UEC European Championships
2024
1st Team pursuit, UEC European Championships
1st Team pursuit, UCI Nations Cup, Milton
2nd Team pursuit, Olympic Games
2026
Commonwealth Games

1st Team pursuit
3rd Scratch

3rd Team pursuit, UCI World Championships
