= 2019 UCI Track Cycling World Championships – Men's omnium =

Men's omnium at the 2019 UCI Track Cycling World Championships
- Venue: BGŻ Arena
- Location: Pruszków, Poland
- Dates: 2 March
- Competitors: 24 from 24 nations
- Winning points: 137

Medalists
gold medal	Campbell Stewart	New Zealand
silver medal	Benjamin Thomas	France
bronze medal	Ethan Hayter	Great Britain

The Men's omnium competition at the 2019 UCI Track Cycling World Championships was held on 2 March 2019.

== Results ==
=== Scratch race ===
The scratch race was started at 13:16.

Rank	Name	Nation	Laps down	Event points
1	Albert Torres	Spain		40
2	Sam Welsford	Australia	−1	38
3	Campbell Stewart	New Zealand	−1	36
4	Ethan Hayter	Great Britain	−1	34
5	Simone Consonni	Italy	−1	32
6	Jan-Willem van Schip	Netherlands	−1	30
7	Eiya Hashimoto	Japan	−1	28
8	Lindsay De Vylder	Belgium	−1	26
9	Raman Tsishkou	Belarus	−1	24
10	Daniel Holloway	United States	−1	22
11	Christos Volikakis	Greece	−1	20
12	Niklas Larsen	Denmark	−1	18
13	Szymon Sajnok	Poland	−1	16
14	Ignacio Prado	Mexico	−1	14
15	Claudio Imhof	Switzerland	−1	12
16	Ángel Pulgar	Venezuela	−1	10
17	Derek Gee	Canada	−1	8
18	João Matias	Portugal	−1	6
19	Tomas Contte	Argentina	−1	4
20	Artyom Zakharov	Kazakhstan	−1	2
21	Moritz Malcharek	Germany	−1	1
22	Krisztián Lovassy	Hungary	−1	1
23	Benjamin Thomas	France	−1	1
24	Leung Ka Yu	Hong Kong	−1	1

=== Tempo race ===
The tempo race was started at 15:33.

Rank	Name	Nation	Lap points	Total points	Event points
1	Ethan Hayter	Great Britain	20	25	40
2	Eiya Hashimoto	Japan	20	22	38
3	Benjamin Thomas	France	0	15	36
4	Campbell Stewart	New Zealand	0	4	34
5	Moritz Malcharek	Germany	0	3	32
6	Christos Volikakis	Greece	0	2	30
7	Jan-Willem van Schip	Netherlands	0	2	28
8	Albert Torres	Spain	0	1	26
9	Simone Consonni	Italy	0	1	24
10	Derek Gee	Canada	0	0	22
11	Sam Welsford	Australia	0	0	20
12	Raman Tsishkou	Belarus	0	0	18
13	Niklas Larsen	Denmark	0	0	16
14	Lindsay De Vylder	Belgium	0	0	14
15	Daniel Holloway	United States	0	0	12
16	Claudio Imhof	Switzerland	0	0	10
17	Tomas Contte	Argentina	0	0	8
18	Leung Ka Yu	Hong Kong	0	0	6
19	Szymon Sajnok	Poland	0	0	4
20	João Matias	Portugal	0	0	2
21	Ignacio Prado	Mexico	0	0	1
22	Krisztián Lovassy	Hungary	0	0	1
23	Artyom Zakharov	Kazakhstan	0	0	1
24	Ángel Pulgar	Venezuela	−40	−40	1

=== Elimination race ===
The elimination race was started at 18:17.

Rank	Name	Nation	Event points
1	Benjamin Thomas	France	40
2	Jan-Willem van Schip	Netherlands	38
3	Claudio Imhof	Switzerland	36
4	Albert Torres	Spain	34
5	Campbell Stewart	New Zealand	32
6	Daniel Holloway	United States	30
7	Ethan Hayter	Great Britain	28
8	Simone Consonni	Italy	26
9	Christos Volikakis	Greece	24
10	Raman Tsishkou	Belarus	22
11	Eiya Hashimoto	Japan	20
12	Moritz Malcharek	Germany	18
13	João Matias	Portugal	16
14	Artyom Zakharov	Kazakhstan	14
15	Sam Welsford	Australia	12
16	Szymon Sajnok	Poland	10
17	Niklas Larsen	Denmark	8
18	Ignacio Prado	Mexico	6
19	Tomas Contte	Argentina	4
20	Derek Gee	Canada	2
21	Ángel Pulgar	Venezuela	1
22	Krisztián Lovassy	Hungary	1
23	Leung Ka Yu	Hong Kong	1
24	Lindsay De Vylder	Belgium	1

=== Points race and overall standings ===
The points race was started at 19:26.

Rank	Name	Nation	Lap points	Sprint points	Total points
1st place, gold medalist(s)	Campbell Stewart	New Zealand	20	15	137
2nd place, silver medalist(s)	Benjamin Thomas	France	20	22	119
3rd place, bronze medalist(s)	Ethan Hayter	Great Britain	0	16	118
4	Simone Consonni	Italy	20	16	114
5	Jan-Willem van Schip	Netherlands	0	8	104
6	Albert Torres	Spain	0	1	101
7	Eiya Hashimoto	Japan	0	5	91
8	Niklas Larsen	Denmark	40	5	87
9	Raman Tsishkou	Belarus	20	2	86
10	Claudio Imhof	Switzerland	20	5	83
11	Christos Volikakis	Greece	0	5	79
12	Sam Welsford	Australia	0	5	75
13	Daniel Holloway	United States	0	0	64
14	Lindsay De Vylder	Belgium	20	1	62
15	Derek Gee	Canada	20	7	59
16	Moritz Malcharek	Germany	0	3	54
17	João Matias	Portugal	20	1	45
18	Szymon Sajnok	Poland	0	6	36
19	Ignacio Prado	Mexico	0	0	21
20	Artyom Zakharov	Kazakhstan	0	2	19
21	Tomas Contte	Argentina	0	0	16
22	Leung Ka Yu	Hong Kong	0	0	8
23	Krisztián Lovassy	Hungary	0	0	3
24	Ángel Pulgar	Venezuela	−40	0	−28
