= 2023 Deutschland Tour =

2023 UCI ProSeries

Race details
- Dates: 23 – 27 August 2023
- Stages: 5
- Distance: 724.2 km (450.0 mi)
- Winning time: 17h 01' 18"

Results
Jersey awarded to the overall winner	Winner	Ilan Van Wilder (BEL)	(Soudal–Quick-Step)
	Second	Felix Großschartner (AUT)	(UAE Team Emirates XRG)
	Third	Danny van Poppel (NED)	(Bora–Hansgrohe)
Jersey awarded to the points classification winner	Points	Ethan Vernon (GBR)	(Soudal–Quick-Step)
Jersey awarded to the mountains classification winner	Mountains	Harm Vanhoucke (BEL)	(Lotto–Dstny)
Jersey awarded to the youth classification winner	Youth	Ilan Van Wilder (BEL)	(Soudal–Quick-Step)
Jersey awarded to the team classification winner	Team	(United Arab Emirates) UAE Team Emirates	

The 2023 Deutschland Tour is a men's road cycling stage race which took place from 23 to 27 August 2023. It is the 37th edition of the Deutschland Tour, which is rated as a 2.Pro event on the 2023 UCI ProSeries calendars. This edition is the race's third in the UCI ProSeries.

== Teams ==
10 of the 18 UCI WorldTeams, six UCI ProTeams, and four UCI Continental teams made up the twenty teams in the race.

UCI WorldTeams

- Alpecin–Deceuninck
- Bora–Hansgrohe
- Ineos Grenadiers
- Intermarché–Circus–Wanty
- Lidl–Trek
- Movistar Team
- Soudal–Quick-Step
- Team Bahrain Victorious
- Team dsm–firmenich
- UAE Team Emirates

UCI ProTeams

- Israel–Premier Tech
- Lotto–Dstny
- Q36.5 Pro Cycling Team
- Team TotalEnergies
- Tudor Pro Cycling Team
- Uno-X Pro Cycling Team

UCI Continental Teams

- Bike Aid
- P&S Benotti
- Rad-Net Oßwald
- Saris Rouvy Sauerland Team

== Schedule ==
Stage characteristics and winners
Stage	Date	Route	Distance	Type	Stage winner
P	23 August	St. Wendel	2.2 km (1.4 mi)	Individual time trial	Ethan Vernon (GBR)
1	24 August	St. Wendel to Merzig	178 km (111 mi)	Mountain stage	Ilan Van Wilder (BEL)
2	25 August	Kassel to Winterberg	190 km (120 mi)	Medium-mountain stage	Gregor Mühlberger (AUT)
3	26 August	Arnsberg to Essen	174 km (108 mi)	Medium-mountain stage	Madis Mihkels (EST)
4	27 August	Hannover to Bremen	180 km (110 mi)	Flat stage	Arvid de Kleijn (NED)
Total			724.2 km (450.0 mi)		

== Stages ==
=== Prologue ===
23 August 2023 – St. Wendel, 2.3 km (1.4 mi)

Prologue Result
Rank	Rider	Team	Time
1	Ethan Vernon (GBR)	Soudal–Quick-Step	2' 23"
2	Mads Pedersen (DEN)	Lidl–Trek	+ 1"
3	Maikel Zijlaard (NED)	Tudor Pro Cycling Team	+ 3"
4	Danny van Poppel (NED)	Bora–Hansgrohe	+ 3"
5	Nils Politt (GER)	Bora–Hansgrohe	+ 3"
6	Jannik Steimle (GER)	Soudal–Quick-Step	+ 4"
7	Rasmus Tiller (NOR)	Uno-X Pro Cycling Team	+ 5"
8	Madis Mihkels (EST)	Intermarché–Circus–Wanty	+ 5"
9	Sam Bennett (IRL)	Bora–Hansgrohe	+ 5"
10	Marco Haller (AUT)	Bora–Hansgrohe	+ 6"

General classification after Prologue
Rank	Rider	Team	Time
1	Ethan Vernon (GBR)	Soudal–Quick-Step	2' 23"
2	Mads Pedersen (DEN)	Lidl–Trek	+ 1"
3	Maikel Zijlaard (NED)	Tudor Pro Cycling Team	+ 3"
4	Danny van Poppel (NED)	Bora–Hansgrohe	+ 3"
5	Nils Politt (GER)	Bora–Hansgrohe	+ 3"
6	Jannik Steimle (GER)	Soudal–Quick-Step	+ 4"
7	Rasmus Tiller (NOR)	Uno-X Pro Cycling Team	+ 5"
8	Madis Mihkels (EST)	Intermarché–Circus–Wanty	+ 5"
9	Sam Bennett (IRL)	Bora–Hansgrohe	+ 5"
10	Marco Haller (AUT)	Bora–Hansgrohe	+ 6"

=== Stage 1 ===
24 August 2023 – St. Wendel to Merzig, 189 km (117 mi)

Stage 1 Result
Rank	Rider	Team	Time
1	Ilan Van Wilder (BEL)	Soudal–Quick-Step	4h 17' 39"
2	Felix Großschartner (AUT)	UAE Team Emirates	+ 0"
3	Pavel Sivakov (FRA)	Ineos Grenadiers	+ 0"
4	Kevin Vermaerke (USA)	Team dsm–firmenich	+ 3"
5	Pello Bilbao (ESP)	Team Bahrain Victorious	+ 3"
6	Dylan Teuns (BEL)	Israel–Premier Tech	+ 3"
7	Danny van Poppel (NED)	Bora–Hansgrohe	+ 10"
8	Ethan Vernon (GBR)	Soudal–Quick-Step	+ 10"
9	Nikias Arndt (GER)	Team Bahrain Victorious	+ 10"
10	Alex Kirsch (LUX)	Lidl–Trek	+ 10"

General classification after Stage 1
Rank	Rider	Team	Time
1	Ilan Van Wilder (BEL)	Soudal–Quick-Step	4h 19' 56"
2	Felix Großschartner (AUT)	UAE Team Emirates	+ 9"
3	Pavel Sivakov (FRA)	Ineos Grenadiers	+ 10"
4	Ethan Vernon (GBR)	Soudal–Quick-Step	+ 16"
5	Danny van Poppel (NED)	Bora–Hansgrohe	+ 19"
6	Nils Politt (GER)	Bora–Hansgrohe	+ 19"
7	Pello Bilbao (ESP)	Team Bahrain Victorious	+ 20"
8	Kevin Vermaerke (USA)	Team dsm–firmenich	+ 21"
9	Dylan Teuns (BEL)	Israel–Premier Tech	+ 21"
10	Rasmus Tiller (NOR)	Uno-X Pro Cycling Team	+ 21"

=== Stage 2 ===
25 August 2023 – Kassel to Winterberg, 190 km (120 mi)

Stage 2 Result
Rank	Rider	Team	Time
1	Gregor Mühlberger (AUT)	Movistar Team	4h 59' 51"
2	Alex Aranburu (ESP)	Movistar Team	+ 10"
3	Kevin Vermaerke (USA)	Team dsm–firmenich	+ 10"
4	Pavel Sivakov (FRA)	Ineos Grenadiers	+ 10"
5	Ilan Van Wilder (BEL)	Soudal–Quick-Step	+ 10"
6	Danny van Poppel (NED)	Bora–Hansgrohe	+ 10"
7	Nils Politt (GER)	Bora–Hansgrohe	+ 10"
8	Georg Zimmermann (GER)	Intermarché–Circus–Wanty	+ 10"
9	Rasmus Tiller (NOR)	Uno-X Pro Cycling Team	+ 10"
10	Mathias Vacek (CZE)	Lidl–Trek	+ 10"

General classification after Stage 2
Rank	Rider	Team	Time
1	Ilan Van Wilder (BEL)	Soudal–Quick-Step	9h 19' 54"
2	Felix Großschartner (AUT)	UAE Team Emirates	+ 11"
3	Pavel Sivakov (FRA)	Ineos Grenadiers	+ 13"
4	Kevin Vermaerke (USA)	Team dsm–firmenich	+ 18"
5	Alex Aranburu (ESP)	Movistar Team	+ 19"
6	Danny van Poppel (NED)	Bora–Hansgrohe	+ 22"
7	Nils Politt (GER)	Bora–Hansgrohe	+ 22"
8	Pello Bilbao (ESP)	Team Bahrain Victorious	+ 23"
9	Dylan Teuns (BEL)	Israel–Premier Tech	+ 24"
10	Rasmus Tiller (NOR)	Uno-X Pro Cycling Team	+ 24"

=== Stage 3 ===
26 August 2023 – Arnsberg to Essen, 174 km (108 mi)

Stage 3 Result
Rank	Rider	Team	Time
1	Madis Mihkels (EST)	Intermarché–Circus–Wanty	3h 59' 49"
2	Danny van Poppel (NED)	Bora–Hansgrohe	+ 0"
3	Quinten Hermans (BEL)	Alpecin–Deceuninck	+ 0"
4	Phil Bauhaus (GER)	Team Bahrain Victorious	+ 0"
5	Ethan Vernon (GBR)	Soudal–Quick-Step	+ 0"
6	Emilien Jeannière (FRA)	Team TotalEnergies	+ 0"
7	Alex Aranburu (ESP)	Movistar Team	+ 0"
8	Rick Zabel (GER)	Israel–Premier Tech	+ 0"
9	Mads Pedersen (DEN)	Lidl–Trek	+ 0"
10	Gianluca Brambilla (ITA)	Q36.5 Pro Cycling Team	+ 0"

General classification after Stage 3
Rank	Rider	Team	Time
1	Ilan Van Wilder (BEL)	Soudal–Quick-Step	13h 19' 43"
2	Felix Großschartner (AUT)	UAE Team Emirates	+ 11"
3	Pavel Sivakov (FRA)	Ineos Grenadiers	+ 13"
4	Danny van Poppel (NED)	Bora–Hansgrohe	+ 16"
5	Alex Aranburu (ESP)	Movistar Team	+ 17"
6	Kevin Vermaerke (USA)	Team dsm–firmenich	+ 18"
7	Rasmus Tiller (NOR)	Uno-X Pro Cycling Team	+ 21"
8	Nils Politt (GER)	Bora–Hansgrohe	+ 22"
9	Dylan Teuns (BEL)	Israel–Premier Tech	+ 23"
10	Quinten Hermans (BEL)	Alpecin–Deceuninck	+ 23"

=== Stage 4 ===
27 August 2023 – Hannover to Bremen, 180 km (110 mi)

Stage 4 Result
Rank	Rider	Team	Time
1	Arvid de Kleijn (NED)	Tudor Pro Cycling Team	3h 41' 35"
2	Phil Bauhaus (GER)	Team Bahrain Victorious	+ 0"
3	Marius Mayrhofer (GER)	Team dsm–firmenich	+ 0"
4	Emilien Jeannière (FRA)	Team TotalEnergies	+ 0"
5	Rüdiger Selig (GER)	Lotto–Dstny	+ 0"
6	Ethan Vernon (GBR)	Soudal–Quick-Step	+ 0"
7	Pascal Ackermann (GER)	UAE Team Emirates	+ 0"
8	Matteo Moschetti (ITA)	Q36.5 Pro Cycling Team	+ 0"
9	Sam Bennett (IRL)	Bora–Hansgrohe	+ 0"
10	Natnael Tesfatsion (ERI)	Lidl–Trek	+ 0"

General classification after Stage 4
Rank	Rider	Team	Time
1	Ilan Van Wilder (BEL)	Soudal–Quick-Step	17h 01' 18"
2	Felix Großschartner (AUT)	UAE Team Emirates	+ 11"
3	Danny van Poppel (NED)	Bora–Hansgrohe	+ 13"
4	Pavel Sivakov (FRA)	Ineos Grenadiers	+ 13"
5	Alex Aranburu (ESP)	Movistar Team	+ 17"
6	Kevin Vermaerke (USA)	Team dsm–firmenich	+ 18"
7	Rasmus Tiller (NOR)	Uno-X Pro Cycling Team	+ 20"
8	Quinten Hermans (BEL)	Alpecin–Deceuninck	+ 21"
9	Nils Politt (GER)	Bora–Hansgrohe	+ 22"
10	Dylan Teuns (BEL)	Israel–Premier Tech	+ 23"

== Classification leadership table ==
Classification leadership by stage
Stage	Winner	General classification	Points classification	Mountains classification	Young rider classification	Team classification	Combativity award
P	Ethan Vernon	Ethan Vernon	Ethan Vernon	not awarded	Ethan Vernon	Soudal–Quick-Step	not awarded
1	Ilan Van Wilder	Ilan Van Wilder	Ethan Vernon	Harm Vanhoucke	Ilan Van Wilder	Soudal–Quick-Step	
2	Gregor Mühlberger	Ilan Van Wilder	Ilan Van Wilder	Harm Vanhoucke	Ilan Van Wilder	UAE Team Emirates	
3	Madis Mihkels	Ilan Van Wilder	Ethan Vernon	Harm Vanhoucke	Ilan Van Wilder	UAE Team Emirates	
4	Arvid de Kleijn	Ilan Van Wilder	Ethan Vernon	Harm Vanhoucke	Ilan Van Wilder	UAE Team Emirates	
Final		Ilan Van Wilder	Ethan Vernon	Harm Vanhoucke	Ilan Van Wilder	UAE Team Emirates	

== Classification standings ==
Legend
Denotes the winner of the general classification	Denotes the winner of the young rider classification
Denotes the winner of the points classification	Denotes the winner of the team classification
Denotes the winner of the mountains classification	Denotes the winner of the combativity award

=== General classification ===
Final general classification (1–10)
Rank	Rider	Team	Time
1	Ilan Van Wilder (BEL)	Soudal–Quick-Step	17h 01' 18"
2	Felix Großschartner (AUT)	UAE Team Emirates	+ 11"
3	Danny van Poppel (NED)	Bora–Hansgrohe	+ 13"
4	Pavel Sivakov (FRA)	Ineos Grenadiers	+ 13"
5	Alex Aranburu (ESP)	Movistar Team	+ 17"
6	Kevin Vermaerke (USA)	Team dsm–firmenich	+ 18"
7	Rasmus Tiller (NOR)	Uno-X Pro Cycling Team	+ 20"
8	Quinten Hermans (BEL)	Alpecin–Deceuninck	+ 21"
9	Nils Politt (GER)	Bora–Hansgrohe	+ 22"
10	Dylan Teuns (BEL)	Israel–Premier Tech	+ 23"

=== Points classification ===
Final points classification (1–10)
Rank	Rider	Team	Points
1	Ethan Vernon (GBR)	Soudal–Quick-Step	39
2	Danny van Poppel (NED)	Bora–Hansgrohe	28
3	Ilan Van Wilder (BEL)	Soudal–Quick-Step	21
4	Phil Bauhaus (GER)	Team Bahrain Victorious	19
5	Madis Mihkels (EST)	Intermarché–Circus–Wanty	18
6	Pavel Sivakov (FRA)	Ineos Grenadiers	16
7	Alex Aranburu (ESP)	Movistar Team	16
8	Kevin Vermaerke (USA)	Team dsm–firmenich	16
9	Gregor Mühlberger (AUT)	Movistar Team	15
10	Arvid de Kleijn (NED)	Tudor Pro Cycling Team	15

=== Mountains classification ===
Final mountains classification (1–10)
Rank	Rider	Team	Points
1	Harm Vanhoucke (BEL)	Lotto–Dstny	7
2	Florian Stork (GER)	Team dsm–firmenich	5
3	Vincent John (GER)	Rad-Net Oßwald	4
4	Vinzent Dorn (GER)	Bike Aid	3
5	Gregor Mühlberger (AUT)	Movistar Team	3
6	Anders Halland Johannessen (NOR)	Uno-X Pro Cycling Team	3
7	Oscar Riesebeek (NED)	Alpecin–Deceuninck	3
8	Frank van den Broek (NED)	Team dsm–firmenich	3
9	Brandon McNulty (USA)	UAE Team Emirates	3
10	Julian Borresch (GER)	Saris Rouvy Sauerland Team	2

=== Young rider classification ===
Final young rider classification (1–10)
Rank	Rider	Team	Time
1	Ilan Van Wilder (BEL)	Soudal–Quick-Step	17h 01' 18"
2	Kevin Vermaerke (USA)	Team dsm–firmenich	+ 18"
3	Brandon McNulty (USA)	UAE Team Emirates	+ 27"
4	Mathias Vacek (CZE)	Lidl–Trek	+ 28"
5	Frank van den Broek (NED)	Team dsm–firmenich	+ 30"
6	Mathieu Burgaudeau (FRA)	Team TotalEnergies	+ 32"
7	Vinzent Dorn (GER)	Bike Aid	+ 1' 00"
8	Mattéo Vercher (FRA)	Team TotalEnergies	+ 1' 22"
9	Rick Pluimers (NED)	Tudor Pro Cycling Team	+ 1' 30"
10	Juri Hollmann (GER)	Movistar Team	+ 1' 31"

=== Team classification ===
Final team classification (1–10)
Rank	Team	Time
1	(United Arab Emirates) UAE Team Emirates	51h 05' 06"
2	(Netherlands) Team dsm–firmenich	+ 8"
3	(Spain) Movistar Team	+ 11"
4	(Germany) Bora–Hansgrohe	+ 24"
5	(United States) Lidl–Trek	+ 2' 28"
6	Israel–Premier Tech	+ 2' 33"
7	Team Bahrain Victorious	+ 4' 08"
8	(France) Team TotalEnergies	+ 4' 19"
9	(Belgium) Intermarché–Circus–Wanty	+ 6' 45"
10	(Belgium) Soudal–Quick-Step	+ 8' 37"
