= 2025 UCI Track Cycling World Championships – Men's elimination =

Men's elimination at the 2025 UCI Track Cycling World Championships
- Venue: Velódromo Peñalolén
- Location: Santiago, Chile
- Dates: 26 October
- Competitors: 24 from 24 nations

Medalists
gold medal	Elia Viviani	Italy
silver medal	Campbell Stewart	New Zealand
bronze medal	Yoeri Havik	Netherlands

The Men's elimination competition at the 2025 UCI Track Cycling World Championships was held on 26 October 2025.

== Results ==
Rank	Name	Nation
1st place, gold medalist(s)	Elia Viviani	Italy
2nd place, silver medalist(s)	Campbell Stewart	New Zealand
3rd place, bronze medalist(s)	Yoeri Havik	Netherlands
4	William Tidball	United Kingdom
5	Ellande Larronde	France
6	Max-David Briese	Germany
7	Daniel Staniszewski	Poland
8	Matyáš Koblížek	Czech Republic
9	Alvaro Navas	Spain
10	Jules Hesters	Belgium
11	Ricardo Peña	Mexico
12	Tim Wafler	Austria
13	Dylan Bibic	Canada
14	Grant Koontz	United States
15	João Matias	Portugal
16	Akil Campbell	Trinidad and Tobago
17	Alex Vogel	Switzerland
18	Jacob Decar	Chile
19	Tobias Hansen	Denmark
20	Liam Walsh	Australia
21	Mahmoud Bakr	Egypt
22	Clever Martinez	Venezuela
23	Martin Chren	Slovakia
24	Eiya Hashimoto	Japan
