= Campbell Stewart =

New Zealand cyclist (born 1998)

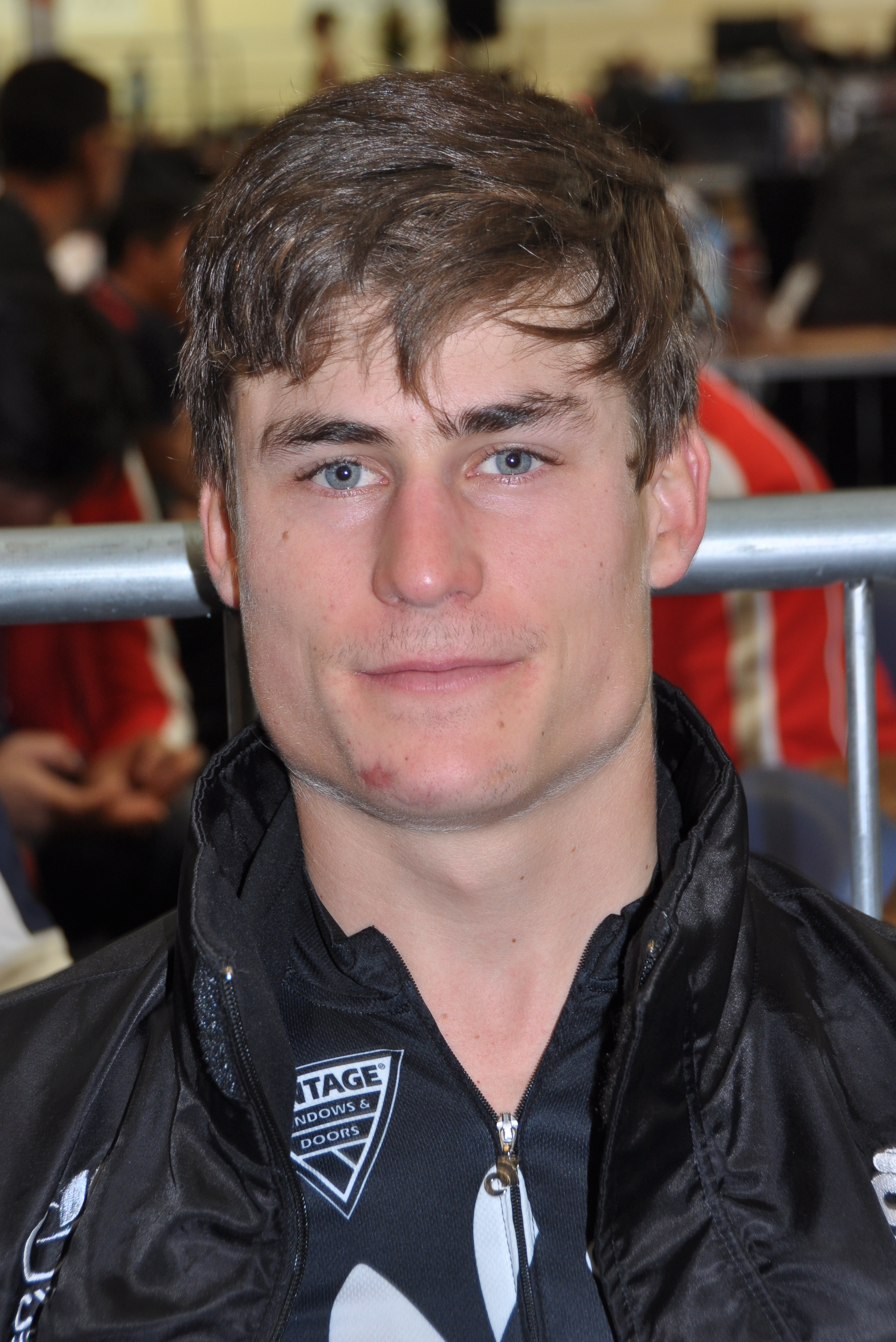
- Stewart in 2018

Personal information
- Born: 12 May 1998 (age 28) Palmerston North, New Zealand
- Height: 1.81 m (5 ft 11 in)
- Weight: 74 kg (163 lb)

Cycling career
- Sport: Cycling
- Current team: Retired
- Disciplines: Track; Road
- Role: Rider
- Rider type: Endurance (track)

Amateur teams
- 2017: Mobius Future Racing
- 2020: Base Solutions

Professional teams
- 2018: WIGGINS
- 2021–2022: Black Spoke Pro Cycling
- 2022–2025: Team BikeExchange–Jayco

Major wins
- Track Omnium, World Championships (2019)
Medal record
Men's track cycling
Representing New Zealand
Olympic Games
Silver medal – second place	2020 Tokyo	Omnium
World Championships
Gold medal – first place	2019 Pruszków	Omnium
Silver medal – second place	2020 Berlin	Madison
Silver medal – second place	2020 Berlin	Team pursuit
Silver medal – second place	2025 Santiago	Elimination
Bronze medal – third place	2023 Glasgow	Madison
Bronze medal – third place	2023 Glasgow	Team pursuit
Commonwealth Games
Gold medal – first place	2022 Birmingham	Team pursuit
Silver medal – second place	2018 Gold Coast	Scratch
Silver medal – second place	2018 Gold Coast	Points race
UCI Junior Track World Championships
Gold medal – first place	2015 Astana	Scratch
Gold medal – first place	2015 Astana	Omnium
Gold medal – first place	2016 Aigle	Team pursuit
Gold medal – first place	2016 Aigle	Omnium
Silver medal – second place	2016 Aigle	Madison

Campbell Stewart (born 12 May 1998) is a New Zealand professional track and road cyclist, who last rode for UCI WorldTeam Team Jayco–AlUla. He represented his country at the 2018 Commonwealth Games, gaining two silver medals in the scratch race and points race, and the 2020 Summer Olympics, gaining a silver medal in the omnium.

== Career ==
Stewart rode for WIGGINS in 2018.

At the 2020 Summer Olympics in Tokyo, Stewart competed in the team pursuit event. After fellow rider Aaron Gate crashed in the team pursuit bronze medal race and fractured his collarbone, Stewart took Gate's places in the omnium and madison events.

Stewart joined Team BikeExchange–Jayco on a two-year deal from 2022.

In mid 2026 Stewart announced his retirement from professional cycling.

== Personal life ==
Stewart was born in Palmerston North in 1998, and attended Palmerston North Boys' High School.

== Major results ==
=== Road ===
2015
1st Road race, National Junior Championships
2016
1st Stage 4 National Capital Tour
2019
1st Stage 2 Tour of Southland
6th White Spot / Delta Road Race
2020
1st Stage 2 New Zealand Cycle Classic
1st Stage 5 Tour of Southland
2021
1st Stage 5 New Zealand Cycle Classic
2nd Overall A Travers les Hauts de France

1st Stages 2 & 3

7th Omloop van het Houtland
9th Gravel and Tar Classic
2023 (1 Pro win)
1st Stage 6 CRO Race
6th Schwalbe Classic

=== Grand Tour general classification results timeline ===
Grand Tour	2023
Giro d'Italia	108
Tour de France	-
Vuelta a España	

=== Track ===
2014
1st Omnium, Oceania Junior Championships
2015
UCI World Junior Championships

1st Omnium
1st Scratch

1st Omnium, National Junior Championships
2016
UCI World Junior Championships

1st Omnium
1st Team pursuit
2nd Madison (with Tom Sexton)

UCI World Cup

2nd Scratch, Los Angeles
2nd Omnium, Los Angeles
3rd Madison, Los Angeles (with Tom Sexton)

2017
Oceania Championships

1st Madison (with Tom Sexton)
2nd Team pursuit
2nd Omnium

1st Madison, National Championships (with Dylan Kennett)
UCI World Cup

1st Team pursuit, Milton
1st Team pursuit, Santiago
1st Madison, Santiago (with Tom Sexton)
2nd Madison, Milton (with Tom Sexton)

2018
UCI World Cup

1st Team pursuit, Cambridge
1st Madison, Hong Kong (with Tom Sexton)
1st Madison, Cambridge (with Aaron Gate)
3rd Omnium, Milton
3rd Omnium, Hong Kong

Commonwealth Games

2nd Scratch
2nd Points race

3rd Omnium, Oceania Championships
2019
1st Omnium, UCI World Championships
1st Madison, National Championships (with Jordan Kerby)
UCI World Cup

1st Omnium, Hong Kong
1st Omnium, Cambridge
1st Madison, Cambridge (with Aaron Gate)
2nd Team pursuit, Hong Kong
2nd Team pursuit, Brisbane
2nd Madison, Hong Kong (with Tom Sexton)

Oceania Championships

2nd Madison
2nd Omnium

2020
1st Madison, National Championships (with Aaron Gate)
UCI World Championships

2nd Madison (with Aaron Gate)
2nd Team pursuit

2021
2nd Omnium, Olympic Games
2022
1st Team pursuit, Commonwealth Games
2023
UCI World Championships

3rd Madison (with Aaron Gate)
3rd Team pursuit

2025
2nd Elimination, UCI World Championships

Awards
Preceded by Eliza McCartney	Halberg Awards; Emerging Talent Award; 2016	Succeeded by Ellesse Andrews
