= Marc Potts =

Irish male track cyclist

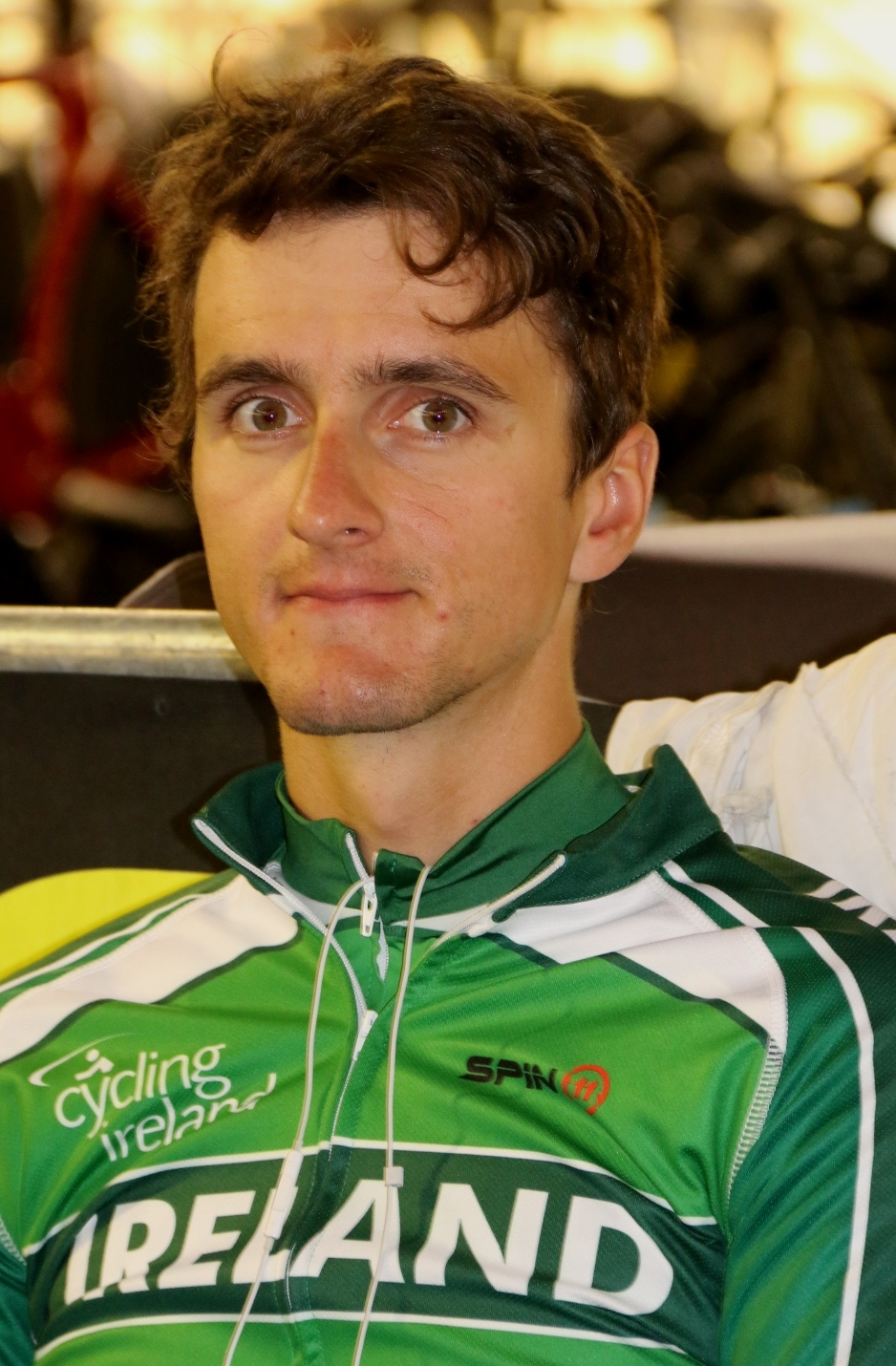
- Marc Potts (2017)

Personal information
- Full name: Marc Wiliford Potts
- Born: 10 October 1991 (age 35) Beragh, County Tyrone, Northern Ireland
- Height: 185 cm (73 in)
- Weight: 73 kg (161 lb)

Cycling career
- Sport: Cycling
- Current team: Neon Velo
- Discipline: Track cycling
- Rider type: Road/track/MTB

Major wins
- Shay Elliot, Irish National Titles

Marc Potts (born 10 October 1991) is a male track cyclist, representing Ireland at international competitions. He competed at the 2016 UEC European Track Championships in the Men's Points race and in the 4 km individual pursuit. He placed 4th in the 2017 UEC European Track Championships in the Men's Scratch race.

Northern Ireland's Marc Potts was the only cyclist at GC2018 to compete in all three disciplines: Mountain Bike, Road and Track.

A track specialist, Potts competed in the men's 40 km points race and the men's 15 km scratch race during the first week of the Games. He then switched focus on Mountain Bike and the men's Road Race in the second week.

2017

4th - UEC European Track Championships - Scratch

5th - Track cycling World cup - Poland

8th - Madison - Track cycling world cup - Manchester

13th - Scratch - Track cycling world cup - Manchester

2018

13th - World Track Championships - Apeldoorn, NED - Scratch race

18th - Commonwealth Games - Cross Country Mountain biking

12th - Commonwealth Games - Track Cycling. - Points Race

28th - Commonwealth Games - Road Race
