= David Maree =

South African cyclist (born 1989)

Personal information
- Born: 31 August 1989 (age 37) Kroonstad, South Africa

Cycling career
- Sport: Cycling
- Current team: Team Enza
- Disciplines: Road; Track
- Role: Rider
- Rider type: All-rounder

Amateur teams
- 2014–2015: Team Abantu
- 2016: Team Telkom
- 2017–2018: Team BCX
- 2019: DNS Sports
- 2019–: Team Enza

Professional team
- 2009: Team Neotel

David Maree (born 31 August 1989) is a South African road and track cyclist, who currently rides for South African amateur team Enza. He qualified to compete in the omnium at the 2020 Summer Olympics.

== Major results ==
2013
6th Overall Mzansi Tour

1st Mountains classification

2015
KZN Autumn Series

5th PMB Road Classic
10th Mayday Classic

2016
1st Team pursuit, National Track Championships (with Nolan Hoffman, Morne van Niekerk & Reynard Butler)
2017
1st Omnium, National Track Championships
2019
1st Points race, National Track Championships
2020
African Track Championships

1st Points race
1st Omnium
2nd Scratch
3rd Team pursuit

2021
African Track Championships

1st Points race
1st Team pursuit (with Stephanus van Heerden, Kyle Swanepoel & Dillon Geary)
2nd Elimination race
