= 2009 UCI Track Cycling World Championships – Men's madison =

Men's madison at the 2009 UCI Track Cycling World Championships
- Venue: BGŻ Arena, Pruszków
- Date: 28 March 2009

The Men's madison event of the 2009 UCI Track Cycling World Championships was held on 28 March 2009.

== Results ==
Rank	Names	Nation	S1	S2	S3	S4	S5	S6	S7	S8	S9	S10	Points	Laps down
1	Michael Mørkøv; Alex Rasmussen	Denmark	5		5	2		5		5			22	
2	Leigh Howard; Cameron Meyer	Australia						2					2	
3	Martin Bláha; Jiří Hochmann	Czech Republic											0	
4	Kenny De Ketele; Tim Mertens	Belgium	2	5			2		5			3	17	-1
5	Roger Kluge; Olaf Pollack	Germany		1	3			3		3	3	2	15	-1
6	Mark Cavendish; Peter Kennaugh	United Kingdom	1	3		3	3			1	2		13	-1
7	Angelo Ciccone; Elia Viviani	Italy		2		5		1		2			10	-1
8	Daniel Holloway; Colby Pearce	United States			1				1			5	7	-1
9	Sergiy Lagkuti; Mykhaylo Radionov	Ukraine											0	-1
10	Alexander Äschbach; Franco Marvulli	Switzerland											0	-1
11	Pim Ligthart; Wim Stroetinga	Netherlands											0	-1
12	Unai Elorriaga Zubiaur; David Muntaner Juaneda	Spain	3				1		3				7	-2
13	Lukasz Bujko; Rafał Ratajczyk	Poland			2						5		7	-2
14	Sebastian Donadio; Martin Garrido Mayorga	Argentina					5				1		6	-2
15	Mikhail Ignatiev; Alexei Markov	Russia				1			2				3	-2
16	Julien Duval; Morgan Kneisky	France										1	1	-2
17	Andreas Graf; Andreas Mueller	Austria											0	-2
18	Juan Esteban Arango; Carlos Urán	Colombia											0	-2
