= 2007 in track cycling =

== News ==
=== January ===
- 2 – Bruno Risi and Franco Marvulli win the 2007 Six Days of Zürich with a total of 394 points, having 37 points advantage in favour of Robert Bartko and Iljo Keisse. The rest of the pack was one or more laps behind. cyclingnews.com
- 18 – Peter Schep returns into the sport after recovering from his injury. He will be able to defend his world title in Mallorca. telesport.nl

== World championships ==
Men's Events	Winner
Sprint	Theo Bos (NED)
Keirin	Chris Hoy (GBR)
1 km time trial	Chris Hoy (GBR)
Points race	Joan Llaneras (ESP)
Individual pursuit	Bradley Wiggins (GBR)
Scratch	Wong Kam Po (HKG)
Team sprint	France; Grégory Baugé; Mickaël Bourgain; Arnaud Tournant
Team pursuit	United Kingdom; Edward Clancy; Geraint Thomas; Paul Manning; Bradley Wiggins
Madison	Switzerland; Franco Marvulli; Bruno Risi; Arnaud Tournant
Omnium	Alois Kaňkovský (CZE)

Women's Events	Winner
Sprint	Victoria Pendleton (GBR)
Keirin	Victoria Pendleton (GBR)
500 m time trial	Anna Meares (AUS)
Points race	Katherine Bates (AUS)
Individual pursuit	Sarah Hammer (USA)
Scratch	Yumari González (CUB)
Team sprint	United Kingdom; Victoria Pendleton; Shanaze Reade

== National championships ==
(Netherlands) 2007 Dutch National Track Championships
(France) French National Track Championships
(Australia) Australian National Track Championships
(United Kingdom) British National Track Championships
United States National Track Championships

== Six-day events ==
The 2007 Six days track cycling events are multi-race competitions, each taking place over six days at various locations in mainland Europe. The riders challenge each other in track cycling disciplines including the madison, track time trials, sprints, and Derny motor-paced races.

The competitions are organised by the UCI.

Date	Place	Winners	
1–6 June 2006	Fiorenzuola, Italy	(Switzerland) Franco Marvulli	(Italy) Marco Villa
28 September −3 October 2006	Maastricht, Netherlands	(Switzerland) Bruno Risi	(Switzerland) Franco Marvulli
16–21 October 2006	Amsterdam, Netherlands	(Netherlands) Danny Stam	(Netherlands) Peter Schep
26–31 October 2006	Grenoble, France	(Switzerland) Alexander Äschbach	(Switzerland) Franco Marvulli
26–31 October 2006	Dortmund, Germany	(Germany) Erik Zabel	(Switzerland) Bruno Risi
9–14 November 2006	Munich, Germany	(Germany) Erik Zabel	(Switzerland) Bruno Risi
21–26 November 2006	Ghent, Belgium	cancelled after day five due to the death of Isaac Gálvez	
28 December −2 January 2007	(Switzerland) 2007 Six Days of Zürich	(Switzerland) Bruno Risi	(Switzerland) Franco Marvulli
4–9 January 2007	(Netherlands) 2007 Six Days of Rotterdam	(Belgium) Iljo Keisse	(Germany) Robert Bartko
11–16 January 2007	(Germany) 2007 Six Days of Bremen	(Germany) Erik Zabel	(Switzerland) Bruno Risi
18–23 January 2007	(Germany) 2007 Six Days of Stuttgart	(Switzerland) Bruno Risi	(Switzerland) Franco Marvulli (Switzerland) Alexander Äschbach
25–30 January 2007	(Germany) 2007 Six Days of Berlin	(Germany) Guido Fulst	(Germany) Leif Lampater

== UIV Cup ==
Date	Place	Winners	
16–21 October 2006	Amsterdam, Netherlands	(United Kingdom) Ross Sander	(United Kingdom) Jonathan Bellis
26–31 October 2006	Dortmund, Germany	(Switzerland) Loïc Perizzolo	(Switzerland) Maxime Bally
9–14 November 2006	Munich, Germany	(Germany) Christian Kux	(Germany) Marcel Kalz
21–26 November 2006	Ghent, Belgium	(Germany) Michael Arends	(Germany) Erik Mohs
4–9 January 2007	(Netherlands) 2007 UIV Cup Rotterdam	(Belgium) Tim Mertens	(Belgium) Ingmar De Poortere
11–16 January 2007	(Germany) Bremen	(Germany) Robert Kriegs	(Denmark) Daniel Kreutzfeldt
18–23 January 2007	(Germany) Stuttgart	(Switzerland) Maxime Bally	(Moldova) Alexandre Pliușchin
25–30 January 2007	(Germany) Berlin	(Belgium) Tim Mertens	(Belgium) Ingmar De Poortere

== Sprint events ==
Date	Place	Winner	Runner-up
4–9 January 2007	(Netherlands) 2007 Rotterdam Sprint Cup	(Netherlands) Theo Bos	(Netherlands) Tim Veldt
6–6 January 2007	(Netherlands) 2007 Masters of Sprint	(Netherlands) Theo Bos	(Scotland) Craig MacLean

== See also ==
- 2007 in women's road cycling
- 2007 in men's road cycling
- 2007 in sports
- 2008 in track cycling
