= 2012 European Track Championships – Men's madison =

UEC European Champion jersey

The Men's madison was held on 21 October 2012. 14 teams participated.

== Medalists ==
Gold	Czech Republic; Martin Bláha; Jiří Hochmann
Silver	Russia; Artur Ershov; Valery Kaykov
Bronze	Italy; Angelo Ciccone; Elia Viviani

== Results ==
It was held at 18:17.

Rank	Nation	Cyclists	Points	Laps
1st place, gold medalist(s)	Czech Republic	Martin Bláha; Jiří Hochmann	13	0
2nd place, silver medalist(s)	Russia	Artur Ershov; Valery Kaykov	1	0
3rd place, bronze medalist(s)	Italy	Angelo Ciccone; Elia Viviani	20	−1
4	Switzerland	Tristan Marguet; Silvan Dillier	17	−1
5	Austria	Andreas Graf; Andreas Müller	16	−1
6	Germany	Henning Bommel; Theo Reinhardt	15	−1
7	Italy	Michele Scartezzini; Liam Bertazzo	9	−1
8	France	Vivien Brisse; Thomas Boudat	8	−1
9	Czech Republic	Milan Kadlec; Marek Mixa	3	−1
10	Ukraine	Mykhaylo Radionov; Sergiy Lagkuti	0	−1
11	Germany	Kersten Thiele; Domenic Weinstein	2	−2
–	France	Morgan Lamoisson; Bryan Coquard		DNF
–	Poland	Mateusz Nowaczek; Mateusz Mikulicz		DNF
–	Switzerland	Olivier Beer; Théry Schir		DNF
