= 2011 UCI Track Cycling World Championships – Men's madison =

Rainbow jersey

The Men's madison at the 2011 UCI Track Cycling World Championships was held on March 27. 16 teams participated in the contest.

== Results ==
The race was held at 15:35.

Rank	Name	Nation	Points	Laps down
1st place, gold medalist(s)	Leigh Howard; Cameron Meyer	Australia	8	0
2nd place, silver medalist(s)	Martin Bláha; Jiří Hochmann	Czech Republic	1	0
3rd place, bronze medalist(s)	Theo Bos; Peter Schep	Netherlands	21	−1
4	Vivien Brisse; Morgan Kneisky	France	18	−1
5	Unai Elorriaga Zubiaur; David Muntaner Juaneda	Spain	17	−1
6	Elia Viviani; Davide Cimolai	Italy	13	−1
7	Kenny De Ketele; Tim Mertens	Belgium	7	−1
8	Andreas Graf; Andreas Müller	Austria	7	−1
9	Weimar Roldán; Carlos Urán	Colombia	5	−1
10	Alexander Khatuntsev; Kirill Yatsevich	Russia	4	−1
11	Alexander Äschbach; Tristan Marguet	Switzerland	3	−1
12	Ralf Matzka; Robert Bengsch	Germany	2	−1
13	Aaron Gate; Thomas Scully	New Zealand	2	−1
14	Sebastian Donadio; Gerardo Fernández	Argentina	1	−2
15	Sergiy Lagkuti; Mykhaylo Radionov	Ukraine	1	−2
16	Kwok Ho Ting; Choi Ki Ho	Hong Kong	0	−2
