= 2007 UIV Cup Rotterdam =

The 2007 UIV Cup Rotterdam was held from 5 to 9 January 2007 in Rotterdam Ahoy Sportpaleis in Rotterdam. The event was scheduled together with the 2007 Six Days of Rotterdam. Eleven teams existing of under-23 riders challenged each other in a five-day madison event.

== Day 1 ==
No.	Riders	Laps	Points	Total ranking	Laps	Points
1	(Belgium) Tim Mertens (Belgium) Ingmar De Poortere	0	6	(Belgium) Tim Mertens (Belgium) Ingmar De Poortere	0	6
2	(Germany) Marcel Kalz (Germany) Roger Kluge	1	8	(Germany) Marcel Kalz (Germany) Roger Kluge	1	8
3	(Netherlands) Pim Ligthart (Netherlands) Jeff Vermeulen	1	5	(Netherlands) Pim Ligthart (Netherlands) Jeff Vermeulen	1	5
4	(Denmark) Daniel Kreutzfeldt (Denmark) Michael Færk Christensen	1	5	(Denmark) Daniel Kreutzfeldt (Denmark) Michael Færk Christensen	1	5
5	(Netherlands) Niels Pieters (Netherlands) Kevin Sluimer	1	2	(Netherlands) Niels Pieters (Netherlands) Kevin Sluimer	1	2
6	(Austria) Georg Tazreiter (Austria) Georg Lauscha	1	1	(Austria) Georg Tazreiter (Austria) Georg Lauscha	1	1
7	(Czech Republic) Jiří Hochmann (Czech Republic) Jakob Kratochvila	1	1	(Czech Republic) Jiří Hochmann (Czech Republic) Jakob Kratochvila	1	1
8	(Switzerland) Maxime Bally (Switzerland) Loïc Perizzolo	2	5	(Switzerland) Maxime Bally (Switzerland) Loïc Perizzolo	2	5
9	(Switzerland) Kilian Moser (Switzerland) Réne Schibli	2	0	(Switzerland) Kilian Moser (Switzerland) Réne Schibli	2	0
10	(Netherlands) Gerd Steijn (Netherlands) Harm Steijn	2	0	(Netherlands) Gerd Steijn (Netherlands) Harm Steijn	2	0
11	(Netherlands) Jorrit Walgien (Netherlands) Thijs Bezemer	4	0	(Netherlands) Jorrit Walgien (Netherlands) Thijs Bezemer	4	0

== Day 2 ==
No.	Riders	Laps	Points	Total ranking	Laps	Points
1	(Belgium) Tim Mertens (Belgium) Ingmar De Poortere	0	11	(Belgium) Tim Mertens (Belgium) Ingmar De Poortere	0	17
2	(Germany) Marcel Kalz (Germany) Roger Kluge	0	8	(Germany) Marcel Kalz (Germany) Roger Kluge	1	16
3	(Netherlands) Niels Pieters (Netherlands) Kevin Sluimer	0	4	(Netherlands) Pim Ligthart (Netherlands) Jeff Vermeulen	1	6
4	(Switzerland) Maxime Bally (Switzerland) Loïc Perizzolo	0	3	(Netherlands) Niels Pieters (Netherlands) Kevin Sluimer	1	6
5	(Netherlands) Pim Ligthart (Netherlands) Jeff Vermeulen	0	1	(Denmark) Daniel Kreutzfeldt (Denmark) Michael Færk Christensen	1	5
6	(Austria) Georg Tazreiter (Austria) Georg Lauscha	0	0	(Austria) Georg Tazreiter (Austria) Georg Lauscha	1	1
7	(Czech Republic) Jiří Hochmann (Czech Republic) Jakob Kratochvila	0	0	(Czech Republic) Jiří Hochmann (Czech Republic) Jakob Kratochvila	1	1
8	(Denmark) Daniel Kreutzfeldt (Denmark) Michael Færk Christensen	0	0	(Switzerland) Maxime Bally (Switzerland) Loïc Perizzolo	2	8
9	(Netherlands) Gerd Steijn (Netherlands) Harm Steijn	0	0	(Netherlands) Gerd Steijn (Netherlands) Harm Steijn	2	0
10	(Netherlands) Jorrit Walgien (Netherlands) Thijs Bezemer	1	6	(Switzerland) Kilian Moser (Switzerland) Réne Schibli	3	0
11	(Switzerland) Kilian Moser (Switzerland) Réne Schibli	1	0	(Netherlands) Jorrit Walgien (Netherlands) Thijs Bezemer	5	6

== Day 3 ==
No.	Riders	Laps	Points	Total ranking	Laps	Points
1	(Belgium) Tim Mertens (Belgium) Ingmar De Poortere	0	4	(Belgium) Tim Mertens (Belgium) Ingmar De Poortere	0	21
2	(Germany) Marcel Kalz (Germany) Roger Kluge	1	10	(Germany) Marcel Kalz (Germany) Roger Kluge	2	26
3	(Switzerland) Maxime Bally (Switzerland) Loïc Perizzolo	1	3	(Denmark) Daniel Kreutzfeldt (Denmark) Michael Færk Christensen	2	5
4	(Denmark) Daniel Kreutzfeldt (Denmark) Michael Færk Christensen	1	0	(Netherlands) Niels Pieters (Netherlands) Kevin Sluimer	3	12
5	(Netherlands) Gerd Steijn (Netherlands) Harm Steijn	1	0	(Switzerland) Maxime Bally (Switzerland) Loïc Perizzolo	3	11
6	(Netherlands) Niels Pieters (Netherlands) Kevin Sluimer	2	6	(Netherlands) Pim Ligthart (Netherlands) Jeff Vermeulen	3	9
7	(Netherlands) Pim Ligthart (Netherlands) Jeff Vermeulen	2	3	(Netherlands) Gerd Steijn (Netherlands) Harm Steijn	3	0
8	(Austria) Georg Tazreiter (Austria) Georg Lauscha	3	2	(Austria) Georg Tazreiter (Austria) Georg Lauscha	4	3
9	(Switzerland) Kilian Moser (Switzerland) Réne Schibli	4	0	(Czech Republic) Jiří Hochmann (Czech Republic) Jakob Kratochvila	5	6
10	(Czech Republic) Jiří Hochmann (Czech Republic) Jakob Kratochvila	5	5	(Switzerland) Kilian Moser (Switzerland) Réne Schibli	7	0
11	(Netherlands) Jorrit Walgien (Netherlands) Thijs Bezemer	6	0	(Netherlands) Jorrit Walgien (Netherlands) Thijs Bezemer	11	6

== Day 4 ==
No.	Riders	Laps	Points	Total ranking	Laps	Points
1	(Germany) Marcel Kalz (Germany) Roger Kluge	0	11	(Belgium) Tim Mertens (Belgium) Ingmar De Poortere	0	28
2	(Belgium) Tim Mertens (Belgium) Ingmar De Poortere	0	7	(Germany) Marcel Kalz (Germany) Roger Kluge	2	37
3	(Denmark) Daniel Kreutzfeldt (Denmark) Michael Færk Christensen	0	5	(Denmark) Daniel Kreutzfeldt (Denmark) Michael Færk Christensen	2	12
4	(Netherlands) Pim Ligthart (Netherlands) Jeff Vermeulen	0	4	(Netherlands) Niels Pieters (Netherlands) Kevin Sluimer	3	15
5	(Netherlands) Niels Pieters (Netherlands) Kevin Sluimer	0	3	(Netherlands) Pim Ligthart (Netherlands) Jeff Vermeulen	3	12
6	(Austria) Georg Tazreiter (Austria) Georg Lauscha	0	2	(Netherlands) Gerd Steijn (Netherlands) Harm Steijn	3	0
7	(Netherlands) Gerd Steijn (Netherlands) Harm Steijn	0	0	(Switzerland) Maxime Bally (Switzerland) Loïc Perizzolo	4	11
8	(Czech Republic) Jiří Hochmann (Czech Republic) Jakob Kratochvila	0	0	(Austria) Georg Tazreiter (Austria) Georg Lauscha	4	5
9	(Switzerland) Kilian Moser (Switzerland) Réne Schibli	1	0	(Czech Republic) Jiří Hochmann (Czech Republic) Jakob Kratochvila	5	6
10	(Switzerland) Maxime Bally (Switzerland) Loïc Perizzolo	1	0	(Switzerland) Kilian Moser (Switzerland) Réne Schibli	8	0
11	(Netherlands) Jorrit Walgien (Netherlands) Thijs Bezemer	1	0	(Netherlands) Jorrit Walgien (Netherlands) Thijs Bezemer	12	6

== Day 5 ==
No.	Riders	Laps	Points	Total ranking	Laps	Points
1	(Germany) Marcel Kalz (Germany) Roger Kluge	0	16	(Belgium) Tim Mertens (Belgium) Ingmar De Poortere	0	38
2	(Denmark) Daniel Kreutzfeldt (Denmark) Michael Færk Christensen	0	6	(Germany) Marcel Kalz (Germany) Roger Kluge	1	53
3	(Switzerland) Maxime Bally (Switzerland) Loïc Perizzolo	0	6	(Denmark) Daniel Kreutzfeldt (Denmark) Michael Færk Christensen	1	18
4	(Czech Republic) Jiří Hochmann (Czech Republic) Jakob Kratochvila	0	0	(Netherlands) Niels Pieters (Netherlands) Kevin Sluimer	3	24
5	(Belgium) Tim Mertens (Belgium) Ingmar De Poortere	1	10	(Netherlands) Pim Ligthart (Netherlands) Jeff Vermeulen	3	17
6	(Netherlands) Niels Pieters (Netherlands) Kevin Sluimer	1	9	(Switzerland) Maxime Bally (Switzerland) Loïc Perizzolo	3	17
7	(Netherlands) Pim Ligthart (Netherlands) Jeff Vermeulen	1	5	(Netherlands) Gerd Steijn (Netherlands) Harm Steijn	3	3
8	(Netherlands) Gerd Steijn (Netherlands) Harm Steijn	1	3	(Czech Republic) Jiří Hochmann (Czech Republic) Jakob Kratochvila	4	6
9	(Switzerland) Kilian Moser (Netherlands) Thijs Bezemer	1	0	(Switzerland) Kilian Moser (Netherlands) Thijs Bezemer	9	0
10	(Austria) Georg Tazreiter (Austria) Georg Lauscha	13	0	(Austria) Georg Tazreiter (Austria) Georg Lauscha	14	5
11	(Netherlands) Jorrit Walgien (Switzerland) Réne Schibli	out	out	(Netherlands) Jorrit Walgien (Switzerland) Réne Schibli	out	out

Réne Schibli and Jorrit Walgien were injured and could not take part in the last race. As a result Kilian Moser and Thijs Bezemer rode together with the Schibli and Moser score.
