= Cycling at the 2008 Summer Olympics – Men's points race =

Olympic cycling event

Men's points race at the Games of the XXIX Olympiad
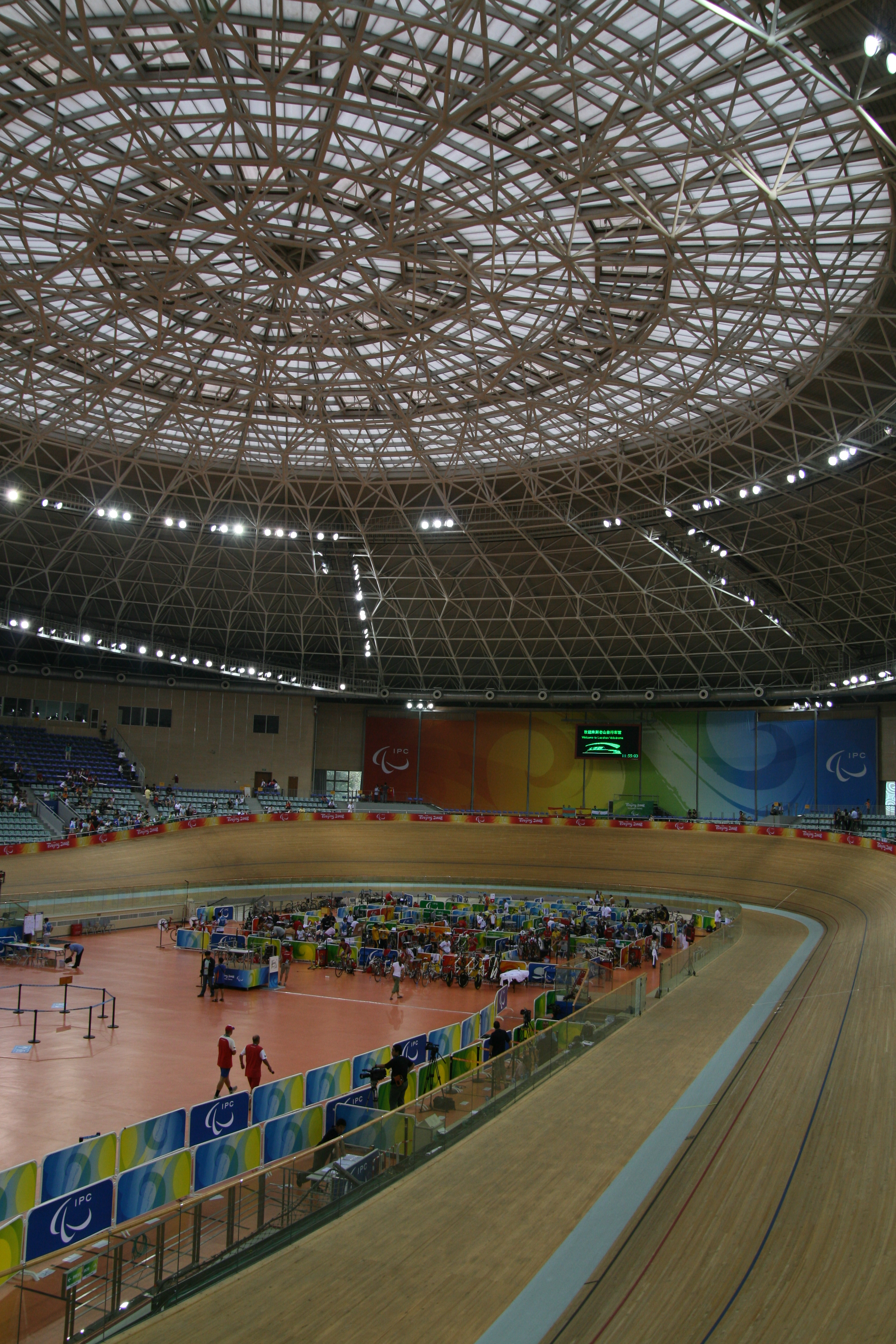
- The velodrome
- Venue: Laoshan Velodrome
- Date: August 16
- Competitors: 23 from 23 nations
- Winning score: 60

Medalists
1st place, gold medalist(s)		Joan Llaneras; Spain
2nd place, silver medalist(s)		Roger Kluge; Germany
3rd place, bronze medalist(s)		Chris Newton; Great Britain

The men's points race at the 2008 Summer Olympics took place on August 16 at the Laoshan Velodrome. There were 23 competitors from 23 nations. The event was won by Joan Llaneras of Spain, his second victory in the points race (after 2000) and third consecutive medal in the event (with a silver in 2004). Llaneras was the only person, of any gender, to win multiple medals in the points race, which is no longer on the Olympic programme. His two gold medals made Spain only the second nation to win multiple golds in the men's event; Italy had three (as well as one in the women's event). Silver went to Roger Kluge of Germany. Great Britain earned its first medal in the men's points race with Chris Newton's bronze.

== Background ==
This was the eighth and final appearance of the event, which would be replaced by the Omnium in 2012 (a multi-component event that concludes with a points race). It was first held in 1900 and not again until 1984; after that, it was held every Summer Games until 2008 when it was removed from the programme. The women's version was held from 1996 through 2008.

12 of the 23 cyclists from the 2004 Games returned: gold medalist Mikhail Ignatiev of Russia, silver medalist (and 2000 gold medalist) Joan Llaneras of Spain, fourth-place finisher Greg Henderson of New Zealand, fifth-place finisher Milan Kadlec of the Czech Republic, seventh-place finisher Peter Schep of the Netherlands, eighth-place finisher Angelo Ciccone of Italy, ninth-place finisher (and 2000 silver medalist) Milton Wynants of Uruguay, eleventh-place finisher Marco Arriagada of Chile, thirteenth-place finisher (and 1996 and 2000 competitor) Juan Curuchet of Argentina, sixteenth-place finisher (and 2000 competitor) Makoto Iijima of Japan, twentieth-place finisher Wong Kam Po of Hong Kong, and non-finisher Chris Newton of Great Britain. In addition to Llaneras and Wynants, veterans of the 2000 competition were Curuchet, Iijima, and Wong; Curuchet had also competed in 1996.

Llaneras won the World Championship in 1996, 1998, 2000, and 2007. Newton was the 2002 World Champion. Volodymyr Rybin of Ukraine had won in 2005, Peter Schep of the Netherlands in 2006, and Vasil Kiryienka of Belarus in 2008. Among the medal favorites were Llaneras, Kiryienka, and the defending Olympic champion Ignatiev.

For the only time in the eight-appearance history of the event, no nations made their debut in the event. France and Italy both competed for the eighth time, the only nations to have competed in all eight Olympic men's points races.

== Qualification ==
Each National Olympic Committee (NOC) could qualify 1 cyclist; there were a maximum of 25 quota places, though only 23 were ultimately used in 2008. The reigning World Champion (Kiryienka of Belarus), World Cup leader (Newton of Great Britain), and "B" World Champion (Radoslav Konstantinov of Bulgaria) received quota places. Each of the 16 nations that had qualified in the men's Madison competition also received a place (reduced to 15 because Great Britain qualified in the Madison but Newton already qualified). There was also six spots available through UCI rankings to nations that had not yet qualified.

Switzerland had a Madison team but did not use its points race place. Konstantinov withdrew and was replaced through an additional UCI ranking place.

== Competition format ==
This track cycling event consisted of a single race in which the cyclist with the most points at the end of the race won. This race was a 40 kilometre, 160 lap race. During the race, cyclists could score points in two ways. The first way to score points is to lap the group. Each time a cyclist gained a full lap on the peloton, he scored 20 points. If a cyclist lost a full lap to the peloton, however, he lost 20 points. The other method of scoring points was to place in the intermediate sprints occurring every 10 laps. The first four cyclists in each of the sprints scored points with the first finisher receiving 5 points, the second 3, the third 2, and the fourth 1 point.

== Schedule ==
All times are China Standard Time (UTC+8)

Date	Time	Round
Saturday, 16 August 2008	17:40	Final

== Results ==
Four years earlier, Ignatiev had won by breaking away from the group and finishing a lap ahead of everyone else; this time, he was unable to get away from the peloton.

Llaneras, the sprint points leader in 2004 who took silver due to the lap behind Ignatiev, was among a group of five that broke away after the sixth sprint to take a one-lap lead. Two sprints later, he, Kluge, and Newton gained a second lap; they would not be caught, essentially assuring the three men the medals. Llaneras won three sprints shortly thereafter, building a large lead over the other two leaders. That lead held to the end, with the Spaniard holding an insurmountable advantage going into the final sprint, which he did not contest. Kluge won the final sprint to move ahead of Newton for the silver medal.

Rank	Cyclist	Nation	Sprint points	Extra laps (20 pts each)	Total points
1st place, gold medalist(s)	Joan Llaneras	Spain	20	2	60
2nd place, silver medalist(s)	Roger Kluge	Germany	18	2	58
3rd place, bronze medalist(s)	Chris Newton	Great Britain	16	2	56
4	Cameron Meyer	Australia	16	1	36
5	Vasil Kiryienka	Belarus	14	1	34
6	Daniel Kreutzfeldt	Denmark	9	1	29
7	Zachary Bell	Canada	7	1	27
8	Makoto Iijima	Japan	3	1	23
9	Milan Kadlec	Czech Republic	0	1	20
10	Greg Henderson	New Zealand	13	0	13
11	Rafał Ratajczyk	Poland	10	0	10
12	Iljo Keisse	Belgium	8	0	8
13	Angelo Ciccone	Italy	8	0	8
14	Volodymyr Rybin	Ukraine	8	0	8
15	Wong Kam Po	Hong Kong	5	0	5
16	Milton Wynants	Uruguay	5	0	5
17	Mikhail Ignatiev	Russia	4	0	4
18	Juan Curuchet	Argentina	1	0	1
19	Marco Arriagada	Chile	1	0	1
20	Peter Schep	Netherlands	0	0	0
21	Christophe Riblon	France	3	-1	-17
—	Bobby Lea	United States	DNF		
—	Feng Chun-Kai	Chinese Taipei	DNF		
