= 2010 European Track Championships – Men's madison =

Sports event

UEC European Champion jersey

The men's madison was one of the 6 men's events at the 2010 European Track Championships, held in Pruszków, Poland. Eighteen teams participated in the contest, which was held on November 7.

== Results ==
Rank	Nation	Cyclist 1	Cyclist 2	Points	Laps
1st place, gold medalist(s)	Czech Republic	Martin Bláha	Jiří Hochmann	9	0
2nd place, silver medalist(s)	Belgium	Kenny De Ketele	Tim Mertens	19	-1
3rd place, bronze medalist(s)	Ukraine	Mykhaylo Radionov	Sergiy Lagkuti	1	-1
4	France	Jonathan Mouchel	Morgan Kneisky	9	0
5	Germany	Erik Mohs	Marcel Kalz	12	-2
6	Italy	Fabio Masotti	Angelo Ciccone	12	-2
7	Russia	Alexei Markov	Alexey Shmidt	10	-2
8	Czech Republic	Milan Kadlec	Alois Kaňkovský	8	-2
9	Netherlands	Peter Schep	Sipke Zijlstra	5	-2
10	Spain	Asier Maeztu	Unai Elorriaga	5	-2
11	Switzerland	Kilian Moser	Claudio Imhof	4	-2
12	Belgium	Ingmar De Poortere	Nicky Cocquyt	3	-2
13	Poland	Łukasz Bujko	Dawid Glowacki	2	-2
14	Switzerland	Loïc Perizzolo	Cyrille Thièry	0	-2
15	Italy	Alessandro De Marchi	Omar Bertazzo	0	-3
15	Spain	Pablo Bernal	Sebastián Mora	7	-2
15	Hungary	Gergely Ivanics	Krisztián Lovassy	0	-4
15	Ukraine	Lyubomyr Polatayko	Roman Kononenko	0	-3
