= 2013 UCI Track Cycling World Championships – Men's madison =

Rainbow jersey

The Men's madison at the 2013 UCI Track Cycling World Championships was held on February 24, 2013. 17 teams participated in the contest. The competition consisted of 200 laps, making a total of 50 km (31.1 mi).

== Medalists ==
Gold	France; Vivien Brisse; Morgan Kneisky
Silver	Spain; David Muntaner; Albert Torres
Bronze	Germany; Henning Bommel; Theo Reinhardt

== Results ==
The race was held at 15:35.

Rank	Name	Nation	Points	Laps down
1st place, gold medalist(s)	Vivien Brisse; Morgan Kneisky	France	18	0
2nd place, silver medalist(s)	David Muntaner; Albert Torres	Spain	15	0
3rd place, bronze medalist(s)	Henning Bommel; Theo Reinhardt	Germany	13	0
4	Angelo Ciccone; Liam Bertazzo	Italy	12	−1
5	Roman Lutsyshyn; Mykhaylo Radionov	Ukraine	10	−1
6	Vojtěch Hačecký; Jiří Hochmann	Czech Republic	9	−1
7	Silvan Dillier; Tristan Marguet	Switzerland	9	−1
8	Kenny De Ketele; Gijs Van Hoecke	Belgium	7	−1
9	Andreas Graf; Andreas Müller	Austria	3	−1
10	Jesper Morkov; Mathias Møller Nielsen	Denmark	2	−1
11	Owain Doull; Simon Yates	Great Britain	2	−1
12	Wim Stroetinga; Peter Schep	Netherlands	2	−1
13	Kwok Ho Ting; King Lok Cheung	Hong Kong	0	−1
14	Evgeny Kovalev; Ivan Kovalev	Russia	0	−1
15	Glenn O'Shea; Alex Edmondson	Australia	0	−1
	Artyom Zakharov; Dias Omirzakov	Kazakhstan	DNF	
	José Ramon Infante Aguirre; Diego Yépez Arellano	Mexico	DNF	
