= 2014 UCI Track Cycling World Championships – Men's madison =

The Men's madison at the 2014 UCI Track Cycling World Championships was held on 2 March 2014. 15 teams participated in the contest, which was contested over 200 laps, equating to a distance of 50 km (31.1 mi).

There was confusion at the end of the race as the Belgian pairing of Jasper de Buyst and Kenny De Ketele celebrated victory when initially declared to be the winners, including a 'final' scoreboard presenting their victory, being cheered by the public, congratulated by the Spaniards and interviewed by the press as winners. But it emerged shortly afterwards that the win had gone to Spain's David Muntaner Juaneda and Albert Torres Barcelo instead. Commissaires held that Spain, as well as (now) silver medallists Czech Republic, Switzerland, who would become third and (now) fourth-placed Austria, had all gained a lap on the field and the Belgians had not succeeded in reaching the back of the peloton when during these last 30 laps, specifically during the last 10, part of the pairings was riding scattered over the track.

== Medalists ==
Gold	Spain; David Muntaner; Albert Torres
Silver	Czech Republic; Martin Blàha; Vojtěch Hačecký
Bronze	Switzerland; Stefan Küng; Théry Schir

== Results ==
The race was held at 17:35.

Rank	Name	Nation	Points	Laps down
1st place, gold medalist(s)	David Muntaner; Albert Torres	Spain	18	
2nd place, silver medalist(s)	Martin Blàha; Vojtěch Hačecký	Czech Republic	12	
3rd place, bronze medalist(s)	Stefan Küng; Théry Schir	Switzerland	7	
4	Andreas Graf; Andreas Müller	Austria	2	
5	Jasper De Buyst; Kenny De Ketele	Belgium	31	−1
6	Marco Coledan; Elia Viviani	Italy	12	−1
7	Henning Bommel; Theo Reinhardt	Germany	10	−1
8	Shane Archbold; Thomas Scully	New Zealand	10	−1
9	Artur Ershov; Alexander Serov	Russia	1	−1
10	Thomas Boudat; Vivien Brisse	France	1	−1
11	Juan Esteban Arango; Edwin Ávila	Colombia	0	−1
12	José Aguirre; Diego Yepez	Mexico	0	−2
13	Cheung King Lok; Leung Chun Wing	Hong Kong	2	−3
14	Alex Edmondson; Glenn O'Shea	Australia	4	−4
15	Jonathan Dibben; Owain Doull	Great Britain	0	−4

The average speed of the race was 54.784 km/h (34.0 mph).
