= 2010 UCI Track Cycling World Championships – Men's points race =

Rainbow jersey

The Men's Points Race is one of the 10 men's events at the 2010 UCI Track Cycling World Championships, held in Ballerup, Denmark.

21 Cyclists participated in the contest. The Final was held on 24 March.

== Results ==
Rank	Name	Nation	Sprint points	Lap points	Total points
1st place, gold medalist(s)	Cameron Meyer	Australia	30	40	70
2nd place, silver medalist(s)	Peter Schep	Netherlands	13	20	33
3rd place, bronze medalist(s)	Milan Kadlec	Czech Republic	7	20	27
4	Chris Newton	Great Britain	26	0	26
5	Ingmar De Poortere	Belgium	4	20	24
6	Christophe Riblon	France	17	0	17
7	Walter Pérez	Argentina	13	0	13
8	Roger Kluge	Germany	13	0	13
9	Daniel Kreutzfeldt	Denmark	10	0	10
10	Makoto Iijima	Japan	8	0	8
11	Andreas Müller	Austria	8	0	8
12	Carlos Torrent Tarres	Spain	5	0	5
13	Lukasz Bujko	Poland	3	0	3
14	Angelo Ciccone	Italy	3	0	3
15	Kwok Ho Ting	Hong Kong	0	0	0
16	Tristan Marguet	Switzerland	1	-20	-19
	Zachary Bell	Canada	5	-20	DNF
	Ioannis Tamouridis	Greece	0	0	DNF
	Thomas Scully	New Zealand	5	-20	DNF
	Artur Ershov	Russia	5	-20	DNF
	José Ramon Infante Aguirre	Mexico			DNS
