= 2014 UEC European Track Championships – Men's madison =

Men's madison at the 2014 UEC European Track Championships
- UEC European Champion jersey
- Venue: Vélodrome Amédée Détraux, Baie-Mahault
- Date: 19 October
- Competitors: 24 from 12 nations

Medalists
| gold medal | Andreas Graf; Andreas Müller | Austria |
| silver medal | Kenny De Ketele; Otto Vergaerde | Belgium |
| bronze medal | Vivien Brisse; Morgan Kneisky | France |

The Men's madison was held on 19 October 2014. 12 teams participated over a distance of 53.3 km (160 laps), with sprints every 20 laps awarding 5, 3, 2 or 1 point to the first four; teams are ranked by lap gains on their opponents, then points between teams on the same lap.

== Results ==
| Rank | Name | Nation | Finish Order | Points | Lap Difference |
|---|---|---|---|---|---|
| 1st place, gold medalist(s) | Andreas Graf; Andreas Müller | Austria | 7 | 6 | |
| 2nd place, silver medalist(s) | Kenny De Ketele; Otto Vergaerde | Belgium | 2 | 21 | -1 |
| 3rd place, bronze medalist(s) | Vivien Brisse; Morgan Kneisky | France | 3 | 18 | -1 |
| 4 | Theo Reinhardt; Leon Rohde | Germany | 1 | 13 | -1 |
| 5 | David Muntaner; Albert Torres | Spain | 4 | 13 | -1 |
| 6 | Roman Gladysh; Vladyslav Kreminskyi | Ukraine | 5 | 6 | -1 |
| 7 | Mark Christian; Owain Doull | Great Britain | 6 | 3 | -1 |
| 8 | Tristan Marguet; Théry Schir | Switzerland | 9 | 2 | -1 |
| 9 | Theo Bos; Wim Stroetinga | Netherlands | 10 | 0 | -1 |
| 10 | Liam Bertazzo; Alex Buttazzoni | Italy | 11 | 4 | -2 |
| 11 | Mateusz Nowak; Adrian Tekliński | Poland | 8 | 2 | −3 |
| — | Raman Tsishkou; Raman Ramanau | Belarus | DNF | | |
