= 2007 UCI Track Cycling World Championships – Men's omnium =

Men's omnium at the 2007 UCI Track Cycling World Championships
- Venue: Palma Arena
- Location: Palma de Mallorca, Spain
- Date: 29 March 2007
- Winning points: 19

Medalists
gold medal	Alois Kaňkovský	Czech Republic
silver medal	Walter Fernando Pérez	Argentina
bronze medal	Charles Bradley Huff	United States

The Men's omnium event of the 2007 UCI Track Cycling World Championships was held on 29 March 2007.

== Results ==
=== 200 m time trial ===
Rank	Name	Nation	Time
1	Michaël D'Almeida	France	10.278
2	Ben Kersten	Australia	10.48
3	Pawel Kosciecha	Poland	10.709
4	Alois Kaňkovský	Czech Republic	10.82
5	Charles Bradley Huff	United States	11.061
6	Panagiotis Keloglou	Greece	11.181
7	Jonathan Bellis	Great Britain	11.213
8	Dimitri De Fauw	Belgium	11.239
9	Walter Fernando Pérez	Argentina	11.291
10	Daniel Kreutzfeldt	Denmark	11.345
11	Karl Christian König	Germany	11.35
12	Robert Slippens	Netherlands	11.385
13	Pedro Jose Vera Alcaraz	Spain	11.394
14	Jesse Sergent	New Zealand	11.57
15	Alexey Shmidt	Russia	11.65
16	Aliaksandr Lisouski	Belarus	11.698
17	Enrico Peruffo	Italy	12.092
DNS	Roman Kononenko	Ukraine	

=== Individual pursuit ===
Rank	Name	Nation	Time
1	Jesse Sergent	New Zealand	3.21.875
2	Alois Kaňkovský	Czech Republic	3.22.686
3	Jonathan Bellis	Great Britain	3.22.863
4	Alexey Shmidt	Russia	3.23.228
5	Robert Slippens	Netherlands	3.23.951
6	Walter Fernando Pérez	Argentina	3.24.691
7	Aliaksandr Lisouski	Belarus	3.24.778
8	Charles Bradley Huff	United States	3.25.408
9	Dimitri De Fauw	Belgium	3.25.793
10	Daniel Kreutzfeldt	Denmark	3.26.541
11	Pedro Jose Vera Alcaraz	Spain	3.28.104
12	Karlchristia König	Germany	3.28.347
13	Enrico Peruffo	Italy	3.29.007
14	Michaël D'Almeida	France	3.31.619
15	Ben Kersten	Australia	3.34.263
16	Panagiotis Keloglou	Greece	3.38.080
17	Pawel Kosciecha	Poland	3.41.503

=== Points race ===
Rank	Name	Nation	Points	Laps down
1	Walter Fernando Pérez	Argentina	30	
2	Daniel Kreutzfeldt	Denmark	27	
3	Jesse Sergent	New Zealand	23	
4	Karl Christian König	Germany	23	
5	Aliaksandr Lisouski	Belarus	18	
6	Enrico Peruffo	Italy	8	1
7	Alexey Shmidt	Russia	5	1
8	Dimitri De Fauw	Belgium	3	1
9	Alois Kaňkovský	Czech Republic	3	1
10	Jonathan Bellis	Great Britain	2	1
11	Robert Slippens	Netherlands	1	1
12	Charles Bradley Huff	United States	0	1
13	Michaël D'Almeida	France	-20	2
14	Panagiotis Keloglou	Greece	-20	2
15	Pedro Jose Vera Alcaraz	Spain	-20	2
16	Pawel Kosciecha	Poland	-40	3
DNS	Ben Kersten	Australia		

=== 1 km time trial ===
Rank	Name	Nation	Time
1	Michaël D'Almeida	France	1.02.40
2	Alois Kaňkovský	Czech Republic	1.04.18
3	Robert Slippens	Netherlands	1.06.02
4	Charles Bradley Huff	United States	1.06.32
5	Aliaksandr Lisouski	Belarus	1.06.49
6	Jonathan Bellis	Great Britain	1.06.66
7	Daniel Kreutzfeldt	Denmark	1.06.69
8	Pawel Kosciecha	Poland	1.07.11
9	Pedro Jose Vera Alcaraz	Spain	1.07.16
10	Dimitri De Fauw	Belgium	1.07.50
11	Walter Fernando Pérez	Argentina	1.07.68
12	Karl Christian König	Germany	1.08.08
13	Panagiotis Keloglou	Greece	1.08.08
14	Alexey Shmidt	Russia	1.08.24
15	Jesse Sergent	New Zealand	1.08.63
16	Enrico Peruffo	Italy	1.09.66

== Overall standings ==
Rank	Name	Nation	Points
1	Alois Kaňkovský	Czech Republic	19
2	Walter Fernando Pérez	Argentina	28
3	Charles Bradley Huff	United States	37
4	Aliaksandr Lisouski	Belarus	37
5	Daniel Kreutzfeldt	Denmark	38
6	Dimitri De Fauw	Belgium	40
7	Michaël D'Almeida	France	41
8	Jonathan Bellis	Great Britain	42
9	Robert Slippens	Netherlands	42
10	Jesse Sergent	New Zealand	43
11	Alexey Shmidt	Russia	43
12	Karl Christian König	Germany	45
13	Enrico Peruffo	Italy	59
14	Pawel Kosciecha	Poland	61
15	Pedro Jose Vera Alcaraz	Spain	63
16	Panagiotis Keloglou	Greece	63
DNF	Ben Kersten	Australia	
