= Cycling at the 2008 Summer Olympics – Men's Madison =

Men's Madison events at the Olympics

Men's Madison at the Games of the XXIX Olympiad
- Olympic Track cycling
- Venue: Laoshan Velodrome
- Date: August 19
- Competitors: 32 from 16 nations

Medalists
1st place, gold medalist(s)		Juan Curuchet; Walter Pérez	Argentina
2nd place, silver medalist(s)		Joan Llaneras; Antonio Tauler	Spain
3rd place, bronze medalist(s)		Mikhail Ignatiev; Alexei Markov	Russia

The men's Madison at the 2008 Summer Olympics was held on 19 August at the Laoshan Velodrome.

This track cycling event consists of a single race. This race is a 50 kilometre, 200 lap race. Cyclists compete in pairs, with one resting as the other rides. Placing is determined first by laps, then by points. Points are awarded based on intermediate sprints held every 20 laps. The first finisher in each sprint earns 5 points, the second gets 3, the third finisher earns 2, and the fourth place cyclist after each sprint gets 1 point. Ties after both laps and points are broken by the placing in the last sprint.

Argentina wins the gold medal.

== Results ==
Rank	Nation	Cyclist 1	Cyclist 2	Points	Laps
1st place, gold medalist(s)	Argentina	Juan Curuchet	Walter Pérez	8	
2nd place, silver medalist(s)	Spain	Joan Llaneras	Antonio Tauler	7	
3rd place, bronze medalist(s)	Russia	Mikhail Ignatiev	Alexei Markov	6	
4	Belgium	Iljo Keisse	Kenny de Ketele	17	−1
5	Germany	Roger Kluge	Olaf Pollack	15	−1
6	Denmark	Michael Mørkøv	Alex Nicki Rasmussen	14	−1
7	France	Matthieu Ladagnous	Jérôme Neuville	12	−1
8	Netherlands	Jens Mouris	Peter Schep	6	−1
9	Great Britain	Mark Cavendish	Bradley Wiggins	6	−1
10	New Zealand	Greg Henderson	Hayden Roulston	5	−1
11	Switzerland	Franco Marvulli	Bruno Risi	3	−1
12	Canada	Zachary Bell	Martin Gilbert	5	−3
13	Czech Republic	Milan Kadlec	Alois Kaňkovský	3	−3
14	Italy	Angelo Ciccone	Fabio Masotti	0	−3
15	Ukraine	Lyubomyr Polatayko	Volodymyr Rybin	0	−3
16	United States	Michael Friedman	Bobby Lea	3	−4
