= Cycling at the 2004 Summer Olympics – Men's points race =

Cycling at the Olympics

Men's points race at the Games of the XXVIII Olympiad
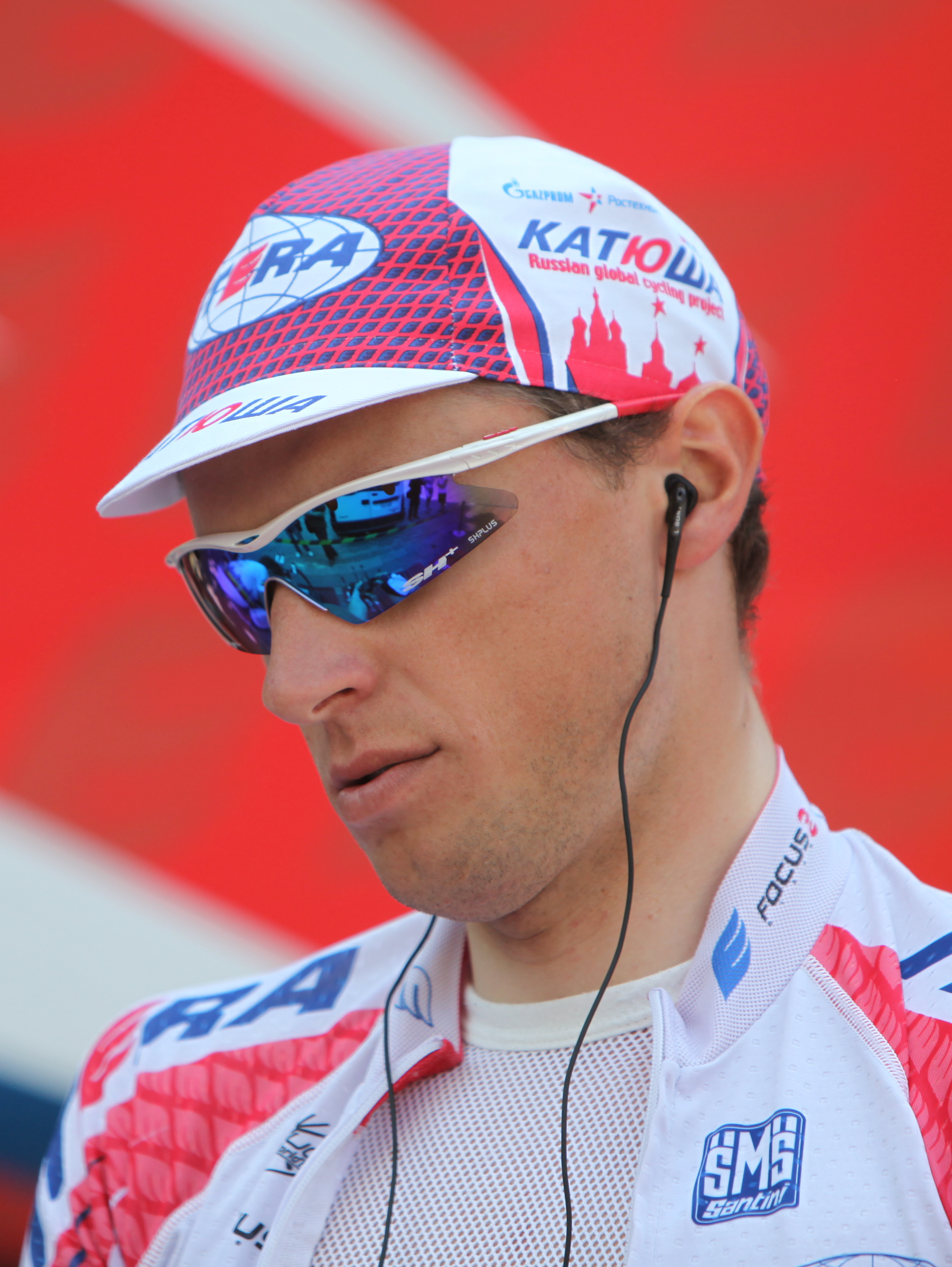
- Mikhail Ignatiev (2011)
- Venue: Athens Olympic Velodrome
- Date: 24 August
- Competitors: 23 from 23 nations
- Winning score: 93

Medalists
1st place, gold medalist(s)		Mikhail Ignatiev; Russia
2nd place, silver medalist(s)		Joan Llaneras; Spain
3rd place, bronze medalist(s)		Guido Fulst; Germany

The men's points race in cycling at the 2004 Summer Olympics consisted of a 160 lap (40 kilometre) points race with 16 sprints where points were awarded. The event was held on 24 August 2004 at the Athens Olympic Velodrome. There were 23 competitors from 23 nations, with each nation limited to one cyclist in the event. The event was won by Mikhail Ignatiev of Russia, the nation's first victory in the men's points race. Spain's Joan Llaneras, the defending champion, took silver; he was the first and only person (of any gender) to win multiple medals in the relatively short-lived points race, and ended with three medals after another gold in 2008. Guido Fulst of Germany took bronze, the first medal in the event for that nation since 1900.

== Background ==
This was the seventh appearance of the event. It was first held in 1900 and not again until 1984; after that, it was held every Summer Games until 2008 when it was removed from the programme. The women's version was held from 1996 through 2008.

8 of the 23 cyclists from the 2000 Games returned: gold medalist Joan Llaneras of Spain, silver medalist Milton Wynants of Uruguay, sixth-place finisher Franz Stocher of Austria, eleventh-place finisher Wong Kam Po of Hong Kong, fourteenth-place finisher Juan Curuchet of Argentina, fifteenth-place finisher Matthew Gilmore of Belgium, sixteenth-place finisher Makoto Iijima of Japan, and seventeenth-place finisher Vasyl Yakovlev of Ukraine. Llaneras, Wynants, Stocher, Curuchet, and Yakovlev had all competed in 1996 as well; Yakovlev was on his fourth Games.

Llaneras won the World Championships in 1996, 1998, and 2000. Chris Newton of Great Britain was the 2002 World Champion. Stocher won in 2003, with Llaneras in second. Franck Perque of France was the reigning (2004) champion.

Belarus and the Czech Republic each made their debut in the event. France and Italy both competed for the seventh time, the only nations to have competed in all seven Olympic men's points races.

== Competition format ==
The format changed slightly from previous incarnations of the Olympic points race. The event was still a single race at 40 kilometres distance, with points for 16 sprints (every 2.5 kilometres). The scoring of laps changed, however. Rather than riders a lap behind the leaders being automatically placed behind them, and unable to score sprint points, now cyclists earned a 20-point bonus for each lap ahead. This bonus was large enough that it had largely the same result in practice.

5 points were given to the first finisher of each sprint, with 3 going to the second-place finisher, 2 going to the third place cyclist, and 1 going to the fourth place rider. Cyclists could also score points by lapping the main body of riders, known as the peloton. 20 points were gained by doing this, while 20 points were lost if the peloton lapped the cyclist.

== Schedule ==
All times are Greece Standard Time (UTC+2)

Date	Time	Round
Tuesday, 24 August 2004	17:30	Final

== Results ==
Ignatiev got a lap ahead of everyone else, giving him a 20-point advantage over the four-man chase group. Llaneras finished strong, winning 3 of the last 4 laps for 15 points. This gave him a total of 22 sprint points, most in the field and 9 more than Ignatiev, but the lap difference kept the Spaniard in second place.

Rank	Cyclist	Nation	Sprint points	Extra laps (20 pts each)	Total points
1st place, gold medalist(s)	Mikhail Ignatiev	Russia	13	4	93
2nd place, silver medalist(s)	Joan Llaneras	Spain	22	3	82
3rd place, bronze medalist(s)	Guido Fulst	Germany	19	3	79
4	Greg Henderson	New Zealand	18	3	68
5	Milan Kadlec	Czech Republic	15	3	65
6	Mark Renshaw	Australia	20	2	60
7	Peter Schep	Netherlands	18	2	58
8	Angelo Ciccone	Italy	9	2	49
9	Milton Wynants	Uruguay	6	2	46
10	Franck Perque	France	3	2	43
11	Marco Arriagada	Chile	5	1	25
12	Yauheni Sobal	Belarus	4	1	24
13	Juan Curuchet	Argentina	3	1	23
14	Colby Pearce	United States	3	1	23
15	Alexey Kolessov	Kazakhstan	2	1	22
16	Makoto Iijima	Japan	13	0	13
17	Franz Stocher	Austria	9	0	9
18	Matthew Gilmore	Belgium	7	0	7
19	Vasyl Yakovlev	Ukraine	3	0	3
20	Wong Kam Po	Hong Kong	2	0	2
—	Chris Newton	Great Britain	DNF		
—	Mahdi Sohrabi	Iran	DNF		
—	Tomas Vaitkus	Lithuania	DNF		
