= 2009 UCI Track Cycling World Championships – Men's scratch =

Men's scratch at the 2009 UCI Track Cycling World Championships
- Venue: BGŻ Arena, Pruszków
- Date: 26 March 2009

The Men's scratch event of the 2009 UCI Track Cycling World Championships was held on 26 March 2009.

== Results ==
Rank	Name	Nation
1	Morgan Kneisky	France
2	Ángel Dario Colla	Argentina
3	Andreas Mueller	Austria
4	Travis Meyer	Australia
5	Kazuhiro Mori	Japan
6	Ivan Kovalev	Russia
7	Mark Cavendish	United Kingdom
8	Hayden Godfrey	New Zealand
9	Aliaksandr Lisouski	Belarus
10	Carlos Urán	Colombia
11	Alex Buttazzoni	Italy
12	Marcel Kalz	Germany
13	Jiří Hochmann	Czech Republic
14	Jozef Žabka	Slovakia
15	Ho Ting Kwok	Hong Kong
16	Zachary Bell	Canada
17	Tim Mertens	Belgium
18	Daniel Holloway	United States
19	Rafał Ratajczyk	Poland
20	Wim Stroetinga	Netherlands
21	Franco Marvulli	Switzerland
DNF	Iban Leanizbarrutia Cruz	Spain
