= Team Dukla Praha (men's team) =

Czech cycling team

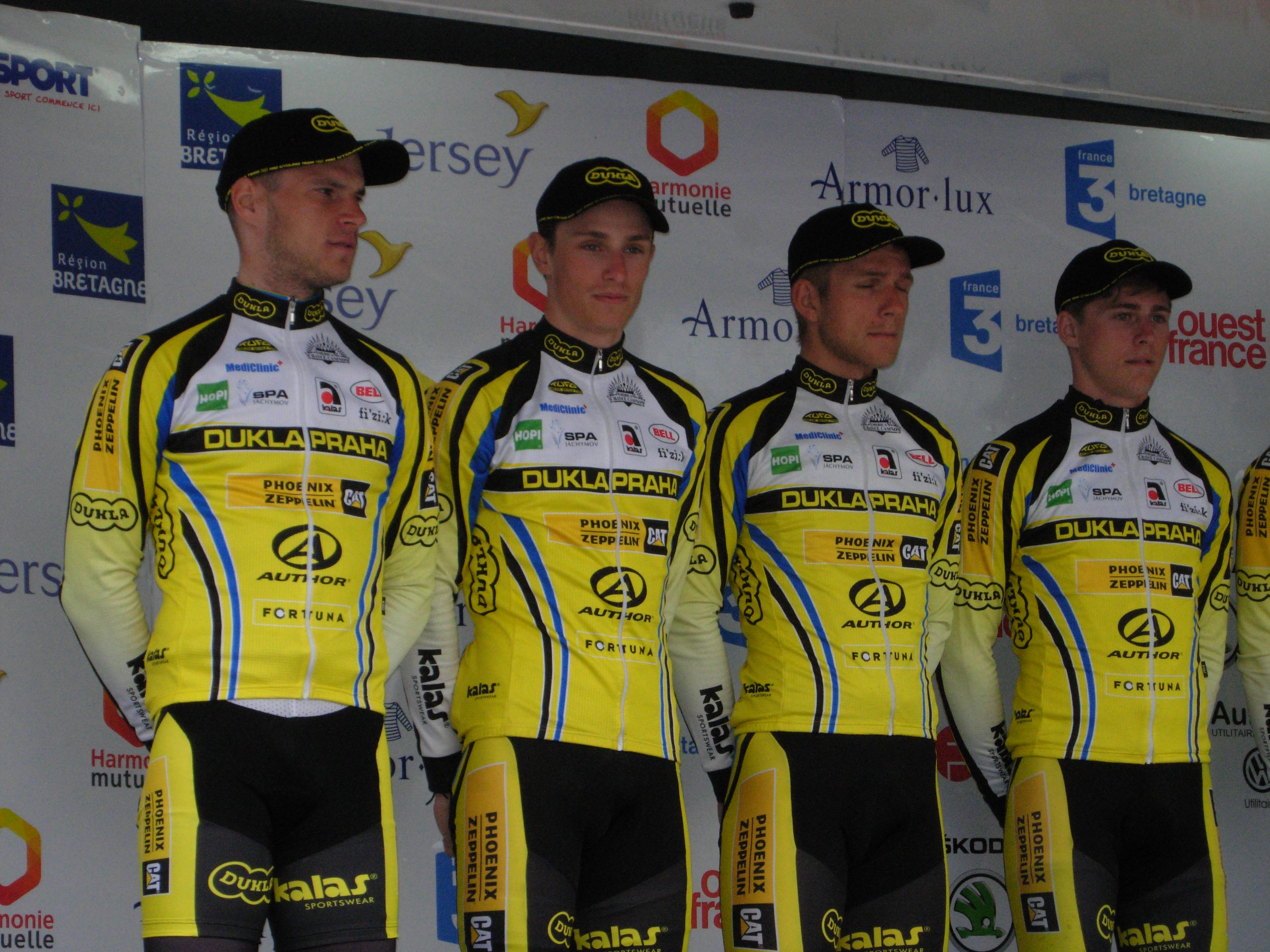

Team information
- UCI code: ADP
- Registered: Czech Republic
- Founded: 2003
- Discipline: Road
- Status: UCI Continental (2003, 2005–2007, 2011–2016, 2018); Club (2004, 2008–2010, 2017, 2019–)

Team name history
- 2003–2013 2014–: ASC Dukla Praha; Team Dukla Praha

Team Dukla Praha is a Czech cycling team founded in 2003. It participates in UCI Continental Circuits races. In 2019, the team downgraded to club status.

== Doping ==
On 18 September 2015, the Czech Cycling Federation announced that 22 year old track cyclist Ondřej Rybín (Czech Republic) had been handed a 4-year ban from sports after he'd tested positive for EPO in an out-of-competition control in June. Rybin had won bronze in the scratch race at the 2015 European Track Championships (under-23 & junior) in July, a race he was set to be disqualified from after the positive from June was revealed.

== 2016 Roster ==
Rider	Date of birth
Šimon Adámek (CZE)	October 16, 1995 (age 30)
Martin Bláha (CZE)	September 12, 1977 (age 48)
Roman Fürst (CZE)	May 5, 1991 (age 35)
Jiří Ježek (CZE)	October 16, 1974 (age 51)
Michal Kohout (CZE)	January 18, 1996 (age 30)
Jan Kraus (CZE)	January 23, 1993 (age 33)

Rider	Date of birth
Nicolas Pietrula (CZE)	August 5, 1995 (age 31)
Matěj Prudek (CZE)	March 13, 1997 (age 29)
Matyáš Strupek (CZE)	April 3, 1993 (age 33)
Jan Vastl (CZE)	December 19, 1995 (age 30)
Ondřej Vendolský (CZE)	July 12, 1991 (age 35)

== Major wins ==
2011
Stage 1 Szlakiem Grodów Piastowskich, Jiří Hochmann
Stages 2 & 4 Tour of Taihu Lake, Alois Kaňkovský
2012
Stages 2 & 3 Azerbaijan International Cycling Tour, Alois Kaňkovský
Stage 6 Azerbaijan International Cycling Tour, Vojtěch Hačecký
Czech Republic National Road Race championships, Milan Kadlec
Grand Prix Kralovehradeckeho kraje, Martin Hačecký
Overall Okolo Jižních Čech, Jiří Hochmann

Stage 1, Jiří Hochmann

Overall Tour of Taihu Lake, Milan Kadlec

Stage 1, Milan Kadlec
Stages 2 & 8, Alois Kaňkovský

Stage 1 Tour of Fuzhou, Alois Kaňkovský
Stage 3 Tour of Fuzhou, Milan Kadlec
2013
Stages 2, 3 & 4 Tour of Iran, Alois Kaňkovský
Stage 6 Tour of Iran, Milan Kadlec
Stages 1 & 3 Tour of China I, Alois Kaňkovský
Overall Tour of China II, Alois Kaňkovský

Stages 2, 3 & 4, Alois Kaňkovský

Stages 5 & 7 Tour of Taihu Lake, Alois Kaňkovský
Tour of Nanjing, Alois Kaňkovský
Stage 3 Tour of Fuzhou, Jiří Hochmann
2014
Stage 3 Tour of Iran, Milan Kadlec
Stage 2 Tour of Taihu Lake, Alois Kaňkovský
2015
Korona Kocich Gór, František Sisr
