= Fabio Masotti =

Italian cyclist

Personal information
- Full name: Fabio Masotti
- Born: 3 June 1974 (age 52) Udine, Italy
- Height: 1.70 m (5 ft 7 in)
- Weight: 68 kg (150 lb)

Cycling career
- Sport: Cycling
- Current team: Gruppo Sportivo Fiamme Azzurre
- Disciplines: Road, track
- Role: Rider

Professional teams
- 2010: San Marco Concrete Imet Caneva
- 2012: Gruppo Sportivo Fiamme Azzurre

Fabio Masotti (born 3 June 1974 in Udine) is an Italian amateur road and track cyclist. He has claimed four Italian national championship titles in track cycling (madison, and points race), and later represented his nation Italy at the 2008 Summer Olympics. Masotti also shared silver medals with 2000 Olympic medalist Marco Villa in men's Madison at the fourth round of the 2006 UCI World Cup circuit in Sydney, Australia. Masotti currently races for the 2013 season with Gruppo Sportivo Fiamme Azzurre under his head coach Cristiano Valoppi.

Masotti qualified for the Italian squad, as a 34-year-old in men's Madison at the 2008 Summer Olympics in Beijing by receiving an automatic berth from UCI based on his top-ten performance in the Track World Rankings. Teaming with two-time Olympian Angelo Ciccone, Masotti started out a 50 km, sixteen-sprint race for the Italian duo by taking the lap first over the entire field, but did not receive a single point and lost three laps in all sprints, dropping him and his partner off to fourteenth place.

== Career highlights ==
2004
1st Italian Track Cycling Championships (Madison with Angelo Ciccone), Pordenone (ITA)
1st Italian Track Cycling Championships (Points race), Pordenone (ITA)
2nd Stage 1, Giro del Friuli, Sistiana (ITA)
2005
1st Italian Track Cycling Championships (Scratch), San Vincenzo (ITA)
2006
1st Stage 2, Cinturón Ciclista Internacional a Mallorca, Palma de Mallorca (ESP)
(silver) Stage 4, UCI World Cup (Madison with Marco Villa), Sydney (AUS)
3rd Coppa San Vito, San Vito al Tagliamento (ITA)
2007
1st Italian Track Cycling Championships (Madison with Angelo Ciccone), Dalmine (ITA)
2nd Italian Track Cycling Championships (Scratch), Dalmine (ITA)
(bronze) Athens Open Balkan Championships (Points race), Athens (ESP)
3rd Coppa San Vito, San Vito al Tagliamento (ITA)
3rd Italian Track Cycling Championships (Scratch), Dalmine (ITA)
2008
14th Olympic Games (Madison with Angelo Ciccone), Beijing (CHN)
2009
2nd Stage 2, Tour of Romania, Bacau (ROU)
4th Stage 1, Tour of Romania, Braila (ROU)
2010
3rd Stage 1, Tour of Romania, Targu-Mures (ROU)
6th European Championships (Madison with Angelo Ciccone), Pruszków (POL)
2011
1st Stage 8, Tour of Romania, Bucharest (ROU)
2nd Italian Track Cycling Championships (Madison with Angelo Ciccone), Italy
3rd Stage 1, Tour of Romania, Braila (ROU)
4th Stage 4, Tour of Romania, Suceava (ROU)
