= Martin Bláha =

Czech cyclist

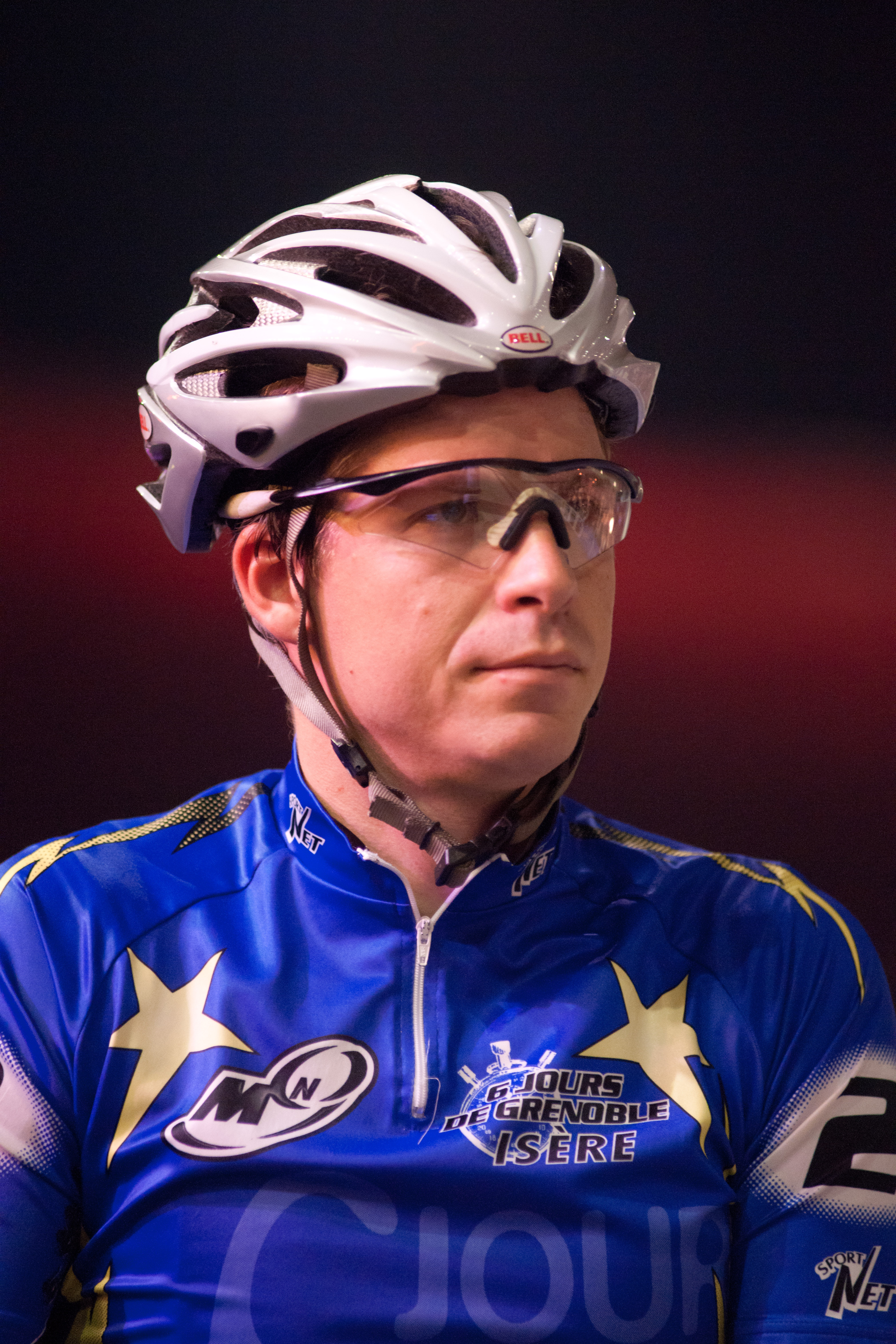
- Bláha in 2011

Personal information
- Full name: Martin Bláha
- Born: 12 September 1977 (age 49): Brno, Czechoslovakia; (now Czech Republic)

Cycling career
- Sport: Cycling
- Current team: Retired
- Disciplines: Track; Road
- Role: Rider

Amateur teams
- 2004: ASC Dukla Praha
- 2008–2010: ASC Dukla Praha
- 2017: Team Dukla Praha

Professional teams
- 2003: ASC Dukla Praha
- 2005–2007: ASC Dukla Praha
- 2011–2016: ASC Dukla Praha
Medal record
Representing Czech Republic
Men's track cycling
World Championships
Silver medal – second place	2011 Apeldoorn	Madison
Silver medal – second place	2014 Cali	Madison
Bronze medal – third place	2009 Pruszków	Madison
European Championships
Gold medal – first place	2010 Pruszków	Madison
Gold medal – first place	2012 Panevėžys	Madison

Martin Bláha (born 12 September 1977) is a Czech former professional racing cyclist. He rode at the 2014 and 2015 UCI Track Cycling World Championships.

== Major results ==
1995
3rd Team pursuit, UCI Junior Track World Championships
2009
3rd Madison, UCI Track Cycling World Championships (with Jiří Hochmann)
2010
1st Madison, UEC European Track Championships
2011
1st Points race, National Track Championships
2nd Madison, UCI Track Cycling World Championships (with Jiří Hochmann)
2012
1st Madison, UEC European Track Championships
2014
2nd Madison, UCI Track Cycling World Championships (with Vojtěch Hačecký)
8th Tour of Yancheng Coastal Wetlands
2015
National Track Championships

1st Scratch
1st Team pursuit

5th Overall Tour of Yancheng Coastal Wetlands
2017
1st Scratch, National Track Championships
7th GP Slovakia, Visegrad 4 Bicycle Race
