= Christian Kux =

German road bicycle racer (born 1985)

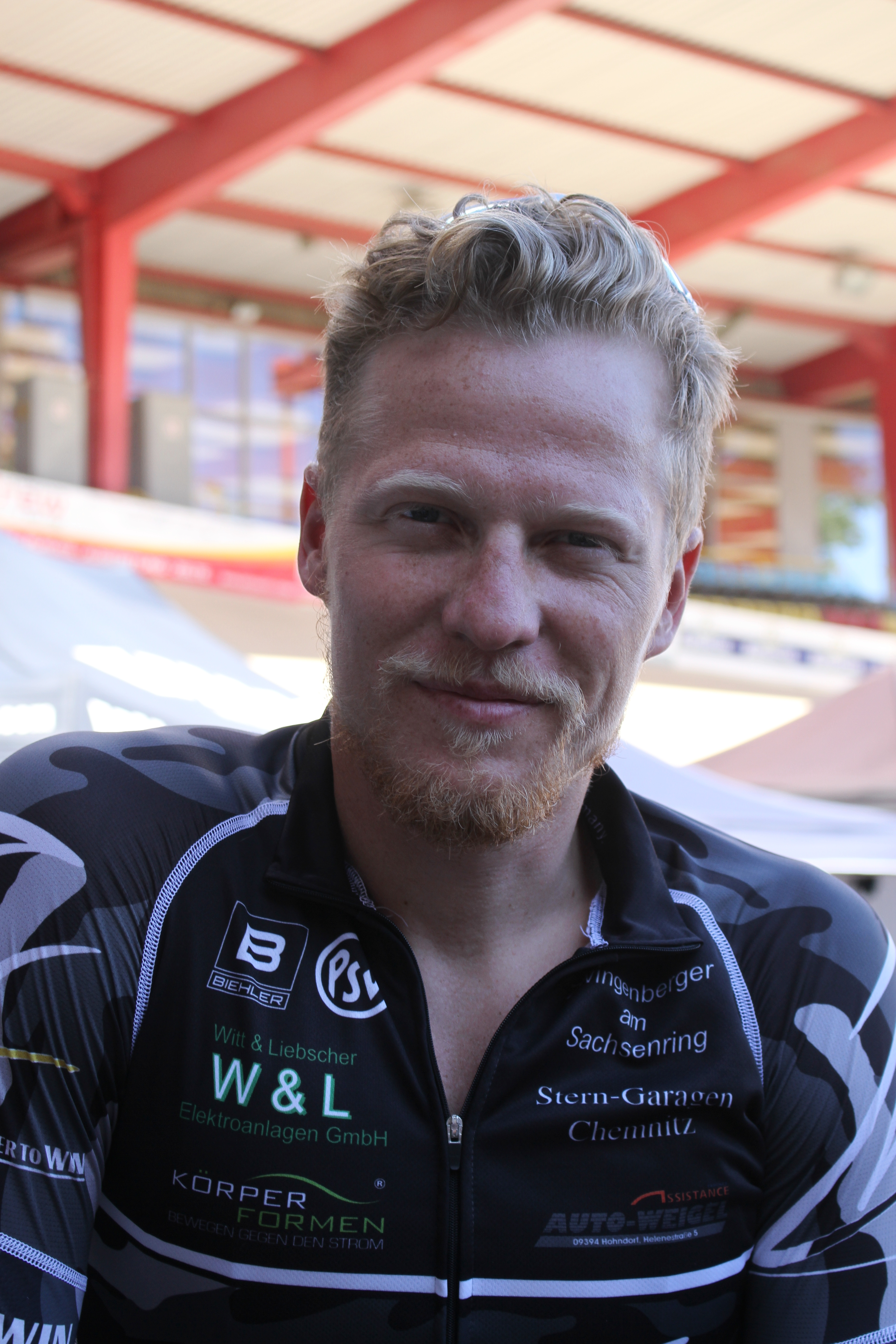

Personal information
- Full name: Christian Kux
- Born: 3 May 1985 (age 41) Chemnitz, East-Germany

Cycling career
- Sport: Cycling
- Current team: Unattached
- Discipline: Road
- Role: Rider

Amateur team
- 2006–2007: Continental Team Milram

Professional team
- 2008–2009: Team Milram

Christian Kux (born 3 May 1985) is a German road bicycle racer.

== Palmares ==
2001
Germany U17 Pursuit Champion
2002
Germany U19 Pursuit Champion
(silver) , European U19 Team Pursuit Championship
3rd, National U19 Team Pursuit & Time Trial Championship
2003
Germany U19 Pursuit Champion
(silver) , World U19 Team Pursuit Championship
2006
1st, UIV Cup, München
2007
1st, Prologue, Thüringen-Rundfahrt (U23)
2nd, National U23 Road Race Championship
2nd, Overall, Brandenburg-Rundfahrt

Winner Stage 5
