= Enrico Peruffo =

Italian bicycle racer

Personal information
- Born: 1 August 1985 (age 41) Moncalieri, Italy

Cycling career
- Sport: Cycling
- Discipline: Road
- Role: Rider

Professional teams
- 2010: Carmiooro NGC
- 2011: Team Vorarlberg
- 2012: Miche–Guerciotti

Enrico Peruffo (born 1 August 1985) is an Italian former road cyclist.

== Major results ==
2003
1st Junior National Road Race Championships
1st Overall Tre Giorni Orobica
1st Stage 2 Giro della Lunigiana
5th Trofeo comune di Vertova
2007
4th Trofeo Franco Balestra
5th Trofeo Alcide Degasperi
6th Gran Premio della Liberazione
2008
9th Memorial Davide Fardelli
2009
1st Road race, Mediterranean Games
1st Stage 6 Girobio
2nd Trofeo Franco Balestra
6th Trofeo Edil C
10th Coppa della Pace
2010
3rd Neuseen Classics
5th Circuito de Getxo
9th Ronde van Drenthe
