= Georg Tazreiter =

Austrian cyclist

Personal information
- Born: 4 March 1986 (age 40)

Cycling career
- Sport: Cycling
- Discipline: Track cycling
- Role: Rider
- Rider type: endurance

Georg Tazreiter (born 4 March 1986) is an Austrian male track cyclist, riding for the national team. He competed in the team pursuit and madison event at the 2010 UCI Track Cycling World Championships.
