= Tour of Nanjing =

Cycle race in Nanjing, China

Race details
- Date: November
- Region: China
- Discipline: Road
- Type: One day race

History
- First edition: 2013
- Editions: 1 (as of 2013)
- First winner: Alois Kaňkovský (CZE)
- Most wins: No repeat winners
- Most recent: Alois Kaňkovský (CZE)

Tour of Nanjing is a men's one-day cycle race which takes place in China and was rated by the UCI as 1.2 and forms part of the UCI Asia Tour.

== Overall winners ==
Year	Winner	Team
2013	(Czech Republic) Alois Kaňkovský	ASC Dukla Praha
