= Jesper Mørkøv =

Danish cyclist (born 1988)

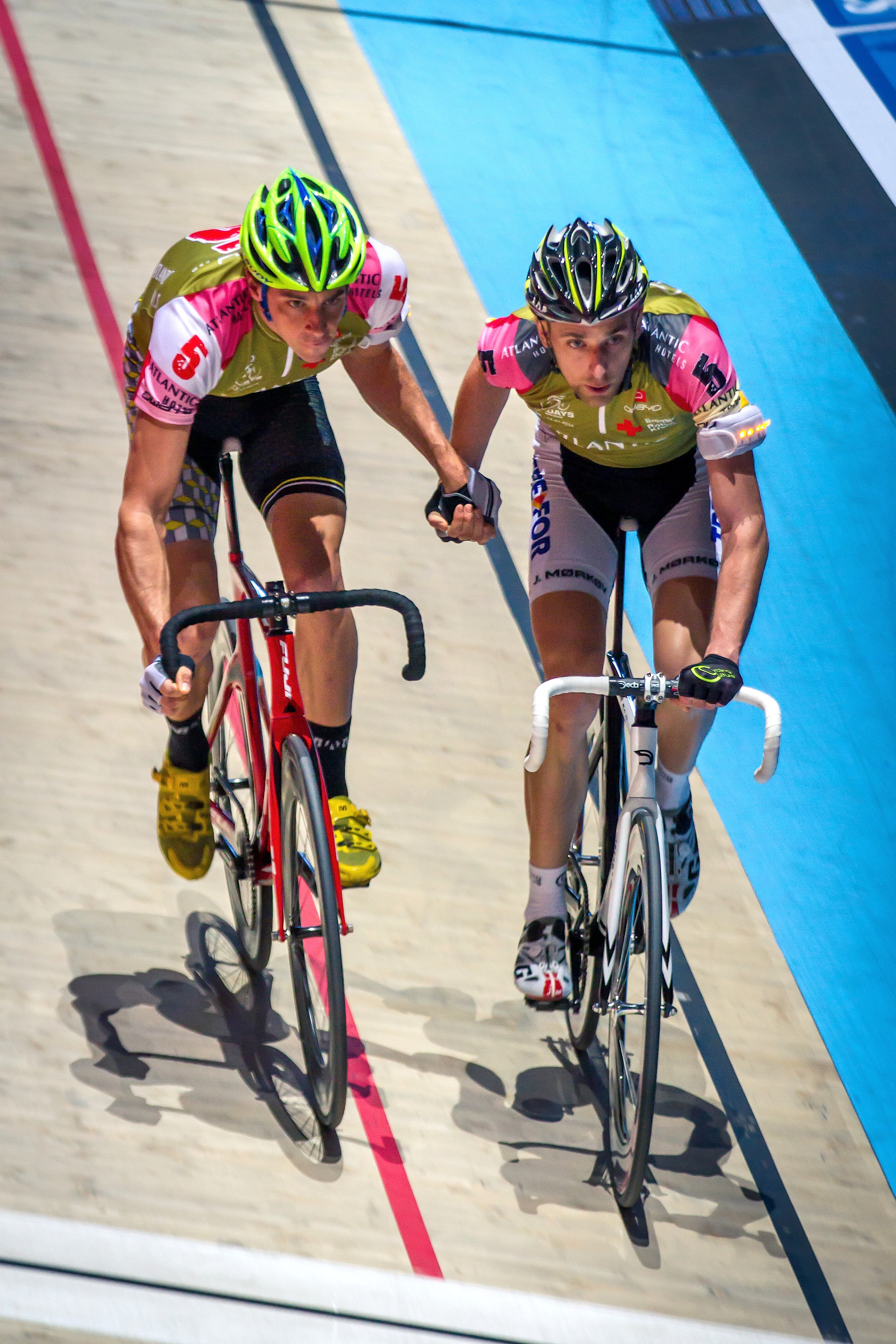
- Jesper Mørkøv, Andreas Graf - Bremen 2014

Personal information
- Born: 11 March 1988 (age 38) Kokkedal, Denmark

Cycling career
- Sport: Cycling
- Disciplines: Track; Road
- Role: Rider
- Rider type: Endurance

Amateur teams
- 2010–2011: Bonnat 91
- 2014: Globeteam–Siesta Homes Group

Professional teams
- 2007–2009: Odense Energi
- 2012: J. Jensen–Sandstød Salg og Event
- 2013: Team TreFor
- 2015–2018: Riwal Platform

Jesper Mørkøv (born 11 March 1988) is a Danish male track and road cyclist, who last rode for UCI Continental team Riwal CeramicSpeed. He competed in the points race and madison events at the 2013 UCI Track Cycling World Championships. He is the brother of racing cyclists Jacob and Michael Mørkøv.
