= Maxime Bally =

Swiss cyclist (born 1986)

Personal information
- Born: 22 October 1986 (age 39)

Cycling career
- Sport: Cycling
- Discipline: Racing
- Role: Rider

Maxime Bally (born 22 October 1986) is a Swiss professional racing cyclist.

== Career wins ==
2005 - Trois Jours d'Aigle (SUI)
2006 - UIV Cup Dortmund, U23 (GER)
2007 - UIV Cup Stuttgart, U23 (GER)
2007 - Soirée professionelle Genève (SUI)
2007 - Professional 6 days Zurich (SUI) 8ème
2007 - Finalist at the World Cup in Sydney
