= Angelo Ciccone =

Italian cyclist (born 1980)

Personal information
- Full name: Angelo Ciccone
- Born: 7 July 1980 (age 46) Cento, Italy
- Height: 1.74 m (5 ft 9 in)
- Weight: 62 kg (137 lb)

Cycling career
- Sport: Cycling
- Current team: Cycling Team Friuli
- Disciplines: Road, track
- Role: Rider

Professional teams
- 2003–2005: Marchiol-Famila-Site
- 2009: Cycling Team Friuli
- 2010: San Marco Concrete Imet Caneva
- 2012: Gruppo Sportivo Fiamme Azzurre
- 2013: Cycling Team Friuli
Medal record
Men's track cycling
Representing Italy
European Championships
Silver medal – second place	2004 Valencia	Omnium
Bronze medal – third place	2003 Moscow	Omnium
Bronze medal – third place	2012 Panevėžys	Madison

Angelo Ciccone (born 7 July 1980) is an Italian amateur road and track cyclist. He has claimed four Italian national championship titles in track cycling (omnium, madison, and points race), and later represented his nation Italy in two editions of the Olympic Games (2004 and 2008). Ciccone currently races for the 2013 season with Cycling Team Friuli under his head coach Roberto Bressan.

Ciccone competed at the 2004 Summer Olympics in Athens, where he scored a total of forty-nine points (the victor got ninety-three) to grab the eighth spot in the men's points race. In that same year, Ciccone also claimed a silver medal in men's omnium at the European Championships in Valencia, Spain, and eventually collected his first two Italian national championship titles in both team pursuit and madison.

At the 2008 Summer Olympics in Beijing, Ciccone qualified for his second Italian squad, as a 28-year-old, in two track cycling events by receiving an automatic berth from UCI based on his top-ten performance in the Track World Rankings. In the men's points race, held on the second day of the program, Ciccone picked up a total of eight points without receiving an extra lap to score a thirteenth place in a 25-km, 10-lap sprint race. Teaming with Fabio Masotti in men's Madison three days later, Ciccone started out a 50 km, sixteen-sprint race for the Italian duo by taking the lap first over the entire field, but did not receive a single point and lost three laps in all sprints, dropping him and his partner off to fourteenth place.

Four years later, at the 2012 European Championships in Panevėžys, Lithuania, Ciccone and his new partner Elia Viviani scored twenty points to end his eight-year medal drought with a bronze in men's Madison, finishing ahead of Swiss duo Tristan Marguet and Silvan Dilier by a three-point margin.

== Career highlights ==
2003
1st Coppa San Geo, Italy
1st Poreč Trophy, Croatia
(bronze) European Championships (Omnium), Moscow (RUS)
2004
1st Italian Track Cycling Championships (Madison with Fabio Masotti), Pordenone (ITA)
1st Italian Track Cycling Championships (Team pursuit), Pordenone (ITA)
2nd Italian Track Cycling Championships (Points race), Pordenone (ITA)
(silver) European Championships (Omnium), Valencia (ESP)
8th Olympic Games (Points race), Athens (GRE)
2005
1st Stage 8, Volta de Ciclismo Internacional do Estado de São Paulo, Campinas (BRA)
2nd Italian Track Cycling Championships (Points race), San Vincenzo (ITA)
3rd Coppa San Vito, Italy
3rd Stage 5, Volta de Ciclismo Internacional do Estado de São Paulo, Bauru (BRA)
3rd Stage 7, Volta de Ciclismo Internacional do Estado de São Paulo, Ribeirão Preto (BRA)
2007
1st Italian Track Cycling Championships (Madison with Fabio Masotti), Dalmine (ITA)
2nd Italian Track Cycling Championships (Derny), Dalmine (ITA)
(silver) Athens Open Balkan Championships (Points race), Athens (ESP)
3rd Italian Track Cycling Championships (Scratch), Dalmine (ITA)
2008
3rd Prologue, Tour of Romania, Romania
13th Olympic Games (Points race), Beijing (CHN)
14th Olympic Games (Madison with Fabio Masotti), Beijing (CHN)
2009
1st Stage 3, Tour of Romania, Botoșani (ROU)
4th Stage 1, Giro del Friuli, Ronchi dei Legionari (ITA)
5th Prologue, Tour of Romania, Constanța (ROU)
2010
1st Prologue, Tour of Romania, Deva (ROU)
(silver) Stage 4, UCI World Cup (Madison with Elia Viviani), Beijing (CHN)
6th European Championships (Madison with Fabio Masotti), Pruszków (POL)
7th UCI World Championships (Madison), Copenhagen (DEN)
11th UCI World Championships (Team pursuit), Copenhagen (DEN)
14th UCI World Championships (Points race), Copenhagen (DEN)
2011
2nd Italian Track Cycling Championships (Points race), Italy
2nd Italian Track Cycling Championships (Madison), Italy
3rd Memorijal Nevio Valčić, Croatia
3rd Overall, Tour of Romania, Romania
2012
1st Italian Track Cycling Championships (Omnium), Pordenone (ITA)
(bronze) European Championships (Madison with Elia Viviani), Panevėžys (LTU)
4th Poreč Trophy, Croatia
6th UCI World Championships (Points race), Melbourne (AUS)
2013
4th UCI World Championships (Madison), Minsk (BLR)
8th UCI World Championships (Points race), Minsk (BLR)
