= Alois Kaňkovský =

Czech cyclist (born 1983)

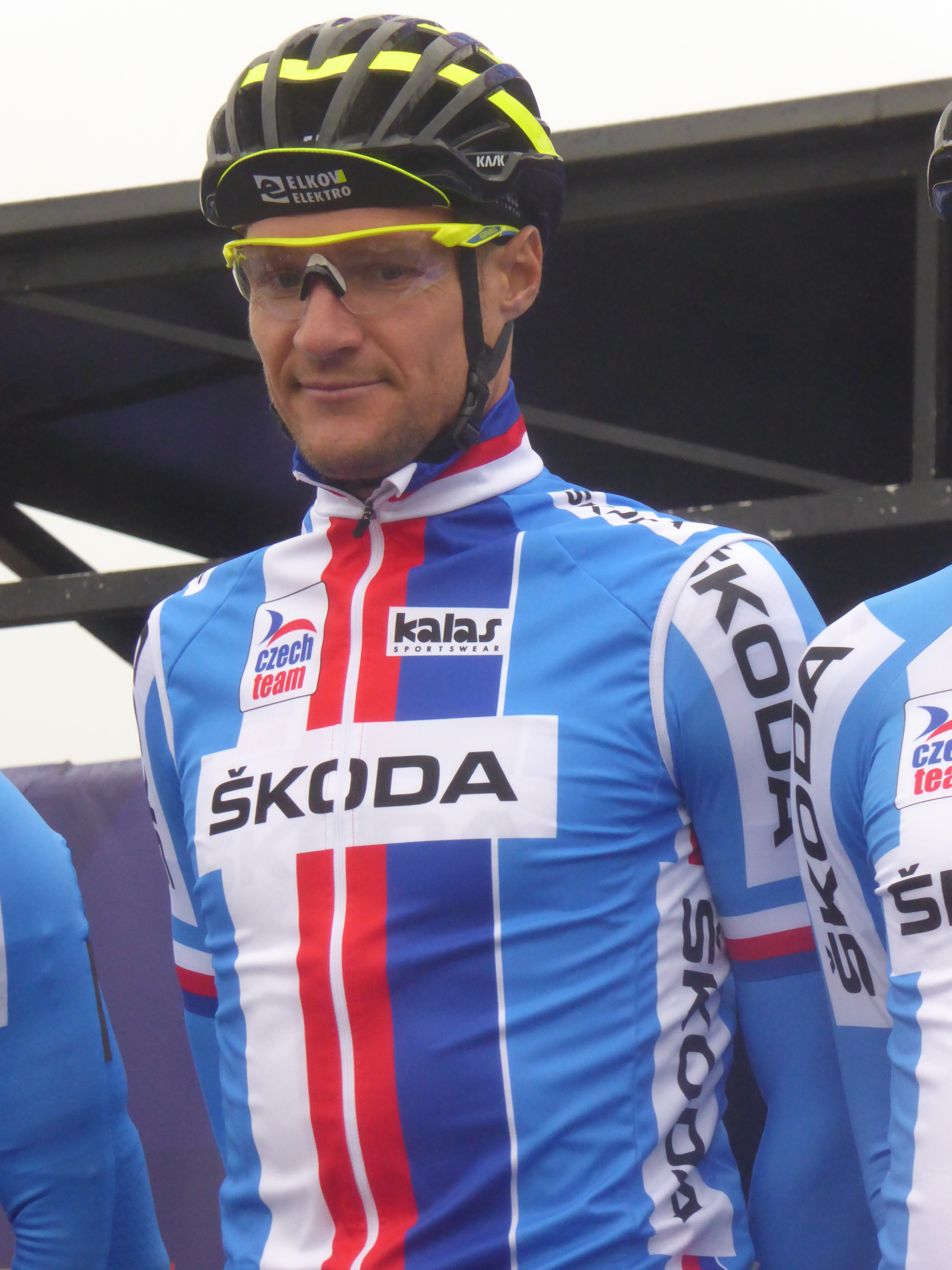
- Kaňkovský at the 2018 European Road Cycling Championships

Personal information
- Full name: Alois Kaňkovský
- Born: 9 July 1983 (age 43): Bělkovice-Lašťany, Czechoslovakia; (now Czech Republic)
- Height: 1.93 m (6 ft 4 in)
- Weight: 83 kg (183 lb)

Cycling career
- Sport: Cycling
- Disciplines: Track; Road
- Role: Rider
- Rider type: Sprinter (road)

Amateur team
- 2008–2010: ASC Dukla Praha

Professional teams
- 2006–2007: ASC Dukla Praha
- 2015–2021: Whirlpool–Author

Major wins
- Omnium World Champion (2007)
Medal record
Representing Czech Republic
Men's track cycling
World Championships
| Gold medal – first place | 2007 Palma de Mallorca | Omnium |
| Bronze medal – third place | 2007 Palma de Mallorca | Madison |
European Championships
| Bronze medal – third place | 2006 Ballerup | Madison |
European Under-23 Championships
| Gold medal – first place | 2001 Brno | Team pursuit |
| Silver medal – second place | 2003 Moscow | 1 km time trial |
| Silver medal – second place | 2004 Valencia | 1 km time trial |
| Silver medal – second place | 2005 Fiorenzuola | 1 km time trial |
| Bronze medal – third place | 2005 Fiorenzuola | Team sprint |
European Junior Championships
| Gold medal – first place | 2001 Fiorenzuola | 1 km time trial |
| Silver medal – second place | 2001 Fiorenzuola | Team sprint |
| Bronze medal – third place | 2001 Fiorenzuola | Points race |

Alois Kaňkovský (born 9 July 1983) is a Czech former professional cyclist, who rode professionally between 2006 and 2021 for the ASC Dukla Praha and Elkov–Kasper teams. At the 2007 UCI Track Cycling World Championships, he became world champion in the omnium event and also won a bronze medal in the madison.

== Major results ==
=== Track ===
2001
UEC European Junior Track Championships

1st Kilo
2nd Team sprint
3rd Points race

2003
2nd Kilo, UEC European Under-23 Track Championships
2004
3rd Kilo, 2004–05 UCI Track Cycling World Cup Classics, Moscow
2005
UEC European Under-23 Track Championships

2nd Kilo
3rd Team sprint

3rd Kilo, 2005–06 UCI Track Cycling World Cup Classics, Moscow
2006
3rd Madison, UEC European Track Championships (with Petr Lazar)
2007
UCI Track Cycling World Championships

1st Omnium
3rd Madison (with Petr Lazar)

3rd Six Days of Turin (with Petr Lazar)
2009
3rd Six Days of Fiorenzuola (with Petr Lazar)
2012
2nd Six Days of Fiorenzuola (with Milan Kadlec)

=== Road ===
2010
1st GP Hydraulika Mikolasek
1st Central European Tour Gyomaendröd GP
1st Stage 4 Czech Cycling Tour
2011
2nd Overall Tour of Taihu Lake

1st Stages 2 & 4

2012
International Azerbaïjan Tour

1st Stages 2 & 3

Tour of Taihu Lake

1st Points classification
1st Stages 2 & 8

Tour of Fuzhou

1st Points classification
1st Stage 1

2013
1st Overall Tour of China II

1st Points classification
1st Stages 2, 3 & 4

1st Tour of Nanjing
Tour of Iran

1st Points classification
1st Stages 2, 3 & 4

1st Stage 3 Tour of China I
2nd Overall Tour of Taihu Lake

1st Stages 5 & 7

2014
2nd Overall Tour of Taihu Lake

1st Stage 2

3rd Tour of Yancheng Coastal Wetlands
2015
1st Memoriał Romana Siemińskiego
Visegrad 4 Bicycle Race

1st GP Hungary
1st GP Slovakia

1st Memoriał Henryka Łasaka
1st Stage 3 Course de la Solidarité Olympique
1st Stage 1 East Bohemia Tour
4th Memoriał Andrzeja Trochanowskiego
2016
1st Puchar Ministra Obrony Narodowej
1st Memoriał Andrzeja Trochanowskiego
1st Stage 2 Szlakiem Grodów Piastowskich
2nd GP Slovakia, Visegrad 4 Bicycle Race
5th Memorial Grundmanna I Wizowskiego
6th Memoriał Romana Siemińskiego
2017
1st Overall Dookoła Mazowsza

1st Stages 1 & 4

1st Puchar Ministra Obrony Narodowej
1st Memoriał Romana Siemińskiego
1st Memoriał Andrzeja Trochanowskiego
1st GP Slovakia, Visegrad 4 Bicycle Race
1st Stage 3 Course de Solidarność et des Champions Olympiques
6th Trofej Umag
2018
1st Memoriał Romana Siemińskiego
1st Memoriał Andrzeja Trochanowskiego
1st GP Czech Republic, Visegrad 4 Bicycle Race
1st Stage 2 Tour du Loir-et-Cher
1st Stage 2 Szlakiem Grodów Piastowskich
1st Stage 2 Grand Prix Cycliste de Gemenc
1st Stage 2 Okolo Jižních Čech
2nd Overall Dookoła Mazowsza

1st Stage 3

6th Croatia–Slovenia
2019
1st Trofej Umag
1st Memoriał Andrzeja Trochanowskiego
1st Memoriał Romana Siemińskiego
Visegrad 4 Bicycle Race

1st GP Polski
1st GP Slovakia

1st Stage 3 Tour of Bihor
1st Stage 3b Tour de Hongrie
8th Overall À travers les Hauts-de-France
2020
2nd GP Slovakia, Visegrad 4 Bicycle Race
7th Trofej Umag
2021
2nd GP Poland, Visegrad 4 Bicycle Race
