= Morgan Kneisky =

French cyclist (born 1987)

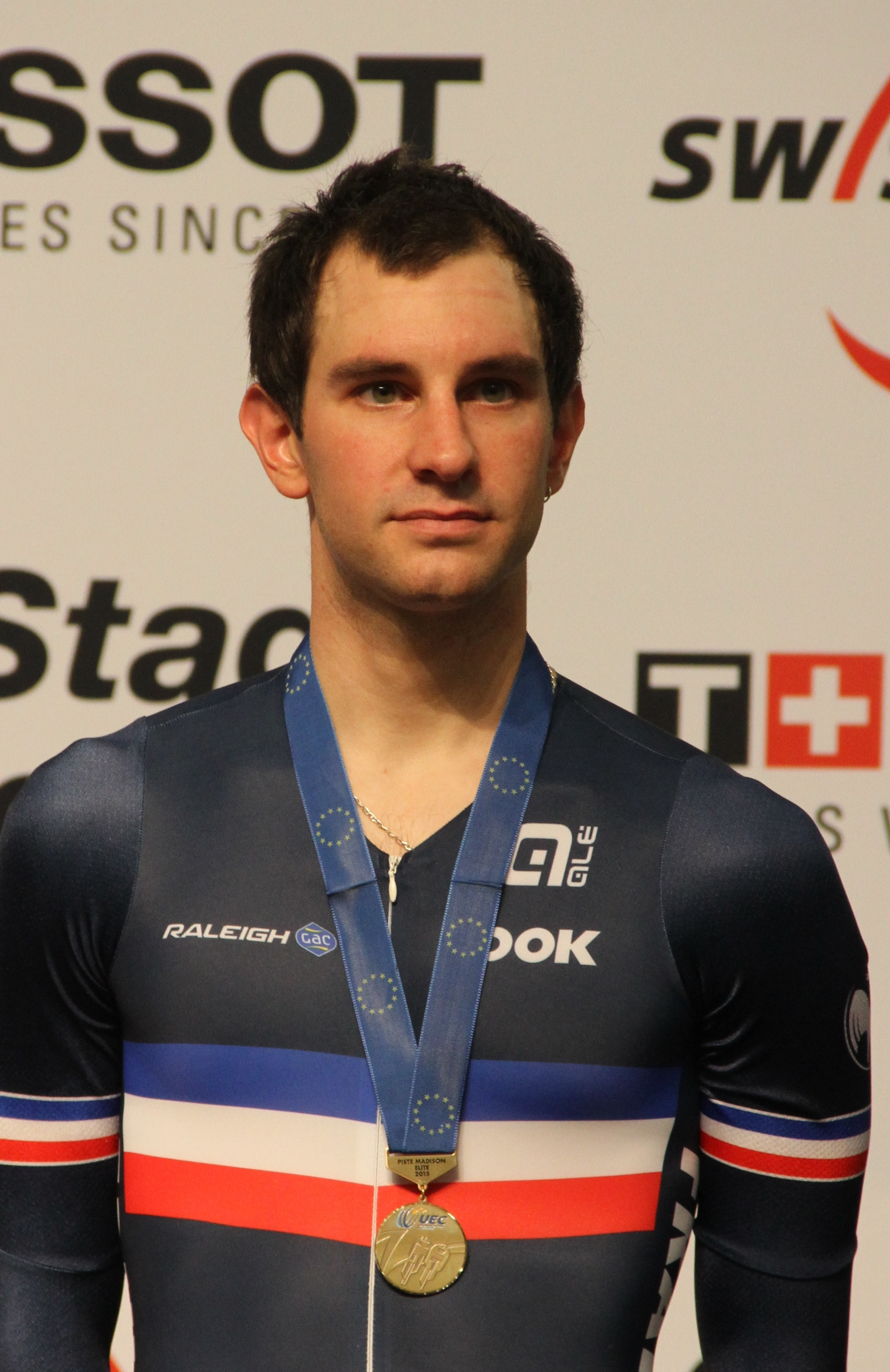
- Kneisky at the 2015 UEC European Track Championships

Personal information
- Full name: Morgan Kneisky
- Born: 31 August 1987 (age 39) Besançon, France

Cycling career
- Sport: Cycling
- Current team: Retired
- Disciplines: Track; Road
- Role: Rider
- Rider type: Endurance (track)

Amateur teams
- 2008–2009: Chambéry Cyclisme Formation
- 2018: AC Bisontine
- 2020–2021: AC Bisontine

Professional teams
- 2010–2013: Roubaix–Lille Métropole
- 2014–2016: Team Raleigh
- 2017: Armée de Terre
- 2018: Roubaix–Lille Métropole
- 2019–2020: Équipe Continentale Groupama–FDJ

Major wins
- Track World Championships Madison (2013, 2015, 2017) Scratch (2009)
Medal record
World Championships
Gold medal – first place	2009 Pruszków	Scratch
Gold medal – first place	2013 Minsk	Madison
Gold medal – first place	2015 Yvelines	Madison
Gold medal – first place	2017 Hong Kong	Madison
Silver medal – second place	2010 Ballerup	Madison
Silver medal – second place	2016 London	Madison
Bronze medal – third place	2011 Apeldoorn	Scratch
Bronze medal – third place	2011 Apeldoorn	Points race
European Championships
Silver medal – second place	2016 Yvelines	Madison
Bronze medal – third place	2011 Apeldoorn	Madison
Bronze medal – third place	2014 Guadeloupe	Madison
Bronze medal – third place	2015 Grenchen	Madison

Morgan Kneisky (born 31 August 1987) is a French former track and road racing cyclist, who rode professionally between 2010 and 2020 for the Team Raleigh–GAC, Armée de Terre, Roubaix–Lille Métropole and Équipe Continentale Groupama–FDJ squads. Kneisky is a four-time UCI Track Cycling World Championships gold medallist, winning golds in the madison in 2013 with Vivien Brisse, 2015 with Bryan Coquard and 2017 with Benjamin Thomas, and the scratch in 2009. He retired following the 2021 UCI Track Cycling World Championships.

== Biography ==
Morgan Kneisky began cycling as a youngster, when he joined the Amicale Cycliste Bisontine. In 2008, he joined the Chambéry Cyclisme Formation, a team in the top national division. That year, he won the Tour de Moselle. In 2009, Kneisky participated in his first Track Cycling World Championships, and came away with the Scratch race title. He has subsequently won three more world titles in the Madison at the 2013, 2015 and 2017 World Championships.

Kneisky signed with the British-based Team Raleigh for the 2014 season. After his contract with the team was not renewed for 2017, in December 2016 it was announced that Kneisky would join the Armée de Terre team for 2017. Following the disbanding of Armée de Terre at the end of 2017, Kneisky rejoined Roubaix–Lille Métropole.

In 2023, he became team manager of UCI Women's Continental Team Lifeplus–Wahoo alongside Małgorzata Jasińska.

== Major results ==
=== Road ===
2008
1st Overall Tour de Moselle

1st Stage 1

2010
7th Grand Prix de la ville de Nogent-sur-Oise
2011
3rd Grand Prix de la ville de Pérenchies
10th Polynormande
2012
1st Stage 3 Boucles de la Mayenne
2nd Grand Prix de la ville de Pérenchies
7th Gooikse Pijl
9th Route Adélie
10th Paris–Troyes
2013
8th Overall Ronde de l'Oise
2014
1st Stafford GP
5th Ryedale Grand Prix
8th Eddie Soens Memorial
9th Wales Open Criterium
10th Circuit of the Fens
2015
1st Points classification Tour Series
2nd Stafford Kermesse
3rd Chorley Grand Prix
3rd Stafford GP
4th Otley Grand Prix
5th Eddie Soens Memorial
6th Velothon Wales
2017
6th Overall Rás Tailteann

=== Track ===
2008
3rd Points race, National Under-23 Championships
2009
1st Scratch, UCI World Championships
National Championships

1st Scratch
1st Madison (with Kévin Fouache)
3rd Team pursuit

2010
1st Scratch, UCI World Cup Classics, Cali
1st Points race, National Championships
2nd Madison, UCI World Championships (with Christophe Riblon)
2011
1st Six Days of Grenoble (with Iljo Keisse)
2nd Madison, UCI World Cup, Cali (with Vivien Brisse)
UCI World Championships

3rd Points race
3rd Scratch

3rd Madison, UEC European Championships (with Vivien Brisse)
3rd Six Days of Ghent (with Marc Hester)
2012
2nd Six Days of Grenoble (with Bryan Coquard)
2013
1st Madison, UCI World Championships (with Vivien Brisse)
1st Madison, National Championships (with Julien Duval)
1st Six Days of Grenoble (with Vivien Brisse)
2014
1st Six Days of Grenoble (with Thomas Boudat)
3rd Madison, UEC European Championships (with Vivien Brisse)
National Championships

3rd Madison (with Philémon Marcel-Millet)
3rd Scratch

2015
1st Madison, UCI World Championships (with Bryan Coquard)
1st Madison, UCI World Cup, Cambridge (with Benjamin Thomas)
2nd Six Days of Bremen (with Jesper Mørkøv)
3rd Madison, UEC European Championships (with Bryan Coquard)
2016
2nd Madison, UCI World Championships (with Benjamin Thomas)
2nd Madison, UEC European Championships (with Benjamin Thomas)
UCI World Cup, Apeldoorn

2nd Points race
3rd Team pursuit

2nd Six Days of Bremen (with Jesper Mørkøv)
2nd Six Days of Fiorenzuola (with Benjamin Thomas)
2nd Six Days of Rotterdam (with Christian Grasmann)
2017
1st Madison, UCI World Championships (with Benjamin Thomas)
1st Six Days of Fiorenzuola (with Benjamin Thomas)
2nd Madison, UCI World Cup, Manchester (with Benjamin Thomas)
2nd Six Days of Ghent (with Benjamin Thomas)
2018
3rd Madison, National Championships (with Joseph Berlin-Sémon)
3rd Six Days of Rotterdam (with Benjamin Thomas)
3rd Six Days of Turin (with Joseph Berlin-Sémon)
2019
National Championships

2nd Scratch
3rd Omnium

3rd Madison, UCI World Cup, Brisbane (with Kévin Vauquelin)
2020
2nd Six Days of Bremen (with Theo Reinhardt)
3rd Six Days of Berlin (with Theo Reinhardt)
