= Mikhail Ignatiev (cyclist) =

Russian cyclist (born 1985)

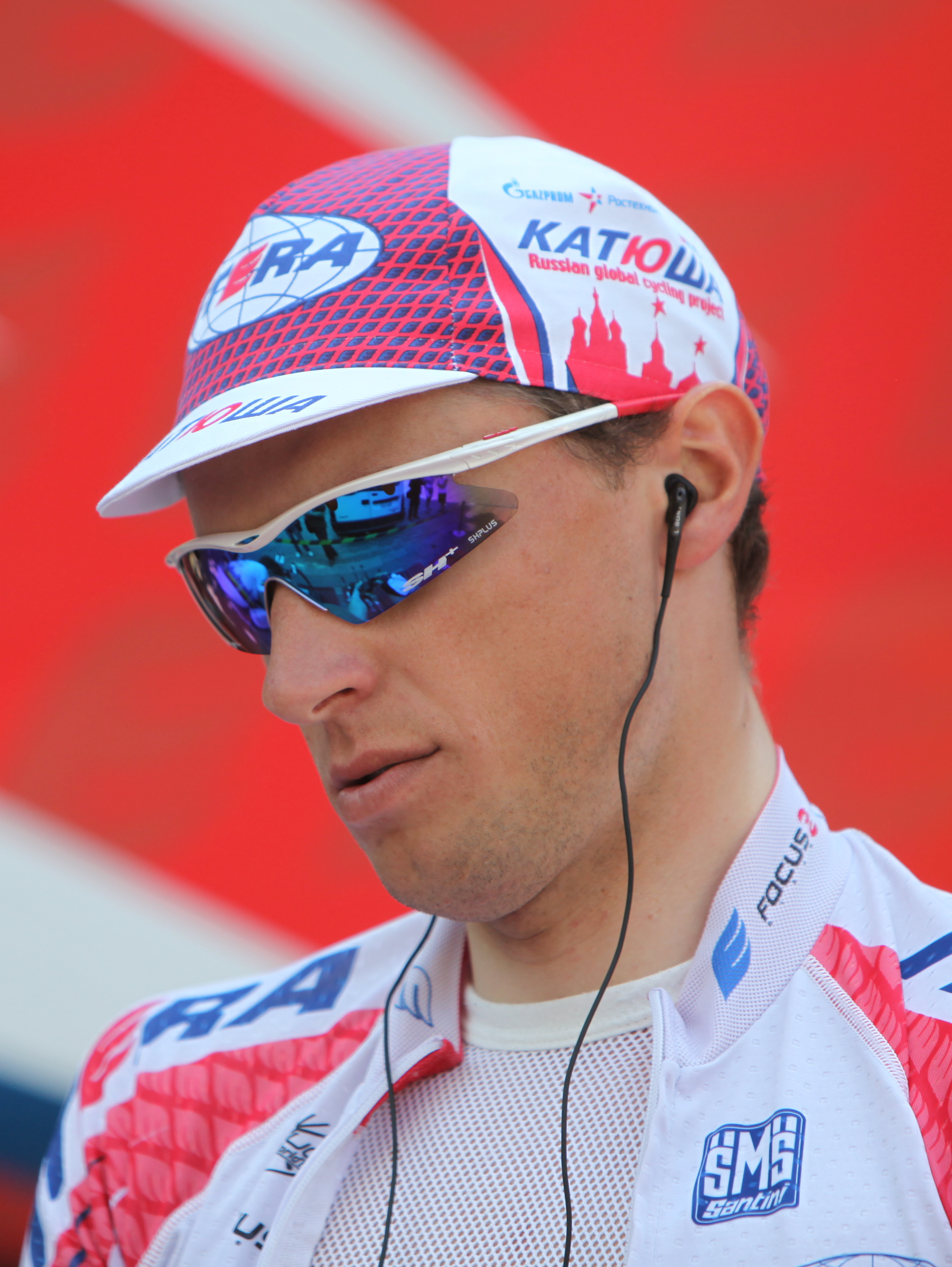
- Ignatiev at the 2011 Tour de Romandie

Personal information
- Full name: Mikhail Borisovich Ignatiev
- Nickname: Gambero
- Born: 7 May 1985 (age 41) Leningrad, Russian SFSR, Soviet Union
- Height: 1.76 m (5 ft 9 in)
- Weight: 67 kg (148 lb)

Cycling career
- Sport: Cycling
- Disciplines: Road; Track
- Role: Rider
- Rider type: Time trialist Classic cycle races

Amateur team
- 2004–2005: Lokomotiv

Professional teams
- 2006–2008: Tinkoff Restaurants
- 2009–2014: Team Katusha
Medal record
Representing Russia
Men's road bicycle racing
World Championships
Gold medal – first place	2005 Madrid	Under-23 Time Trial
Silver medal – second place	2006 Salzburg	Under-23 Time Trial
Silver medal – second place	2007 Stuttgart	Under-23 Time Trial
Men's track cycling
Olympic Games
Gold medal – first place	2004 Athens	Points race
Bronze medal – third place	2008 Beijing	Madison
World Championships
Bronze medal – third place	2007 Mallorca	Points race

Mikhail Borisovich Ignatiev (Михаил Борисович Игнатьев) (born 7 May 1985) is a former Russian professional track and road bicycle racer. He recently rode for UCI ProTour team Team Katusha, as well as participating in various track events. He is known as a time trial specialist, and also has a reputation for making the breakaway in road races and trying, often with success, to solo to victory.

== Career ==
In 2004 Ignatiev achieved his biggest success to date, winning a gold medal in the points race at the Athens Olympics. On the road, Ignatiev came to prominence with his ability in the individual time trial. In 2002 and 2003, he was the World Junior Champion, while in 2005 he became the World Under 23 Champion.

Ignatiev signed his first professional contract in 2006, when he started riding for the Tinkoff Restaurants cycling team. This team competed mainly in Russia, but Ignatiev made a big impact during a series of Spanish races in the middle part of the season.

When Tinkoff Credit Systems was established from Tinkoff Restaurants in 2007, Ignatiev moved to Marina di Massa, Italy. Early in the 2007 cycling season, Ignatiev made a name for himself by winning a stage of the Tour Méditerranéen and the Trofeo Laigueglia with successful late attacks. He continued his form throughout the season and won two time trials, the Prologue in Ster Elektrotoer, Stage 4 of the Regio-Tour and the first stage of Vuelta a Burgos.

In the 2009 cycling season he moved to UCI World Tour Team Katusha, a newly formed Russian cycling team, sponsored by Itera, Gazprom and Rostechnologies. In his first season, he achieved some greatest results having taken two podiums at 2009 Tour de France.

== Career achievements ==
=== Major results ===
2002
1st Time trial, UCI Junior Road World Championships
UCI Junior Track World Championships

1st Points race
1st Team pursuit

1st Points race, UEC European Junior Track Championships
2003
1st Time trial, UCI Junior Road World Championships
UCI Junior Track World Championships

1st Madison
1st Team pursuit

1st Team pursuit, UEC European Junior Track Championships
2004
1st Points race, Olympic Games
2005
1st Time trial, UCI Road World Under–23 Championships
2006
1st Individual pursuit, UEC European Under–23 Track Championships
1st Overall Volta a Lleida

1st Stages 1 & 2

1st Clásica Memorial Txuma
2nd Time trial, UCI Road World Under–23 Championships
2007
1st Trofeo Laigueglia
1st Stage 3 Tour Méditerranéen
1st Prologue Ster Elektrotoer
1st Stage 4 Regio-Tour
1st Stage 1 Vuelta a Burgos
2nd Grand Prix d'Ouverture La Marseillaise
5th Tour du Haut Var
2nd Time trial, UCI Road World Under–23 Championships
3rd Points race, UCI Track World Championships
1st Fuga Gilera classification Giro d'Italia
2010
1st Stage 6 Tirreno–Adriatico
2011
1st Time trial, National Road Championships
Combativity award Stage 16 Tour de France
2012
3rd Overall Driedaagse van West-Vlaanderen
2013
1st Turkish Beauties classification, Presidential Tour of Turkey
3rd Overall Tour du Poitou-Charentes

=== Grand Tour general classification results timeline ===
Grand Tour	2007	2008	2009	2010	2011	2012	2013
Giro d'Italia	128	140	167	131	—	143	—
Tour de France	—	—	140	—	147	—	—
Vuelta a España	—	104	—	148	—	171	—

Legend
—	Did not compete
DNF	Did not finish
