= Jiří Hochmann =

Czech cyclist

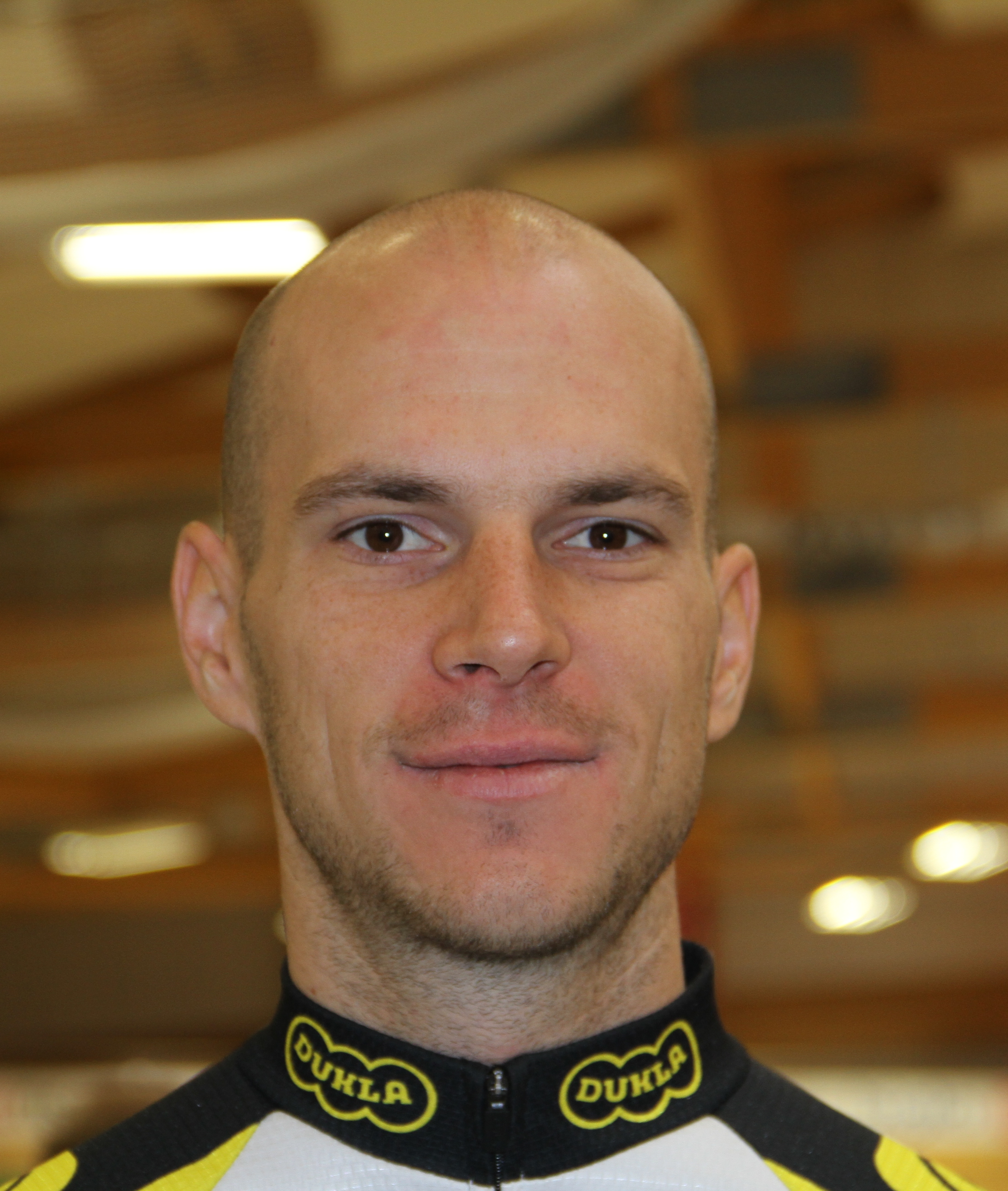
- Hochmann at the 2015 UEC European Track Championships

Personal information
- Born: 10 January 1986 (age 40) Brno, Czechoslovakia

Cycling career
- Sport: Cycling
- Current team: Retired
- Disciplines: Road; Track
- Role: Rider

Amateur team
- 2016: NejlevnejsiPNEU z.s.

Professional teams
- 2006–2007: ASC Dukla Praha
- 2011–2015: ASC Dukla Praha
- 2018: Team Dukla Praha
Medal record
Men's track cycling
Representing Czech Republic
World Championships
Silver medal – second place	2011 Apeldoorn	Madison
Bronze medal – third place	2009 Pruszków	Madison
European Championships
Gold medal – first place	2010 Pruszków	Madison
Gold medal – first place	2012 Panevėžys	Madison
Bronze medal – third place	2016 Yvelines	Elimination race

Jiří Hochmann (born 10 January 1986) is a Czech former professional racing cyclist. He rode at the 2015 UCI Track Cycling World Championships.

== Major results ==
=== Track ===
2003
UEC European Junior Championships

3rd Points race
3rd Team sprint

2008
UEC European Under-23 Championships

3rd Points race
3rd Scratch

2009
3rd Madison (with Martin Bláha), UCI World Championships
2010
1st Madison (with Martin Bláha), UEC European Championships
2011
2nd Madison (with Martin Bláha), UCI World Championships
3rd Six Days of Fiorenzuola (with Martin Bláha)
2012
1st Madison (with Martin Bláha), UEC European Championships
3rd Six Days of Fiorenzuola (with Vojtěch Hačecký)
2016
3rd Elimination race, UEC European Championships

=== Road ===
2010
5th GP Hydraulika Mikolasek
2011
1st Stage 1 Szlakiem Grodów Piastowskich
2012
1st Overall Okolo Jižních Čech

1st Stage 1

4th Road race, National Road Championships
2013
1st Stage 1 Tour of China I
Tour of Fuzhou

1st Points classification
1st Stage 3

3rd Tour of Nanjing
7th Overall Tour of Taihu Lake
2014
2nd GP Polski Via Odra, Visegrad 4 Bicycle Race
2015
3rd GP Slovakia, Visegrad 4 Bicycle Race
