= Kilian Moser =

Swiss cyclist

Personal information
- Born: 29 July 1988 (age 38) Interlaken, Switzerland

Cycling career
- Sport: Cycling
- Discipline: Racing
- Role: Rider

Kilian Moser (born 29 July 1988 in Interlaken) is a Swiss professional racing cyclist.

== Career wins ==
- 2008 - UIV Cup Rotterdam, U23 (NED)
