= Théry Schir =

Swiss cyclist (born 1993)

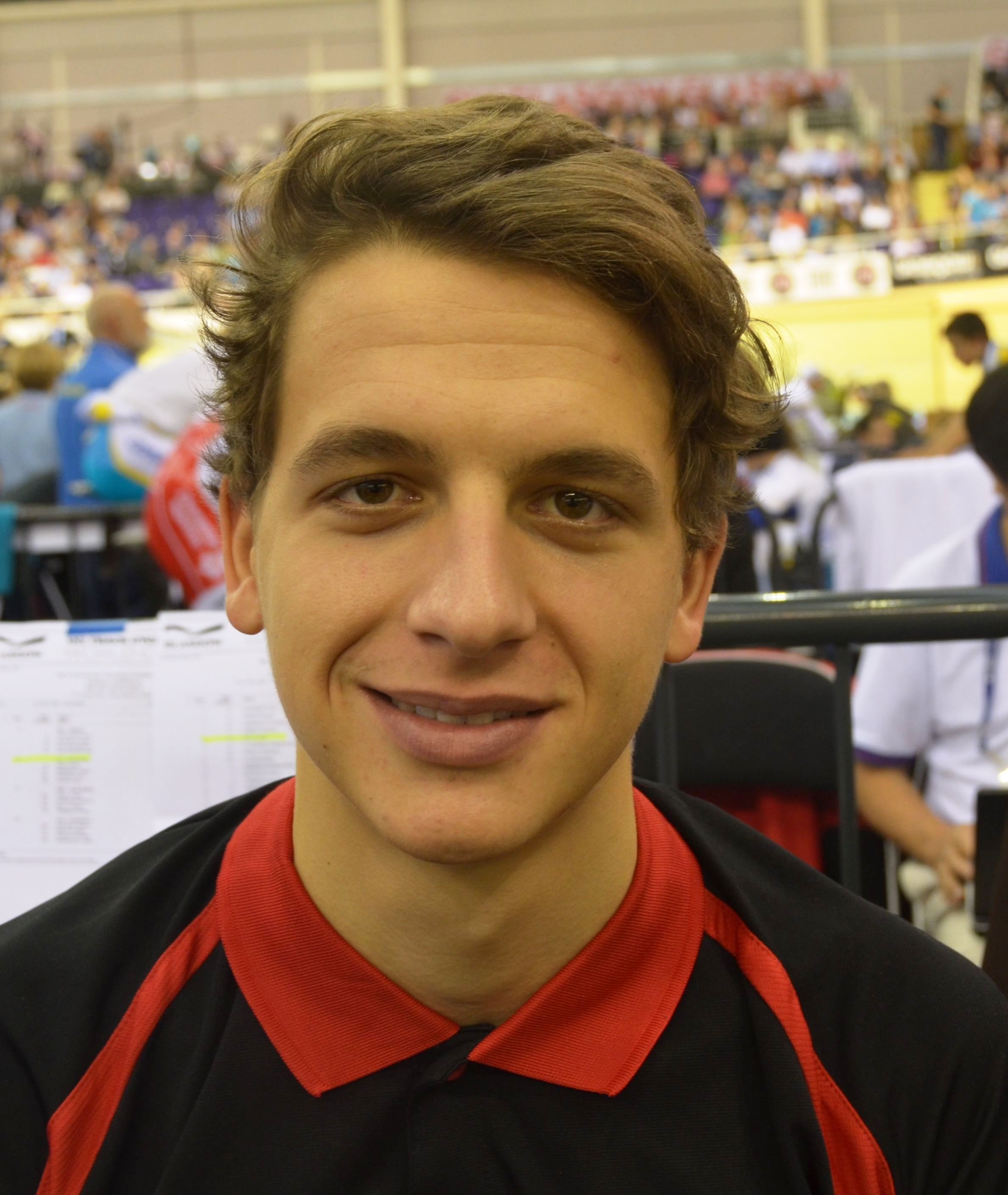
- Schir in 2012

Personal information
- Full name: Théry Schir
- Born: 18 February 1993 (age 33) Lausanne, Switzerland

Cycling career
- Sport: Cycling
- Disciplines: Track; Road
- Role: Rider
- Rider type: Time trialist

Amateur teams
- 2013–2014: EKZ Racing Team
- 2015: BMC Development Team
- 2016: EKZ Racing Team
- 2018–2019: VC Orbe
- 2019: Team Hörmann

Professional teams
- 2017: Team Vorarlberg
- 2020–2021: Swiss Racing Academy
Medal record
Representing Switzerland
Men's track cycling
World Championships
Bronze medal – third place	2014 Cali	Madison
European Games
Silver medal – second place	2019 Minsk	Omnium
Bronze medal – third place	2019 Minsk	Team pursuit
European Championships
Silver medal – second place	2015 Grenchen	Team pursuit
Silver medal – second place	2018 Glasgow	Team pursuit

Théry Schir (born 18 February 1993) is a Swiss professional racing cyclist, who most recently rode for UCI Continental team Swiss Racing Academy. He rode at the 2015 UCI Track Cycling World Championships.

== Major results ==
=== Track ===
2011
UEC European Junior Track Championships

1st Madison (with Stefan Küng)
2nd Points race

2012
UEC European Under-23 Track Championships

2nd Scratch
2nd Team pursuit

2013
UEC European Under-23 Track Championships

1st Team pursuit
2nd Madison (with Stefan Küng)
2nd Points race

2014
1st Team pursuit, UEC European Under-23 Track Championships
2013–14 UCI Track Cycling World Cup, Guadalajara

2nd Team pursuit
3rd Madison (with Stefan Küng)

3rd Madison, UCI Track Cycling World Championships (with Stefan Küng)
3rd Team pursuit, 2014–15 UCI Track Cycling World Cup, Guadalajara
2015
UEC European Under-23 Track Championships

1st Madison (with Frank Pasche)
1st Omnium
2nd Team pursuit

2015–16 UCI Track Cycling World Cup

2nd Team pursuit, Cali
2nd Madison, Cambridge (with Silvan Dillier)
3rd Madison, Cali (with Stefan Küng)

2nd Team pursuit, UEC European Track Championships
2018
2nd Team pursuit, UEC European Track Championships
2019
2nd Scratch, 2018–19 UCI Track Cycling World Cup, Cambridge
European Games

2nd Omnium
3rd Team pursuit

2019–20 UCI Track Cycling World Cup, Hong Kong

3rd Omnium
3rd Team pursuit

=== Road ===
2011
2nd Time trial, National Junior Road Championships
2013
2nd Time trial, National Under-23 Road Championships
2014
1st Time trial, National Under-23 Road Championships
2015
1st Time trial, National Under-23 Road Championships
8th Time trial, UCI Under-23 Road World Championships
8th Paris–Roubaix Espoirs
2016
3rd Time trial, National Road Championships
2017
3rd Time trial, National Road Championships
2018
3rd Overall Tour of Mevlana
6th Overall Tour of Black Sea
2021
3rd Time trial, National Road Championships
