= David Muntaner =

Spanish cyclist

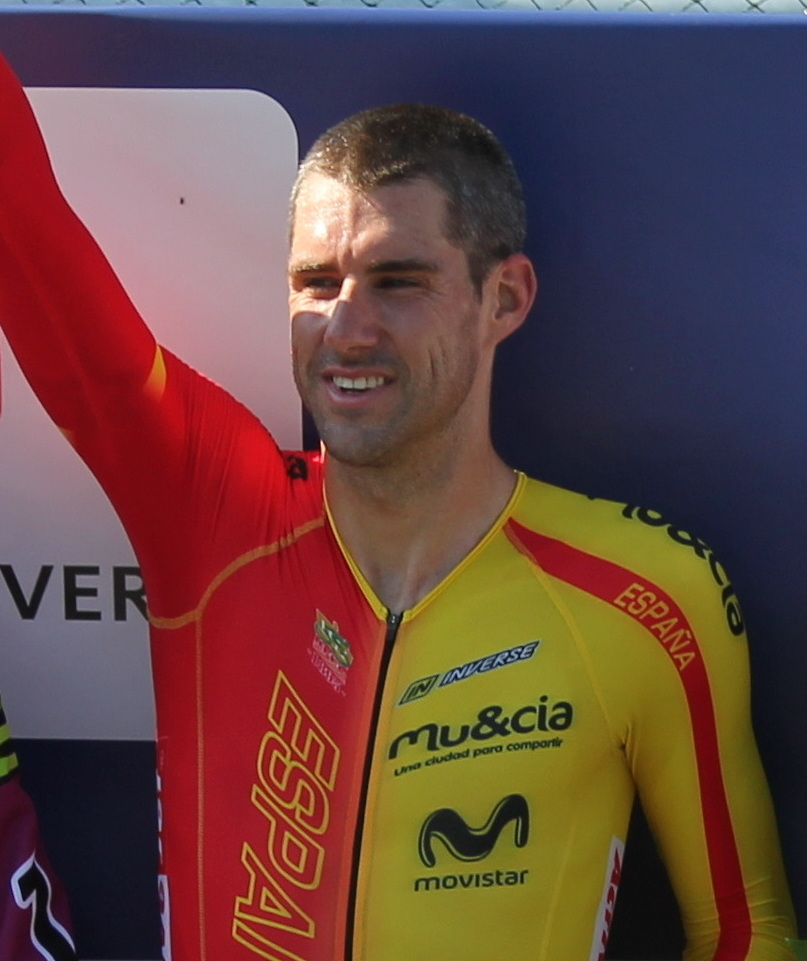
- Muntaner in 2015

Personal information
- Full name: David Muntaner Juaneda
- Born: 12 July 1983 (age 43) Palma, Majorca, Spain

Cycling career
- Sport: Cycling
- Disciplines: Track and road
- Role: Rider
- Rider type: Track: endurance

Amateur teams
- 2005: Gráficas Ona
- 2012: Stryc

Professional team
- 2014-: ActiveJet Team

Major wins
- Track World Championships Madison (2014)
Medal record
Men's track cycling
Representing Spain
World Championships
| Gold medal – first place | 2014 Cali | Madison |
| Silver medal – second place | 2013 Minsk | Madison |
European Championships
| Silver medal – second place | 2013 Apeldoorn | Madison |

David Muntaner Juaneda (born 12 July 1983) is a Spanish track cyclist. At the 2008 and 2012 Summer Olympics, he competed in the Men's team pursuit for the national team.

Muntaner turned professional for the 2014 road season with the ActiveJet team.
