= Vivien Brisse =

French cyclist (born 1988)

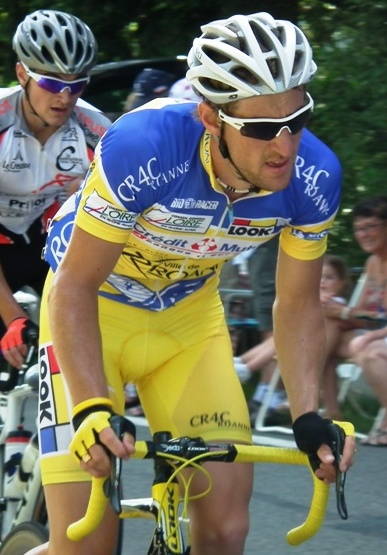
- Brisse in 2011

Personal information
- Born: 8 April 1988 (age 38) France

Cycling career
- Sport: Cycling
- Disciplines: Road cycling Track cycling
Medal record
Representing France
Track Cycling World Championships
Gold medal – first place	2013 Minsk	Madison
European Track Championships
Bronze medal – third place	2011 Apeldoorn	Madison

Vivien Brisse (born 8 April 1988) is a track cyclist from France who also competed on the road. In 2011 he won the bronze medal in the madison at the 2011 UEC European Track Championships, together with Morgan Kneisky, in Apeldoorn, the Netherlands. Two years later they became world champion in the Men's madison at the 2013 UCI Track Cycling World Championships. Brisse competed at all UCI Track Cycling World Championships between 2010 and 2014.
