= Daniel Kreutzfeldt =

Danish cyclist

Personal information
- Full name: Daniel Kreutzfeldt
- Born: 19 November 1987 (age 38) Roskilde, Denmark

Cycling career
- Sport: Cycling
- Disciplines: Road and track
- Role: Rider

Professional teams
- 2007–2008: Odense Energi
- 2008: Energy Fyn
- 2009: Capinordic
Medal record
Representing Denmark
Men's track cycling
World Championships
Silver medal – second place	2009 Pruszków	Scratch

Daniel Kreutzfeldt (born 19 November 1987, in Roskilde) is a Danish track cyclist. His brother, Christian, is also a racing cyclist.

== Palmarès ==
2005
National Track Championships

3rd, Pursuit
2nd, Team Pursuit

2006
National Track Championships

1st, Team Pursuit (with Alex Rasmussen, Casper Jørgensen and Martin Lollesgaard)

2006–2007 UIV Cup

3rd, Amsterdam

2007
2006–2007 UIV Cup

1st, Bremen (with Robert Kriegs)
2nd, Copenhagen
3rd, Rotterdam

National Track Championships

1, Team Pursuit (with Alex Rasmussen, Casper Jørgensen and Martin Lollesgaard)
3, Scratch
3, 1 km time trial

2007–2008 UIV Cup
3rd, Amsterdam

2008
3rd, Jysk/Fynsk Mesterskab

Ringerike GP

1st, Stage 5
1st, Young rider classification

National Track Championships

3rd, Team Pursuit
2nd, 1 km time trial

3rd, Chrono des Herbiers

2008–2009 Track Cycling World Cup

2nd, Team Pursuit, Manchester

2nd, Six Days of Copenhagen

2009
2008–2009 Track Cycling World Cup

3rd, Team Pursuit, Copenhagen

Track Cycling World Championships, Pruszków, Poland

2nd, Points race

3rd, Stage 3, Circuit des Ardennes
