= Andreas Graf =

Austrian cyclist

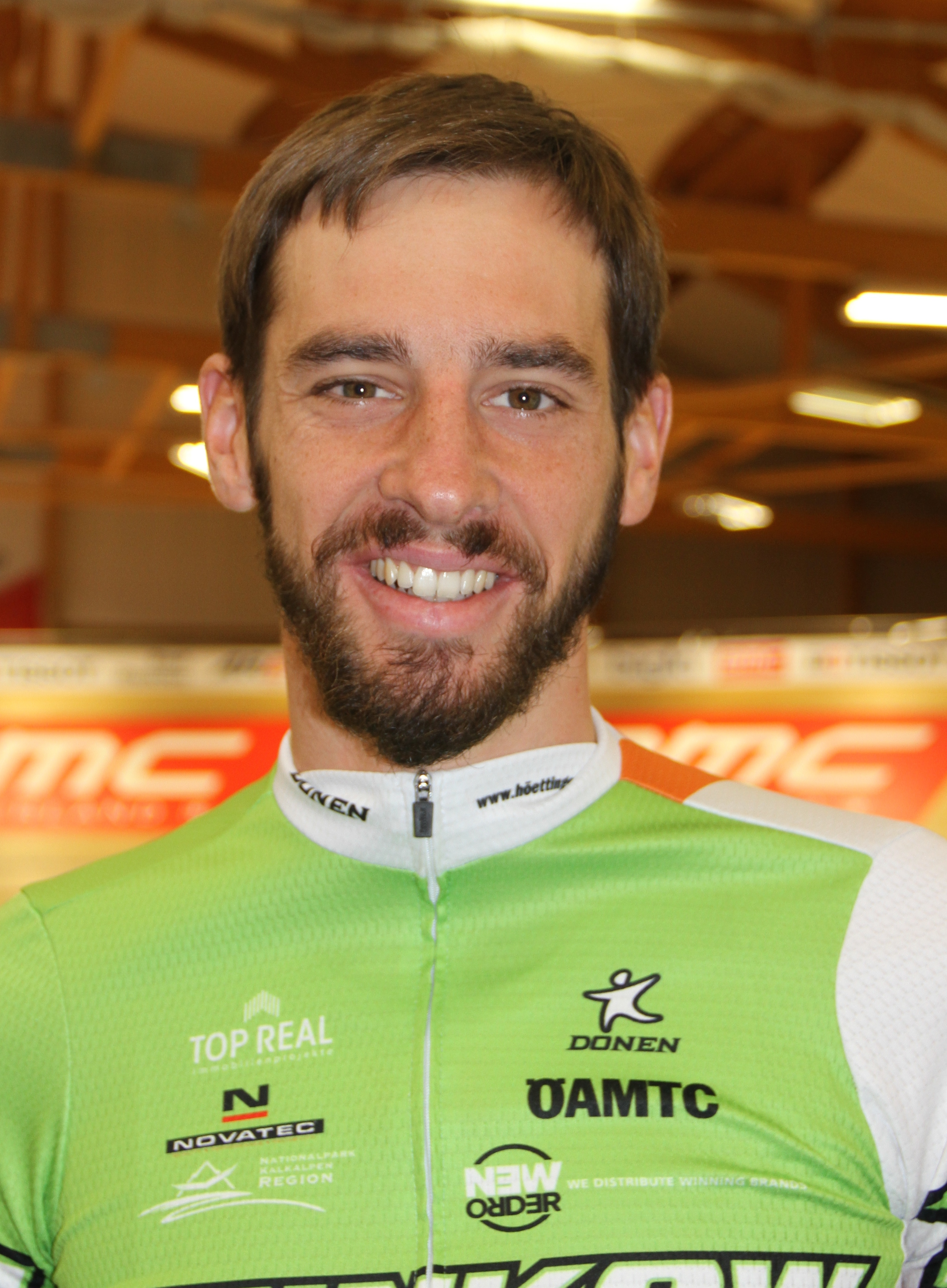
- Graf in 2015

Personal information
- Full name: Andreas Graf
- Born: 7 August 1985 (age 41) Ebreichsdorf, Austria

Cycling career
- Sport: Cycling
- Disciplines: Road; Track
- Role: Rider

Amateur teams
- 2004–2008: NE Radunion
- 2013–2014: RSV Irschenberg

Professional teams
- 2009–2012: RC Arbö–Wels–Gourmetfein
- 2015–2019: Hrinkow Advarics Cycleangteam
- 2020: SPORT.LAND. Niederösterreich
Medal record
Representing Austria
Men's track cycling
World Championships
Silver medal – second place	2016 London	Points race
European Games
Bronze medal – third place	2019 Minsk	Madison
European Championships
Gold medal – first place	2014 Baie-Mahault	Madison

Andreas Graf (born 7 August 1985) is an Austrian professional racing cyclist, who most recently rode for UCI Continental team SPORT.LAND. Niederösterreich.

== Major results ==
=== Road ===
2004
2nd Time trial, National Under-23 Road Championships
2005
2nd Time trial, National Under-23 Road Championships
2008
2nd Time trial, National Road Championships
2009
2nd Time trial, National Road Championships
2011
1st Stage 1 (TTT) Cycling Tour of Sibiu
2nd Time trial, National Road Championships
2012
2nd Time trial, National Road Championships
2013
2nd Time trial, National Road Championships
2014
1st Harlem Skyscraper Classic
2015
3rd Time trial, National Road Championships

=== Track ===
2008
1st Madison, National Track Championships (with Andreas Müller)
2009
National Track Championships

1st Individual pursuit
1st Madison (with Andreas Müller)

2010
National Track Championships

1st Individual pursuit
1st Madison (with Andreas Müller)

1st Three Days of Aigle (with Andreas Müller)
2012
1st Points race, 2012–13 UCI Track Cycling World Cup, Cali
2013
1st Individual pursuit, National Track Championships
2014
1st Madison, UEC European Track Championships (with Andreas Müller)
2015
National Track Championships

1st Madison (with Andreas Müller)
1st Points race

2016
1st Madison, National Track Championships (with Andreas Müller)
2nd Points race, UCI Track Cycling World Championships
2017
National Track Championships

1st Madison (with Andreas Müller)
1st Omnium

2019
3rd Madison, European Games (with Andreas Müller)
2020
National Track Championships

1st Points race
2nd Madison (with Stefan Mastaller)
