= Milan Kadlec (cyclist, born 1974) =

Czech cyclist (born 1974)

Personal information
- Full name: Milan Kadlec
- Born: 13 October 1974 (age 52): Uherské Hradiště, Czechoslovakia; (now Czech Republic)

Cycling career
- Sport: Cycling
- Current team: Retired
- Disciplines: Road; Track
- Role: Rider

Amateur teams
- 1996: Tico
- 2008: ASC Dukla Praha
- 2009: Výber Cech
- 2010: ASC Dukla Praha

Professional teams
- 2000–2001: Mobilvetta Design–Rossin
- 2002–2003: Lampre–Daikin
- 2004: Vini Caldirola–Nobili Rubinetterie
- 2005: Ed' System ZVVZ
- 2006–2007: ASC Dukla Praha
- 2011–2014: ASC Dukla Praha

Major wins
- Giro d'Oro (1999); National Road Race Championships (2012)
Medal record
Representing the Czech Republic
Men's track cycling
World Championships
Bronze medal – third place	2010 Ballerup	Points race
European Elite Championships
Bronze medal – third place	2011 Apeldoorn	Points Race

Milan Kadlec (born 13 October 1974 in Uherské Hradiště, Czechoslovakia) is a Czech former racing cyclist, who competed both on the road and the track. In 2010, he won the bronze medal in the UCI Track Cycling World Championships points race.

== Major results ==
1998
1st Stage 1 Ytong Bohemia Tour
2nd Road race, National Road Championships
1999
1st Overall Giro della Valle d'Aosta
1st Giro d'Oro
1st GP Capodarco
1st Stage 4 Ytong Bohemia Tour
National Road Championships

2nd Road race
2nd Time trial

2000
1st Stage 1 Ytong Bohemia Tour
3rd Time trial, National Road Championships
2001
1st Criterium d'Abruzzo
1st Prologue Ytong Bohemia Tour
2nd Overall Brixia Tour
3rd Points race, UCI Track Cycling World Cup Classics, Szczecin
2002
1st Overall Ytong Bohemia Tour
2004
3rd Overall Ytong Bohemia Tour
7th Trofeo Matteotti
2005
3rd Time trial, National Road Championships
2006
2nd Time trial, National Road Championships
2007
1st Points race, National Track Championships
3rd Scratch, 2007–08 UCI Track Cycling World Cup Classics, Sydney
4th Prague–Karlovy Vary–Prague
2008
1st Individual pursuit, National Track Championships
8th Prague–Karlovy Vary–Prague
2009
3rd Points race, 2008–09 UCI Track Cycling World Cup Classics, Ballerup
2010
3rd Points race, UCI Track Cycling World Championships
3rd Road race, National Road Championships
2011
7th Overall Szlakiem Grodów Piastowskich
10th Overall Tour of South Africa
10th Overall Tour of Taihu Lake
2012
1st Road race, National Road Championships
1st Overall Tour of Taihu Lake

1st Stage 1

7th Overall Tour of Azerbaijan (Iran)
9th Grand Prix Královéhradeckého kraje
10th Overall Tour of Fuzhou

1st Stage 3

2013
2nd Overall Tour of Iran

1st Stage 6

2nd Overall Tour of Fuzhou

1st Mountains classification

2014
2nd Overall Tour of China II
4th Overall Tour of Fuzhou
6th Overall Tour of Iran

1st Stage 3
