= Andreas Müller (cyclist) =

Austrian cyclist

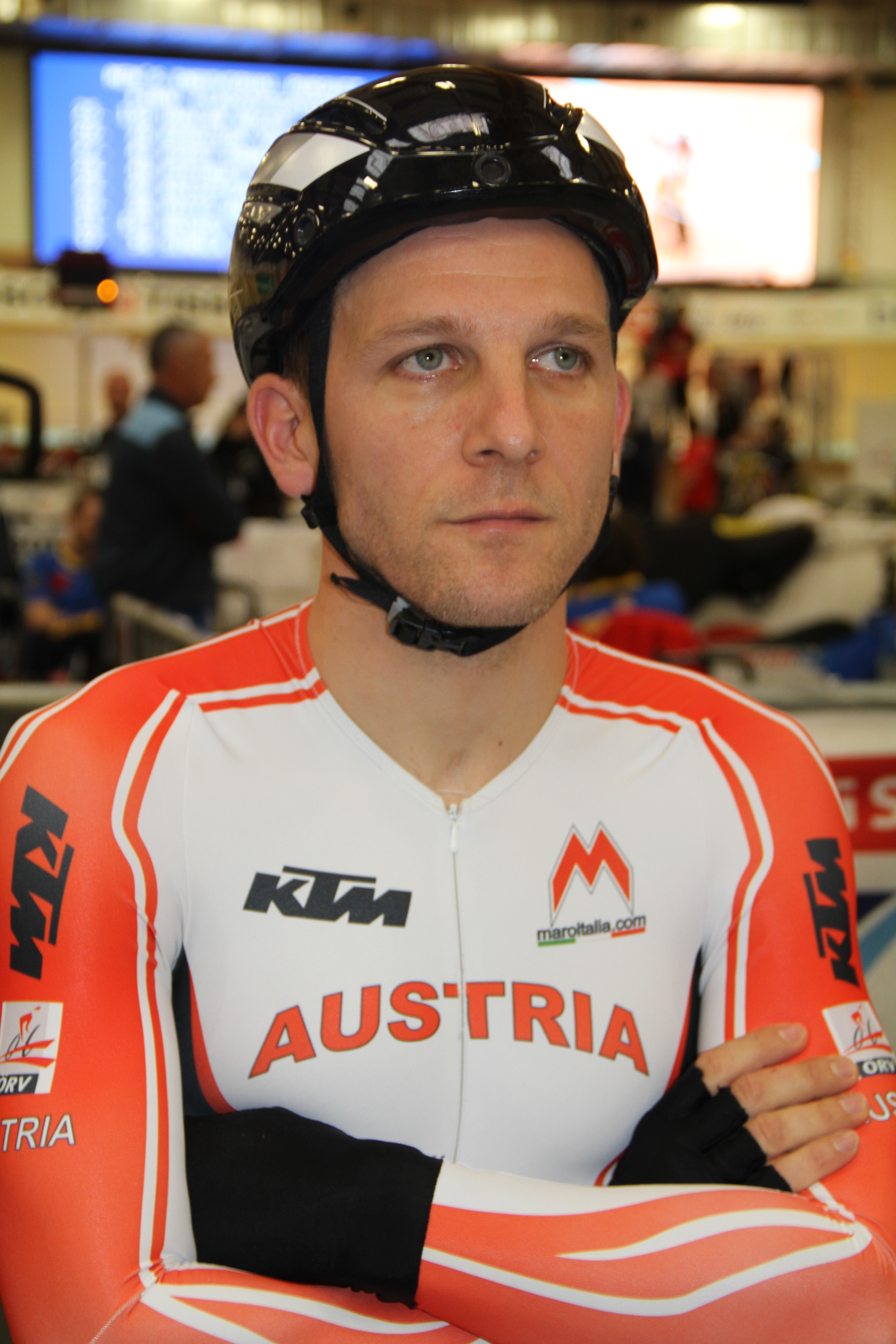
- Müller in 2015

Personal information
- Full name: Andreas Müller
- Born: 25 November 1979 (age 46) Berlin, Germany

Cycling career
- Sport: Cycling
- Disciplines: Track; Road
- Role: Rider

Amateur team
- 2004–2012: Berliner TSC

Professional teams
- 2013–2014: Arbö–Gebrüder Weiss–Oberndorfer
- 2015–2016: Hrinkow Advarics Cycleangteam
Medal record
Representing Austria
Men's track cycling
World Championships
Silver medal – second place	2013 Minsk	Scratch
Bronze medal – third place	2009 Pruszków	Scratch
European Games
Bronze medal – third place	2019 Minsk	Madison
European Championships
Gold medal – first place	2014 Baie-Mahault	Madison

Andreas Müller (born 25 November 1979) is a German-born Austrian professional racing cyclist. He rode at the 2015 UCI Track Cycling World Championships, and in the 2020 Summer Olympics.

== Major results ==
2000
1st Team pursuit, German National Track Championships
2nd Team pursuit, UCI Track Cycling World Cup Classics, Moscow
2001
Team pursuit, UCI Track Cycling World Cup Classics

1st Szczecin
1st Ipoh

1st Points race, German National Track Championships
2002
1st Points race, German National Track Championships
3rd Madison, UCI Track Cycling World Cup Classics, Kunming (with Guido Fulst)
2003
UCI Track Cycling World Cup Classics

1st Madison, Moscow (with Guido Fulst)
1st Madison, Sydney (with Guido Fulst)
2nd Points race, Cape Town
2nd Team pursuit, Sydney
3rd Scratch, Sydney

1st Madison, German National Track Championships
2005
1st Points race, German National Track Championships
2nd Scratch, 2005–06 UCI Track Cycling World Cup Classics, Moscow
3rd Madison, 2004–05 UCI Track Cycling World Cup Classics, Manchester (with Leif Lampater)
2008
Austrian National Track Championships

1st Madison (with Andreas Graf)
1st Points race
1st Scratch

2nd Scratch, 2007–08 UCI Track Cycling World Cup Classics, Copenhagen
2009
3rd Scratch, UCI Track Cycling World Championships
2013
1st Scratch, 2013–14 UCI Track Cycling World Cup, Manchester
1st Points race, Austrian National Track Championships
2nd Scratch, UCI Track Cycling World Championships
3rd Six Days of Berlin (with Franco Marvulli)
2014
1st Madison, UEC European Track Championships (with Andreas Graf)
Austrian National Track Championships

1st Kilo
1st Points race

1st Six Days of Berlin (with Kenny De Ketele)
3rd Six Days of Bremen (with Marc Hester)
2015
1st Madison, Austrian National Track Championships (with Andreas Graf)
1st Stage 7 Rás Tailteann
2016
3rd Six Days of Copenhagen (with Andreas Graf)
2017
3rd Madison, 2017–18 UCI Track Cycling World Cup, Santiago (with Andreas Graf)
2019
2nd Hong Kong, 2018–19 Six Day Series (with Andreas Graf)
3rd Madison, European Games (with Andreas Graf)
3rd Six Days of Berlin (with Andreas Graf)
