= 2011 European Track Championships – Men's madison =

UEC European Champion jersey

The men's madison at the 2011 European Track Championships was held on 23 October 2011 with 20 teams participating. Two heats were held to determine the final participants.

== Medalists ==
Gold	Belgium; Kenny De Ketele; Iljo Keisse
Silver	Switzerland; Claudio Imhof; Cyrille Thièry
Bronze	France; Vivien Brisse; Morgan Kneisky

== Results ==
=== Qualifying ===
The top 8 teams of each heat advanced to the final. The races were held at 10:00.

==== Heat 1 ====
Rank	Nation	Cyclists	Points	Laps
1	Czech Republic	Vojtech Hacecky; Marek Mixa	5	0
2	Belgium	Kenny De Ketele; Iljo Keisse	10	–1
3	Switzerland	Claudio Imhof; Cyrille Thièry	8	–1
4	Netherlands	Nick Stöpler; Wim Stroetinga	7	–1
5	Germany	Marcel Kalz; Lucas Liss	5	–1
6	Austria	Andreas Graf; Andreas Müller	5	–1
7	Denmark	Michael Mørkøv; Christian Ranneries	5	–1
8	France	Julien Duval; Laurent Pichon	4	–1
9	Russia	Kirill Baranov; Kirill Yatsevich	4	–1
10	Poland	Mateusz Nowak; Adam Stachowiak	2	–1

==== Heat 2 ====
Rank	Nation	Cyclists	Points	Laps
1	Netherlands	Jens Mouris; Peter Schep	5	0
2	Ukraine	Sergiy Lagkuti; Mykhaylo Radionov	0	0
3	Denmark	Casper Folsach; Mathias Møller Nielsen	0	0
4	Spain	David Juaneda; Albert Torres	11	–1
5	Czech Republic	Martin Bláha; Milan Kadlec	10	–1
6	Switzerland	Silvan Dillier; Loïc Perizzolo	9	–1
7	France	Vivien Brisse; Morgan Kneisky	8	–1
8	Italy	Omar Bertazzo; Angelo Ciccone	5	–1
9	Russia	Valery Kaykov; Ivan Savitskiy	4	–1
10	Belgium	Ingmar De Poortere; Steve Schets	3	–1

=== Final ===
The race was held at 16:21.

Rank	Nation	Cyclists	Points	Laps
1st place, gold medalist(s)	Belgium	Kenny De Ketele; Iljo Keisse	19	0
2nd place, silver medalist(s)	Switzerland	Claudio Imhof; Cyrille Thièry	12	0
3rd place, bronze medalist(s)	France	Vivien Brisse; Morgan Kneisky	1	0
4	Austria	Andreas Graf; Andreas Müller	8	0
5	Czech Republic	Martin Bláha; Milan Kadlec	5	0
6	Spain	David Juaneda; Albert Torres	17	–1
7	Netherlands	Nick Stöpler; Wim Stroetinga	12	–1
8	Denmark	Michael Mørkøv; Christian Ranneries	9	–1
9	Switzerland	Silvan Dillier; Loïc Perizzolo	6	–1
10	Italy	Omar Bertazzo; Angelo Ciccone	2	–1
11	Ukraine	Sergiy Lagkuti; Mykhaylo Radionov	1	–1
12	Denmark	Casper Folsach; Mathias Møller Nielsen	0	–1
13	Netherlands	Jens Mouris; Peter Schep	0	–1
14	France	Julien Duval; Laurent Pichon	0	–1
15	Czech Republic	Vojtech Hacecky; Marek Mixa	8	–2
