= 2013 UEC European Track Championships – Men's madison =

Men's madison at the 2013 UEC European Track Championships
- UEC European Champion jersey
- Venue: Omnisport Apeldoorn, Apeldoorn
- Date: 20 October
- Competitors: 50 from 14 nations

Medalists
gold medal	Elia Viviani; Liam Bertazzo	Italy
silver medal	David Muntaner; Albert Torres	Spain
bronze medal	Kenny De Ketele; Gijs Van Hoecke	Belgium

The Men's madison was held on 20 October 2013.

== Results ==
=== Qualification ===
25 teams participated over a distance of 25 km (100 laps), with sprints every 20 laps awarding 5, 3, 2 or 1 point to the first four; teams are ranked by lap gains on their opponents, then points between teams on the same lap. The top 8 teams in each heat progressed to the final.

Heat 1

Rank	Name	Nation	Finish Order	Points	Lap Difference	Notes
1	Tristan Marguet; Claudio Imhof	Switzerland	10	0		Q
2	Andreas Graf; Patrick Konrad	Austria	11	0		Q
3	Asier Maeztu; Sebastián Mora	Spain	12	0		Q
4	Kenny De Ketele; Gijs Van Hoecke	Belgium	9	11	-1	Q
5	Elia Viviani; Liam Bertazzo	Italy	2	9	-1	Q
6	Nick Stöpler; Yoeri Havik	Netherlands	3	8	-1	Q
7	Jiří Hochmann; Martin Bláha	Czech Republic	1	7	-1	Q
8	Owain Doull; Jonathan Dibben	Great Britain	4	6	-1	Q
9	Artur Ershov; Kirill Sveshnikov	Russia	6	6	-1	
10	Vivien Brisse; Morgan Kneisky	France	7	6	-1	
11	Maximilian Beyer; Henning Bommel	Germany	6	2	−1	
12	Oleksandr Martynenko; Maksym Vasilyev	Ukraine	8	0	-1	
13	Mateusz Nowak; Mateusz Nowaczek	Poland	13	0	−2	

Heat 2

Rank	Name	Nation	Finish Order	Points	Lap Difference	Notes
1	Jan Keller; Loïc Perizzolo	Switzerland	11	0		Q
2	Damien Gaudin; Sébastien Turgot	France	2	10	-1	Q
3	David Muntaner; Albert Torres	Spain	10	10	-1	Q
4	Jens Mouris; Wim Stroetinga	Netherlands	1	8	-1	Q
5	Paolo Simion; Michele Scartezzini	Italy	4	7	-1	Q
6	Moreno De Pauw; Otto Vergaerde	Belgium	6	7	-1	Q
7	Marcel Kalz; Leif Lampater	Germany	3	4	-1	Q
8	Milan Kadlec; Vojtěch Hačecký	Czech Republic	7	4	-1	Q
9	Mikhail Radionov; Roman Lutsyshyn	Ukraine	5	0	-1	
10	Rafał Jeziorski; Wojciech Pszczolarski	Poland	8	0	-1	
11	Aleh Ahiyevich; Anton Muzychkin	Belarus	9	0	−1	
12	Evgeny Kovalev; Ivan Savitskiy	Russia	12	5	-2	

=== Final ===
16 teams participated over a distance of 50 km (200 laps), with points awarded in the same fashion.

Rank	Name	Nation	Finish Order	Points	Lap Difference
1st place, gold medalist(s)	Elia Viviani; Liam Bertazzo	Italy	2	21	
2nd place, silver medalist(s)	David Muntaner; Albert Torres	Spain	4	20	
3rd place, bronze medalist(s)	Kenny De Ketele; Gijs Van Hoecke	Belgium	3	11	-1
4	Paolo Simion; Michele Scartezzini	Italy	7	11	-1
5	Andreas Graf; Patrick Konrad	Austria	5	8	-1
6	Milan Kadlec; Vojtěch Hačecký	Czech Republic	6	8	-1
7	Moreno De Pauw; Otto Vergaerde	Belgium	9	8	-1
8	Tristan Marguet; Claudio Imhof	Switzerland	1	6	-1
9	Asier Maeztu; Sebastián Mora	Spain	12	5	-1
10	Damien Gaudin; Sébastien Turgot	France	10	4	-1
11	Jan Keller; Loïc Perizzolo	Switzerland	14	3	−1
12	Jiří Hochmann; Martin Bláha	Czech Republic	16	3	-1
13	Owain Doull; Jonathan Dibben	Great Britain	13	1	−1
14	Nick Stöpler; Yoeri Havik	Netherlands	15	1	−1
15	Marcel Kalz; Leif Lampater	Germany	8	0	−1
16	Jens Mouris; Wim Stroetinga	Netherlands	11	0	−2
