= 2011–12 UCI Track Cycling World Cup =

Multi-race cycling tournament

- Twentieth edition of the UCI Track Cycling World Cup

Details
- Dates: 4 November 2011 – 19 February 2012
- Location: Kazakhstan, Colombia, China and United Kingdom
- Races: 4

The 2011–12 UCI Track Cycling World Cup (also known as the 2011–2012 UCI Track Cycling World Cup, presented by Samsung for sponsorship reasons) was a multi-race tournament over a season of track cycling. The season ran from 4 November 2011 to 19 February 2012. The World Cup is organised by the Union Cycliste Internationale. In this edition the World Cup consisted of four rounds in Astana, Cali, Beijing and London.

The series played a key role in who qualified for the 2012 Summer Olympics and had its final round staged in the Veldorome where the 2012 Olympics were later held in London, as well as having a round in the 2008 Summer Olympics Velodrome in Beijing.

== Series ==
The 2011–12 Track Cycling World Cup took place over four rounds, in Astana, Cali, Beijing and London.

=== Astana ===
Astana in Kazakhstan was the host city for the first round of the 2011–12 UCI Track Cycling World Cup, which took place between 4 and 6 November 2011. It is the second largest city in the country and held the 2011 Asian Winter Games. The competition took place at the Saryarka Velodrome.

=== London ===
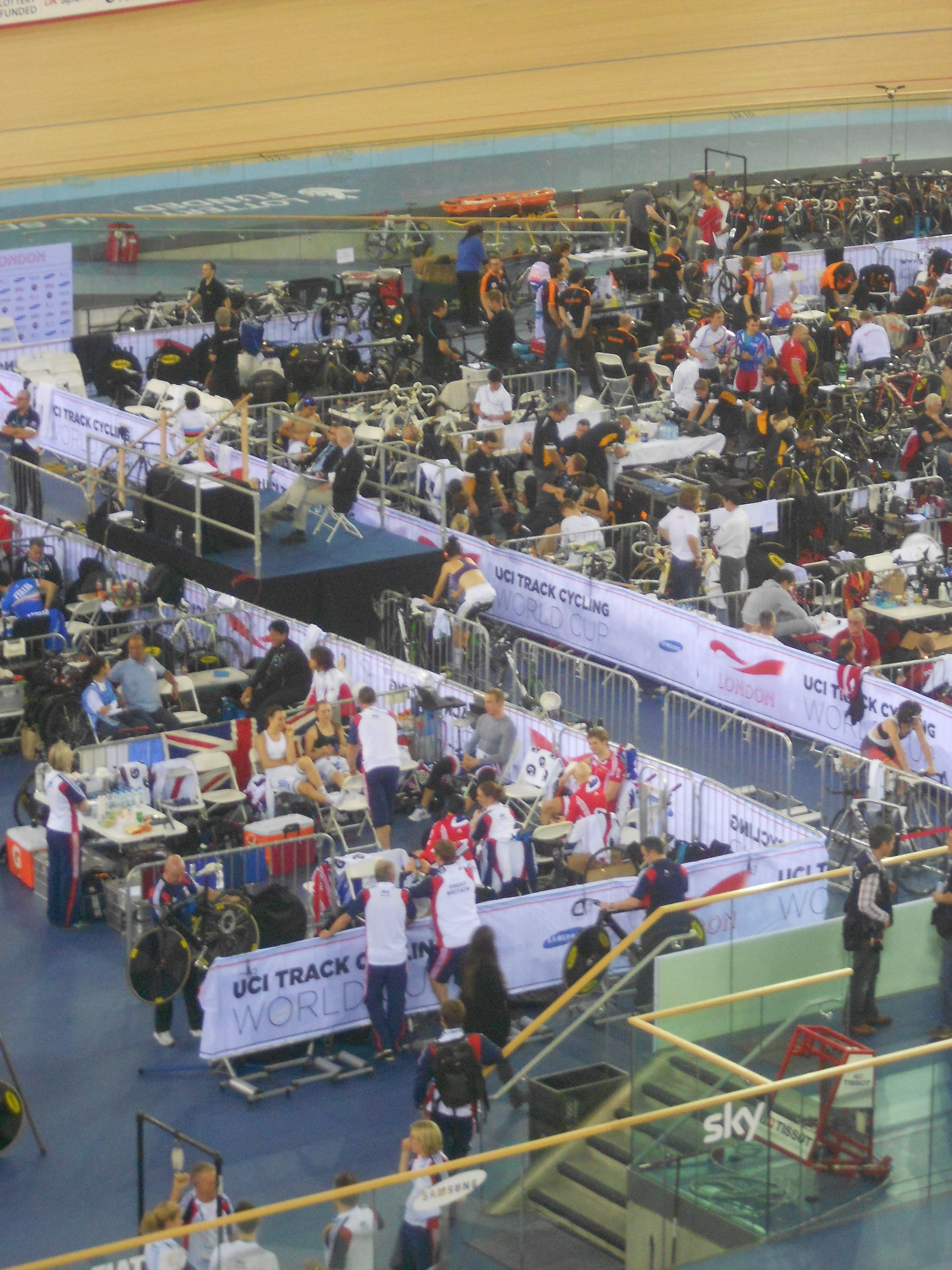
Track World Cup in London.

The fourth round took place in London between 17 and 19 February 2012, and formed part of the 'London Prepares' series of test events for the 2012 Olympics. It was the first event to take place in the Olympic velodrome.

All three medal winning teams in the women's team pursuit went under the previous world record time of 3:19.569, held by the USA. Great Britain's Dani King, Joanna Rowsell and Laura Trott set a new world record of 3:18.148.

The Australian pairing of Anna Meares and Kaarle McCulloch broke the women's team sprint world record in the qualifying round, setting a new time of 32.828. The previous time of 32.923 was also set by Australia two years previously. But, they failed to repeat the performance in the final, losing to Great Britain's Jess Varnish and Victoria Pendleton who raised the bar to set a new world record of 32.754.

== Overall team standings ==
Overall team standings are calculated based on total number of points gained by the team's riders in each event. The top ten teams after round 4 are listed below:

Rank	Team	Round 1	Round 2	Round 3	Round 4	Total points
1	Germany	107	93	18	73	291
2	France	64	71	55	57	247
3	Australia	78	30	47	86	241
4	Great Britain	44	30	13	116	203
5	China	22	19	73	44	158
6	Netherlands	63	33	22	39	157
7	New Zealand		48	51	46	145
8	Lithuania	14	41	46	30	131
9	Ukraine	42	34	32	19	127
10	Belgium	40	35	34	16	125

== Results ==
=== Men ===
Event	Winner	Second	Third
Kazakhstan, Astana — 4–6 November 2011 (PDF)
Keirin	Christos Volikakis (GRE)	Chris Hoy (GBR) (Sky Track Cycling)	Sergey Borisov (RUS) (Team MTT)
Individual pursuit	Glenn O'Shea (AUS); 4:22.048	Dominique Cornu (BEL); 4:25.738	Nikias Arndt (GER); 4:24.184
Team pursuit	Team RVL; Evgeny Kovalev; Ivan Kovalev; Alexey Markov; Alexander Serov; 3:56.127	Australia; Edward Bissaker; Alexander Edmondson; Mitchell Mulhern; Glenn O'Shea; 4:01.417	Netherlands; Levi Heimans; Jenning Huizenga; Wim Stroetinga; Arno van der Zwet; 4:04.035
Sprint	Chris Hoy (GBR) (Sky Track Cycling)	Denis Dmitriev (RUS) (Team MTT)	Shane Perkins (AUS) (Team Jayco–AIS)
Scratch race	Gijs Van Hoecke (BEL)	Ángel Colla (ARG) -1 lap	Nikias Arndt (GER) -1 lap
Madison	Australia; Alexander Edmonson; Glenn O'Shea; 22 pts	Switzerland; Silvan Dillier; Loïc Perizzolo; 14 pts	Team Lokosphinx; Artur Ershow; Kirill Sveshnikov; 12 pts
Team sprint	Team ERD; Joachim Eilers; Robert Förstemann; Maximilian Levy; 43.474	Team Jayco–AIS; Matthew Glaetzer; Shane Perkins; Scott Sunderland; 43.661	France; Mickaël Bourgain; Michaël D'Almeida; Kevin Sireau; 43.757
Omnium	Roger Kluge (GER); 24 pts	Ho Sung Cho (KOR); 34 pts	Elia Viviani (ITA); 36 pts
Colombia, Cali — 1–3 December 2011
Sprint details (PDF)	Stefan Bötticher (GER) (Team ERD)	Maximilian Levy (GER)	Robert Förstemann (GER) (Team ERD)
Kilo details (PDF)	François Pervis (FRA); 1:00.075	Simon van Velthooven (NZL); 1:01.160	Filip Ditzel (CZE); 1:02.009
Keirin details (PDF)	Maximilian Levy (GER)	François Pervis (FRA)	Hersony Canelón (VEN)
Team pursuit details (PDF)	New Zealand; Sam Bewley; Aaron Gate; Marc Ryan; Jesse Sergent caught opponents	Australia; Luke Durbridge; Rohan Dennis; Michael Hepburn; Mitchell Mulhern caught	Denmark; Niki Byrgensen; Casper Folsach; Rasmus Quaade; Christian Ranneries; 4:07.387
Team sprint details (PDF)	Germany; René Enders; Maximilian Levy; Stefan Nimke; 43.311	Germany (Team ERD); Robert Förstemann; Stefan Bötticher; Joachim Eilers; 44.230	Venezuela; César Marcano; Hersony Canelón; Ángel Pulgar; 43.991
Points race details (PDF)	Unai Elorriaga Zubiaur (ESP) (Team Cespa-Euskadi); 46 pts	Ingmar De Poortere (BEL); 37 pts	Edwin Ávila (COL); 32 pts
Ominium details (PDF)	Juan Esteban Arango (COL); 28 pts	Zach Bell (CAN); 33 pts	Bryan Coquard (FRA); 34 pts
Madison details (PDF)	Colombia; Juan Esteban Arango; Weimar Roldán; 6 pts	France; Morgan Kneisky; Vivien Brisse; 20 pts, -1 lap	Switzerland; Cyrille Thièry; Loïc Perizzolo; 12 pts, -1 lap
China, Beijing — 20–22 January 2012
Sprint details (PDF)	Charlie Conord (FRA)	Lei Zhang (CHN)	Denis Dmitriev (RUS) (Team MTT)
Individual pursuit details (PDF)	Peter Latham (NZL); 4:25.964	Mitchell Mulhern (AUS); 4:26.267	Kevin Labeque (FRA); 4:28.519
Team pursuit details (PDF)	Russia (Team RVL); Evgeny Kovalev; Ivan Kovalev; Alexey Markov; Alexander Serov; 3:57.699	Australia; Edward Bissaker; Alexander Edmondson; Michael Freiberg; Mitchell Mulhern; 4:01.802	New Zealand; Wes Gough; Cameron Karwowski; Peter Latham; Myron Simpson; 4:03.758
Team sprint details (PDF)	RUS (Team MTT); Sergei Kucherov; Denis Dmitriev; Sergey Borisov; 44.196	China; Cheng Changsong; Zheng Lei; Zheng Miao; 44.430	New Zealand; Matthew Archibald; Edward Dawkins; Simon van Velthooven; 44.827
Keirin details (PDF)	François Pervis (FRA)	Sergey Borisov (RUS) (Team MTT)	Andrew Taylor (AUS)
Scratch race details (PDF)	Kirill Sveshnikov (RUS) (Team LOK)	Albert Torres Barcelo (ESP) -1 lap	Aliaksandr Lisouski (BLR) -1 lap
Madison details (PDF)	Czech Republic; Martin Bláha; Vojtech Hacecky; 1 pt	Belgium; Kenny De Ketele; Tim Mertens; 5 pts, -1 lap	Spain; David Muntaner Juaneda; Albert Torres Barcelo; 24 pts, -2 laps
Omnium details (PDF)	Glenn O'Shea (AUS); 20 pts	Bryan Coquard (FRA); 23 pts	Nikias Arndt (GER); 32 pts
Great Britain, London — 17–19 February 2012
Sprint details (PDF)	Chris Hoy (GBR)	Maximilian Levy (GER)	Robert Förstemann (GER)
Kilo details (PDF)	Stefan Nimke (GER); 1:01.211	Michaël D'Almeida (FRA); 1:02.036	Simon van Velthooven (NZL); 1:02.048
Team pursuit details (PDF)	Australia; Jack Bobridge; Rohan Dennis; Alexander Edmondson; Michael Hepburn; 3:54.615	Great Britain; Steven Burke; Ed Clancy; Peter Kennaugh; Geraint Thomas; 3:56.330	New Zealand; Sam Bewley; Aaron Gate; Westley Gough; Marc Ryan; 3:59.242
Team sprint details (PDF)	Germany; René Enders; Robert Förstemann; Maximilian Levy; 43.562	France; Grégory Baugé; Michaël D'Almeida; Kevin Sireau; 43.631	Great Britain; Ross Edgar; Jason Kenny; Chris Hoy; 43.781
Keirin details (PDF)	Chris Hoy (GBR)	René Enders (GER)	Mickaël Bourgain (FRA)
Points Race details (PDF)	Albert Torres Barcelo (ESP); 58 pts	Kirill Sveshnikov (RUS); 42 pts	Artur Ershov (RUS); 36 pts
Omnium details (PDF)	Juan Esteban Arango (COL); 21 pts	Ho Sung Cho (KOR); 32 pts	Zach Bell (CAN); 33 pts

=== Women ===
Event	Winner	Second	Third
Kazakhstan, Astana — 4–6 November 2011
500m	Olga Panarina (BLR); 33.472	Sandie Clair (FRA); 33.950	Miriam Welte (GER); 34.172
Keirin	Clara Sanchez (FRA)	Kristina Vogel (GER)	Ekaterina Gnidenko (RUS)
Team pursuit	Netherlands; Ellen van Dijk; Kirsten Wild; Amy Pieters; 3:21.550 (NR)	China; Fan Jiang; Jiang Wenwen; Jing Liang; 3:22.079	Germany; Lisa Brennauer; Charlotte Becker; Madeleine Sandig; 3:21.701
Sprint	Lyubov Shulika (UKR)	Anna Meares (AUS)	Olga Panarina (BLR)
Points race	Na Ah-reum (KOR); 31 pts	Stephanie Pohl (GER); 30 pts	Elena Cecchini (ITA); 29 pts
Team sprint	Australia; Anna Meares; Kaarle McCulloch; 32.938	Ukraine; Olena Tsyos; Lyubov Shulika; 33.313	Germany; Miriam Welte; Kristina Vogel; 33.388
Omnium	Evgenia Romanyuta (RUS) (Team RVL); 26 pts	Dani King (GBR); 33 pts	Huang Li (CHN); 43 pts
Colombia, Cali — 1–3 December 2011
Keirin	Simona Krupeckaitė (LTU)	Kristina Vogel (GER)	Virginie Cueff (FRA)
Individual pursuit	Alison Shanks (NZL); 3:28.994	Wendy Houvenaghel (GBR); 3:33.698	Lesya Kalytovska (UKR); 3:35.983
Team pursuit	Great Britain; Laura Trott; Wendy Houvenaghel; Sarah Storey; 3:21.830	New Zealand; Lauren Ellis; Jaime Nielsen; Alison Shanks; 3:25.618	United States; Sarah Hammer; Jennie Reed; Lauren Tamayo; 3:22.090
Sprint	Kristina Vogel (GER)	Virginie Cueff (FRA)	Viktoria Baranova (RUS)
Omnium	Sarah Hammer (USA); 14 pts	Tara Whitten (CAN); 28 pts	Laura Trott (GBR); 29 pts
Scratch race	Kelly Druyts (BEL)	Katarzyna Pawłowska (POL)	Na Ah-reum (KOR)
Team sprint	Germany; 33.143	Ukraine; 33.869	Russia; 33.207
China, Beijing — 20–22 January 2012
Sprint details (PDF)	Shuang Guo (CHN)	Simona Krupeckaitė (LTU)	Junhong Lin (CHN) (Team GPC)
500m details (PDF)	Lisandra Guerra Rodriguez (CUB); 34.657	Anastasiya Voynova (RUS); 34.898	Jingjing Shi (CHN) (Team MSP); 35.012
Team pursuit details (PDF)	Ukraine; Yelyzaveta Bochkaryova; Svitlana Halyuk; Lyubov Shulika caught opponents	Belarus; Alena Dylko; Aksana Papko; Tatsiana Sharakova caught	China; Fan Jiang; Wenwen Jiang; Jing Liang; 3:22.588
Team sprint details (PDF)	China; Gong Jinjie; Guo Shuang; 33.055	Lithuania; Simona Krupeckaitė; Gintarė Gaivenytė; 33.747	China (Team MSP); Xu Yulei; Shi Jingjing; 33.831
Keirin details (PDF)	Shuang Guo (CHN)	Simona Krupeckaitė (LTU)	Daniela Larreal (VEN)
Points race details (PDF)	Aksana Papko (BLR); 15 pts	Katarzyna Pawłowska (POL); 12 pts	Victoria Kondel (RUS) (Team RVL); 10 pts
Ominium details (PDF)	Evgenia Romanyuta (RUS) (Team RVL); 27 pts	Li Huang (CHN) (Team GPC); 34 pts	Małgorzata Wojtyra (POL); 36 pts
Great Britain, London — 17–19 February 2012
Sprint details (PDF)	Shuang Guo (CHN)	Anna Meares (AUS)	Lee Wai Sze (HKG)
Individual pursuit	Joanna Rowsell (GBR); 3:32.364	Alison Shanks (NZL); 3:33.406	Amy Cure (AUS); 3:36.707
Team pursuit	Great Britain; Dani King; Joanna Rowsell; Laura Trott; 3:18.148	Canada; Gillian Carleton; Jasmin Glaesser; Tara Whitten; 3:18.982	Australia; Amy Cure; Annette Edmondson; Josephine Tomic; 3:19.164
Team sprint details (PDF)	Great Britain; Jess Varnish; Victoria Pendleton; 32.754	Australia; Anna Meares; Kaarle McCulloch; 32.945	China; Gong Jinjie; Guo Shuang; 33.060
Keirin details (PDF)	Simona Krupeckaitė (LTU)	Lee Wai Sze (HKG)	Shuang Guo (CHN)
Scratch race details (PDF)	Melissa Hoskins (AUS)	Jarmila Machačová (CZE)	Lesya Kalytovska (UKR)
Omnium details (PDF)	Sarah Hammer (USA); 30 pts	Annette Edmondson (AUS); 30 pts	Laura Trott (GBR); 32 pts
