= 2015 UEC European Track Championships – Men's madison =

Men's madison at the 2015 UEC European Track Championships
- UEC European Champion jersey
- Venue: Velodrome Suisse, Grenchen
- Date: 18 October
- Competitors: 32 from 16 nations

Medalists
gold medal	Sebastián Mora; Albert Torres	Spain
silver medal	Mikhail Radionov; Andrey Sazanov	Russia
bronze medal	Morgan Kneisky; Bryan Coquard	France

The Men's madison was held on 18 October 2015. 16 teams participated over a distance of 50 km (200 laps), with sprints every 20 laps awarding 5, 3, 2 or 1 point to the first four; teams are ranked by lap gains on their opponents, then points between teams on the same lap.

== Results ==
Rank	Name	Nation	Finish Order	Points	Lap Difference
1st place, gold medalist(s)	Sebastián Mora; Albert Torres	Spain	7	12	
2nd place, silver medalist(s)	Mikhail Radionov; Andrey Sazanov	Russia	11	0	
3rd place, bronze medalist(s)	Morgan Kneisky; Bryan Coquard	France	3	24	-1
4	Elia Viviani; Simone Consonni	Italy	1	23	-1
5	Kenny De Ketele; Moreno De Pauw	Belgium	4	19	-1
6	Andreas Müller; Andreas Graf	Austria	13	7	-1
7	Kersten Thiele; Leon Rohde	Germany	2	5	-1
8	Vladyslav Kreminskyi; Roman Gladysh	Ukraine	9	5	-1
9	Martin Bláha; Vojtěch Hačecký	Czech Republic	10	4	-1
10	Wojciech Pszczolarski; Mateusz Nowak	Poland	8	3	-1
11	Théry Schir; Stefan Küng	Switzerland	5	2	−1
12	Christopher Latham; Oliver Wood	Great Britain	15	6	−2
13	Mikhail Shemetau; Yauheni Akhramenka	Belarus	6	0	−2
14	Ivo Oliveira; Rui Oliveira	Portugal	12	0	−3
15	Mathias Møller Nielsen; Casper von Folsach	Denmark	14	0	−3
—	Wim Stroetinga; Roy Eefting	Netherlands	DNF		
