= 2012 UCI Track Cycling World Championships – Men's madison =

Rainbow jersey

The Men's madison at the 2012 UCI Track Cycling World Championships was held on April 8. 17 teams participated in the contest.

== Medalists ==
Gold	Belgium; Kenny De Ketele; Gijs Van Hoecke
Silver	Great Britain; Ben Swift; Geraint Thomas
Bronze	Australia; Leigh Howard; Cameron Meyer

== Results ==
The race was held at 21:10.

Rank	Name	Nation	Points	Laps down
1st place, gold medalist(s)	Kenny De Ketele; Gijs Van Hoecke	Belgium	24	0
2nd place, silver medalist(s)	Ben Swift; Geraint Thomas	Great Britain	18	0
3rd place, bronze medalist(s)	Leigh Howard; Cameron Meyer	Australia	11	0
4	Andreas Graf; Andreas Müller	Austria	10	0
5	Sebastián Mora Vedri; Albert Torres	Spain	7	0
6	Artur Ershov; Valery Kaykov	Russia	6	0
7	Peter Schep; Wim Stroetinga	Netherlands	5	0
8	Martin Bláha; Vojtech Hacecky	Czech Republic	4	0
9	Vivien Brisse; Bryan Coquard	France	4	−1
10	Angelo Ciccone; Elia Viviani	Italy	3	−1
11	Shane Archbold; Marc Ryan	New Zealand	1	−1
12	Franco Marvulli; Cyrille Thièry	Switzerland	0	−1
13	Henning Bommel; Lucas Liss	Germany	14	−2
14	Lasse Norman Hansen; Christian Ranneries	Denmark	2	−2
–	Choi Ki Ho; Kwok Ho Ting	Hong Kong	DNF	
–	Pavel Gatskiy; Artyom Zakharov	Kazakhstan	DNF	
–	Antonio Cabrera; Cristopher Mansilla	Chile	DNS	
