= 2016 Six Days of London =

Race details
- Dates: 25–30 October

Results
	Winner	Kenny De Ketele and Moreno De Pauw (BEL)
	Second	Bradley Wiggins and Mark Cavendish (GBR)

2016 Six Days of London was a professional track cycling event held at the Lee Valley VeloPark over six consecutive days from 25 to 30 October 2016. It was the second year the event was held since the historical Six Days of London event was resurrected in 2015. Before the event, the organisers announced that the event was to form part of a "Six Day Series", with the London event being followed by events in Amsterdam, Berlin and Copenhagen, with a "final" then being held at the Palma velodrome in Mallorca.

== Summary ==
The main competition was held over all six days, with 16 pairs of men competing to cover the largest number of laps in a series of madison events. Points were also awarded in a number of other shorter events, such as derny and elimination races, with each 100 points awarding an extra lap. Alongside this, six sprinters raced every night in match sprint and keirin races. There was also a women's omnium event which took place over the final three days.

British cycling legends Bradley Wiggins and Mark Cavendish attended the event for the first time, competing as a pair, but were defeated by reigning champions Kenny De Ketele and Moreno De Pauw and took second place instead. Both teams also competed at the Six Days of Ghent later that year, where the order was reversed, with Wiggins declaring that to be his final competitive race.

In the omnium, Katie Archibald dominated to win the overall standings, winning all of the individual events except for the 10 km points race.

Joachim Eilers won the sprinter's event.
