= 2018 UEC European Track Championships – Men's points race =

Men's points race at the 2018 UEC European Track Championships
- Venue: Sir Chris Hoy Velodrome, Glasgow
- Date: 5 August
- Competitors: 18 from 18 nations
- Winning points: 102

Medalists
gold medal	Wojciech Pszczolarski	Poland
silver medal	Kenny De Ketele	Belgium
bronze medal	Stefan Matzner	Austria

The men's points race competition at the 2018 UEC European Track Championships was held on 5 August 2018.

== Results ==
160 laps (40 km) were raced with 16 sprints.

Rank	Name	Nation	Lap points	Sprint points	Total points	Finish order
1st place, gold medalist(s)	Wojciech Pszczolarski	Poland	80	22	102	9
2nd place, silver medalist(s)	Kenny De Ketele	Belgium	60	23	83	3
3rd place, bronze medalist(s)	Stefan Matzner	Austria	60	11	71	6
4	Cyrille Thièry	Switzerland	40	19	59	2
5	Raman Ramanau	Belarus	40	16	56	12
6	Florian Maitre	France	40	14	54	10
7	Liam Bertazzo	Italy	40	11	51	5
8	Edgar Stepanyan	Armenia	20	29	49	4
9	Mark Downey	Ireland	20	25	45	16
10	Oliver Wood	Great Britain	20	9	29	7
11	Taras Shevchuk	Ukraine	20	5	25	11
12	Viktor Manakov	Russia	20	4	24	18
13	Matias Malmberg	Denmark		13	13	1
14	Yoeri Havik	Netherlands		3	3	17
15	Julio Amores	Spain		2	2	15
16	Luděk Lichnovský	Czech Republic		1	1	13
17	Viktor Filutás	Hungary		0	0	8
18	Andrej Strmiska	Slovakia	–40	0	–40	14
