= 2010 UCI Track Cycling World Championships – Men's omnium =

Track cycling tournament

Rainbow jersey

The Men's Omnium is one of the 10 men's events at the 2010 UCI Track Cycling World Championships, held in Ballerup, Denmark.

This was the fourth time a men's omnium event had ever been included in the World Championships. Eighteen from 18 countries participated in the contest. The omnium consisted of five events, which were all contested on 28 March: a sprint 200 m time trial with a flying start, scratch race, 3 km individual pursuit, points race and a 1 km time trial.

== Overall standings ==
Rank	Name	Nation	200 m TT	Scratch	Pursuit	Points Race	1 km TT	Total
1st place, gold medalist(s)	Ed Clancy	Great Britain	1	13	4	5	1	24
2nd place, silver medalist(s)	Leigh Howard	Australia	11	3	6	8	4	32
3rd place, bronze medalist(s)	Taylor Phinney	United States	6	10	1	14	2	33
4	Robert Bartko	Germany	10	2	10	3	11	36
5	Tim Veldt	Netherlands	2	14	8	10	3	37
6	Juan Arango	Colombia	14	4	7	6	9	40
7	Tim Mertens	Belgium	13	1	13	1	13	41
8	David Muntaner	Spain	8	6	2	13	14	43
9	Vitaliy Shchedov	Ukraine	12	16	3	7	8	46
10	Myron Simpson	New Zealand	4	11	11	15	6	47
11	Alois Kaňkovský	Czech Republic	3	15	9	17	5	49
12	Elia Viviani	Italy	7	5	12	9	16	49
13	Victor Manakov	Russia	16	9	5	12	10	52
14	Daniel Kreutzfeldt	Denmark	17	7	14	4	15	57
15	Kwok Ho Ting	Hong Kong	18	8	17	2	17	62
16	Grzegorz Stepniak	Poland	9	17	15	16	7	64
17	Ghislain Boiron	France	5	18	16	18	12	69
18	Kazuhiro Mori	Japan	15	12	18	11	18	74
