= 2010 UCI Track Cycling World Championships – Men's madison =

Men's madison at the 2010 UCI Track Cycling World Championships
- Venue: Ballerup
- Date: 27 March 2010

The Men's Madison is one of the 10 men's events at the 2010 UCI Track Cycling World Championships, held in Ballerup, Denmark.

18 teams, each of two riders participated in the contest. The Final was held on 27 March.

== Results ==
Rank	Name	Nation	Points	Laps down
1st place, gold medalist(s)	Leigh Howard; Cameron Meyer	Australia	16	
2nd place, silver medalist(s)	Morgan Kneisky; Christophe Riblon	France	6	
3rd place, bronze medalist(s)	Ingmar De Poortere; Steve Schets	Belgium	5	
4	Michael Mørkøv; Alex Rasmussen	Denmark	17	−1
5	Robert Bartko; Roger Kluge	Germany	16	−1
6	Sergey Kolesnikov; Alexey Shmidt	Russia	13	−1
7	Angelo Ciccone; Elia Viviani	Italy	9	−1
8	Sebastian Donadio; Walter Pérez	Argentina	8	−1
9	Daniel Holloway; Colby Pearce	United States	7	−1
10	Andreas Graf; Georg Tazreiter	Austria	2	−1
11	Peter Schep; Danny Stam	Netherlands	0	−1
12	Martin Bláha; Jiří Hochmann	Czech Republic	0	−1
13	Choi Ki Ho; Wong Kam-po	Hong Kong	0	−1
14	Marc Ryan; Thomas Scully	New Zealand	0	−1
15	Alexander Äschbach; Franco Marvulli	Switzerland	6	−2
16	Sergiy Lagkuti; Mykhaylo Radionov	Ukraine	0	−3
	Unai Elorriaga Zubiaur; Toni Tauler	Spain	2	DNF
	Lukasz Bujko; Dawid Glowacki	Poland	3	DNF
