= Ingmar De Poortere =

Belgian cyclist

Personal information
- Full name: Ingmar De Poortere
- Born: 27 May 1984 (age 42) Ghent, Belgium
- Height: 1.82 m (6 ft 0 in)
- Weight: 70 kg (154 lb)

Cycling career
- Sport: Cycling
- Current team: Retired
- Disciplines: Road, Track
- Role: Rider

Amateur team
- 2003: Quick Step–Davitamon–Latexco

Professional teams
- 2005–2009: Bodysol–Win for Life–Jong Vlaanderen
- 2010–2011: Qin Cycling Team
- 2012: Jong Vlaanderen
Medal record
Representing Belgium
Men's track cycling
World Championships
Bronze medal – third place	2010 Ballerup	Madison

Ingmar De Poortere (born 27 May 1984 in Ghent) is a Belgian former professional racing cyclist.

== Major results ==
2000
3rd, National U17 Omnium Championship
2001
3rd, National U19 Points race Championship, Ghent
2002
1st, Omloop der Vlaamse Gewesten – U19 version, Duffel
3rd, Ledegem–Kemmel–Ledegem – U19 version, Ledegem
2003
2nd, UIV Cup Ghent, U23 (with Steve Schets)
2005
2nd, National Madison Championship, Ghent
2nd, UIV Cup München, U23 (with Nicky Cocquyt)
3rd, UIV Cup Rotterdam, U23 (with Tim Mertens)
2006
Belgium Team Pursuit Champion, Ghent (with Mertens/Schets/De Ketele)
3rd, Overall, Ronde van Antwerpen

1st, Stage 1, Booischot

2007
Belgium Scratch Champion, Ghent
Belgium Team Pursuit Champion, Ghent (with Mertens/De Ketele/Cornu)
1st, Overall, UIV Cup, U23 (with Tim Mertens)

1st, Rotterdam
1st, Berlin
1st, København

1st, Stage 5a, Volta Ciclista Internacional a Lleida, Lleida
2nd, National Pursuit Championship, Ghent
2nd, National Derny Championship, Ghent
3rd, National Pursuit Championship, Ghent
3rd, National Madison Championship, Ghent (with Davy Tuytens)
