= Kenny De Ketele =

Belgian racing cyclist

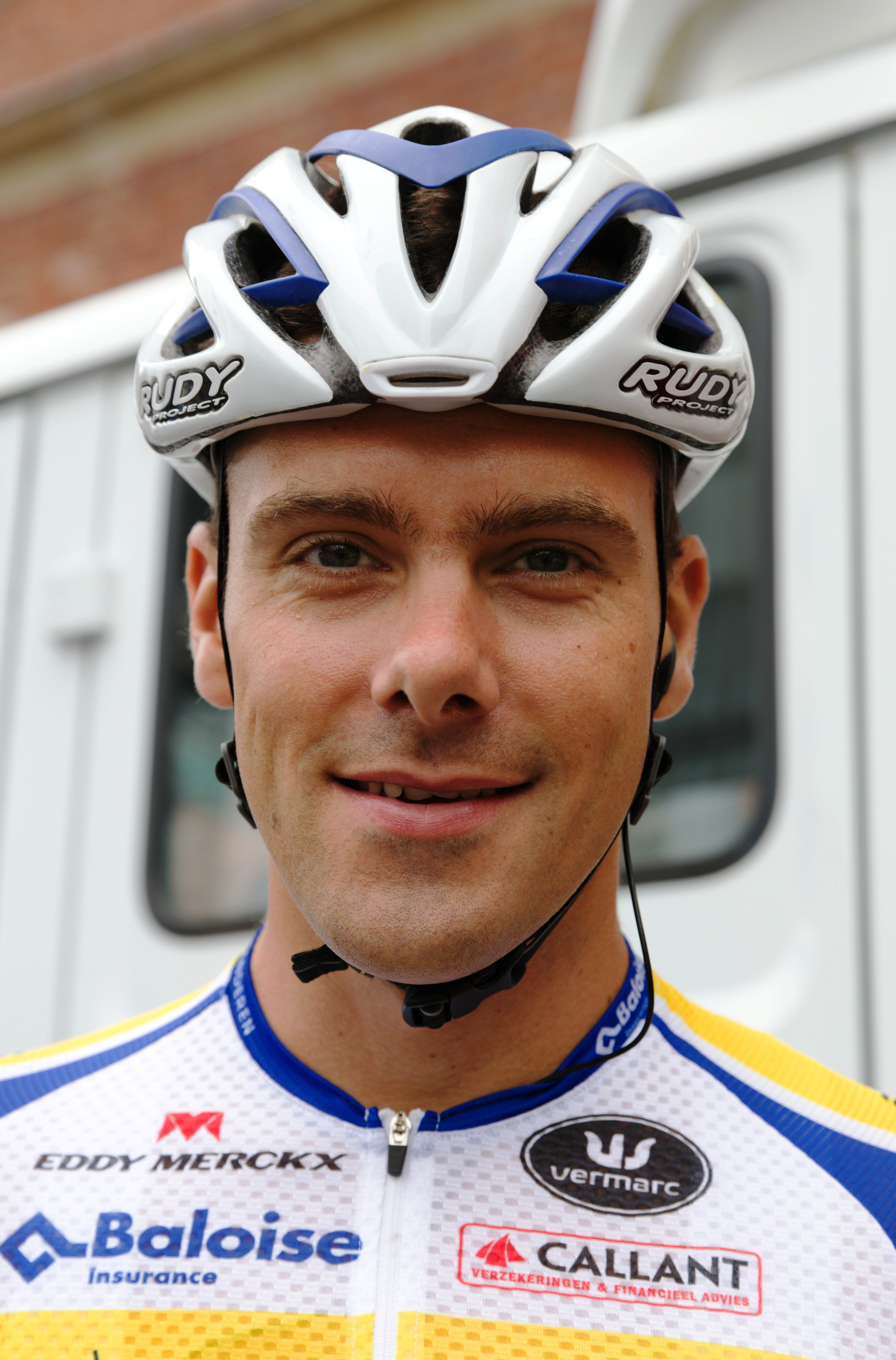
- De Ketele in 2018

Personal information
- Born: 5 June 1985 (age 41) Oudenaarde, Belgium
- Height: 1.78 m (5 ft 10 in)
- Weight: 66 kg (146 lb)

Cycling career
- Sport: Cycling
- Current team: Team Flanders–Baloise
- Disciplines: Track; Road
- Role: Rider (retired); Directeur sportif

Amateur teams
- 2003: Victaulic Europe
- 2004: Jong Vlaanderen 2016
- 2005–2007: Bodysol–Win for Life–Jong Vlaanderen

Professional team
- 2007–2021: Chocolade Jacques–Topsport Vlaanderen

Managerial team
- 2022–: Sport Vlaanderen–Baloise

Major wins
- Track World Championships Madison (2012)
Medal record
Men's track cycling
Representing Belgium
World Championships
Gold medal – first place	2012 Melbourne	Madison
Silver medal – second place	2017 Hong Kong	Points race
Silver medal – second place	2021 Roubaix	Points race
Bronze medal – third place	2012 Melbourne	Points race
Bronze medal – third place	2016 London	Points race
Bronze medal – third place	2017 Hong Kong	Madison
Bronze medal – third place	2019 Pruszków	Madison
Bronze medal – third place	2021 Roubaix	Madison
European Championships
Gold medal – first place	2011 Apeldoorn	Madison
Gold medal – first place	2015 Hannover	Derny
Gold medal – first place	2018 Glasgow	Madison
Silver medal – second place	2010 Pruszków	Madison
Silver medal – second place	2014 Guadeloupe	Madison
Silver medal – second place	2016 Yvelines	Points race
Silver medal – second place	2018 Glasgow	Points race
Silver medal – second place	2021 Grenchen	Madison
Bronze medal – third place	2013 Apeldoorn	Madison
Bronze medal – third place	2016 Yvelines	Madison

Kenny De Ketele (born 5 June 1985) is a Belgian former professional racing cyclist, who rode professionally between 2007 and 2021, entirely for UCI ProTeam Sport Vlaanderen–Baloise. He won eight medals at the UCI Track Cycling World Championships, including a gold medal in the Madison at the 2012 UCI Track Cycling World Championships, partnering Gijs Van Hoecke. Following his retirement, De Ketele became a directeur sportif with Sport Vlaanderen–Baloise.

== Major results ==
=== Road ===
2003
2nd Tour of Flanders Juniors
2nd Trofee der Vlaamse Ardennen
2005
2nd Overall Ronde van Vlaams-Brabant
3rd Kaarst-Büttgen
2006
9th Overall Triptyque des Barrages
2007
3rd GP Frans Melckenbeeck
7th Overall Giro del Capo
2011
1st Sprints classification, Vuelta a Burgos
2015
7th Grand Prix Criquielion
2018
9th Overall Rás Tailteann

=== Track ===
2002
2nd Individual pursuit, National Junior Championships
2003
National Junior Championships

1st Individual pursuit
1st Points race
2nd Scratch
3rd Kilo

2nd Points race, UEC European Junior Championships
2004
1st Madison, UEC European Under-23 Championships (with Iljo Keisse)
National Championships

1st Individual pursuit
1st Kilo

UIV Cup U23

1st Ghent (with Steve Schets)
2nd Amsterdam (with Steve Schets)
2nd Munich (with Steve Schets)

2005
National Championships

1st Madison (with Steve Schets)
2nd Omnium

2nd Madison, UEC European Under-23 Championships (with Steve Schets)
UCI World Cup Classics

2nd Madison, Manchester (with Wouter Van Mechelen)
3rd Madison, Moscow (with Steve Schets)

2nd Overall UIV Cup U23 (with Steve Schets)

1st Munich
2nd Bremen
2nd Berlin
3rd Copenhagen

2006
1st Madison, UEC European Under-23 Championships (with Steve Schets)
National Championships

1st Kilo
1st Team pursuit
2nd Individual pursuit
3rd Omnium

2007
UEC European Under-23 Championships

1st Points race
3rd Team pursuit

National Championships

1st Points race
1st Derny
2nd Scratch
3rd Individual pursuit

2nd Madison, UCI World Cup Classics, Los Angeles (with Steve Schets)
2008
National Championships

1st Derny
1st Team pursuit
1st Madison (with Iljo Keisse)
1st Kilo
1st Omnium
2nd Points race
2nd Individual pursuit
3rd Scratch

UCI World Cup Classics

1st Madison, Los Angeles (with Tim Mertens)
2nd Madison, Manchester (with Iljo Keisse)

2nd Six Days of Fiorenzuola (with Iljo Keisse)
2nd Six Days of Hasselt (with Iljo Keisse)
3rd Six Days of Ghent (with Andreas Beikirch)
2009
1st Derny, UEC European Championships
1st Madison, UCI World Cup Classics, Manchester (with Tim Mertens)
1st Six Days of Hasselt (with Bruno Risi)
3rd Six Days of Berlin (with Roger Kluge)
2010
2nd Madison, UEC European Championships (with Tim Mertens)
2nd Six Days of Ghent (with Leif Lampater)
2011
1st Madison, UEC European Championships (with Iljo Keisse)
1st Six Days of Ghent (with Robert Bartko)
2012
UCI World Championships

1st Madison (with Gijs Van Hoecke)
3rd Points race

1st Six Days of Zürich (with Peter Schep)
2nd Madison, UCI World Cup, Beijing (with Tim Mertens)
2nd Six Days of Ghent (with Gijs Van Hoecke)
3rd Six Days of Berlin (with Iljo Keisse)
2013
1st Six Days of Amsterdam (with Gijs Van Hoecke)
International Belgian Open

1st Madison (with Jasper De Buyst)
1st Points race

UCI World Cup

2nd Madison, Aguascalientes (with Jasper De Buyst)
3rd Team pursuit, Glasgow

2nd Six Days of Berlin (with Luke Roberts)
2nd Six Days of Zürich (with Jasper De Buyst)
3rd Madison, UEC European Championships (with Gijs Van Hoecke)
3rd Six Days of Ghent (with Gijs Van Hoecke)
2014
1st Six Days of Berlin (with Andreas Müller)
1st Six Days of Ghent (with Jasper De Buyst)
International Belgian Open

1st Madison (with Roy Pieters)
2nd Points race

UCI World Cup

2nd Madison, Guadalajara (with Jasper De Buyst)
2nd Points race, London

2nd Madison, UEC European Championships (with Otto Vergaerde)
2nd Six Days of Rotterdam (with Jasper De Buyst)
3rd Six Days of Zürich (with Jasper De Buyst)
2015
1st Derny, UEC European Championships
1st Six Days of London (with Moreno De Pauw)
2nd Six Days of Berlin (with David Muntaner)
2nd Six Days of Ghent (with Gijs Van Hoecke)
3rd Madison, International Belgian Open (with Jules Hesters)
2016
1st Madison, National Championships (with Moreno De Pauw)
UCI World Cup

1st Madison, Apeldoorn (with Robbe Ghys)
2nd Team pursuit, Apeldoorn
3rd Madison, Glasgow (with Moreno De Pauw)

1st Six Days of Amsterdam (with Moreno De Pauw)
1st Six Days of Berlin (with Moreno De Pauw)
1st Six Days of Bremen (with Christian Grasmann)
1st Six Days of London (with Moreno De Pauw)
UEC European Championships

2nd Points race
3rd Madison (with Moreno De Pauw)

2nd Six Days of Copenhagen (with Moreno De Pauw)
2nd Six Days of Ghent (with Moreno De Pauw)
3rd Points race, UCI World Championships
2017
UCI World Cup

1st Madison, Milton (with Lindsay De Vylder)
2nd Madison, Pruszków (with Moreno De Pauw)
3rd Points race, Milton

1st Six Days Final, Mallorca (with Moreno De Pauw)
1st Six Days of Ghent (with Moreno De Pauw)
UCI World Championships

2nd Points race
3rd Madison with Moreno De Pauw)

2nd Six Days of Berlin (with Moreno De Pauw)
2nd Six Days of Copenhagen (with Moreno De Pauw)
3rd Six Days of London (with Moreno De Pauw)
2018
UEC European Championships

1st Madison (with Robbe Ghys)
2nd Points race

1st Six Days of Bremen (with Theo Reinhardt)
1st Six Days of Copenhagen (with Michael Mørkøv)
1st Six Days of Rotterdam (with Moreno De Pauw)
2nd Team pursuit, UCI World Cup, London
2nd Six Days of Berlin (with Moreno De Pauw)
2nd Six Days of Ghent (with Robbe Ghys)
2019
1st Six Days of Copenhagen (with Moreno De Pauw)
1st Six Days of Ghent (with Robbe Ghys)
1st Hong Kong, Six Day Series (with Yoeri Havik)
3rd Madison, UCI World Championships (with Robbe Ghys)
2020
1st Six Days of Bremen (with Nils Politt)
2021
1st Six Days of Ghent (with Robbe Ghys)
UCI World Championships

2nd Points race
3rd Madison (with Robbe Ghys)

2nd Madison, UEC European Championships (with Lindsay De Vylder)
