= Andrey Sazanov =

Russian cyclist

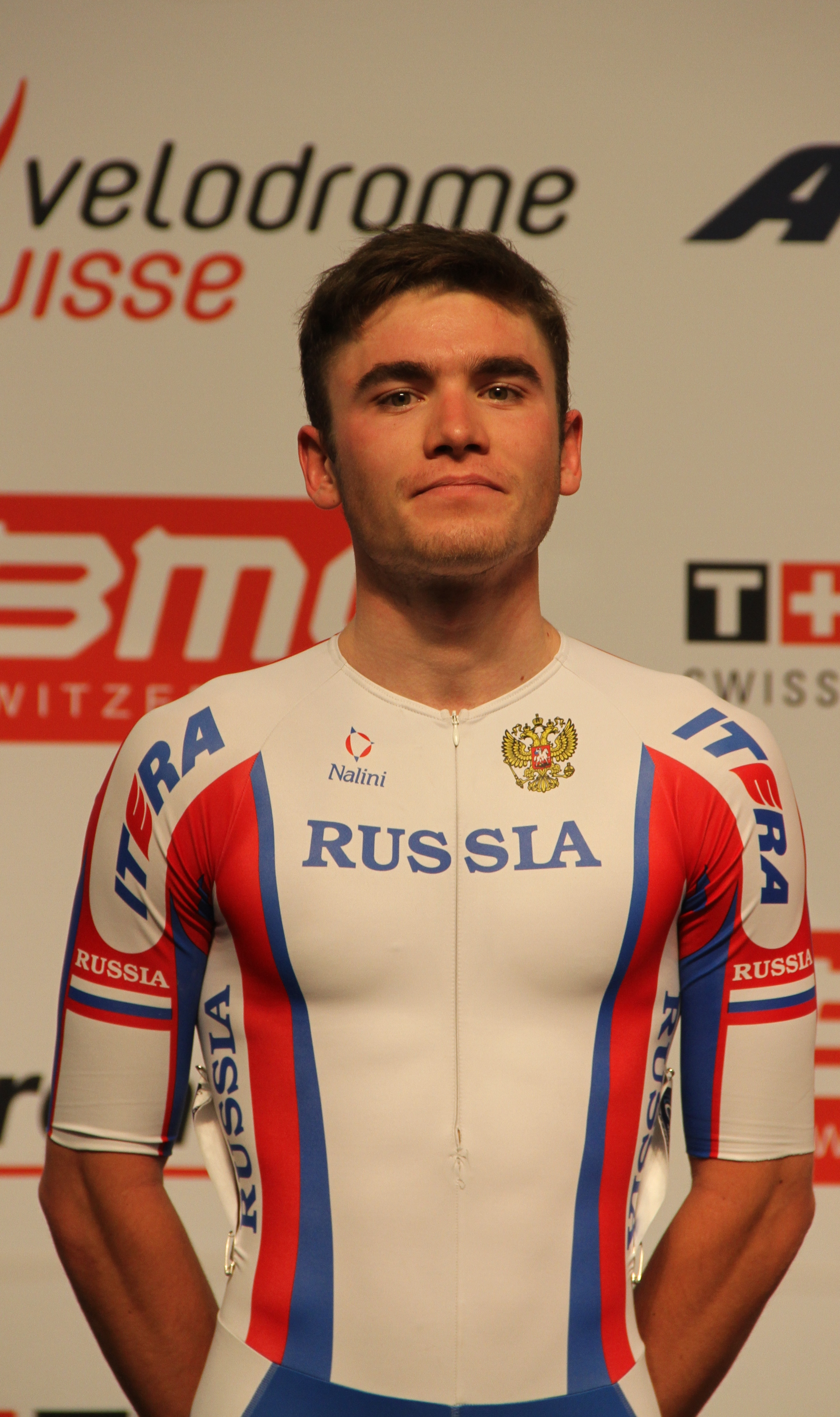
- Sazanov at the 2015 UEC European Track Championships

Personal information
- Born: 25 January 1994 (age 32) Russia

Cycling career
- Sport: Cycling
- Disciplines: Road cycling Track cycling

Professional teams
- 2014: Russian Helicopters
- 2015-2016: GM Cycling Team
Medal record
Representing Russia
European Track Championships
Silver medal – second place	2015 Grenchen	Madison

Andrey Sazanov (born 25 January 1994) is a road and track cyclist from Russia. As a junior and under-23 rider he won several medals at the European Track Championships In 2015 he won as an elite the silver medal in the madison at the 2015 UEC European Track Championships in Grenchen, Switzerland. On the road he won the third stage in the 2013 Baltic Chain Tour. He rode with the GM Cycling Team in 2015.

== Major results ==
2013
1st Stage 3 Baltic Chain Tour
2014
1st Stage 3 Grand Prix of Adygeya
2018
1st Stage 1 Five Rings of Moscow
