= 2017 UCI Track Cycling World Championships – Men's madison =

Men's madison at the 2017 UCI Track Cycling World Championships
- Venue: Hong Kong Velodrome
- Location: Hong Kong
- Dates: 16 April 2017
- Competitors: 30 from 15 nations
- Teams: 15
- Winning points: 45

Medalists
gold medal	Morgan Kneisky; Benjamin Thomas	France
silver medal	Cameron Meyer; Callum Scotson	Australia
bronze medal	Moreno De Pauw; Kenny De Ketele	Belgium

The Men's madison competition at the 2017 World Championships was held on 16 April 2017.

== Results ==
200 laps (50km) with 20 sprints were raced.

Rank	Name	Nation	Points	Laps down
1st place, gold medalist(s)	Morgan Kneisky; Benjamin Thomas	France	45	
2nd place, silver medalist(s)	Cameron Meyer; Callum Scotson	Australia	41	
3rd place, bronze medalist(s)	Moreno De Pauw; Kenny De Ketele	Belgium	32	
4	Niklas Larsen; Casper von Folsach	Denmark	22	
5	Tristan Marguet; Claudio Imhof	Switzerland	12	
6	Felix English; Mark Downey	Ireland	12	
7	Albert Torres; Sebastián Mora	Spain	11	−1
8	Wim Stroetinga; Yoeri Havik	Netherlands	5	
9	Theo Reinhardt; Henning Bommel	Germany	−15	−1
10	Liam Bertazzo; Simone Consonni	Italy	−16	−1
11	Alan Banaszek; Daniel Staniszewski	Poland	−35	−2
12	Jiří Hochmann; Martin Bláha	Czech Republic	−39	−2
–	Mark Stewart; Oliver Wood	Great Britain	DNF	
–	Andreas Müller; Andreas Graf	Austria	DNF	
–	Leung Ka Yu; Leung Chun Wing	Hong Kong	DNF	
