= Steve Schets =

Belgian cyclist

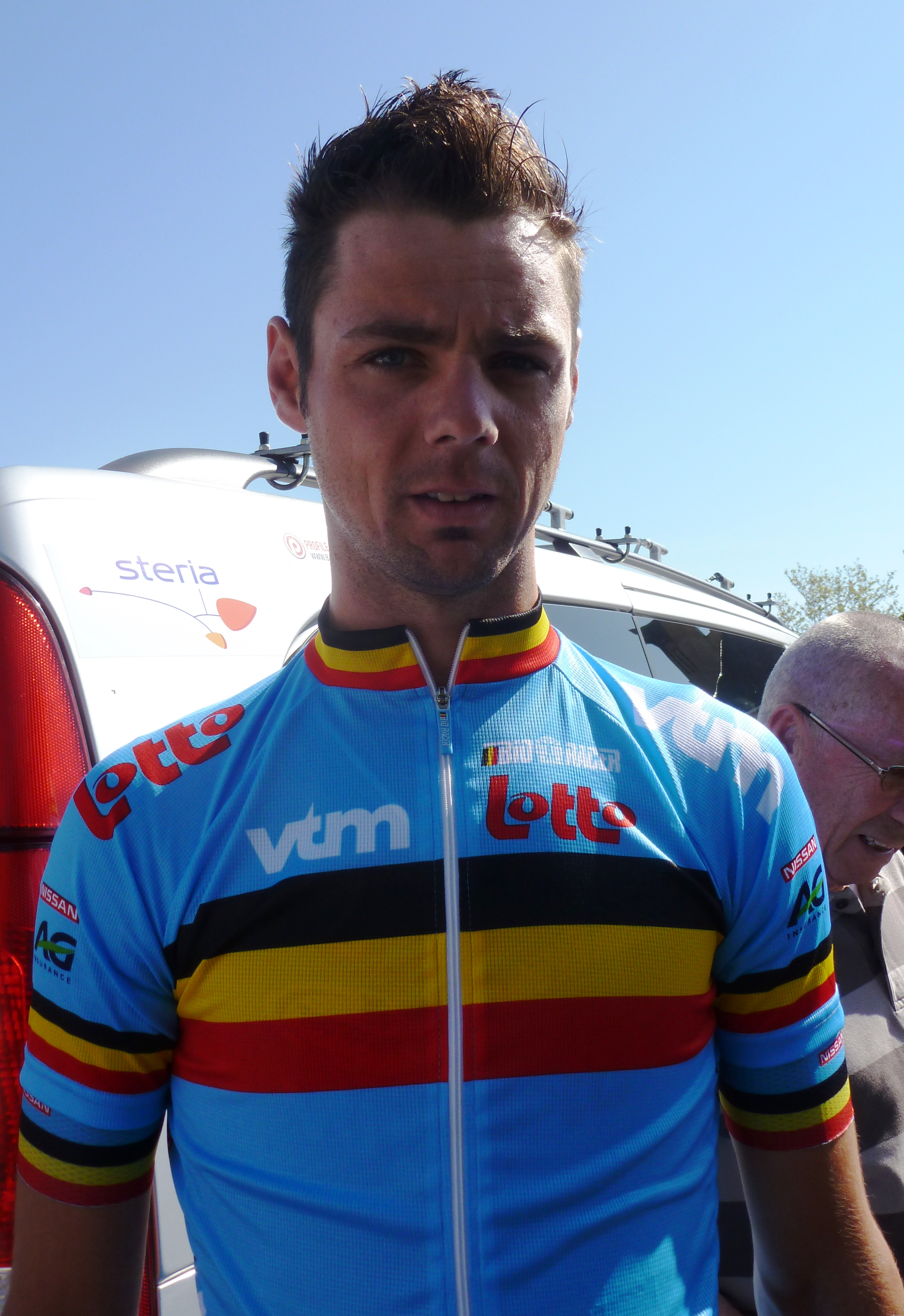

Personal information
- Born: April 20, 1984 (age 42) Ninove, Belgium
- Height: 1.88 m (6 ft 2 in)
- Weight: 74 kg (163 lb)

Cycling career
- Sport: Cycling
- Current team: Retired
- Disciplines: Road; Track
- Role: Rider

Professional teams
- 2004–2007: Jong Vlaanderen
- 2007–2008: Chocolade Jacques–Topsport Vlaanderen
- 2009–2010: Jong Vlaanderen–Bauknecht
- 2011: Donckers Koffie–Jelly Belly
- 2012: Jong Vlaanderen
- 2013: Doltcini Flanders

Major wins
- Handzame Classic (2011)
Medal record
Representing Belgium
Men's track cycling
UCI Track Cycling World Championships
Bronze medal – third place	2010 Ballerup	Madison

Steve Schets (born 20 April 1984) is a Belgian former professional road and track cyclist. On April 27, 2013, he crashed and broke his elbow. This caused him to decide to retire from professional cycling.

== Major results ==
=== Road ===
2004
1st GP Stad Vilvoorde
3rd Brussels–Zepperen
2005
1st Stage 4 Tour de Berlin
1st Stage 4 Ronde van Antwerpen
2nd Brussels–Zepperen
3rd Beverbeek Classic
2006
1st Stage 1 Tour de Berlin
2009
10th Omloop van het Houtland
2010
5th Beverbeek Classic
2011
1st Handzame Classic
3rd Dorpenomloop Rucphen
6th Nationale Sluitingprijs
10th GP Impanis-Van Petegem
2012
3rd Grand Prix de la ville de Nogent-sur-Oise
6th Dorpenomloop Rucphen
8th Arno Wallaard Memorial

=== Track ===
2003
UIV Cup U23

1st Ghent (with Kenny De Ketele)
2nd Amsterdam (with Kenny De Ketele)
2nd Munich (with Kenny De Ketele)

2004
1st Points race, National Track Championships
2nd Overall UIV Cup U23 (with Kenny De Ketele)

1st Munich
2nd Bremen
2nd Berlin
3rd Copenhagen

2005
1st Madison, National Track Championships (with Kenny De Ketele)
2nd Madison, UEC European Under-23 Championships (with Kenny De Ketele)
2005–06 UCI World Cup

3rd Madison, Moscow (with Kenny De Ketele)

2006
1st Madison, UEC European Under-23 Championships (with Kenny De Ketele)
National Track Championships

1st Scratch
1st Team pursuit (with Kenny De Ketele, Ingmar De Poortere and Tim Mertens)

2007
2005–06 UCI World Cup

2nd Madison, Los Angeles (with Kenny De Ketele)

2010
3rd Madison, UCI World Championships (with Ingmar De Poortere)
