= Gijs Van Hoecke =

Belgian racing cyclist

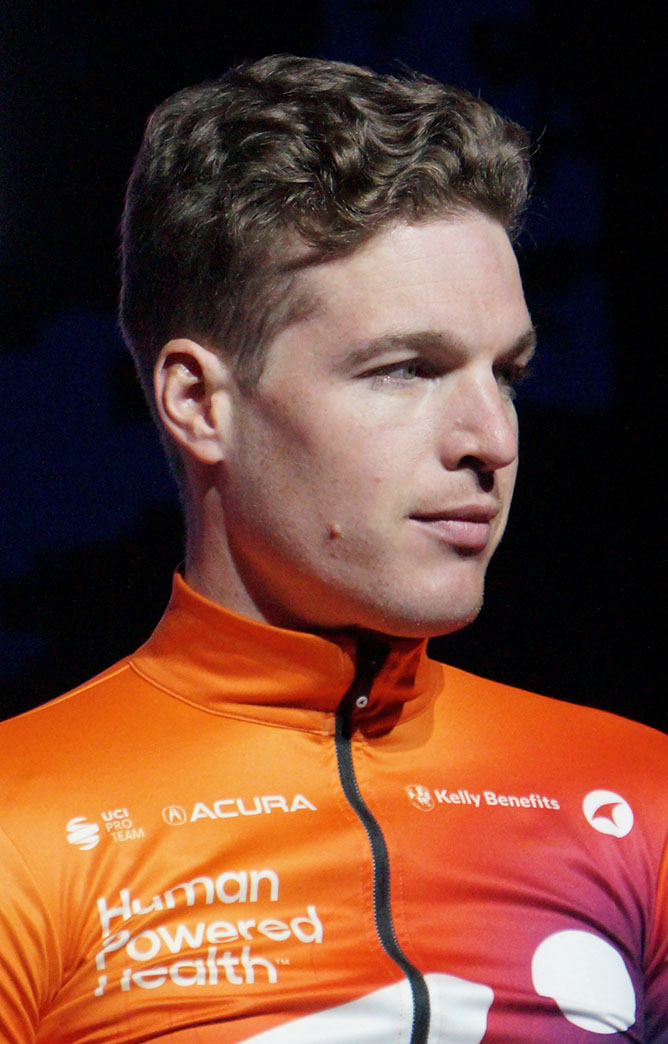
- Van Hoecke in 2023

Personal information
- Born: 12 November 1991 (age 34) Ghent, Belgium
- Height: 186 cm (6 ft 1 in)
- Weight: 75 kg (165 lb)

Cycling career
- Sport: Cycling
- Current team: Intermarché–Wanty
- Disciplines: Road; Track
- Role: Rider

Amateur teams
- 2010: Beveren 2000
- 2011: Omega Pharma–Lotto Davo

Professional teams
- 2012–2016: Topsport Vlaanderen–Mercator
- 2017–2018: LottoNL–Jumbo
- 2019–2020: CCC Team
- 2021–2022: AG2R Citroën Team
- 2023: Human Powered Health
- 2024–2025: Intermarché–Wanty

Major wins
- Track World Championships Madison (2012)
Medal record
Men's track cycling
Representing Belgium
World Championships
Gold medal – first place	2012 Melbourne	Madison
Bronze medal – third place	2011 Apeldoorn	Omnium

Gijs Van Hoecke (born 12 November 1991) is a retired Belgian cyclist, who last rode for UCI WorldTeam Intermarché–Wanty.

== Career ==
In 2011, when he was 19 years old, he was selected to participate at the Track Cycling World Championships, where he won the bronze medal in the Men's omnium. One year later, at the World Championships in Melbourne, he finished ninth in the same event and became Madison World Champion.

At the 2012 Summer Olympics, he competed in the Men's team pursuit for the Belgian national team, and the men's omnium.

Van Hoecke won the bronze medal at the Madison in the 2013 European Track Championships. During that year, he also won his first six-day race in Amsterdam.

In 2014, Van Hoecke won the Internationale Wielertrofee Jong Maar Moedig road race. In May 2018, he was named in the startlist for the 2018 Giro d'Italia.

In August 2018 he announced that he would join the CCC Team for 2019, working as a domestique for his training partner, Greg Van Avermaet. Van Hoecke remained with the team into the 2020 season; that August, it was announced that Van Hoecke would join the AG2R Citroën Team on a two-year contract, from the start of the 2021 season.

== Major results ==
=== Road ===
2009
1st Overall Giro della Toscana Juniors
5th Overall Münsterland Tour
2011
1st Overall Ronde van de Provincie Antwerpen
2nd Paris–Tours Espoirs
2012
3rd Ronde van Zeeland Seaports
2013
2nd Grand Prix Criquielion
2014
1st Internationale Wielertrofee Jong Maar Moedig
2015
1st Combativity classification, Eneco Tour
8th Internationale Wielertrofee Jong Maar Moedig
10th Overall Ster ZLM Toer
10th Ronde van Limburg
2016
6th Overall Danmark Rundt
8th Overall Ster ZLM Toer
2019
6th Overall Okolo Slovenska
2021
9th Grand Prix of Aargau Canton

==== Grand Tour general classification results timeline ====
Grand Tour	2018	2019	2020	2021	2022	2023	2024	2025
Giro d'Italia	122	—	—	—	—	—	—	153
Tour de France	—	—	—	—	—	—	—	—
Vuelta a España	—	—	—	—	—	—	—	—

Legend
—	Did not compete
DNF	Did not finish

=== Track ===
2008
2nd Madison, UCI World Junior Championships
National Junior Championships

2nd Omnium
2nd Team pursuit
2nd Kilo
2nd Individual pursuit

2009
1st Omnium, National Junior Championships
2nd Madison, UCI World Junior Championships (with Jochen Deweer)
2010
2nd Omnium, UEC European Under-23 Championships
2nd Scratch, UCI World Cup Classics, Cali
2011
1st Scratch, UCI World Cup, Astana
3rd Omnium, UCI World Championships
2012
1st Madison, UCI World Championships (with Kenny De Ketele)
UEC European Under-23 Championships

2nd Madison (with Jasper De Buyst)
3rd Team pursuit

2nd Six Days of Ghent (with Kenny De Ketele)
3rd Team pursuit, UCI World Cup, Glasgow
2013
1st Six Days of Amsterdam (with Kenny De Ketele)
3rd Madison, UEC European Championships (with Kenny De Ketele)
3rd Six Days of Ghent (with Kenny De Ketele)
2015
2nd Six Days of Ghent (with Kenny De Ketele)
3rd Six Days of London (with Iljo Keisse)
