= Stefan Matzner =

Austrian cyclist

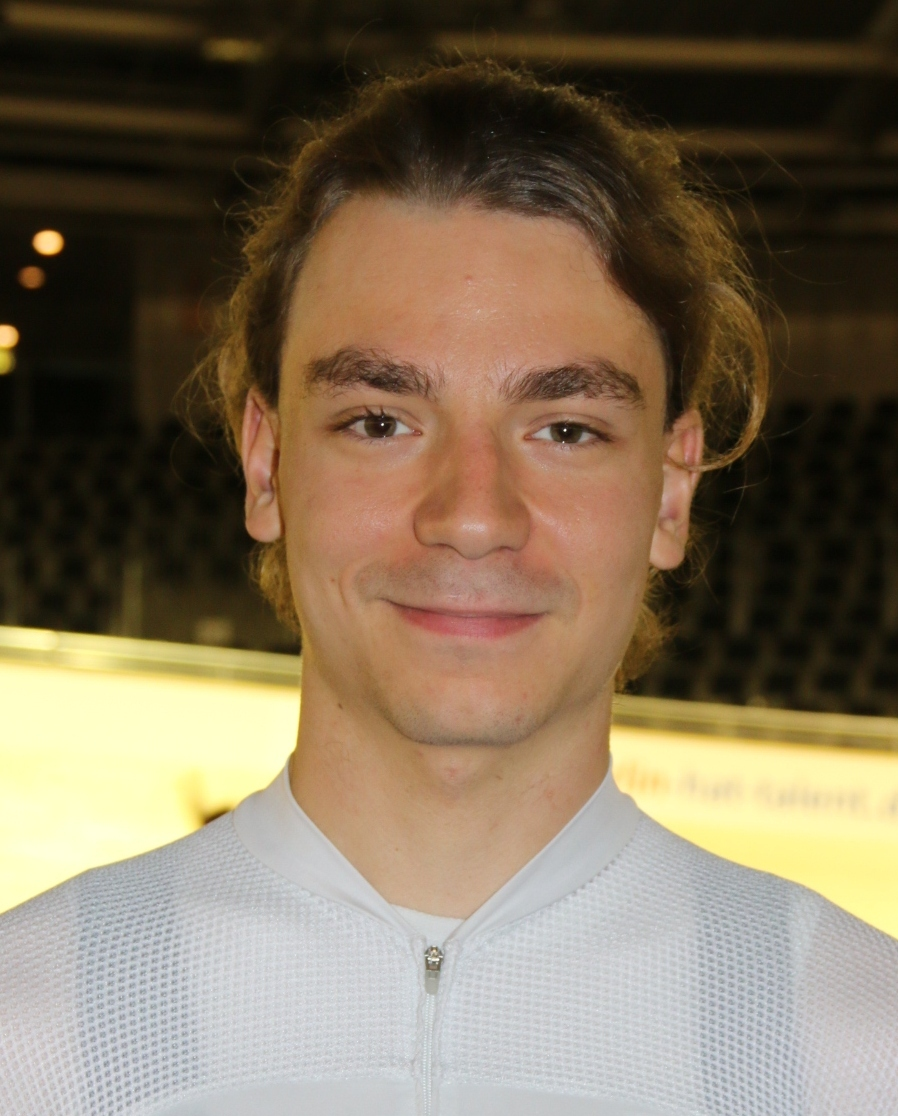
- Matzner in 2017

Personal information
- Born: 24 April 1993 (age 33) Korneuburg, Austria

Cycling career
- Sport: Cycling
- Current team: Arbö Denzel Cliff Wien
- Discipline: Track
- Role: Rider

Amateur teams
- 2015: Baier Landshut
- 2016–: Arbö Denzel Cliff Wien

Professional team
- 2013: Arbö–Gebrüder Weiss–Oberndorfer
Medal record
European Championships
Bronze medal – third place	2018 Glasgow	Points race

Stefan Matzner (born 24 April 1993) is an Austrian track cyclist.

== Major results ==
2013
National Track Championships

1st Scratch
1st Madison
2nd Pursuit
2nd Points race
2nd Kilometer

2015
National Track Championships

1st Scratch
2nd Pursuit
2nd Omnium

2016
National Track Championships

1st Sprint
2nd Team sprint
2nd Madison
2nd Pursuit
3rd Scratch

2017
National Track Championships

1st Points Race
1st Kilometer
2nd Pursuit
2nd Omnium
2nd Sprint
2nd Madison

2018
National Track Championships

1st Sprint
2nd Kilometer
