= Leigh Howard =

Australian racing cyclist (born 1989)

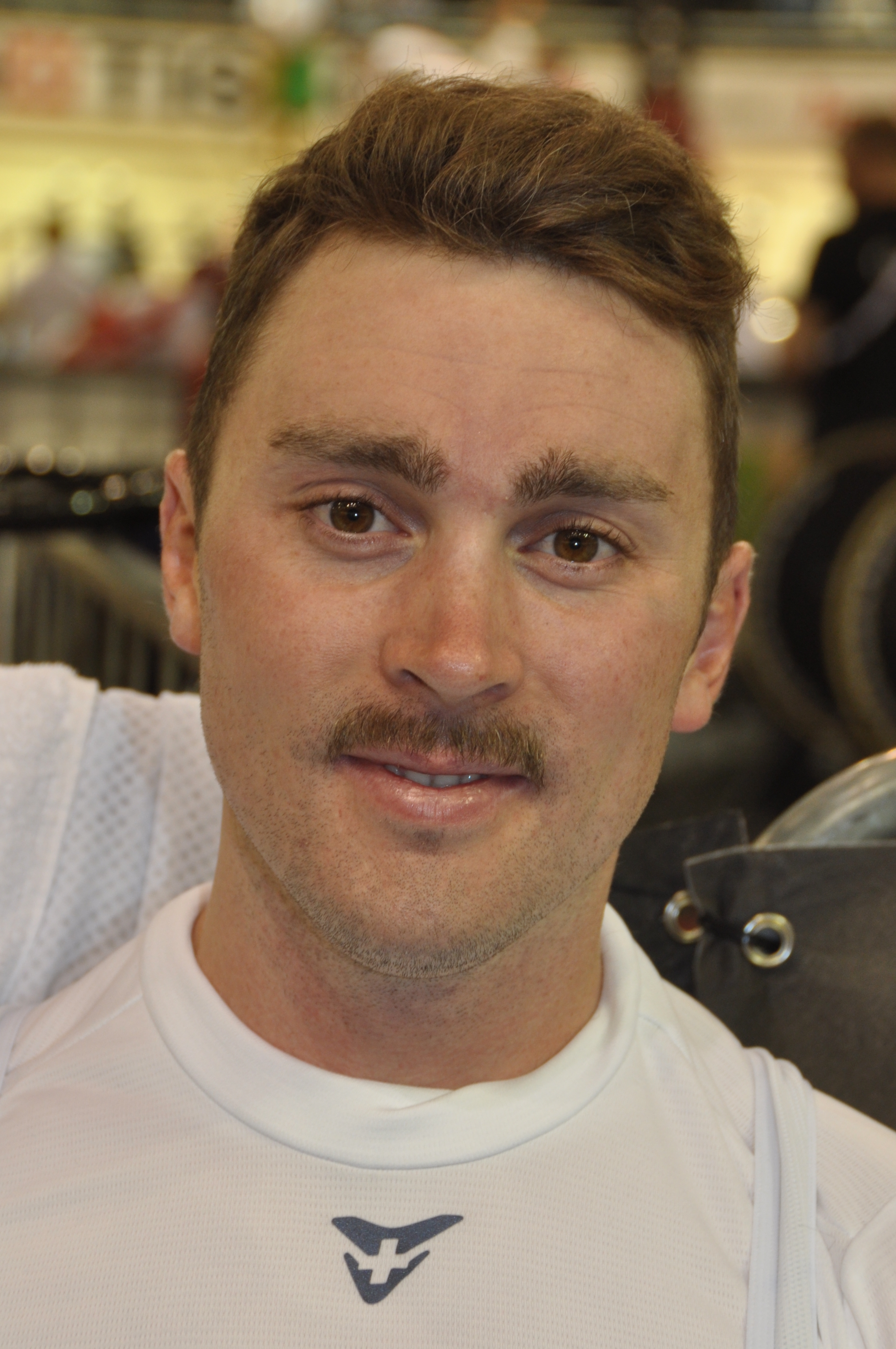
- Howard in 2018

Personal information
- Full name: Leigh Howard
- Born: 18 October 1989 (age 36) Geelong, Victoria, Australia
- Height: 1.76 m (5 ft 9 in)
- Weight: 70 kg (154 lb)

Cycling career
- Sport: Cycling
- Disciplines: Road; Track
- Role: Rider
- Rider type: Sprinter

Amateur teams
- Geelong CC
- 2009: Australian Institute of Sport
- 2009: Team Toshiba

Professional teams
- 2010–2011: Team HTC–Columbia
- 2012–2015: GreenEDGE
- 2016: IAM Cycling
- 2017: Aqua Blue Sport
- 2018–2019: ACA–Ride Sunshine Coast

Major wins
- Track Madison, World Championships (2010, 2011) Omnium, World Championships (2009) Team pursuit, World Championships (2019)
Medal record
Men's track cycling
Representing Australia
Olympic Games
Bronze medal – third place	2020 Tokyo	Team pursuit
World Championships
Gold medal – first place	2009 Pruszków	Omnium
Gold medal – first place	2010 Ballerup	Madison
Gold medal – first place	2011 Apeldoorn	Madison
Gold medal – first place	2019 Pruszków	Team pursuit
Silver medal – second place	2008 Manchester	Omnium
Silver medal – second place	2010 Ballerup	Omnium
Silver medal – second place	2009 Pruszków	Madison
Silver medal – second place	2009 Pruszków	Team pursuit
Bronze medal – third place	2012 Melbourne	Madison
Commonwealth Games
Gold medal – first place	2018 Gold Coast	Team pursuit

Leigh Howard (born 18 October 1989) is an Australian professional racing cyclist. He qualified for the Tokyo 2020 Olympics in both the Men's Madison and Men's Team Pursuit. Howard was part of the Men's team pursuit together with Kelland O'Brien, Sam Weisford and Alexander Porter. They secured a bronze medal after overlapping New Zealand who had crashed. Howard also competed in the Men's Madison where the team finished fifth with a time of 3:48.448 and therefore did not qualify for the final.

== Career ==
Born in Geelong, Victoria, Australia, Howard now resides in Waurn Ponds, Victoria. He began cycling competitively at the age of 10 and first represented Australia in 2005 at the age of 16. Howard is an Australian Institute of Sport scholarship holder, and initially trained as an automobile electrician.

Howard won the bronze medal in the omnium event at the 2008 UCI Track Cycling World Championships. He went on to take several medals in round 2 and 4 of the 2008–09 UCI Track Cycling World Cup Classics. In 2009, he again won a medal in the omnium at the World Championships, this time taking gold, he also took the silver medal in both the madison and team pursuit. Howard also had success on the road in 2009, winning stages 1 and 3 of the Tour of Japan.

Howard become a professional rider in 2010 with Team HTC–Columbia. In his first professional race with team HTC Columbia, Howard won the fourth stage of the Tour of Oman. Impressively, Howard finished ahead of Daniele Bennati, Tom Boonen and Tyler Farrar on the stage. After two years with the team, Howard moved to GreenEDGE for the 2012 season. In November 2015 IAM Cycling announced that Howard would join them for the 2016 season, with a role as part of the sprint train for Matteo Pelucchi.

Howard last rode for UCI Continental team Pro Racing Sunshine Coast.

== Major results ==
=== Road ===
2006
3rd Time trial, National Junior Championships
2007
Tour of Tasmania

1st Stages 1, 4 & 7

2008
1st Overall Tour of the Murray River

1st Stages 5 & 13

1st Coppa Colli Briantei Internazionale
Tour of Gippsland

1st Stages 6 & 8

Tour of Tasmania

1st Stages 1 & 8

1st Stage 2 Australian Cycling Grand Prix
10th Overall Tour de Berlin

1st Stage 2

2009
1st Overall Tour of Gippsland

1st Stages 2, 3, 6 & 9

1st Overall Okolo Slovenska
1st Classic Astico – Brenta
Tour of Japan

1st Points classification
1st Stages 1, 3 & 7

1st Stage 1 Thüringen Rundfahrt der U23
4th Circuito del Porto
8th Giro del Belvedere
2010 (2 pro wins)
1st Kampioenschap van Vlaanderen
1st Stage 4 Tour of Oman
1st Sprints classification, Bayern–Rundfahrt
2011 (1)
1st Stage 5 Ster Elektrotoer
3rd Trofeo Cala Millor
4th Grand Prix de Denain
2012 (1)
1st Stage 2 (TTT) Eneco Tour
3rd Overall Tour of Britain

1st Stage 2

2013 (2)
1st Trofeo Campos–Santanyí–Ses Salines
1st Trofeo Platja de Muro
8th Vuelta a La Rioja
2014
5th Gran Premio Nobili Rubinetterie
7th Overall Tour of Alberta
2015
6th RideLondon–Surrey Classic
2016 (2)
1st Clásica de Almería
1st Stage 1 Tour des Fjords
2nd Cadel Evans Great Ocean Road Race

==== Grand Tour general classification results timeline ====
Grand Tour	2011	2012	2013	2014	2015	2016
Giro d'Italia	—	—	DNF	—	—	DNF
Tour de France	—	—	—	—	—	172
Vuelta a España	152	—	142	—	—	—

Legend
—	Did not compete
DNF	Did not finish

=== Track ===
2006
1st Team pursuit, UCI World Junior Championships
National Junior Championships

1st Scratch
2nd Kilo
2nd Madison (with Alex Smyth)
2nd Team pursuit
3rd Individual pursuit

2007
UCI World Junior Championships

1st Team pursuit
2nd Madison (with Glenn O'Shea)
3rd Individual pursuit

National Junior Championships

1st Kilo
1st Omnium
1st Individual pursuit

UIV Cup

1st Amsterdam
1st Dortmund

3rd Madison, National Championships (with Travis Meyer)
2008
National Championships

1st Madison (with Glenn O'Shea)
1st Scratch
1st Team pursuit
2nd Individual pursuit

UIV Cup

1st Amsterdam
1st Munich

2nd Omnium, UCI World Championships
2nd Scratch, UCI World Cup Classics, Melbourne
2009
UCI World Championships

1st Omnium
2nd Madison (with Cameron Meyer)
2nd Team pursuit

UCI World Cup Classics, Beijing

1st Team pursuit
1st Madison (with Glenn O'Shea)

National Championships

2nd Team pursuit
3rd Individual pursuit

2010
UCI World Championships

1st Madison (with Cameron Meyer)
2nd Omnium

UCI World Cup Classics

1st Team pursuit, Beijing
1st Team pursuit, Melbourne
1st Madison, Melbourne (with Cameron Meyer)

2011
1st Madison, UCI World Championships (with Cameron Meyer)
1st Madison, Oceania Championships (with Cameron Meyer)
1st Madison, National Championships (with Glenn O'Shea)
2nd Six Days of Berlin (with Cameron Meyer)
2012
1st Six Days of Berlin (with Cameron Meyer)
2018
1st Team pursuit, Commonwealth Games
Oceania Championships

1st Team pursuit
2nd Omnium

National Championships

1st Team pursuit
2nd Madison (with Jordan Kerby)

UCI World Cup

1st Team pursuit, Berlin
2nd Scratch, Saint-Quentin-en-Yvelines
3rd Madison, Saint-Quentin-en-Yvelines (with Kelland O'Brien)

2nd Six Days of London (with Kelland O'Brien)
2019
1st Team pursuit, UCI World Championships
National Championships

1st Madison (with Glenn O'Shea)
1st Team pursuit

UCI World Cup

1st Team pursuit, Brisbane
2nd Team pursuit, Cambridge
3rd Madison, Glasgow (with Sam Welsford)

2nd Scratch, Oceania Championships
2020
3rd Madison, National Championships (with Sam Welsford)
2021
1st Madison, National Championships (with Glenn O'Shea)
3rd Team pursuit, Olympic Games

== See also ==
- Cycling in Geelong
