= Emiel Wastyn =

Belgian cyclist

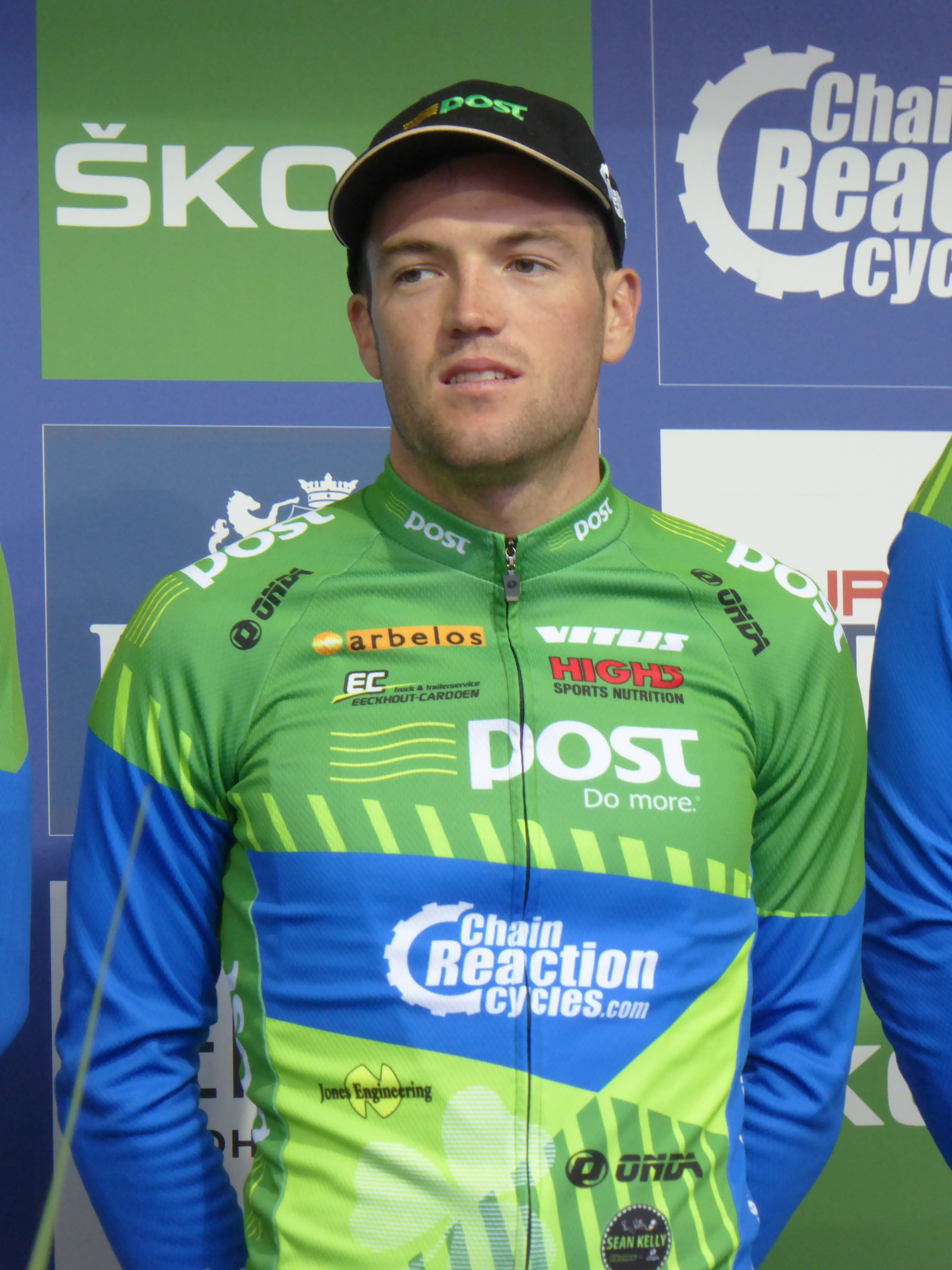
- Wastyn at the 2016 Tour of Britain

Personal information
- Full name: Emiel Wastyn
- Nickname: The Ant
- Born: 1 January 1992 (age 34) Menen, Flanders, Belgium
- Height: 1.71 m (5 ft 7 in)
- Weight: 63 kg (139 lb; 9 st 13 lb)

Cycling career
- Sport: Cycling
- Discipline: Road
- Role: Rider
- Rider type: Sprinter, Puncheur

Amateur team
- 2017: Meubelen Gaverzicht–Glascentr

Professional teams
- 2011–2013: Jong Vlaanderen–Bauknecht
- 2014–2015: Verandas Willems
- 2016: An Post–Chain Reaction

Emiel Wastyn (born 1 January 1992) is a Belgian former professional racing cyclist. His biggest victory was in 2015 where he managed to win Izegem Koerse, winning the sprint ahead of Michael Van Staeyen and Timothy Dupont.

== Personal life ==
Wastyn was born in Menen, Belgium, and now lives in Geluwe. Wastyn went to Ghent University, where he combined cycling with his studies for industrial engineering.

== Career ==
=== Youth ===
Wastyn started with sports at a young age. He soon focussed on cycling. In 2010 Wastyn rode as a junior in the World championship of cycling in service of Jasper Stuyven, who took the bronze medal. During the time at Ghent University, he rode for Jong Vlaanderen-Bauknecht. Until he went to Verandas Willems during his final year at university.

=== 2015 ===
After Wastyn obtained his master's degree in industrial engineering he could fully focus on cycling. In 2015 he rode his second year for Verandas Willems and managed to ride some nice results. His most important result was a victory in Izegem Koerse; he won the sprint and finished before Michael Van Staeyen and Timothy Dupont.

=== 2016 ===
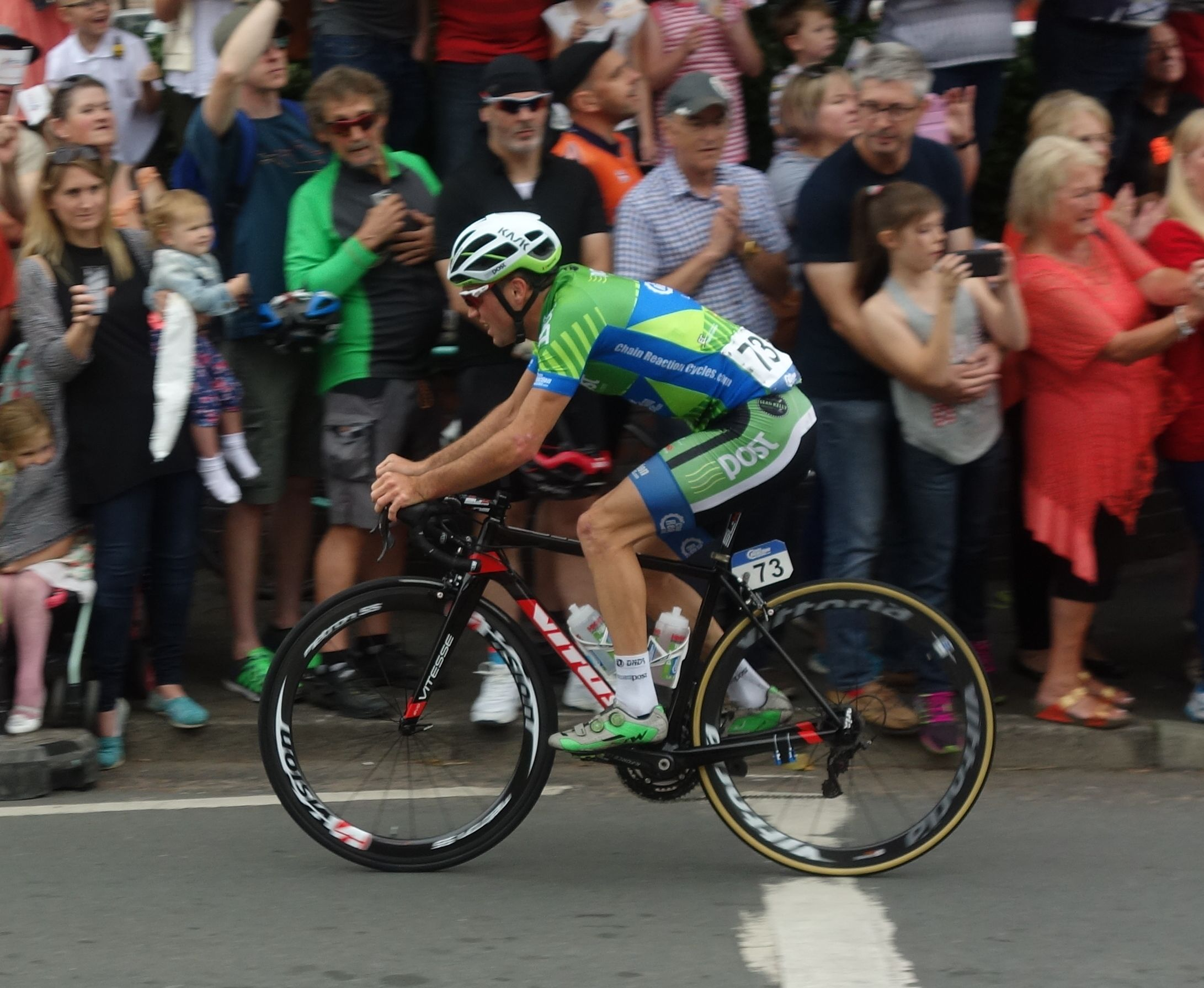
Wastyn at the 2016 Tour of Britain

After a promising year, where Wastyn showed to have the potential, he eventually signed for the Irish cycling team An Post–Chain Reaction. With his new team he showed to have a pair of fast legs. He is often used as a lead out for one of his fast teammates. But he also manages to ride some good results too. In GP Criquielion he finished 4th. In An Post Ras he finished 4 times in the top 10, got a fifth place for the Green jersey in the sprint. As a lead out in the sprint he helped his teammate Aaron Gate to a second consecutive green jersey.

== Major results ==
2009
7th Gent–Menen
2010
5th Overall Tour du Valromey
2014
2nd Mémorial Gilbert Letêcheur Rochefort
2015
1st Izegem Koers
3rd Omloop van de Grensstreek
2016
4th Grand Prix Criquielion
