= International Belgian Open =

Race details
- Date: September
- Region: Flanders, Belgium
- Discipline: Track
- Organiser: KBWB-RLVB

History
- Editions: 1 (as of 2013)

The International Belgian Open is an international track cycling meeting held at the Vlaams Wielercentrum Eddy Merckx in Ghent, Belgium. The first edition took place in 2013.

== Winners ==
Men

| Event | Winner |
6–7 September 2013
| Individual Pursuit | Jenning Huizenga (NED) |
| Scratch | Wim Stroetinga (NED) |
| Points Race | Kenny De Ketele (BEL) |
| Madison | Belgium (Jasper De Buyst - Kenny de Ketele) |
| Omnium | Jasper De Buyst (BEL) |

Women

| Event | Winner |
6–7 September 2013
| Individual Pursuit | Joanna Rowsell (GBR) |
| Scratch | Leire Olaberria (ESP) |
| Points Race | Katie Archibald (GBR) |
| Omnium | Leire Olaberria (ESP) |
