= Jasper De Buyst =

Belgian racing cyclist

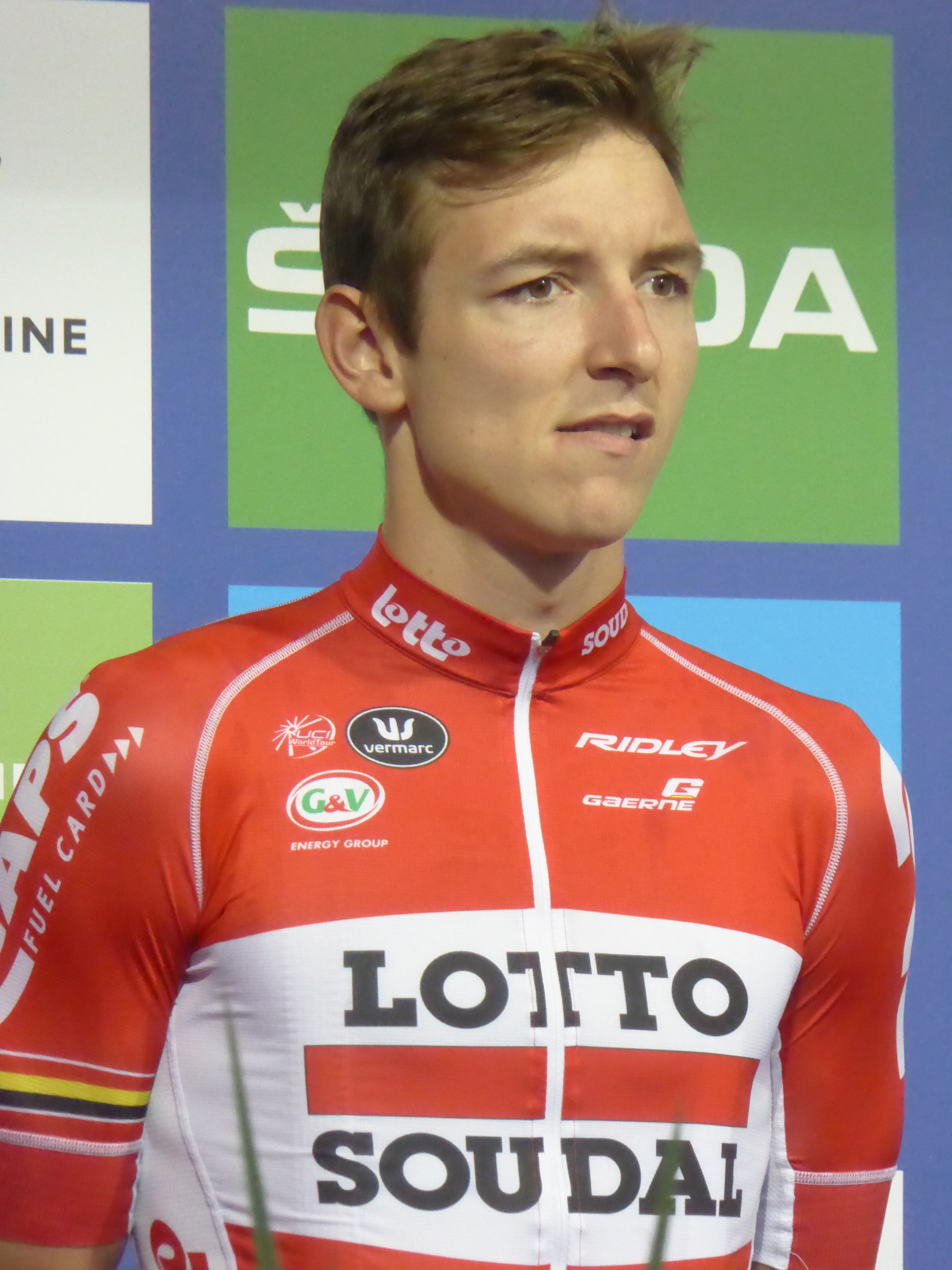
- De Buyst at the 2016 Tour of Britain

Personal information
- Full name: Jasper De Buyst
- Born: November 24, 1993 (age 32) Asse, Belgium
- Height: 1.78 m (5 ft 10 in)
- Weight: 68 kg (150 lb; 10 st 10 lb)

Cycling career
- Sport: Cycling
- Current team: Lotto–Intermarché
- Disciplines: Track; Road
- Role: Rider

Amateur team
- 2010–2011: AVIA Cycling Team

Professional teams
- 2012: Bontrager–Livestrong
- 2013–2014: Topsport Vlaanderen–Baloise
- 2015–: Lotto–Soudal
Medal record
Representing Belgium
Men's track cycling
World Championships
| Bronze medal – third place | 2015 Yvelines | Madison |
European Championships
| Bronze medal – third place | 2025 Heusden-Zolder | Points race |
| Bronze medal – third place | 2026 Konya | Points race |
| Bronze medal – third place | 2026 Konya | Madison |

Jasper De Buyst (born 24 November 1993) is a Belgian professional racing cyclist, who currently rides for UCI WorldTeam Lotto–Intermarché. De Buyst focuses mainly on track cycling, notably the omnium, points race, madison and six-day racing disciplines.

He is the son of professional cyclist Franky De Buyst and became professional himself in 2013, at the age of 19. He was named in the start list for the 2015 Vuelta a España and the start list for the 2017 Giro d'Italia. In July 2018, he was named in the start list for the 2018 Tour de France.

== Major results ==
=== Road ===
2010
1st Road race, National Junior Championships
2011
1st Time trial, National Junior Championships
2013
10th Overall Rás Tailteann
2014
2nd Druivenkoers Overijse
5th Grote Prijs Stad Zottegem
8th Grand Prix Impanis-Van Petegem
2015
6th Overall Tour de Picardie
2016
8th Nationale Sluitingsprijs
2017 (4 pro wins)
1st Binche–Chimay–Binche
1st Grote Prijs Stad Zottegem
1st Heistse Pijl
1st Stage 2 Tour de Wallonie
3rd Ronde van Drenthe
3rd Kampioenschap van Vlaanderen
4th Tour de l'Eurométropole
4th Dwars door West-Vlaanderen
4th Rund um Köln
6th Brussels Cycling Classic
7th Overall Ster ZLM Toer
10th Overall Three Days of De Panne
2018
2nd Omloop van het Houtland
3rd Trofeo Campos, Porreres, Felanitx, Ses Salines
2019 (1)
3rd Overall Tour of Britain
3rd Grand Prix de Wallonie
3rd Primus Classic
4th Overall ZLM Tour
5th Road race, National Championships
5th Overall Danmark Rundt

1st Points classification
1st Stage 4

9th Kuurne–Brussels–Kuurne
9th London–Surrey Classic
2020
7th Overall Tour de Wallonie
2021
10th Overall Tour of Belgium
2022
3rd Egmont Cycling Race
4th Circuit Franco-Belge
4th Tour of Leuven
8th Druivenkoers Overijse
9th Grand Prix de Wallonie
2023 (1)
1st Egmont Cycling Race
3rd Grand Prix de Wallonie
3rd Druivenkoers Overijse
3rd Rund um Köln
5th Road race, National Championships
5th Bretagne Classic
6th Overall Tour of Belgium
2024
8th Gran Premio Castellón

==== Grand Tour general classification results timeline ====
| Grand Tour | 2015 | 2016 | 2017 | 2018 | 2019 | 2020 | 2021 | 2022 | 2023 | 2024 | 2025 |
|---|---|---|---|---|---|---|---|---|---|---|---|
| Giro d'Italia | — | — | DNF | — | DNF | — | DNF | — | — | — | — |
| Tour de France | — | — | — | 142 | 118 | 142 | DNF | — | 136 | — | DNF |
| Vuelta a España | 126 | — | — | — | — | — | — | — | — | — | 140 |

Legend
| — | Did not compete |
| DNF | Did not finish |

=== Track ===
2011
2nd Omnium, UEC European Junior Championships
2012
UEC European Under-23 Championships

2nd Madison (with Gijs Van Hoecke)
3rd Team pursuit

3rd Team pursuit, UCI World Cup, Glasgow
2013
UCI World Cup

1st Omnium, Manchester
2nd Madison, Aguascalientes (with Kenny De Ketele)
2nd Omnium, Aguascalientes

1st Omnium, UEC European Under-23 Championships
National Championships

1st Madison (with Iljo Keisse)
1st Points race

International Belgian Open

1st Madison (with Kenny De Ketele)
1st Omnium

3 Jours d'Aigle

1st Madison (with Kenny De Ketele)
1st Omnium

1st Six Days of Ghent (with Leif Lampater)
2nd Six Days of Zürich (with Kenny De Ketele)
2014
UCI World Cup

1st Overall, Madison (with Kenny De Ketele)
1st Overall, Omnium
2nd Madison, Guadalajara (with Kenny De Ketele)
2nd Omnium, Guadalajara

1st Six Days of Ghent (with Kenny De Ketele)
UEC European Under-23 Championships

2nd Madison (with Otto Vergaerde)
3rd Points race

2nd Six Days of Berlin (with Leif Lampater)
2nd Six Days of Rotterdam (with Kenny De Ketele)
3rd Six Days of Zürich (with Kenny De Ketele)
2015
2nd Omnium, UCI World Cup, Cali
3rd Madison, UCI World Championships (with Otto Vergaerde)
3rd Six Days of Ghent (with Otto Vergaerde)
2018
3rd Six Days of Ghent (with Tosh Van der Sande)
2019
1st Six Days of Bremen (with Iljo Keisse)
2nd Six Days of Ghent (with Tosh Van der Sande)
2021
2nd Six Days of Ghent (with Roger Kluge)
2025
3rd Points race, UEC European Championships
3rd Six Days of Ghent (with Elia Viviani)
2026
UEC European Championships

3rd Points race
3rd Madison (with Jules Hesters)
