= Six Days of Amsterdam =

- Logo for the 2012 edition

Race details
- Date: October
- Region: Amsterdam, the Netherlands
- Local name(s): Zesdaagse van Amsterdam (in Dutch)
- Discipline: Track
- Type: Six-day racing
- Web site: www.zesdaagseamsterdam.nl

History
- First edition: 1932
- Editions: 23 (as of 2016)
- First winner: Jan Pijnenburg (NED); Piet van Kempen (NED)
- Most wins: Danny Stam (NED) (4 wins)
- Most recent: Kenny De Ketele (BEL); Moreno De Pauw (BEL)

The Six Days of Amsterdam (Dutch: Zesdaagse van Amsterdam) is a six-day track cycling race held at the Amsterdam Velodrome in Amsterdam, the Netherlands.

The recordholder for the Six Days of Amsterdam is the Dutch cyclist Danny Stam with four victories.

The most recent edition took place in 2016 and was won by Belgians Kenny De Ketele and Moreno De Pauw, their third Six Day victory as a duo.

== History ==
The first edition was between 18 and 24 November 1932, in the old building of the Amsterdam RAI on the Ferdinand Bolstraat on a 166.6 metre track. This first edition was won by the Dutch couple Jan Pijnenburg and Piet van Kempen. The year afterwards the Dutch couple Jan Pijnenburg/Cor Wals beat the French couple Marcel Guimbretiere/Paul Broccado and the year later during the third edition it was the other way around and the French couple won. After Adolphe Charlier and Frans Slaats won the fourth edition in 1936 there were no more Six Days held in Amsterdam for thirty years. Due to the large unemployment and later also due to the Second World War, the National Cycling Union (NWU) prohibited to organise Six Day races. There were many proposals to organise a Six Day race after the Second World War but the fifth edition was years later in 1966, in the new RAI building located on the Europaplein. After four editions in this building there were again about thirty years without the event organised in Amsterdam. Since 2001 the race takes place in the new build Amsterdam Velodrome located in Sportpark Sloten, with a 200-metre track and a capacity for 2000 spectators. World Champion Ellen van Dijk fired the starting shot for the 21st edition in October 2013.

== List of winning teams of the Six Days of Amsterdam ==
1969 report by Polygoon

Year	Team	
2016	Kenny De Ketele (BEL)	Moreno De Pauw (BEL)
2014	Niki Terpstra (NED)	Yoeri Havik (NED)
2013	Kenny De Ketele (BEL)	Gijs Van Hoecke (BEL)
2012	Pim Ligthart (NED)	Michael Mørkøv (DEN)
2011	Iljo Keisse (BEL)	Niki Terpstra (NED)
2010	Robert Bartko (GER)	Roger Kluge (GER)
2009	Robert Bartko (GER)	Roger Kluge (GER)
2008	Robert Slippens (NED)	Danny Stam (NED)
2007	Iljo Keisse (BEL)	Robert Bartko (GER)
2006	Peter Schep (NED)	Danny Stam (NED)
2005	Bruno Risi (SUI)	Kurt Betschart (SUI)
2004	Robert Slippens (NED)	Danny Stam (NED)
2003	Robert Slippens (NED)	Danny Stam (NED)
2002	Silvio Martinello (ITA)	Marco Villa (ITA)
2001	Scott McGrory (AUS)	Matthew Gilmore (BEL)
1969	Peter Post (NED)	Romain Deloof (BEL)
1968	Klaus Bugdahl (GER)	Jan Janssen (NED)
1967	Freddy Eugen (DEN)	Palle Lykke (DEN)
1966	Peter Post (NED)	Fritz Pfenninger (SUI)
1936	Adolphe Charlier (FRA)	Frans Slaats (NED)
1934	Marcel Guimbretiere (FRA)	Paul Broccado (FRA)
1933	Jan Pijnenburg (NED)	Cor Wals (NED)
1932	Jan Pijnenburg (NED)	Piet van Kempen (NED)

== See also ==
- Six Days of Ghent
- Six Days of Grenoble
- Six Days of New York
