= 2015 Six Days of London =

Six Day London 2015
Race details
- Dates: 18–23 October

Results
	Winner	Kenny De Ketele and Moreno De Pauw (BEL)
	Second	Chris Latham and Ollie Wood (GBR)

2015 Six Days of London was a professional track cycling event held at the Lee Valley VeloPark in October 2015. The event was held over six consecutive nights (Sunday 18th to Friday 23rd). The event was held in the same Velodrome as used during the 2012 Olympic and Paralympic Games. It followed the typical six-day racing format, involving teams of two male riders competing in a number of races each evening. The primary event in the six day competition is the madison, occurring twice per night, in which teams attempted to lap the field. The overall number of laps determined the winner of the completion, with ties being decided based on points earned in minor races, including the derny, team elimination and time trials. In addition to the main competition, the event featured sprint races, an elite women's omnium held over three nights, as well as junior racing. The first day didn't count towards the main competition, due to a clash with the European Track Championships in Grenchen which meant not all riders could be present. Instead, a stand-alone single day solo competition was held under the title of the "1878 Cup", which was won by Mark Stewart.

Six Day London marked the return of the sport of six-day racing to London for the first time in 35 years. The last event was held in Wembley Arena in 1980.

== Results ==
Belgians Kenny De Ketele and Moreno De Pauw were overall winners, with Chris Latham and Ollie Wood of Great Britain in second place. In the Under 23 Talent Cup Angus Claxton and Tristan Robbins were the overall winners. Małgorzata Wojtyra won the women's event.
