= Otto Vergaerde =

Belgian cyclist

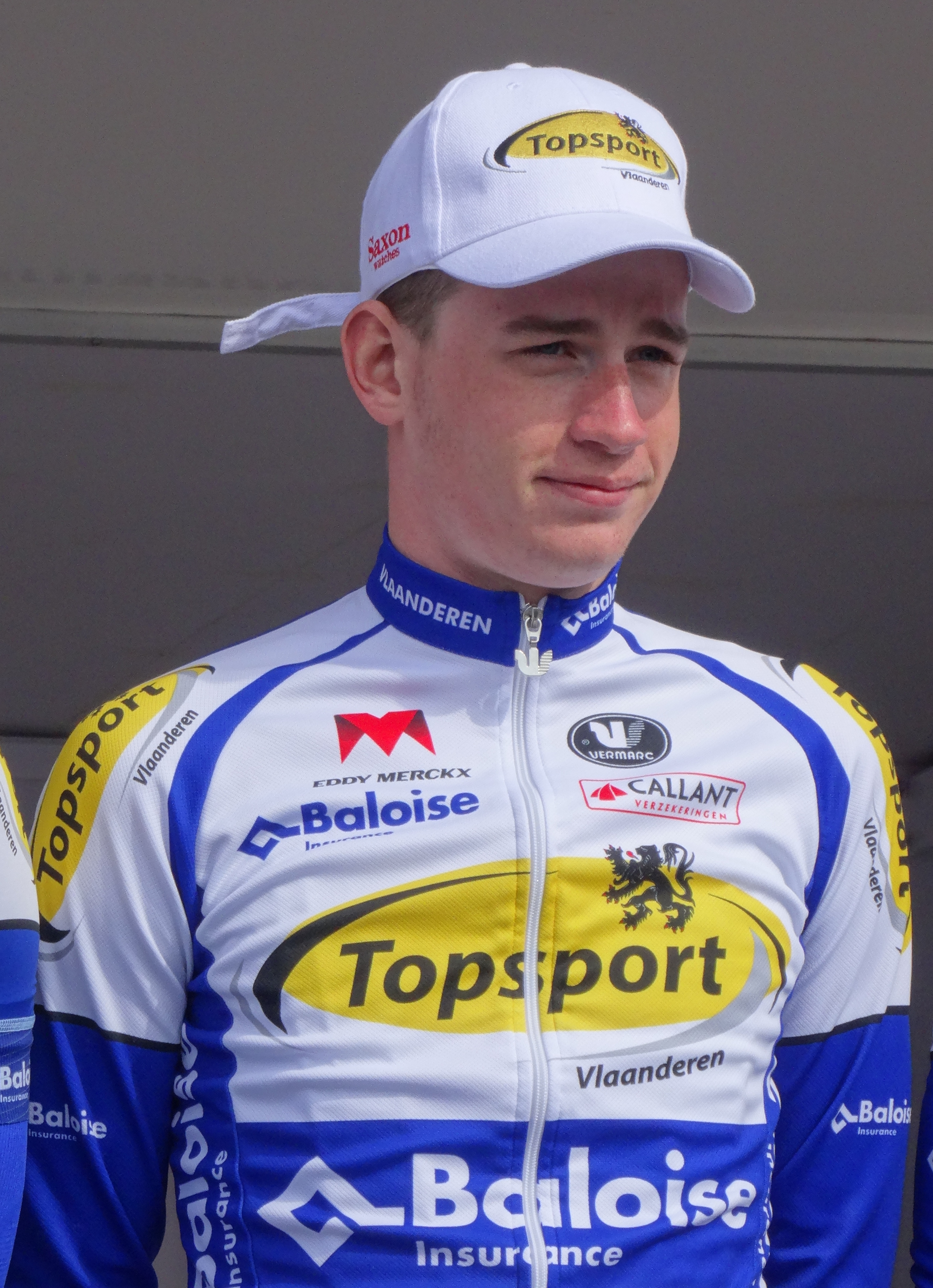
- Vergaerde in 2014.

Personal information
- Full name: Otto Vergaerde
- Born: 15 July 1994 (age 32) Ghent, Belgium
- Height: 180 cm (5 ft 11 in)
- Weight: 74 kg (163 lb)

Cycling career
- Sport: Cycling
- Current team: Lidl–Trek
- Disciplines: Road; Track
- Role: Rider

Amateur teams
- 2010: Balen BC
- 2011–2012: Cube–Fintro
- 2013: Ovyta–Eijssen–Acrog

Professional teams
- 2014–2016: Topsport Vlaanderen–Baloise
- 2017: Vérandas Willems–Crelan
- 2018: WSA–Pushbikers
- 2019–2021: Corendon–Circus
- 2022–: Trek–Segafredo
Medal record
World Championships
Bronze medal – third place	2015 Yvelines	Madison
European Elite Championships
Gold medal – first place	2014 Guadeloupe	Scratch
Silver medal – second place	2014 Guadeloupe	Madison

Otto Vergaerde (born 15 July 1994) is a Belgian cyclist, who currently rides for UCI WorldTeam Lidl–Trek.

== Major results ==
=== Track ===
2011
3rd Madison, UEC European Junior Championships (with Jonas Rickaert)
2012
2nd Madison, UCI Juniors World Championships (with Jonas Rickaert)
2014
UEC European Championships

1st Scratch
2nd Madison (with Kenny De Ketele)

2nd Madison, UEC European Under-23 Championships (with Jasper De Buyst)
2015
3rd Madison, UCI World Championships (with Jasper De Buyst)

=== Road ===
2013
1st Mémorial Pierre Harinck
1st Mémorial Anita Lambert
2019
6th Grote Prijs Stad Zottegem
9th Memorial Rik Van Steenbergen
10th Elfstedenronde
2020
10th Overall Czech Cycling Tour

=== Grand Tour general classification results timeline ===
Grand Tour	2022	2023
Giro d'Italia	119	98
Tour de France	—	—
Vuelta a España	—	113

Legend
—	Did not compete
DNF	Did not finish
