= Cyrille Thièry =

Swiss cyclist

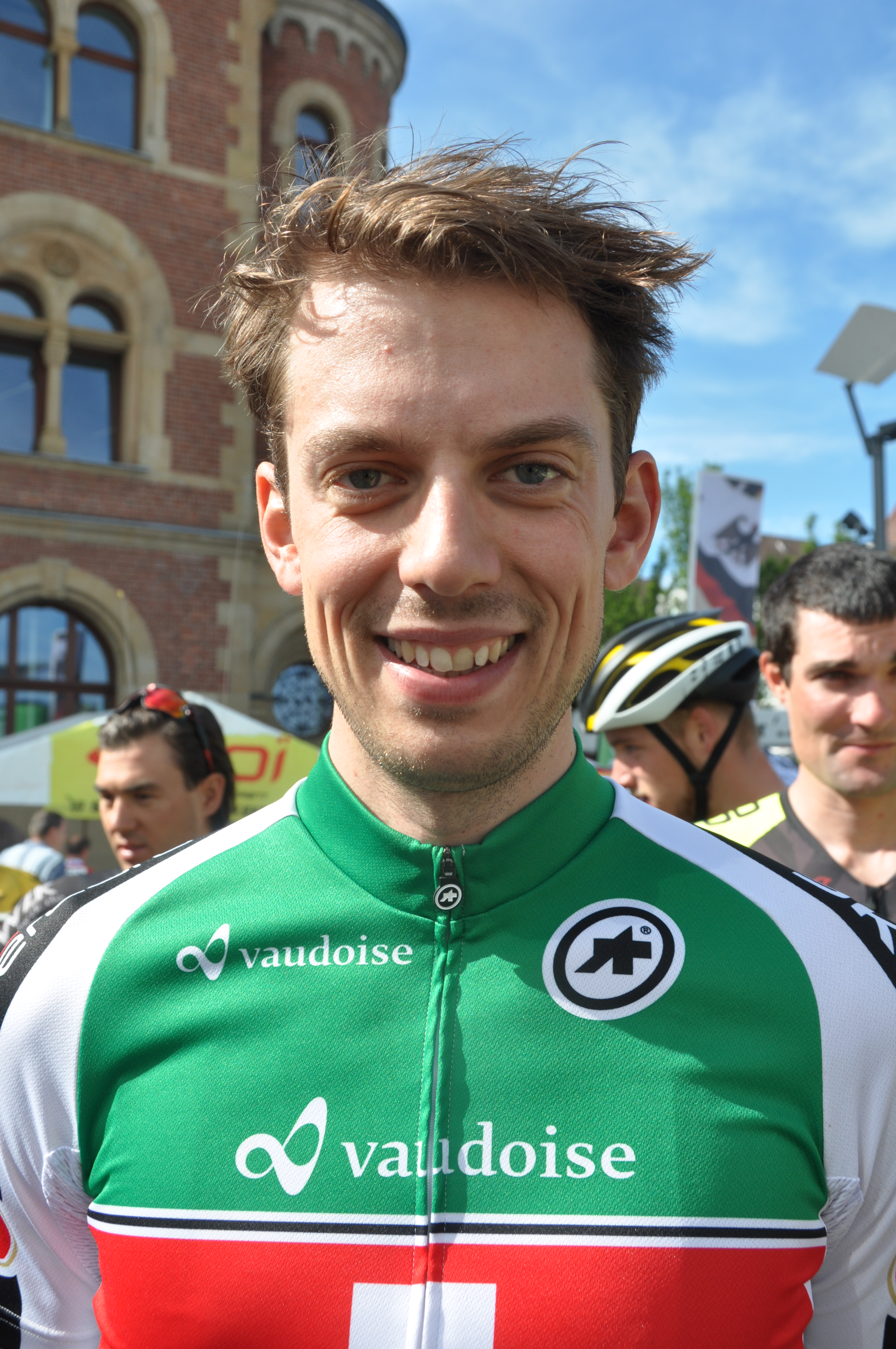
- Thièry in 2017

Personal information
- Full name: Cyrille Thièry
- Born: 27 September 1990 (age 36) Lausanne, Switzerland
- Height: 1.79 m (5 ft 10 in)
- Weight: 67 kg (148 lb)

Cycling career
- Sport: Cycling
- Current team: Tudor Pro Cycling Team
- Disciplines: Road; Track
- Role: Rider

Amateur teams
- 2011: VC Orbe
- 2012–2013: Charvieu-Chavagneux Isère Cyclisme
- 2014–2017: VC Mendrisio–PL Valli
- 2018: IAM–Excelsior

Professional team
- 2019–: Swiss Racing Academy
Medal record
European Championships
Silver medal – second place	2011 Apeldoorn	Madison
Silver medal – second place	2018 Glasgow	Team pursuit

Cyrille Thièry (born 27 September 1990) is a Swiss professional racing cyclist, who currently rides for UCI Continental team Tudor Pro Cycling Team. He rode at the 2015 UCI Track Cycling World Championships.

== Major results ==
=== Road ===
2008
1st Overall Grand Prix Rüebliland

1st Mountains classification
1st Points classification
1st Stages 1 & 4

2nd Trofeo Emilio Paganessi
4th Overall Tour du Pays de Vaud
4th Overall Driedaagse van Axel
2016
3rd Overall International Tour of Rhodes
5th Overall Tour de Hokkaido
2018
2nd Overall Rás Tailteann

1st Stage 1

7th Flèche Ardennaise
2019
8th Overall New Zealand Cycle Classic

1st Mountains classification

10th Grote Prijs Stad Zottegem
2021
4th Road race, National Road Championships

=== Track ===
2008
2nd Team pursuit, National Track Championships
2009
National Track Championships

2nd Team pursuit
3rd Points race

2010
3rd Team pursuit, National Track Championships
2011
National Track Championships

1st Team pursuit
2nd Madison
3rd Points race
3rd Scratch

UEC European Under-23 Championships

1st Madison (with Silvan Dillier)
3rd Team pursuit

2nd Madison, UEC European Championships
3rd Madison, UCI World Cup, Cali
2012
National Track Championships

1st Madison (with Théry Schir)
2nd Team pursuit
3rd Scratch
3rd Team sprint

2nd Team pursuit, UEC European Under-23 Championships
2013
2nd Madison, National Track Championships
2014
National Track Championships

1st Team pursuit
2nd Madison
3rd Points race

2nd Team pursuit, 2013–14 UCI Track Cycling World Cup, Guadalajara
2015
2nd Omnium, National Track Championships
2016
National Track Championships

2nd Individual pursuit
3rd Madison
3rd Points race

2017
National Track Championships

1st Individual pursuit
2nd Madison
3rd Points race

2018
2nd Team pursuit, UEC European Championships
3rd Team pursuit, 2018–19 UCI Track Cycling World Cup, Cambridge
3rd Omnium, National Track Championships
2019
National Track Championships

1st Individual pursuit
3rd Madison

3rd Team pursuit, 2019–20 UCI Track Cycling World Cup, Hong Kong
