= Moreno De Pauw =

Belgian cyclist (born 1991)

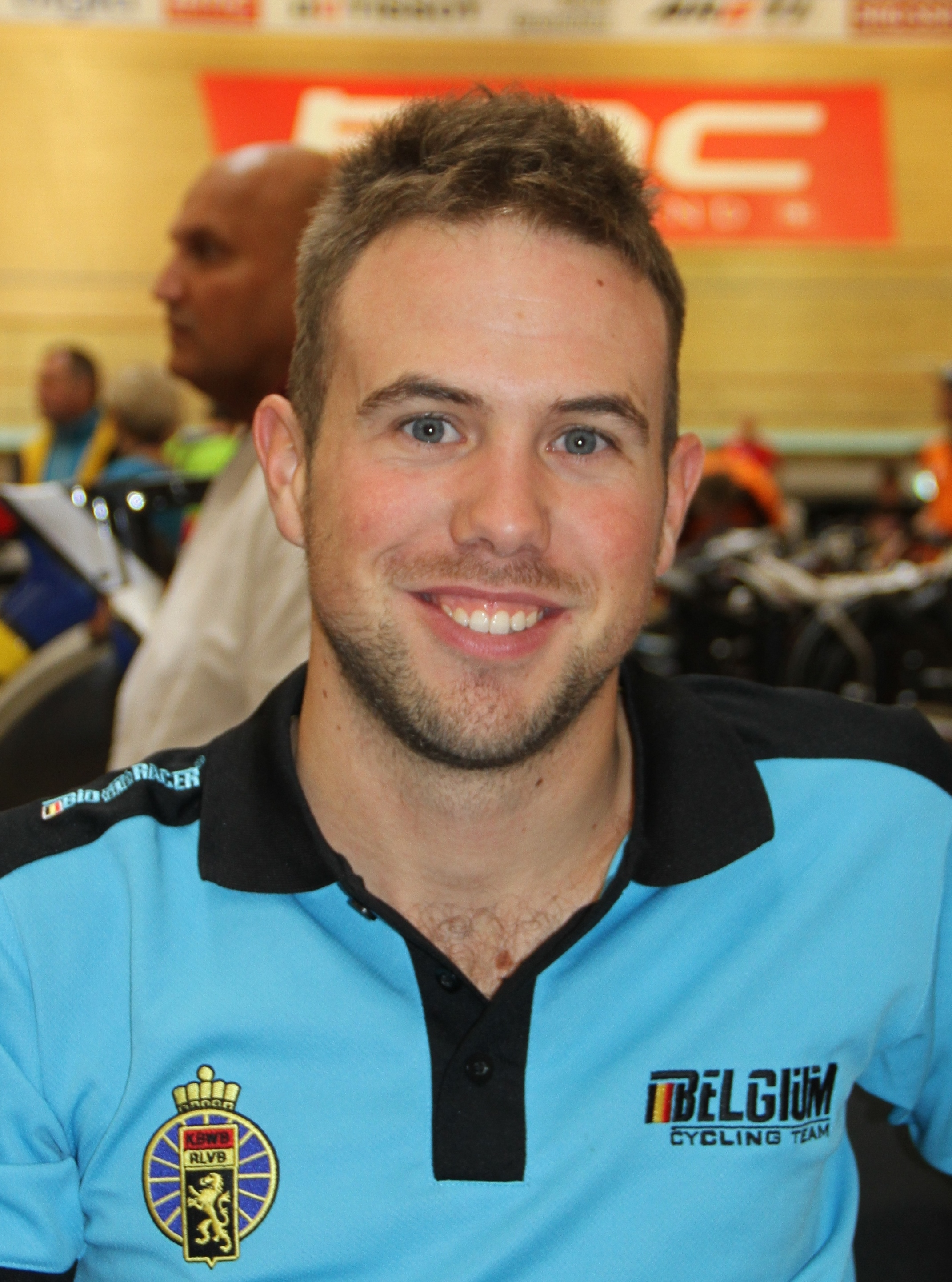
- De Paus at the 2015 UEC European Track Championships

Personal information
- Full name: Moreno De Pauw
- Born: 12 August 1991 (age 35) Sint-Niklaas, Belgium

Cycling career
- Sport: Cycling
- Current team: Retired
- Disciplines: Road; Track
- Role: Rider

Amateur teams
- 2009: Avia
- 2010–2013: Rock Werchter–Chocolade Jacques

Professional team
- 2014–2019: Topsport Vlaanderen–Baloise
Medal record
World Championships
| Bronze medal – third place | 2017 Hong Kong | Madison |
European Championships
| Bronze medal – third place | 2016 Yvelines | Madison |

Moreno De Pauw (born 12 August 1991) is a Belgian former cyclist, who rode professionally for Sport Vlaanderen–Baloise between 2014 and 2019.

== Major results ==
2013
1st Stage 5 Rás Tailteann
2014
2nd Six Days of Grenoble (with Otto Vergaerde)
2015
1st Six Days of London (with Kenny De Ketele)
2016
National Track Championships

1st Points race
1st Madison race (with Kenny De Ketele)
2nd Scratch Race

1st Six Days of London (with Kenny De Ketele)
1st Six Days of Amsterdam (with Kenny De Ketele)
2nd Six Days of Ghent (with Kenny De Ketele)
2nd Six Days of Copenhagen (with Kenny De Ketele)
3rd Madison (with Kenny De Ketele), UEC European Track Championships
3rd Madison, Glasgow (with Kenny De Ketele), UCI Track World Cup
2017
1st Omnium, National Track Championships
1st Six Days of Ghent (with Kenny De Ketele)
1st Six Days of Berlin (with Kenny De Ketele)
1st Six Day Final Mallorca (with Kenny De Ketele)
2nd Six Days of Copenhagen (with Kenny De Ketele)
3rd Madison (with Kenny De Ketele), UCI Track World Championships
3rd Six Days of London (with Kenny De Ketele)
2018
2nd Six Days of Berlin (with Kenny De Ketele)
2nd Six Days of Copenhagen (with Yoeri Havik)
