= Ventilair–Steria =

Ventilair- Cycling Team
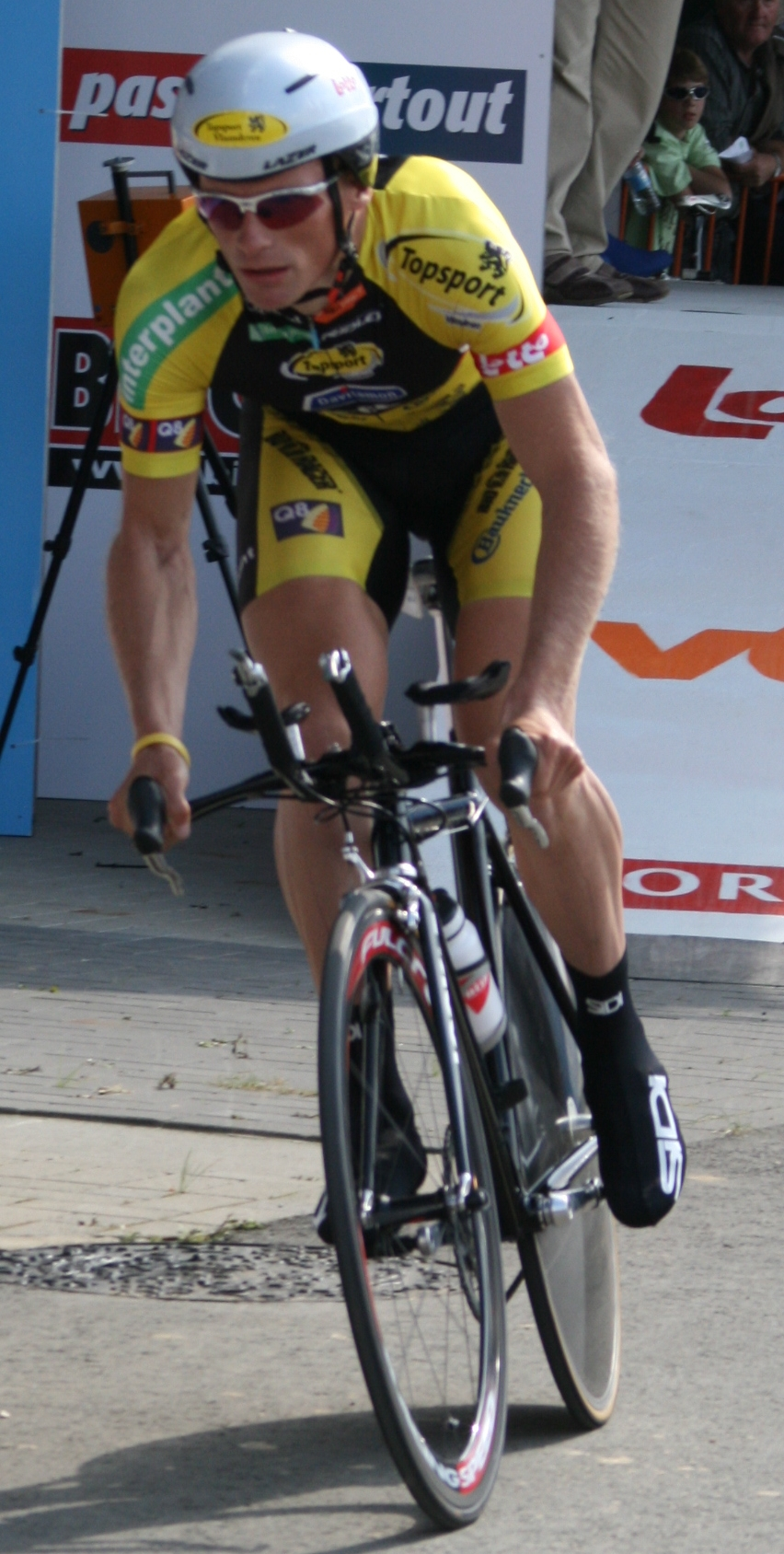

Team information
- UCI code: JVC
- Registered: Belgium
- Founded: 2005
- Disbanded: 2013
- Discipline: Road
- Status: Continental

Key personnel
- Team manager: Andy Missotten

Team name history
- 2005–06 2007 2008 2009–2011 Jan 2012-June 2012 July 2012-Dec 2012 2013: Bodysol-Win for Life-Jong Vlaanderen; Davitamon–Win for Life–Jong Vlaanderen; Davitamon–Lotto–Jong Vlaanderen; Jong Vlaanderen–Bauknecht; Jong Vlaanderen Cycling Team; Bofrost- Ventilair- Cycling Team
Ventilair–Steria jersey
Jersey

Ventilair– Cycling Team (UCI team code: JVC) was a Continental cycling team founded in 2005. It was based in Belgium and it participated in UCI Continental Circuits races. The team consisted mostly of young Flemish cyclists.

The team disbanded at the end of the 2013 season.

== Major wins ==
2005
Overall Tour de Berlin, Dominique Cornu

Stage 3, Dominique Cornu
Stage 4, Steve Schets

Stage 6 Volta a Lleida, Sjef De Wilde
Flèche Ardennaise, Francis De Greef
2006
Stage 2 Tour de Normandie, Jürgen Roelandts
GP Waregem, Jelle Vanendert
Stage 2 Tour du Loir-et-Cher, Jürgen Roelandts
Stage 2 Ronde de l'Isard, Jelle Vanendert
Stage 4 Ronde de l'Isard, Dominique Cornu
Stage 1 Tour de Berlin, Steve Schets
I.W.T. Jong Maar Moedig, Greg Van Avermaet
2007
Stage 4 Tour de Normandie, Kristof De Zutter
Stage 3 Triptyque des Monts et Châteaux, Maarten Neyens
Overall Volta a Lleida, Francis De Greef

Stage 2, Sven Vandousselaere
Stage 3, Francis De Greef
Stage 5a, Team Time Trial

Paris–Tours Espoirs, Jürgen Roelandts
2008
GP de Pérenchies, Steven De Neef
2009
Stage 4 Tour du Loir-et-Cher, Sven Vandousselaere
Stage 1 Tour du Haut Anjou, Sep Vanmarcke
2010
Stage 5 Tour de Normandie, Sven Vandousselaere
GP Stad Geel, Timothy Dupont
2012
Stage 4 Ronde de l'Isard, Niels Vandyck
2013
Stage 2 Tour du Loir-et-Cher, Jeroen Lepla

== 2013 squad ==
As of 17 January 2013.

Rider	Date of birth
Joeri Calleeuw (BEL)	5 August 1985 (age 41)
Michael Cools (BEL)	12 September 1994 (age 31)
Timothy Dupont (BEL)	1 November 1987 (age 38)
Joaquim Durant (BEL)	29 January 1991 (age 35)
Jeroen Lepla (BEL)	13 August 1990 (age 36)
Jeff Luyten (BEL)	9 October 1992 (age 33)
Daniel Peeters (BEL)	19 August 1993 (age 33)
Ruben Pols (BEL)	3 November 1994 (age 31)
Rutger Roelants (BEL)	29 December 1992 (age 33)

Rider	Date of birth
Brecht Ruyters (BEL)	14 May 1993 (age 33)
Dylan Teuns (BEL)	1 March 1992 (age 34)
Francesco Van Coppernolle (BEL)	16 April 1991 (age 35)
Kevin Van Hoovels (BEL)	31 July 1985 (age 41)
Bert Van Lerberghe (BEL)	29 September 1992 (age 33)
Tim Van Speybroeck (BEL)	8 March 1991 (age 35)
Frederik Vandewiele (BEL)	11 February 1991 (age 35)
Evert Vandromme (BEL)	20 January 1993 (age 33)
Emiel Wastyn (BEL)	1 January 1992 (age 34)
