= Christian Ranneries =

Danish cyclist

Personal information
- Born: 5 May 1988 (age 38) Næstved, Denmark

Cycling career
- Sport: Cycling
- Disciplines: Track; Road
- Role: Rider; Directeur sportif

Professional teams
- 2009–2010: Energi Fyn
- 2011–2012: Concordia Forsikring–Himmerland

Managerial team
- 2014–2018: Riwal Cycling Team

Christian Ranneries (born 5 May 1988) is a Danish former road and track cyclist. He competed in the team pursuit event at the 2011 and 2012 UCI Track Cycling World Championships. He also worked as a directeur sportif for Riwal Cycling Team from 2014 until 2018.
