= Mikhail Radionov =

Track cyclist from Ukraine

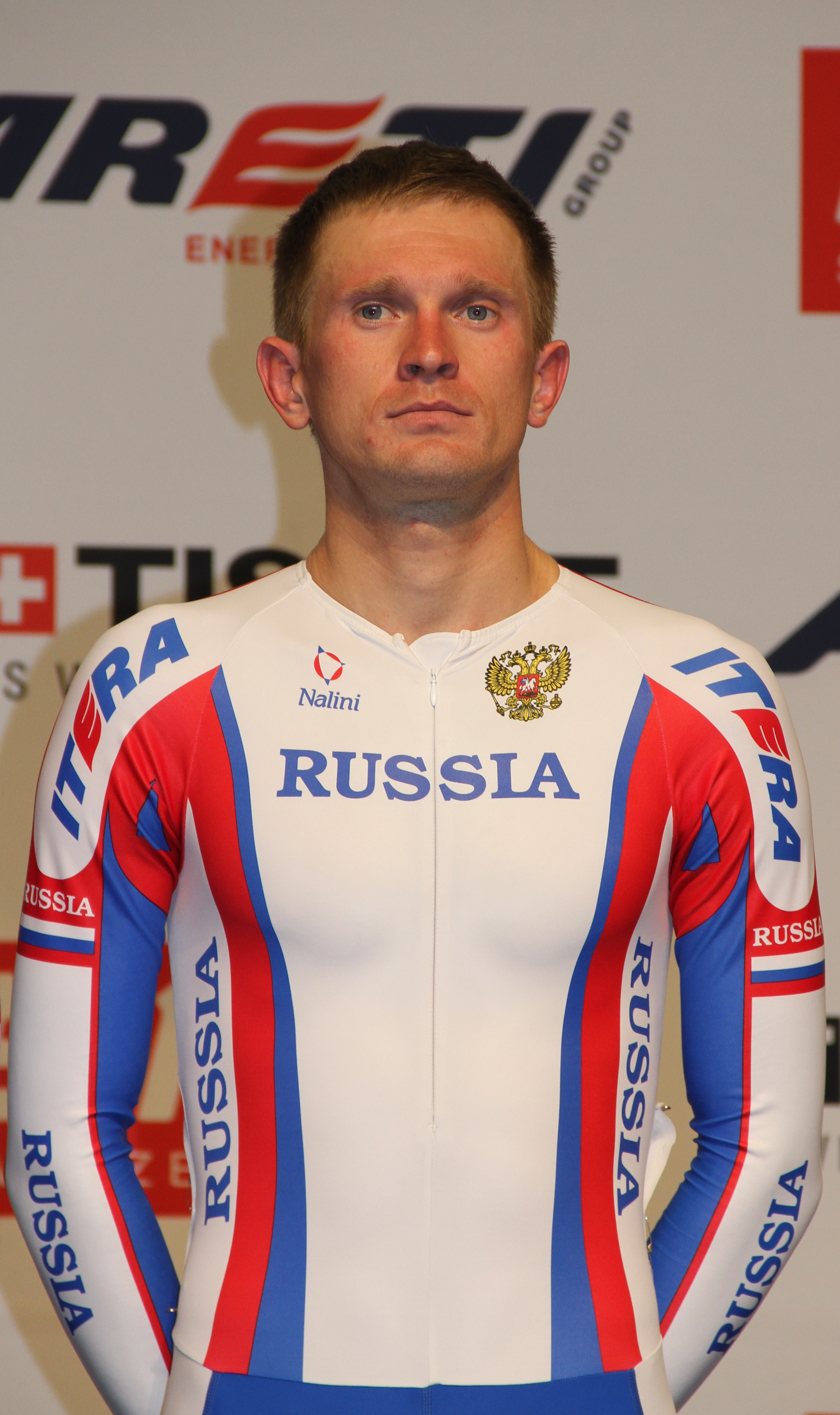
- Radionov at the 2015 UEC European Track Championships

Personal information
- Born: 9 September 1984 (age 42) Simferopol

Cycling career
- Sport: Cycling
- Discipline: Track cycling
Medal record
Representing Ukraine, Russia
European Track Championships
Silver medal – second place	2015 Grenchen	Madison
Bronze medal – third place	2010 Pruszków	Madison

Mikhail Radionov (born 9 September 1984) is a track cyclist from Simferopol in Ukraine. He became Russian in 2013. In 2010 he won the bronze medal in the madison at the 2010 UEC European Track Championships in Pruszków, Poland. He competed at the 2010, 2011 and 2013 UCI Track Cycling World Championships. In 2015, he won the silver medal in the madison at the 2015 UEC European Track Championships in Grenchen, Switzerland.
