= Tim Mertens =

Belgian cyclist

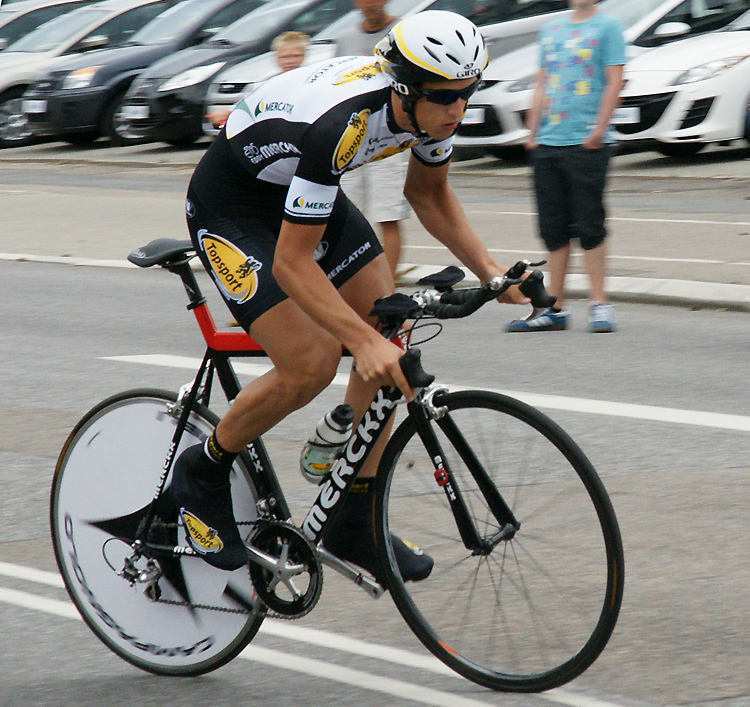
- Mertens at the 2009 Danmark Rundt.

Personal information
- Full name: Tim Mertens
- Born: 7 February 1986 (age 40) Mechelen, Belgium

Cycling career
- Sport: Cycling
- Current team: Retired
- Disciplines: Road and track
- Role: Rider

Amateur teams
- 1998–2001: WC Sprinters Malderen
- 2002–2006: WC Onder-Ons-Parike
- 2007–2008: Davitamon–Win for Life–Jong Vlaanderen

Professional team
- 2009–2013: Topsport Vlaanderen–Mercator

Tim Mertens (born 7 February 1986 in Mechelen) is a former Belgian professional racing cyclist. He got most of his successes on the track.

Mertens retired at the end of the 2013 season, at the age of 27.

== Career highlights ==
=== Track ===
2002
1st, National Novice Points Race Championships
2003
2nd, National Junior Individual Pursuit Championships
2004
3rd, European Junior Points Race Championships
2nd, World Junior Madison Championships
National Junior Championships

1st Track time trial
1st Individual pursuit
1st Points race

2nd, UIV U23 Cup – Ghent
2005
National Championships

1st Omnium
3rd Madison

3rd, UIV U23 Cup – Rotterdam
2006
3rd, UIV U23 Cup – Rotterdam
National Championships

1st Team pursuit
3rd Track time trial
3rd Scratch
3rd Individual pursuit

2007
1st Overall UIV U23 Cup

1st Rotterdam
1st Berlin
1st København

3rd, European Under-23 Team Pursuit Championships
3rd, Track World Cup, Scratch – Beijing
National Championships

1st Team pursuit
2nd Track time trial
2nd Scratch
2nd Omnium

2008
Track World Cup

1st Madison – Los Angeles
2nd Scratch – Manchester
2nd Scratch – Cali
1st Madison – Cali

3rd, National Derny Championships
2009
National Championships

1st Omnium
1st Scratch
1st Track time trial
1st Derny

1st Overall Track World Cup – Scratch
European Championships

4th Madison
7th Omnium

2010
1st National Scratch Championships
4th World Madison Championships
4th European Madison Championships

=== Road ===
2001
2nd, National Novice Road Race Championships
2004
2nd Overall Keizer der Juniores Koksijde

1st Stage 3

2010
8th Rund um Köln
