= Vojtěch Hačecký =

Czech cyclist

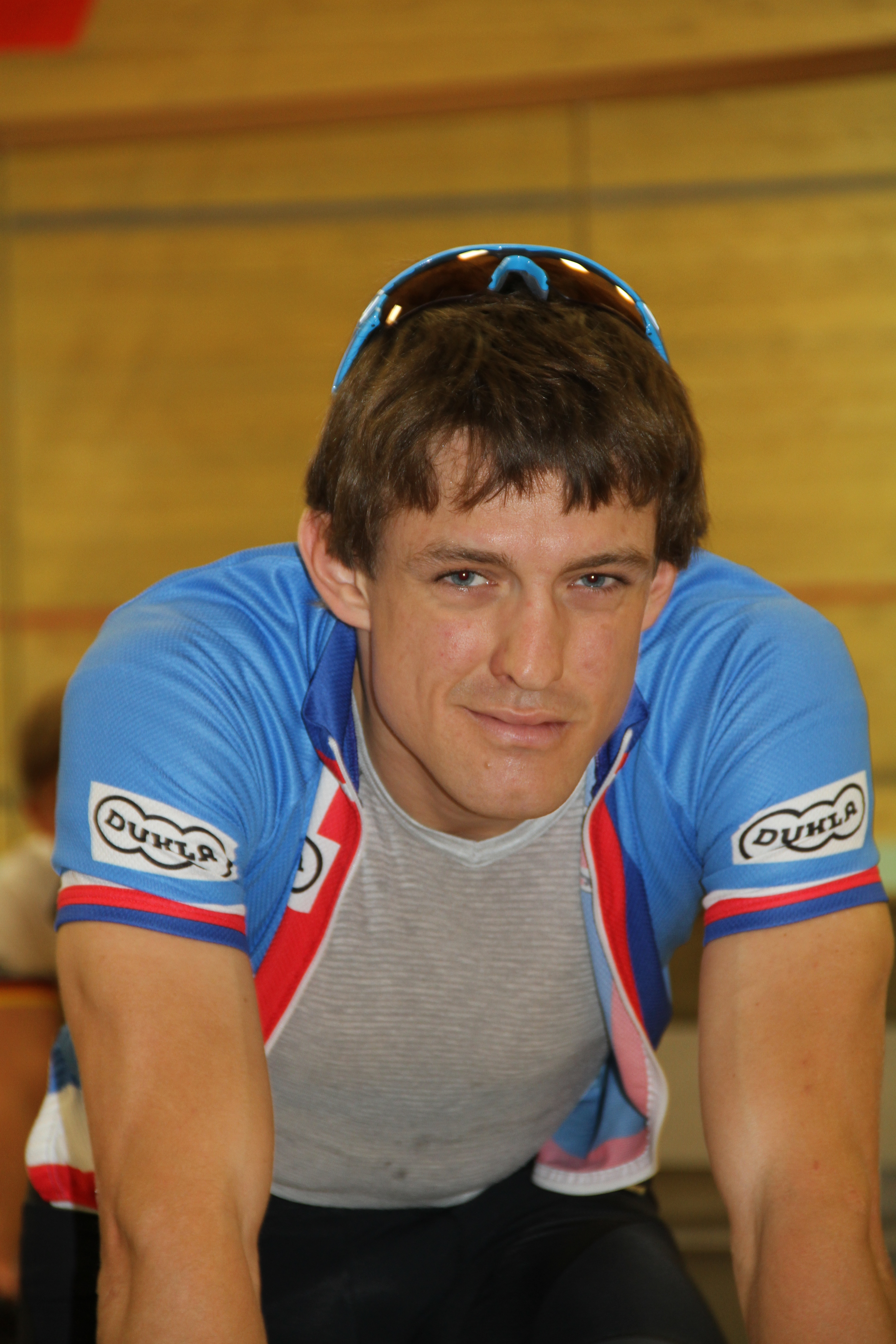
- Hačecký at the 2015 UEC European Track Championships

Personal information
- Full name: Vojtěch Hačecký
- Born: 29 March 1987 (age 39)

Cycling career
- Sport: Cycling
- Current team: Retired
- Disciplines: Road; Track
- Role: Rider

Professional teams
- 2010: Atlas Personal–BMC
- 2012–2015: ASC Dukla Praha
- 2016–2018: Whirlpool–Author

Vojtěch Hačecký (born 29 March 1987) is a Czech former professional racing cyclist. He rode at the 2015 UCI Track Cycling World Championships.

== Major results ==
2007
6th Prague–Karlovy Vary–Prague
2009
1st Time trial, National Under-23 Road Championships
1st Stage 1 Grand Prix Guillaume Tell
2nd ZLM Tour
6th Ronde van Vlaanderen U23
8th La Côte Picarde
9th Road race, UEC European Under-23 Road Championships
2010
6th Sparkassen Giro Bochum
6th Antwerpse Havenpijl
10th Overall Tour du Loir-et-Cher
10th Classic Loire Atlantique
2011
8th Overall Tour of Taihu Lake
9th Memoriał Andrzeja Trochanowskiego
2012
1st Stage 6 Tour d'Azerbaïdjan
2013
2nd Time trial, National Road Championships
2014
4th Tour of Yancheng Coastal Wetlands
2016
1st Memorial Grundmanna I Wizowskiego
5th Memoriał Romana Siemińskiego
6th Memoriał Andrzeja Trochanowskiego
2017
1st Stage 1 (TTT) Czech Cycling Tour
2nd GP Slovakia, Visegrad 4 Bicycle Race
3rd Memoriał Romana Siemińskiego
5th Memoriał Andrzeja Trochanowskiego
2018
Visegrad 4 Bicycle Race

2nd GP Poland
4th GP Slovakia

7th Memoriał Romana Siemińskiego
10th Memoriał Andrzeja Trochanowskiego
