= 2010 UCI Track Cycling World Championships – Men's team pursuit =

Rainbow jersey

The Men's Team Pursuit is one of the 10 men's events at the 2010 UCI Track Cycling World Championships, held in Ballerup, Denmark.

Seventeen teams of 4 cyclists each participated in the contest. After the qualifying, the fastest 2 teams raced for gold, and 3rd and 4th teams raced for bronze.

The Qualifying and the Finals were held on March 25.

== World record ==
World Record
WR	3:53.314	Great Britain	Beijing (China)	18 August 2008

== Qualifying ==
Rank	Name	Nation	Time	Notes
1	Steven Burke; Ed Clancy; Ben Swift; Andy Tennant	Great Britain	3:56.869	Q
2	Jack Bobridge; Rohan Dennis; Michael Hepburn; Leigh Howard	Australia	3:58.185	Q
3	Sam Bewley; Westley Gough; Peter Latham; Jesse Sergent	New Zealand	3:58.616	Q
4	Niki Byrgesen; Michael Færk Christensen; Jens-Erik Madsen; Rasmus Christian Quaade	Denmark	4:02.259	Q
5	Lyubomyr Polatayko; Maxim Polischuk; Vitaliy Popkov; Vitaliy Shchedov	Ukraine	4:04.776	
6	Levi Heimans; Arno van der Zwet; Tim Veldt; Sipke Zijlstra	Netherlands	4:04.818	
7	Ivan Kovalev; Victor Manakov; Alexei Markov; Alexander Serov	Russia	4:04.986	
8	Unai Elorriaga Zubiaur; Sergi Escobar; David Muntaner Juaneda; Eloy Teruel Rovira	Spain	4:05.570	
9	Vivien Brisse; Benoît Daeninck; Julien Duval; Julien Morice	France	4:07.051	
10	Robert Bartko; Robert Bengsch; Henning Bommel; Patrick Gretsch	Germany	4:07.265	
11	Angelo Ciccone; Marco Coledan; Alessandro De Marchi; Elia Viviani	Italy	4:08.512	
12	Chen Pan; Jiang Xiao; Li Chuanmin; Wang Jie	China	4:11.872	
13	Stephen Barrett; Matt Brammeier; Martyn Irvine; David O'Loughlin	Ireland	4:12.136	
14	Pawel Brylowski; Dawid Glowacki; Piotr Kasperkiewicz; Grzegorz Stępniak	Poland	4:12.481	
15	Damien Corthesy; Silvan Dillier; Loïc Perizzolo; Cyrille Thièry	Switzerland	4:13.023	
16	Georgios Bouglas; Dimitrios Chidemenakis; Dimitrios Polydoropoulos; Polychronis Tzottzakis	Greece	4:14.765	
17	Andreas Graf; Andreas Müller; Werner Riebenbauer; Georg Tazreiter	Austria	4:21.370	

== Finals ==
Rank	Name	Nation	Time
Gold Medal Race
1st place, gold medalist(s)	Jack Bobridge; Rohan Dennis; Michael Hepburn; Cameron Meyer	Australia	3:55.654
2nd place, silver medalist(s)	Steven Burke; Ed Clancy; Ben Swift; Andy Tennant	Great Britain	3:55.806
Bronze Medal Race
3rd place, bronze medalist(s)	Sam Bewley; Westley Gough; Peter Latham; Jesse Sergent	New Zealand	3:59.475
4	Niki Byrgesen; Michael Færk Christensen; Jens-Erik Madsen; Rasmus Christian Quaade	Denmark	4:01.664
