= 2017–18 UCI Track Cycling World Cup =

International track cycling competition

2017–2018 UCI Track Cycling World Cup
- Twenty-sixth edition of the UCI Track Cycling World Cup

Details
- Dates: 3 November 2017 – 21 January 2018
- Location: Poland, United Kingdom, Canada, Chile and Belarus
- Races: 5

The 2017–18 UCI Track Cycling World Cup (also known as the Tissot UCI Track Cycling World Cup for sponsorship reasons) was a multi-race tournament over a track cycling season. It was the 26th series of the UCI Track Cycling World Cup organised by the UCI. The series was run from 3 November 2017 to 21 January 2018 and consisted of five rounds.

== Series ==
On 11 May 2017 the UCI revealed the location and dates of the world cup meetings that took place in 2017. Four rounds took place in Pruszków, Poland, Manchester, Great Britain, Milton, Canada and Santiago, Chile. On 27 June 2017 the UCI expanded the World Cup to five events by adding Minsk, Belarus to the schedule for a round to take place in 2018. All venues except Manchester are hosting a round of the World Cup for the first time.

=== Pruszków, Poland ===
The first round was hosted in Pruszków. The racing was held on three full days between 3 and 5 November 2017 at the BGŻ BNP Paribas Arena. The venue hosted junior and under 23 European Championships in 2008, the World Championships in 2009 and the UEC European Track Cycling Championships in 2010.

=== Manchester, Great Britain ===
The second round was hosted in Manchester in Great Britain. This round was held between 10 and 12 November 2017 at HSBC UK National Cycling Centre. Manchester has previously hosted the 2002 Commonwealth Games, the 1996, 2000 and 2008 World Championships and seven times has hosted a round of the world cup. This will be the first time since 2013 that the venue has hosted this event.

=== Milton, Canada ===
The third round was hosted in Milton. The racing was held on three full days between 1 and 3 December 2017 at the Mattamy National Cycling Centre. The venue was built for the 2015 Pan and Parapan American Games held in Toronto.

=== Santiago, Chile ===
The penultimate round of this World Cup season was hosted in Santiago. This round was held between 8 and 10 December 2017 at the Parque Peñalolén velodrome. The venue was host to the 2014 South American Games

=== Minsk, Belarus ===
The final round of the world cup took place at the Velodrome Minsk-Arena. The venue hosted the 2009 European Championships and the World Championships in 2013.

=== Format ===
The following events will be raced at all rounds:

- Individual sprint, men and women
- Team sprint, men and women
- Keirin, men and women
- Team pursuit, men and women
- Madison, men and women
- Omnium, men and women

At the Purszkow round the points race, Scratch race events were included for both sexes and the women were additionally race the individual pursuit. The women also competed in the 500m Time Trial in Manchester and both sexes competed in the Scratch race. In the Milton round the points race was additionally held for both sexes. At the final round in Minsk the Scratch and points races were added to the schedule for both sexes; while the men were additionally race the individual pursuit.

On 2 November the UCI announced that the top three riders across the series in individual sprint, keirin, Omnium and Madison races received an additional bonus to their prize money.

The top three series bonus is:

- Winners of the final overall ranking: CHF 10,000
- 2nd in the final overall ranking: CHF 6,000
- 3rd in the final overall ranking: CHF 2,000.

The top three of each individual race during the series received in Euros, 625, 375, 250 respectively. The podium places of the team pursuit received in Euros 1250, 750, 500, for first, second and third place. Each pair in the Madison who finish in the top three received in Euros, 625, 375, 250 respectively. In the men's team sprint each time received in Euros 940, 560 and 375, while the women's team sprint received €625, 375 and 250 for a top three finish.

== Standings ==
=== Men ===
==== Sprint ====
Rank	after 5 events	Points
1	(Poland) Mateusz Rudyk	1600
2	(Ukraine) Andriy Vynokurov	1265
3	(United Kingdom) Lewis Oliva (Team Wales)	1235
4	(Lithuania) Vasilijus Lendel	1230
5	(Netherlands) Harrie Lavreysen	1125

==== Team Sprint ====
Rank	after 5 events	Points
1	France	3037.5
2	Germany	2287.5
3	Russia	2212.5
4	BEAT Cycling Club	1912.5
5	United Kingdom	1837.5

==== Team Pursuit ====
Rank	after 5 events	Points
1	Italy	2950
2	Denmark	2850
3	Germany	2800
4	Switzerland	2800
5	France	2700

==== Pursuit ====
Rank	after 1 event	Points
1	(United Kingdom) Charlie Tanfield (Team KGF)	500
2	(Portugal) Ivo Oliveira	450
3	(Russia) Alexander Evtushenko (Lokosphinx)	400
4	(Germany) Justin Wolf	375
5	(United States) Ashton Lambie	350

==== Madison ====
Rank	after 5 events	Points
1	Austria	1505
2	Denmark	1450
3	France	1400
4	Italy	1350
5	Belgium	1300

==== Omnium ====
Rank	after 5 events	Points
1	(Denmark) Niklas Larsen	1450
2	(Germany) Maximilian Beyer	1000
3	(Ukraine) Roman Gladysh	975
4	(Hong Kong) Leung Chun Wing	930
5	(Poland) Szymon Sajnok	900

==== Keirin ====
Rank	after 5 events	Points
1	(Ukraine) Andriy Vynokurov	1525
2	(Netherlands) Matthijs Büchli (BEAT Cycling Club)	1500
3	(United Kingdom) Lewis Oliva (Team Wales)	1420
4	(Spain) Juan Peralta	1245
5	(Germany) Joachim Eilers	1125

==== Scratch Race ====
Rank	after 3 events	Points
1	(United Kingdom) Jon Mould (Team Wales)	750
2	(Poland) Adrian Tekliński	745
3	(Belarus) Yauheni Karaliok	645
4	(Portugal) Ivo Oliveira	580
5	(Greece) Christos Volikakis	575

==== Points Race ====
Rank	after 3 events	Points
1	(Portugal) Ivo Oliveira	775
2	(Greece) Christos Volikakis	725
3	(Hong Kong) Cheung King Lok	640
4	(Netherlands) Jan-Willem van Schip	500
5	(Denmark) Niklas Larsen	500

==== 1Km Time Trial ====
Rank	after 1 event	Points
1	(Australia) Matthew Glaetzer	500
2	(Germany) Eric Engler (Track Team Brandenburg)	450
3	(United Kingdom) Callum Skinner (100% ME)	400
4	(Netherlands) Theo Bos (BEAT Cycling Club)	375
5	(Czech Republic) David Sojka	350

=== Women ===
==== Sprint ====
Rank	after 5 events	Points
1	(Netherlands) Laurine van Riessen (Matrix Pro Cycling)	1525
2	(Germany) Kristina Vogel	1500
3	(Lithuania) Simona Krupeckaitė	1350
4	(Ukraine) Olena Starikova	1060
5	(Netherlands) Shanne Braspennincx	1015

==== Team Sprint ====
Rank	after 5 events	Points
1	Germany	2000
2	RUS	1425
3	Holy Brother Cycling Team	1350
4	Netherlands	1275
5	United Kingdom	1225

==== Team Pursuit ====
Rank	after 5 events	Points
1	Italy	3700
2	Canada	2700
3	France	2650
4	Japan	2350
5	Germany	2150

==== 500m Time Trial ====
Rank	after 1 event	Points
1	(Russia) Daria Shmeleva	500
2	(Germany) Miriam Welte	450
3	(Ukraine) Olena Starikova	400
4	(Spain) Tania Calvo	375
5	(Mexico) Jessica Salazar	350

==== Madison ====
Rank	after 5 events	Points
1	Italy	1905
2	United Kingdom	1775
3	United States	1600
4	Russia	1300
5	France	1255

==== Omnium ====
Rank	after 5 events	Points
1	(United States) Jennifer Valente	1350
2	(Japan) Yumi Kajihara	1325
3	(Lithuania) Olivija Baleišytė	1175
4	(Netherlands) Kirsten Wild	1000
5	(China) Xiaofei Wang	975

==== Keirin ====
Rank	after 5 events	Points
1	(Germany) Kristina Vogel	1500
2	(Netherlands) Shanne Braspennincx	1225
3	(Japan) Yuka Kobayashi	1175
4	(Ukraine) Lyubov Basova	1125
5	(Czech Republic) Sara Kankovska	1075

==== Scratch Race ====
Rank	after 3 events	Points
1	(Italy) Rachele Barbieri	825
2	(Slovakia) Alžbeta Bačíková	770
3	(Switzerland) Aline Seitz	750
4	(Russia) Maria Averina	750
5	(Belgium) Jolien D'Hoore	750

==== Points Race ====
Rank	after 3 events	Points
1	(Norway) Anita Stenberg	925
2	(Netherlands) Kirsten Wild	850
3	(Czech Republic) Jarmila Machačová	790
4	(France) Coralie Demay	775
5	(Italy) Maria Giulia Confalonieri	725

==== Pursuit ====
Rank	after 1 event	Points
1	(Poland) Justyna Kaczkowska	500
2	(Netherlands) Annemiek van Vleuten	450
3	(Italy) Elisa Balsamo	400
4	(Germany) Gudrun Stock	375
5	(Ukraine) Valeriya Kononenko	350

=== Overall Team Standings ===
Overall team standings are calculated based on total number of points gained by the team's riders in each event.

Rank	Team	Round 1	Round 2	Round 3	Round 4	Round 5	Total Points
1	Germany	6433.5	6425.0	3545.0	2755.0	4245.0	23403.5
2	France	4545.0	6397.5	4152.5	1495.0	4070.0	20678.5
3	Italy	5391.0	4701.0	1982.0	3490.0	4795.0	19586.0
4	Russia	5647.0	3623.5		4055.0	5057.5	19204.5
5	United Kingdom	5590.0	4971.0	5800.0	2155.0		18897.5
6	Netherlands	4695.0	3836.0	2250.0	4575.0		17355.0
7	Poland	4415.0	3090.0	2815.0		5150.0	17235.5
8	Ukraine	5158.0	4161.0	2265.0	4700.0	2685.0	17155.0
9	New Zealand	5300.0	4930.0	5915.0	4840.0		15502.5
10	Spain	3120.5	3829.5	3147.5	1062.5	2110.0	13270.0

== Results ==
=== Men ===
Event	Winner	Second	Third
Poland, Pruszków | 3–5 November 2017
Sprint Details (pdf)	Matthew Glaetzer (AUS); 10.359/10.349	Mateusz Rudyk (POL) +0.014/+0.371	Edward Dawkins (NZL); 10.279/10.456
Team Sprint Details (pdf)	Netherlands; Jeffrey Hoogland; Harrie Lavreysen; Nils van 't Hoenderdaal; 42.906	France; Benjamin Edelin; Quentin Lafargue; Melvin Landerneau; 43.528	Great Britain; Jack Carlin; Ryan Owens; Joseph Truman; 43.192
Team Pursuit Details (pdf)	Italy; Francesco Lamon; Liam Bertazzo; Simone Consonni; Filippo Ganna; 3:56.433	Germany; Felix Gross; Theo Reinhardt; Nils Schomber; Domenic Weinstein; 3:57.778	Russia; Lev Gonov; Sergey Shilov; Ivan Smirnov; Dmitri Sokolov; 4:01.733
Keirin Details (pdf)	Matthijs Büchli (NED) (BEAT Cycling Club); 10.541	Joachim Eilers (GER) +0.055	Sebastien Vigier (FRA) +0.121
Points Race Details (pdf)	Nikita Panassenko (KAZ); 42 pts	Christos Volikakis (GRE); 27 pts	Liam Bertazzo (ITA); 21 pts
Scratch Race Details (pdf)	Robbe Ghys (BEL)	Edgar Stepanyan (ARM) (1 lap down)	Roy Pieters (BEL) (1 lap down)
Madison Details (pdf)	Australia; Callum Scotson; Cameron Meyer; 31 pts	Belgium; Moreno De Pauw; Kenny De Ketele; 29 pts	France; Florian Maitre; Benjamin Thomas; 27 pts
Omnium Details (pdf)	Niklas Larsen (DEN); 191 pts	Szymon Sajnok (POL); 149 pts	Claudio Imhof (SUI); 147 pts
United Kingdom, Manchester | 10–12 November 2017
Sprint Details (pdf)	Harrie Lavreysen (NED); 10.225/10.269	Mateusz Rudyk (POL) +0.114/+1.188	Matthew Glaetzer (AUS); DNF/DNF
Team Sprint Details (pdf)	Germany; Joachim Eilers; Robert Förstemann; Maximilian Levy; 43.095	BEAT Cycling Club; Theo Bos; Roy van den Berg; Matthijs Büchli; 43.542	Netherlands; Sam Ligtlee; Nils van 't Hoenderdaal; Jeffrey Hoogland; 43.426
Team Pursuit Details (pdf)	Great Britain; Steven Burke; Ed Clancy; Oliver Wood; Kian Emadi; 3:55.847	Denmark; Casper Pedersen; Casper von Folsach; Julius Johansen; Kristian Kaimer Eriksen; 4:01.535	France; Benjamin Thomas; Florian Maitre; Louis Pijourlet; Thomas Denis; 3:57.298
Keirin Details (pdf)	Matthijs Büchli (NED) (BEAT Cycling Club); 10.152	Andriy Vynokurov (UKR) +0.011	Juan Peralta (ESP) +0.172
1 km Time Trial Details (pdf)	Matthew Glaetzer (AUS); 1:00.081	Eric Engler (GER) (Track Team Brandenburg); 1:01.085	Callum Skinner (GBR) (100% ME); 1:01.161
Scratch Race Details (pdf)	Nikita Panassenko (KAZ)	Jon Mould (GBR) (Team Wales)	Wim Stroetinga (NED)
Madison Details (pdf)	Denmark; Niklas Larsen; Casper von Folsach; 46 pts	France; Benjamin Thomas; Morgan Kneisky; 46 pts	Poland; Daniel Staniszewski; Wojciech Pszczolarski; 37 pts
Omnium Details (pdf)	Benjamin Thomas (FRA); 151 pts	Niklas Larsen (DEN); 140 pts	Albert Torres (ESP); 125 pts
Canada, Milton | 1–3 December 2017
Sprint Details (pdf)	Jeffrey Hoogland (NED); 10.143/10.554	Ethan Mitchell (NZL) +0.074/+0.310	Jack Carlin (GBR); 10.454/10.335
Team Sprint Details (pdf)	New Zealand; Edward Dawkins; Ethan Mitchell; Sam Webster; 43.336	Great Britain; Jack Carlin; Philip Hindes; Callum Skinner; 43.922	Czech Republic; Martin Cechman; Pavel Kelemen; David Sojka; 44.094
Team Pursuit Details (pdf)	New Zealand; Campbell Stewart; Thomas Sexton; Jared Gray; Nicholas Kergozou; 3:59.000	Canada; Derek Gee; Adam Jamieson; Jay Lamoureux; Michael Foley; 3:59.982	Switzerland; Gino Mäder; Robin Froidevaux; Lukas Rüegg; Gaël Suter; 4:03.425
Keirin Details (pdf)	Harrie Lavreysen (NED); 10.103	Lewis Oliva (GBR) (Team Wales) +0.075	Joachim Eilers (GER) +0.119
Points Race Details (pdf)	Niklas Larsen (DEN); 40 pts	Mark Stewart (GBR); 19 pts	Kenny De Ketele (BEL); 15 pts
Madison Details (pdf)	Belgium; Kenny De Ketele; Lindsay De Vylder; 32 pts	New Zealand; Thomas Sexton; Campbell Stewart; 26 pts	Great Britain; Mark Stewart; Oliver Wood; 25 pts
Omnium Details (pdf)	Niklas Larsen (DEN); 132 pts	Oliver Wood (GBR); 120 pts	Gaël Suter (SUI); 112 pts
Chile, Santiago | 8–10 December 2017
Sprint Details (pdf)	Vasilijus Lendel (LTU) +0.040/10.060/10.535	Denis Dmitriev (RUS); 10.078/+0.024/+0.117	Andriy Vynokurov (UKR); 10.279/10.029
Team Sprint Details (pdf)	Russia; Denis Dmitriev; Shane Perkins; Pavel Yakushevskiy; 42.955	France; Rayan Helal; Melvin Landerneau; François Pervis; 43.736	South Korea; Im Chae-bin; Park Jeong; Son Je-yong; 43.578
Team Pursuit Details (pdf)	New Zealand; Campbell Stewart; Jared Gray; Nicholas Kergozou; Harry Waine; 3:54.618	Japan; Shunsuke Imamura; Ryo Chikatani; Shogo Ichimaru; Keitaro Sawada; 4:02.740	United States; Gavin Hoover; Ashton Lambie; Adrian Hegyvary; Eric Young; 4:04.163
Keirin Details (pdf)	Yuta Wakimoto (JPN); 9.906	Andriy Vynokurov (UKR) +0.256	Pavel Kelemen (CZE) +0.400
Madison Details (pdf)	New Zealand; Thomas Sexton; Campbell Stewart; 32 pts	Italy; Francesco Lamon; Michele Scartezzini; 25 pts	Austria; Andreas Graf; Andreas Müller; 20 pts
Omnium Details (pdf)	Daniel Holloway (USA); 146 pts	Eiya Hashimoto (JPN); 143 pts	Roman Gladysh (UKR); 128 pts
Belarus, Minsk | 19–21 January 2018
Sprint Details (pdf)	Matthijs Büchli (NED) (BEAT Cycling Club); 10.361/10.204	Vasilijus Lendel (LTU) +0.059/+0.018	Theo Bos (NED) (BEAT Cycling Club); 10.837/10.730
Team Sprint Details (pdf)	BEAT Cycling Club; Roy van den Berg; Matthijs Büchli; Theo Bos; 43.397	Poland; Rafał Sarnecki; Krzysztof Maksel; Kamil Kuczyński; 44.116	France; Benjamin Edelin; Michaël D'Almeida; Rayan Helal; 43.948
Individual Pursuit Details (pdf)	Charlie Tanfield (GBR) (Team KGF); 4:12.253	Ivo Oliveira (POR); 4:19.718	Alexander Evtushenko (RUS) (Lokosphinx); 4:19.089
Team Pursuit Details (pdf)	Team KGF; Daniel Bigham; Charlie Tanfield; Harry Tanfield; Jonathan Wale; 3:56.015	Lokosphinx; Kirill Sveshnikov; Alexander Evtushenko; Sergey Shilov; Dmitri Sokolov; 3:58.385	Russia; Lev Gonov; Dmitry Mukhomediarov; Ivan Smirnov; Gleb Syritsa; 4:00.501
Keirin Details (pdf)	Matthijs Büchli (NED) (BEAT Cycling Club); 9.693	Stefan Ritter (CAN) +0.544	Lewis Oliva (GBR) (Team Wales) +0.585
Points Race Details (pdf)	Jan-Willem van Schip (NED); 75 pts	Cheung King Lok (HKG); 50 pts	Ivo Oliveira (POR); 41 pts
Scratch Race Details (pdf)	Yauheni Karaliok (BLR)	Ivo Oliveira (POR)	Vitaliy Hryniv (UKR)
Madison Details (pdf)	Hong Kong; Leung Chun Wing; Cheung King Lok; 30 pts	Netherlands; Roy Pieters; Wim Stroetinga; 27 pts	Portugal; Rui Oliveira; Ivo Oliveira; 25 pts
Omnium Details (pdf)	Jan-Willem van Schip (NED); 134 pts	Szymon Sajnok (POL); 129 pts	Mamyr Stash (RUS) (Lokosphinx); 110 pts

=== Women ===
Event	Winner	Second	Third
Poland, Pruszków | 3–5 November 2017
Sprint Details (pdf)	Kristina Vogel (GER); 11.297/11.403	Stephanie Morton (AUS) +0.092/+0.067	Mathilde Gros (FRA); 11.411/+0.329/11.575
Team Sprint Details (pdf)	Germany; Pauline Grabosch; Kristina Vogel; 32.668	Netherlands; Kyra Lamberink; Hetty van de Wouw; 33.238	Russia; Daria Shmeleva; Anastasia Voynova; 32.631
Individual Pursuit Details (pdf)	Justyna Kaczkowska (POL); 3:31.261	Annemiek van Vleuten (NED); 3:36.497	Elisa Balsamo (ITA); 3:33.888
Team Pursuit Details (pdf)	Italy; Elisa Balsamo; Tatiana Guderzo; Francesca Pattaro; Silvia Valsecchi; 4:21.965	Canada; Allison Beveridge; Ariane Bonhomme; Annie Foreman-Mackey; Kinley Gibson; 4:23.993	Great Britain; Emily Nelson; Neah Evans; Emily Kay; Manon Lloyd; 4:22.230
Keirin Details (pdf)	Kristina Vogel (GER); 11.024	Daria Shmeleva (RUS) +0.067	Stephanie Morton (AUS) +0.196
Points Race Details (pdf)	Lotte Kopecky (BEL); 25 pts	Hanna Solovey (UKR); 23 pts	Coralie Demay (FRA); 22 pts
Omnium Details (pdf)	Kirsten Wild (NED); 129 pts	Jennifer Valente (USA); 127 pts	Amalie Dideriksen (DEN); 116 pts
Scratch Race Details (pdf)	Maria Averina (RUS)	Justyna Kaczkowska (POL)	Olivija Baleišytė (LTU)
Madison Details (pdf)	Belgium; Lotte Kopecky; Jolien D'Hoore; 29 pts	Great Britain; Elinor Barker; Emily Nelson; 23 pts	Italy; Maria Giulia Confalonieri; Elisa Balsamo; 13 pts
United Kingdom, Manchester | 10–12 November 2017
Sprint Details (pdf)	Kristina Vogel (GER); 11.202/11.238	Laurine van Riessen (NED) (Matrix Pro Cycling) +0.136/+0.394	Anastasia Voynova (RUS) +0.030/11.492/11.472
Team Sprint Details (pdf)	Germany; Kristina Vogel; Miriam Welte; 32.382	Russia; Anastasia Voynova; Daria Shmeleva; 33.151	Holy Brother Cycling Team; Shanju Bao; Yufang Guo; 33.202
Team Pursuit Details (pdf)	Great Britain; Elinor Barker; Katie Archibald; Emily Nelson; Neah Evans; 4:16.803	Italy; Francesca Pattaro; Elisa Balsamo; Tatiana Guderzo; Silvia Valsecchi; 4:21.562	Japan; Kie Furuyama; Yumi Kajihara; Kisato Nakamura; Yuya Hashimoto; 4:28.668
500m Time Trial Details (pdf)	Daria Shmeleva (RUS); 33.613	Miriam Welte (GER); 33.634	Olena Starikova (UKR); 33.825
Keirin Details (pdf)	Kristina Vogel (GER); 11.696	Shanne Braspennincx (NED) +0.294	Laurine van Riessen (NED) (Matrix Pro Cycling) +0.776
Omnium Details (pdf)	Jennifer Valente (USA); 139 pts	Katie Archibald (GBR); 134 pts	Amalie Dideriksen (DEN); 120 pts
Scratch Race Details (pdf)	Rachele Barbieri (ITA)	Yang Qianyu (HKG)	Jolien D'Hoore (BEL)
Madison Details (pdf)	Great Britain; Elinor Barker; Katie Archibald; 32 pts	Belgium; Jolien D'Hoore; Lotte Kopecky; 30 pts	Italy; Rachele Barbieri; Elisa Balsamo; 9 pts
Canada, Milton | 1–3 December 2017
Sprint Details (pdf)	Kristina Vogel (GER); 11.678/11.571	Shanne Braspennincx (NED) +0.409/+0.090	Laurine van Riessen (NED); 11.897/+0.002/11.719
Team Sprint Details (pdf)	Germany; Kristina Vogel; Miriam Welte; 32.759	Netherlands; Hetty van de Wouw; Laurine van Riessen; 33.926	South Korea; Kim Won-gyeong; Lee Hye-jin; 33.603
Team Pursuit Details (pdf)	Canada; Ariane Bonhomme; Kinley Gibson; Annie Foreman-Mackey; Allison Beveridge	New Zealand; Rushlee Buchanan; Kirstie James; Bryony Botha; Michaela Drummond (Overlapped)	France; Clara Copponi; Coralie Demay; Laurie Berthon; Valentine Fortin; 4:32.466
Keirin Details (pdf)	Kristina Vogel (GER); 11.333	Katy Marchant (GBR) +0.085	Shanne Braspennincx (NED) +0.173
Points Race Details (pdf)	Katie Archibald (GBR); 47 pts	Jasmin Duehring (CAN); 38 pts	Jarmila Machačová (CZE); 24 pts
Omnium Details (pdf)	Yumi Kajihara (JPN); 154 pts	Allison Beveridge (CAN); 120 pts	Ellie Dickinson (GBR); 118 pts
Madison Details (pdf)	Great Britain; Katie Archibald; Ellie Dickinson; 29 pts	France; Coralie Demay; Laurie Berthon; 24 pts	New Zealand; Racquel Sheath; Michaela Drummond; 15 pts
Chile, Santiago | 8–10 December 2017
Sprint Details (pdf)	Lyubov Basova (UKR); 11.268/11.625	Daria Shmeleva (RUS) +2.568/+5.237	Lee Hye-jin (KOR); 11.912/11.595
Team Sprint Details (pdf)	Ukraine; Lyubov Basova; Olena Starikova; 32.512	Holy Brother Cycling Team; Shanju Bao; Yufang Guo; 33.274	South Korea; Kim Won-gyeong; Lee Hye-jin; 33.337
Team Pursuit Details (pdf)	New Zealand; Racquel Sheath; Bryony Botha; Rushlee Buchanan; Kirstie James; 4:17.804	Italy; Simona Frapporti; Marta Cavalli; Francesca Pattaro; Silvia Valsecchi; 4:19.415	Japan; Yuya Hashimoto; Kie Furuyama; Kisato Nakamura; Nao Suzuki; 4:28.615
Keirin Details (pdf)	Madalyn Godby (USA); 11.484	Natasha Hansen (NZL) +0.044	Lyubov Basova (UKR) +0.059
Omnium Details (pdf)	Yumi Kajihara (JPN); 129 pts	Elisa Balsamo (ITA); 128 pts	Tetyana Klimchenko (UKR); 119 pts
Madison Details (pdf)	New Zealand; Michaela Drummond; Racquel Sheath; 22 pts	Denmark; Trine Schmidt; Julie Leth; 16 pts	Italy; Elisa Balsamo; Marta Cavalli; 13 pts
Belarus, Minsk | 19–21 January 2018
Sprint Details (pdf)	Pauline Grabosch (GER); 11.277/+0.064/11.376	Simona Krupeckaitė (LTU) +0.190/11.276/+0.193	Nicky Degrendele (BEL); 11.354/11.388
Team Sprint Details (pdf)	Germany; Pauline Grabosch; Emma Hinze; 33.175	Lithuania; Miglė Marozaitė; Simona Krupeckaitė; 33.352	South Korea; Kim Won-gyeong; Lee Hye-jin; 33.439
Team Pursuit Details (pdf)	United States; Jennifer Valente; Kelly Catlin; Chloé Dygert; Kimberly Geist; 4:15.673	Italy; Martina Alzini; Elisa Balsamo; Marta Cavalli; Simona Frapporti; 4:23.921	Canada; Devaney Collier; Maggie Coles-Lyster; Erin Attwell; Laurie Jussaume
Keirin Details (pdf)	Nicky Degrendele (BEL); 10.995	Lee Hye-jin (KOR) +0.192	Lyubov Basova (UKR) +0.337
Points Race Details (pdf)	Kirsten Wild (NED); 45 pts	Maria Giulia Confalonieri (ITA); 33 pts	Anita Stenberg (NOR); 28 pts
Omnium Details (pdf)	Kirsten Wild (NED); 122 pts	Elinor Barker (GBR); 119 pts	Jennifer Valente (USA); 114 pts
Scratch Race Details (pdf)	Aline Seitz (SUI)	Elinor Barker (GBR)	Amy Pieters (NED)
Madison Details (pdf)	Italy; Letizia Paternoster; Maria Giulia Confalonieri; 29 pts	Netherlands; Kirsten Wild; Amy Pieters; 26 pts	Russia; Maria Novolodskaya; Olga Zabelinskaya; 25 pts
