= Michael Færk Christensen =

Danish cyclist

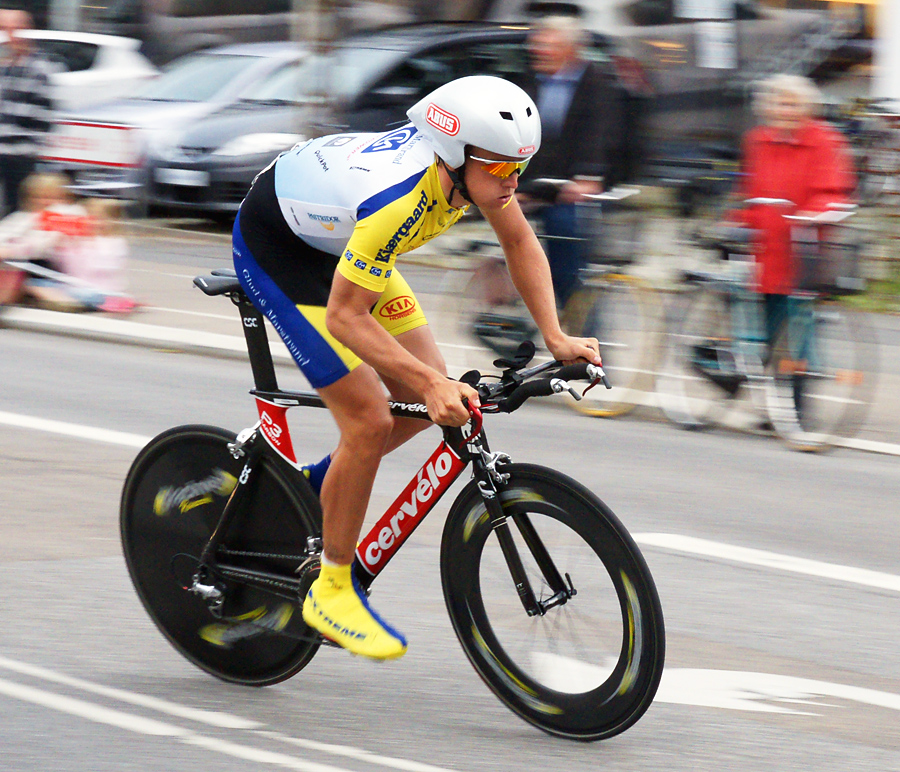

Personal information
- Full name: Michael Færk Christensen
- Born: 14 February 1986 (age 40) Hobro, Denmark

Cycling career
- Sport: Cycling
- Current team: Glud & Marstrand Horsens
- Disciplines: Road, track
- Role: Rider

Professional team
- 2008: Glud & Marstrand Horsens
Medal record
Representing Denmark
Men's track cycling
Summer Olympics
Silver medal – second place	2008 Beijing	Team pursuit
World Championships
Gold medal – first place	2009 Pruszków	Team pursuit
Silver medal – second place	2008 Manchester	Team pursuit

Michael Færk Christensen (born 14 February 1986 in Hobro) is a Danish professional racing cyclist.

== Major results ==
Date	Placing	Event	Competition	Location	Country
27 March 2008	2nd place, silver medalist(s)	Team pursuit (Note: The other riders on the squad were Casper Jørgensen, Jens-Erik Madsen and Alex Rasmussen)	World Championships	Manchester	United Kingdom
18 August 2008	2nd place, silver medalist(s)	Team pursuit (Note: Christensen took part in the qualifying round only. The other riders on the squad were Casper Jørgensen, Jens-Erik Madsen, Michael Mørkøv and Alex Rasmussen)	Olympic Games	Beijing	China
1 November 2008	2	Team pursuit (Note: The other riders on the squad were Casper Jørgensen, Daniel Kreutzfeldt and Jens-Erik Madsen)	World Cup	Manchester	United Kingdom
14 February 2009	3	Team pursuit (Note: The other riders on the squad were Niki Byrgesen, Daniel Kreutzfeldt and Jens-Erik Madsen)	World Cup	Ballerup	Denmark
27 March 2009	1st place, gold medalist(s)	Team pursuit (Note: Christensen took part in the final round only. The other riders on the squad were Casper Jørgensen, Jens-Erik Madsen, Alex Rasmussen and in the qualifying round only Michael Mørkøv)	World Championships	Pruszków	Poland
