= 2016–17 UCI Track Cycling World Cup =

International track cycling competition

2016–2017 UCI Track Cycling World Cup
- Twenty-fifth edition of the UCI Track Cycling World Cup

Details
- Dates: 4 November 2016 – 26 February 2017
- Location: Colombia, Netherlands, United Kingdom and United States
- Races: 4

The 2016–17 UCI Track Cycling World Cup was a multi-race series over a track cycling season. It was the 25th edition of the UCI Track Cycling World Cup organised by the UCI. The series ran from 4 November 2016 to 26 February 2017 and consisted of four rounds.

== Series ==
This World Cup season consisted of four rounds, in Glasgow (United Kingdom), Apeldoorn (the Netherlands), Cali (Colombia) and Los Angeles (United States).

=== Glasgow, Great Britain ===
The first round was hosted in Glasgow. The racing was held on three full days between 4 and 6 November 2016 at the Sir Chris Hoy Velodrome. Glasgow returned to the calendar for the first time since 2013. The venue will host the UEC European Track Cycling Championships in 2018.

=== Apeldoorn, The Netherlands ===
The second round was hosted in Apeldoorn in the Gelderland province of the Netherlands. This round was held between 11 and 13 November 2016 at Omnisport Apeldoorn. Apeldoorn has previously hosted the 2011 and 2013 UEC European Track Cycling Championships and also previously hosted the 2011 UCI Track Cycling World Championships.

=== Cali, Colombia ===
The third round will be hosted in Cali. Cali is the third most populated city in Colombia and a regular site for the World Cup series, with this year's meeting being the fourteenth time the city has hosted a World Cup round. The racing will be held on three full days between 17 and 19 February 2017 at the Velódromo Alcides Nieto Patiño. The venue recently hosted the UCI Track Cycling World Championships in 2014.

=== Los Angeles, United States ===
The last round of this World Cup season will be hosted in Los Angeles. This round will be held between 25 and 26 February 2017 at the VELO Sports Center. Los Angeles returns to the World Cup calendar for the first time since 2008.

== Standings ==
=== Men ===
==== Sprint ====
Rank	after all 4 events	Points
1	(Ukraine) Andriy Vynokurov	1525
2	(Poland) Kamil Kuczyński	1475
4	(Russia) Pavel Yakushevskiy	1260
3	(Russia) Denis Dmitriev	1000
5	(Germany) Max Niederlag	900

==== Team Sprint ====
Rank	after all 4 events	Points
1	Germany	2587.5
2	France	2475.0
3	Poland	2182.5
4	Russia	2175.0
5	Spain	1882.5

==== Team Pursuit ====
Rank	after all 3 events	Points
1	France	2350
2	Belgium	2200
3	Russia	2000
4	Poland	1900
5	Switzerland	1880

==== Pursuit ====
Rank	after the only event	Points
1	(France) Sylvain Chavanel	500
2	(Poland) Daniel Staniszewski	450
3	(Netherlands) Dion Beukeboom	400
4	(Germany) Leif Lampater	375
5	(Kazakhstan) Artyom Zakharov	350

==== Madison ====
Rank	after all 4 events	Points
1	Italy	1365
2	Switzerland	1300
3	France	1300
4	Belgium	1275
5	Ireland	1250

==== Omnium ====
Rank	after all 3 events	Points
1	(Poland) Szymon Sajnok	1325
2	(France) Morgan Kneisky	650
3	(United Kingdom) Christopher Latham	650
3	(South Korea) Park Sang-hoon	605
4	(Australia) Sam Welsford	500

==== Keirin ====
Rank	after all 4 events	Points
1	(Czech Republic) Tomáš Bábek	1400
2	(Lithuania) Vasilijus Lendel	1375
3	(Ukraine) Andriy Vynokurov	1325
4	(Malaysia) Muhammad Shah Firdaus Sahrom (Isn Track Team)	1125
5	(United Kingdom) Lewis Oliva (Team USN)	1100

==== Scratch Race ====
Rank	after all 2 events	Points
1	(Belarus) Yauheni Karaliok	825
2	(Republic of Ireland) Felix English	750
3	(Belarus) Raman Ramanau (Minsk Cycling Club)	620
4	(Russia) Maxim Piskunov	525
5	(Italy) Francesco Castegnaro	490

==== Points Race ====
Rank	after all 3 events	Points
1	(Republic of Ireland) Mark Downey	1000
2	(Spain) Eloy Teruel	975
3	(Belgium) Kenny De Ketele	700
4	(Belarus) Raman Ramanau (Minsk Cycling Club)	690
5	(Kazakhstan) Sultanmurat Miraliyev	650

==== 1Km Time Trial ====
Rank	after the only event	Points
1	(Poland) Krzysztof Maksel	500
2	(Germany) Maximilian Dörnbach	450
4	(Czech Republic) Tomáš Bábek	400
3	(Russia) Alexandr Vasyukhno	375
5	(New Zealand) Jordan Castle	350

=== Women ===
==== Sprint ====
Rank	after all 4 events	Points
1	(Ukraine) Olena Starikova	1165
2	(Spain) Tania Calvo	1150
3	(Germany) Kristina Vogel	1000
4	(China) Han Jun	995
5	(Lithuania) Migle Marozaite	975

==== Team Sprint ====
Rank	after all 4 events	Points
1	Spain	1590
2	China	1475
3	Italy	1025
4	Gazprom-RusVelo	950
5	United States	875

==== Team Pursuit ====
Rank	after all 3 events	Points
1	Italy	2550
2	France	2250
3	Poland	2000
4	Great Britain	1700
5	Canada	1600

==== 500m Time Trial ====
Rank	after the only event	Points
1	(Germany) Pauline Grabosch	500
2	(Hong Kong) Lee Wai Sze	450
3	(Spain) Tania Calvo	400
4	(Netherlands) Kyra Lamberink	375
5	(Ukraine) Olena Starikova	350

==== Madison ====
Rank	after all 2 events	Points
1	Great Britain	850
2	France	825
3	Australia	750
4	Russia	725
5	Italy	700

==== Omnium ====
Rank	after all 3 events	Points
1	(Belgium) Lotte Kopecky	1325
2	(United Kingdom) Emily Kay	950
3	(Belarus) Tatsiana Sharakova	890
4	(Italy) Rachele Barbieri	800
5	(Norway) Anita Stenberg	730

==== Keirin ====
Rank	after all 4 events	Points
1	(Ukraine) Liubov Basova	1325
2	(Belgium) Nicky Degrendele	1225
3	(China) Liu Lili	1090
4	(Russia) Tatiana Kiseleva	1020
5	(Germany) Kristina Vogel	1000

==== Scratch Race ====
Rank	after all 3 events	Points
1	(Russia) Evgenia Romanyuta	850
2	(Ukraine) Tetyana Klimchenko	825
3	(Republic of Ireland) Lydia Gurley	775
4	(France) Élise Delzenne	725
5	(Italy) Rachele Barbieri	725

==== Points Race ====
Rank	after all 2 events	Points
1	(Czech Republic) Jarmila Machačová	625
2	(Belgium) Lotte Kopecky	510
3	(Australia) Amy Cure	500
4	(United Kingdom) Elinor Barker	500
5	(United States) Sarah Hammer	450

==== Pursuit ====
Rank	after the only event	Points
1	(United States) Chloé Dygert	500
2	(Australia) Ashlee Ankudinoff	450
3	(New Zealand) Jaime Nielsen	400
4	(Poland) Justyna Kaczkowska	375
5	(Belarus) Tatsiana Sharakova (Minsk Cycling Club)	350

=== Overall team standings ===
Overall team standings are calculated based on total number of points gained by the team's riders in each event.

Rank	Team	Round 1	Round 2	Round 3	Round 4	Total Points
1	France	5680.0	4175.0	5032.5	4597.5	19485.0
2	Russia	4550.0	3645.0	5045.0	3365.0	16605.0
3	Poland	4350.0	3322.5	4295.0	3491.0	15458.5
4	Ukraine	4110.0	4040.0	2685.0	3860.0	14695.0
5	Great Britain	5800.0	5915.0	1730.0	1050.0	14495.0
6	Germany	3522.5	3356.0	3935.0	3275.0	14088.5
7	Italy	3675.0	3265.0	3960.0	2930.0	13830.0
8	Spain	3937.5	4737.5	3700.0	1443.5	13818.5
9	Australia	3808.5	1923.5	4270.0	1865.0	11867.0
10	Belgium	3360.0	3455.0	3955.0	0.0	10770.0

== Results ==
=== Men ===
Event	Winner	Second	Third
Great Britain, Glasgow | 4–6 November 2016
Sprint Details (pdf)	Kamil Kuczyński (POL) +0.032/10.560/10.563	Pavel Yakushevskiy (RUS); 10.463/+0.009/+0.058	Andriy Vynokurov (UKR); 10.374/10.541
Team Sprint Details (pdf)	Great Britain; Jack Carlin; Ryan Owens; Joseph Truman; 43.479	France; Sébastien Vigier; Benjamin Edelin; Quentin Lafargue; 44.414	Poland; Maciej Bielecki; Mateusz Rudyk; Kamil Kuczyński; 43.962
Individual Pursuit Details (pdf)	Sylvain Chavanel (FRA); 4:20.567	Daniel Staniszewski (POL); 4:22.875	Dion Beukeboom (NED); 4:20.742
Team Pursuit Details (pdf)	Great Britain; Mark Stewart; Kian Emadi; Andy Tennant; Oliver Wood; 3:58.891	France; Benjamin Thomas; Sylvain Chavanel; Corentin Ermenault; Adrien Garel; 4:00.230	Canada; Adam Jamieson; Aidan Caves; Jay Lamoureux; Bayley Simpson; 4:01.958
Keirin Details (pdf)	Tomáš Bábek (CZE); 10.370	Vasilijus Lendel (LTU) +0.092	Lewis Oliva (GBR) (Team USN) +0.124
Points Race Details (pdf)	Cameron Meyer (AUS); 81 pts	Benjamin Thomas (FRA); 44 pts	Sam Harrison (GBR) (Team USN); 29 pts
Scratch Race^{[C1]} Details (pdf)	Robbe Ghys (BEL)	Maxim Piskunov (RUS)	Ivo Oliveira (POR)
Madison Details (pdf)	Spain; Sebastián Mora; Albert Torres; 45 pts	Australia; Cameron Meyer; Callum Scotson; 44 pts	Belgium; Kenny De Ketele; Moreno De Pauw; 41 pts
Netherlands, Apeldoorn | 11–13 November 2016
Sprint Details (pdf)	Andriy Vynokurov (UKR); 10.343/10.619	Kamil Kuczyński (POL) +0.034/+0.529	Sébastien Vigier (FRA); 10.358/10.528
Team Sprint Details (pdf)	Great Britain; Jack Carlin; Ryan Owens; Joseph Truman; 43.860	France; Sébastien Vigier; Benjamin Edelin; Quentin Lafargue; 45.092	Germany; Robert Förstemann; Eric Engler; Tobias Wächter; 44.571
Team Pursuit Details (pdf)	Canada; Adam Jamieson; Aidan Caves; Jay Lamoureux; Bayley Simpson; 4:02.144	Belgium; Moreno De Pauw; Kenny De Ketele; Robbe Ghys; Gerben Thijssen; 4:06.216	France; Benjamin Thomas; Morgan Kneisky; Louis Pijourlet; Adrien Garel; 4:02.732
Keirin Details (pdf)	Tomáš Bábek (CZE); 10.483	Andriy Vynokurov (UKR) +0.106	Juan Peralta (ESP) +0.147
Scratch Race Details (pdf)	Raman Ramanau (BLR) (Minsk Cycling Club)	Christopher Latham (GBR) (1 lap down)	Moreno De Pauw (BEL) (1 lap down)
Points Race Details (pdf)	Mark Downey (IRL); 18 pts	Morgan Kneisky (FRA); 14 pts	Sultanmurat Miraliyev (KAZ); 14 pts
Madison Details (pdf)	Belgium; Robbe Ghys; Kenny De Ketele; 40 pts	Italy; Francesco Lamon; Simone Consonni; 28 pts	Great Britain; Mark Stewart; Oliver Wood; 19 pts
Omnium Details (pdf)	Szymon Sajnok (POL); 127 pts	Albert Torres (ESP); 124 pts	Benjamin Thomas (FRA); 107 pts
Colombia, Cali | 17–19 February 2017
Sprint Details (pdf)	Denis Dmitriev (RUS); 10.253/10.456	Max Niederlag (GER) +0.380/+0.023	Pavel Yakushevskiy (RUS); 10.334/10.449
Team Sprint Details (pdf)	Germany; Robert Förstemann; Eric Engler; Maximilian Dörnbach; 43.598	Poland; Maciej Bielecki; Mateusz Rudyk; Michał Lewandowski; 45.058	Russia; Pavel Yakushevskiy; Kirill Samusenko; Aleksei Tkachev; 44.495
Team Pursuit Details (pdf)	Denmark; Niklas Larsen; Julius Johansen; Frederik Madsen; Casper Pedersen; 3:59.475	Lokosphinx; Alexander Evtushenko; Sergey Shilov; Dmitri Sokolov; Mamyr Stash; 4:01.068	Russia; Evgeny Kovalev; Vladislav Kulikov; Alexey Kurbatov; Andrey Sazanov; 3:59.066
Keirin Details (pdf)	Fabián Puerta (COL); 10.357	François Pervis (FRA) +0.108	Tomáš Bábek (CZE) +0.110
Omnium Details (pdf)	Sam Welsford (AUS); 128 pts	Lindsay De Vylder (BEL); 107 pts	Casper von Folsach (DEN); 104 pts
1 km Time Trial Details (pdf)	Krzysztof Maksel (POL); 1:00.814	Maximilian Dörnbach (GER); 1:01.094	Tomáš Bábek (CZE); 1:01.169
Points Race Details (pdf)	Mark Downey (IRL); 35 pts	Niklas Larsen (DEN); 25 pts	Robbe Ghys (BEL); 16 pts
Madison Details (pdf)	Denmark; Casper von Folsach; Niklas Larsen; 64 pts	Ireland; Felix English; Mark Downey; 55 pts	Russia; Andrey Sazanov; Viktor Manakov; 32 pts
United States, Los Angeles | 25–26 February 2017
Sprint Details (pdf)	Denis Dmitriev (RUS) +2.632/10.320/10.332	Max Niederlag (GER); 10.770/+0.316/+0.089	Sam Webster (NZL)
Team Sprint Details (pdf)	New Zealand; Ethan Mitchell; Sam Webster; Edward Dawkins; 43.710	Germany; Erik Balzer; Eric Engler; Max Niederlag; 43.974	Poland; Maciej Bielecki; Mateusz Rudyk; Krzysztof Maksel; 44.184
Keirin Details (pdf)	Fabián Puerta (COL); 10.522	Hugo Barrette (CAN) +0.042	Muhammad Shah Firdaus Sahrom (MAS) (Isn Track Team) +0.075
Omnium Details (pdf)	Szymon Sajnok (POL); 121 pts	Campbell Stewart (NZL); 115 pts	Park Sang-hoon (KOR); 115 pts
Scratch Race Details (pdf)	Yauheni Karaliok (BLR)	Thomas Denis (FRA)	Thomas Sexton (NZL)
Madison Details (pdf)	Ireland; Felix English; Mark Downey; 57 pts	Denmark; Julius Johansen; Casper Pedersen; 45 pts	New Zealand; Campbell Stewart; Thomas Sexton; 44 pts

=== Women ===
Event	Winner	Second	Third
Great Britain, Glasgow | 4–6 November 2016
Sprint Details (pdf)	Simona Krupeckaitė (LTU); 11.714/11.497	Liubov Basova (UKR) +0.115/+0.185	Tania Calvo (ESP); 11.641/11.824
Team Sprint Details (pdf)	Spain; Tania Calvo; Helena Casas; 33.351	China; Han Jun; Liu Lili; 33.705	Russia; Natalia Antonova; Tatiana Kiseleva; 33.630
Individual Pursuit^{[C1]} Details (pdf)	Justyna Kaczkowska (POL); 3:33.319	Élise Delzenne (FRA); 3:39.326	Tatsiana Sharakova (BLR); 3:39.681
Team Pursuit Details (pdf)	Great Britain; Emily Kay; Eleanor Dickinson; Manon Lloyd; Emily Nelson; 4:25.809	Italy; Simona Frapporti; Elisa Balsamo; Maria Giulia Confalonieri; Francesca Pattaro; 4:27.703	France; Roxane Fournier; Laurie Berthon; Élise Delzenne; Coralie Demay; 4:26.725
Keirin Details (pdf)	Simona Krupeckaitė (LTU); 11.637	Liubov Basova (UKR) +0.064	Courtney Field (AUS) +0.067
Omnium Details (pdf)	Emily Kay (GBR); 121 pts	Lotte Kopecky (BEL); 120 pts	Tatsiana Sharakova (BLR); 119 pts
Scratch Race Details (pdf)	Élise Delzenne (FRA)	Minami Uwano (JPN)	Evgenia Romanyuta (RUS)
Madison Details (pdf)	Great Britain; Manon Lloyd; Katie Archibald; 25 pts	France; Laurie Berthon; Coralie Demay; 23 pts	Russia; Maria Averina; Diana Klimova; 13 pts
Netherlands, Apeldoorn | 11–13 November 2016
Sprint Details (pdf)	Lee Wai Sze (HKG); 11.815/12.066	Tania Calvo (ESP) +0.194/+0.758	Laurine van Riessen (NED); 11.731/12.115
Team Sprint Details (pdf)	Spain; Tania Calvo; Helena Casas; 33.442	Netherlands; Kyra Lamberink; Shanne Braspennincx; 34.025	China; Han Jun; Liu Lili; 33.989
500m Time Trial Details (pdf)	Pauline Grabosch (GER); 33.974 WJR	Lee Wai Sze (HKG); 34.094	Tania Calvo (ESP); 34.256
Keirin Details (pdf)	Liubov Basova (UKR); 11.913	Nicky Degrendele (BEL) +0.014	Lee Wai Sze (HKG) +0.034
Points Race Details (pdf)	Elinor Barker (GBR); 39 pts	Minami Uwano (JPN); 33 pts	Jarmila Machačová (CZE); 28 pts
Omnium Details (pdf)	Kirsten Wild (NED); 122 pts	Emily Kay (GBR); 107 pts	Rachele Barbieri (ITA); 106 pts
Colombia, Cali | 17–19 February 2017
Sprint Details (pdf)	Kristina Vogel (GER); 11.253/11.143	Anastasia Voynova (RUS) (Gazprom–RusVelo) +0.038/+0.097	Daria Shmeleva (RUS) (Gazprom–RusVelo); 11.617/11.433
Team Sprint Details (pdf)	Germany; Miriam Welte; Kristina Vogel; 32.441	Gazprom–RusVelo; Daria Shmeleva; Anastasiia Voinova; 32.521	Spain; Tania Calvo; Helena Casas; 33.325
Team Pursuit Details (pdf)	Australia; Amy Cure; Ashlee Ankudinoff; Alexandra Manly; Rebecca Wiasak; 4:25.821	Italy; Simona Frapporti; Beatrice Bartelloni; Silvia Valsecchi; Francesca Pattaro; 4:33.193	Canada; Stephanie Roorda; Ariane Bonhomme; Laura Brown; Kinley Gibson; 4:25.789
Keirin Details (pdf)	Kristina Vogel (GER); 11.535	Martha Bayona (COL) +0.097	Nicky Degrendele (BEL) +0.243
Omnium Details (pdf)	Lotte Kopecky (BEL); 128 pts	Emily Nelson (GBR); 118 pts	Rachele Barbieri (ITA); 114 pts
Points Race Details (pdf)	Amy Cure (AUS); 20 pts	Sarah Hammer (USA); 15 pts	Simona Frapporti (ITA); 13 pts
Scratch Race Details (pdf)	Sarah Hammer (USA)	Evgenia Romanyuta (RUS)	Lydia Gurley (IRL)
United States, Los Angeles | 25–26 February 2017
Sprint Details (pdf)	Kristina Vogel (GER); 11.396/11.595	Liubov Basova (UKR) +0.744/+0.233	Anastasia Voynova (RUS) (Gazprom–RusVelo); 11.621/11.633
Team Sprint Details (pdf)	Gazprom–RusVelo; Daria Shmeleva; Anastasiia Voinova; 32.853	Canada; Amelia Walsh; Kate O'Brien; 34.146	South Korea; Lee Hye-jin; Kim Won-gyeong; 33.929
Individual Pursuit Details (pdf)	Chloé Dygert (USA); 3:28.431	Ashlee Ankudinoff (AUS); 3:35.921	Jaime Nielsen (NZL); 3:34.056
Team Pursuit Details (pdf)	United States; Kelly Catlin; Chloé Dygert; Kimberly Geist; Jennifer Valente; 4:19.990	New Zealand; Rushlee Buchanan; Michaela Drummond; Jaime Nielsen; Racquel Sheath; 4:24.619	Canada; Jasmin Duehring; Annie Foreman-Mackey; Laura Brown; Kirsti Lay; 4:25.487
Keirin Details (pdf)	Kristina Vogel (GER); 11.093	Martha Bayona (COL) +0.111	Natasha Hansen (NZL) +0.132
Scratch Race Details (pdf)	Tetyana Klimchenko (UKR)	Jasmin Duehring (CAN)	Elinor Barker (GBR) (1 lap down)
Madison Details (pdf)	Australia; Amy Cure; Alexandra Manly; 20 pts	New Zealand; Michaela Drummond; Racquel Sheath; 19 pts	Italy; Rachele Barbieri; Maria Giulia Confalonieri; 18 pts

=== Note ===
- ^{^{C1}}Designated a Class 1 event by the UCI, from which fewer ranking points are available. Medals are awarded in full World Cup events only.

== Medal table ==
Rank	Team	Gold	Silver	Bronze	Total
1	Germany	7	4	1	12
2	Great Britain	7	3	2	12
3	Australia	5	2	1	8
4	Poland	4	3	2	9
5	Ukraine	3	4	1	8
6	Spain	3	2	4	9
7	Ireland	3	1	1	5
8	United States	3	1	0	4
9	France	2	8	4	14
10	Belgium	2	4	4	10
11	Gazprom–RusVelo	2	2	2	6
12	Denmark	2	2	1	5
13	Colombia	2	2	0	4
14	Lithuania	2	1	0	3
15	Czech Republic	2	0	3	5
16	New Zealand	1	3	5	9
17	Canada	1	3	3	7
18	Russia	1	2	7	10
19	Netherlands	1	1	2	4
20	Hong Kong	1	1	1	3
21	Belarus	1	0	1	2
22	Minsk Cycling Club	1	0	0	1
23	Italy	0	3	4	7
24	Japan	0	2	0	2
25	China	0	1	1	2
26	Lokosphinx	0	1	0	1
27	South Korea	0	0	2	2
27	Team USN	0	0	2	2
29	Isn Track Team	0	0	1	1
29	Kazakhstan	0	0	1	1
Totals (30 entries)		56	56	56	168
