= 2017 UCI Track Cycling World Championships – Men's points race =

Men's points race at the 2017 UCI Track Cycling World Championships
- Venue: Hong Kong Velodrome
- Location: Hong Kong
- Dates: 14 April
- Competitors: 24 from 24 nations
- Winning points: 76

Medalists
gold medal	Cameron Meyer	Australia
silver medal	Kenny De Ketele	Belgium
bronze medal	Wojciech Pszczolarski	Poland

The Men's points race competition at the 2017 World Championships was held on 14 April 2017.

== Results ==
120 laps (30 km) were raced with 12 sprints.

Rank	Name	Nation	Lap points	Sprint points	Total points
1st place, gold medalist(s)	Cameron Meyer	Australia	40	36	76
2nd place, silver medalist(s)	Kenny De Ketele	Belgium	20	20	40
3rd place, bronze medalist(s)	Wojciech Pszczolarski	Poland	20	20	40
4	Niklas Larsen	Denmark	20	14	34
5	Regan Gough	New Zealand	0	24	24
6	Morgan Kneisky	France	0	16	16
7	Mark Stewart	Great Britain	0	11	11
8	Claudio Imhof	Switzerland	0	9	9
9	Krisztián Lovassy	Hungary	0	8	8
10	Mark Downey	Ireland	0	6	6
11	Nikita Panassenko	Kazakhstan	0	4	4
12	Andreas Graf	Austria	0	4	4
13	Raman Ramanau	Belarus	0	3	3
14	Lucas Liss	Germany	0	3	3
15	Michele Scartezzini	Italy	0	2	2
16	Dmitrii Strakhov	Russia	0	1	1
17	Eloy Teruel	Spain	0	1	1
18	Martin Bláha	Czech Republic	0	0	0
19	João Matias	Portugal	−20	3	−17
20	Zachary Kovalcik	United States	−20	0	−20
21	Vitaliy Hryniv	Ukraine	−40	2	−38
22	Cheung King Lok	Hong Kong	−40	0	−40
—	Adam Jamieson	Canada	DNF		
—	Takuto Kurabayashi	Japan	DNF		
