= Cameron Meyer =

Australian racing cyclist

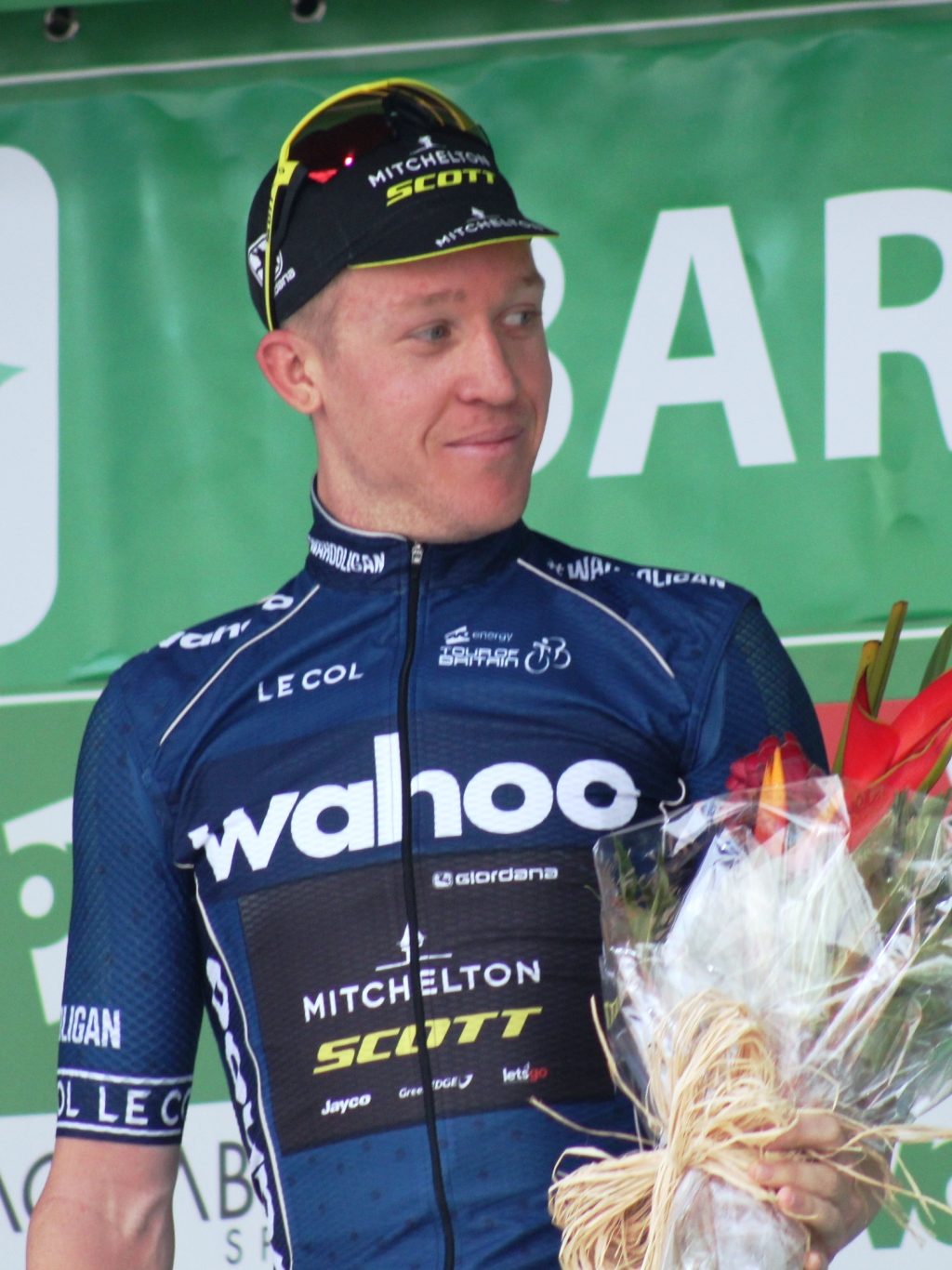
- Meyer at the 2018 Tour of Britain

Personal information
- Born: 11 January 1988 (age 38) Viveash, Western Australia, Australia
- Height: 1.81 m (5 ft 11 in)
- Weight: 70 kg (154 lb)

Cycling career
- Sport: Cycling
- Current team: Retired
- Discipline: Road
- Role: Rider
- Rider type: Roleur

Amateur team
- Midland CC

Professional teams
- 2009–2011: Garmin–Slipstream
- 2012–2015: GreenEDGE
- 2016: Team Dimension Data
- 2017: Mitchelton Scott
- 2018–2022: Mitchelton–Scott.

Major wins
- Road Grand Tours Tour de France 1 TTT stage (2013) Giro d'Italia 1 TTT stage (2014) Stage races Tour Down Under (2011) Herald Sun Tour (2015) One-day races and Classics National Time Trial Championships (2010, 2011) National Road Race Championships (2020, 2021) Track World Championships Madison (2010, 2011) Points race (2009, 2010, 2012, 2017, 2018) Team pursuit (2010, 2017)
Medal record
Representing Australia
Men's track cycling
World Championships
Gold medal – first place	2009 Pruszków	Points race
Gold medal – first place	2010 Ballerup	Points race
Gold medal – first place	2010 Ballerup	Madison
Gold medal – first place	2010 Ballerup	Team pursuit
Gold medal – first place	2011 Apeldoorn	Madison
Gold medal – first place	2012 Melbourne	Points race
Gold medal – first place	2017 Hong Kong	Points race
Gold medal – first place	2017 Hong Kong	Team pursuit
Gold medal – first place	2018 Apeldoorn	Points race
Silver medal – second place	2009 Pruszków	Team pursuit
Silver medal – second place	2009 Pruszków	Madison
Silver medal – second place	2011 Apeldoorn	Points race
Silver medal – second place	2017 Hong Kong	Madison
Bronze medal – third place	2012 Melbourne	Madison
Bronze medal – third place	2018 Apeldoorn	Madison
Commonwealth Games
Gold medal – first place	2010 Delhi	Points race
Gold medal – first place	2010 Delhi	Scratch
Gold medal – first place	2010 Delhi	Team pursuit
Men's road bicycle racing
World Championships
Bronze medal – third place	2012 Valkenburg	Team time trial
Commonwealth Games
Gold medal – first place	2018 Gold Coast	Time trial

Cameron Meyer (born 11 January 1988) is an Australian former professional racing cyclist, who competed as a professional from 2009 to 2022.

== Career ==
Born in Viveash, Western Australia, Meyer started cycling at the age of 13 in 2001 and first represented his country at the World Junior Track Championships in 2005. He was an Australian Institute of Sport scholarship holder.

Meyer won his first senior World Championship in the Points Race in Pruszków, Poland. In 2009 he was selected to ride the Giro d'Italia. He won the time-trial event at the 2010 Australian National Road Race Championships.

Meyer's younger brother Travis Meyer is also a professional racing cyclist, and was one of GreenEDGE's first signings alongside Cameron and fellow Australian Jack Bobridge. After four seasons with Orica–GreenEDGE, in October 2015 Meyer announced that he would be joining Team Dimension Data for the 2016 season, alongside fellow Australians Nathan Haas and Mark Renshaw.

Meyer announced his departure from Team Dimension Data on 14 June 2016; for personal reasons of an undisclosed nature. After a short break, he decided to enter the Six Day London track race with Callum Scotson and placed third overall. He subsequently competed for Australia at the 2017 UCI Track Cycling World Championships, where he took two golds in the points race and as part of the Australian team pursuit squad, and rode for the Australian national team on the road during 2017, winning the Dwars door de Vlaamse Ardennen and scoring top five finishes in the Cadel Evans Great Ocean Road Race and the Herald Sun Tour. In August 2017, Mitchelton–Scott announced that Meyer would rejoin them on a three-year contract from 2018, with a focus on winning the madison at the 2018 Commonwealth Games and the 2020 Summer Olympics. In 2020 and 2021 he won the Australian National Road Race Championships.

Meyer retired from the sport in September 2022, after thirteen years as a professional. Meyer then became the coach for British Cycling's track women's endurance team.

== Major results ==
=== Road ===
2005
7th Time trial, UCI World Junior Championships
2006
National Junior Championships

1st Road race
2nd Time trial

5th Time trial, UCI World Junior Championships
2007
1st Overall Tour of Tasmania

1st Stages 2 & 5

1st Stage 3 Tour of Gippsland
2nd Road race, National Under-23 Championships
2008
1st Overall Tour of Japan
3rd Time trial, UCI World Under-23 Championships
3rd Gran Premio Industrie del Marmo
2009
2nd Time trial, National Championships
2010
1st Time trial, National Championships
3rd Overall Tour of Oman
2011
1st Time trial, National Championships
1st Overall Tour Down Under

1st Young rider classification
1st Stage 4

1st Overall Tour de Perth
3rd OCBC Cycle Singapore
2012
2nd Time trial, National Championships
3rd Team time trial, UCI World Championships
10th Overall Tirreno–Adriatico

1st Stage 1 (TTT)

2013
1st Road race, Oceania Championships
1st Criterium, National Championships
1st Mountains classification, Circuit de la Sarthe
1st Stage 4 (TTT) Tour de France
5th Overall Tour of California
5th Overall Tour of Turkey
10th Overall Tour de Suisse

1st Stage 1 (ITT)

2014
1st Stage 2 Tour de Suisse
1st Stage 1 (TTT) Giro d'Italia
4th Road race, National Championships
9th Overall Herald Sun Tour
2015
1st Overall Herald Sun Tour

1st Sprints classification
1st Stage 1

4th Prueba Villafranca de Ordizia
Combativity award Stage 1 Vuelta a España
2016
2nd Road race, National Championships
2017
1st Dwars door de Vlaamse Ardennen
3rd Overall Rás Tailteann
3rd Cadel Evans Great Ocean Road Race
4th Overall Herald Sun Tour
7th Overall Tour of China I
7th Overall Tour of Quanzhou Bay
2018
Commonwealth Games

1st Time trial
9th Road race

1st Stage 2 Tour of Britain
2nd Overall Herald Sun Tour
2019
1st Stage 1b (TTT) Settimana Internazionale di Coppi e Bartali
National Championships

3rd Road race
3rd Time trial

2020
1st Road race, National Championships
2021
1st Road race, National Championships

==== Grand Tour general classification results timeline ====
Grand Tour	2009	2010	2011	2012	2013	2014	2015	2016	2017	2018	2019	2020	2021
Giro d'Italia	DNF	137	136	—	—	DNF	—	—	—	—	—	DNF	111
Tour de France	—	—	—	—	130	—	—	—	—	—	—	—	—
/ Vuelta a España	—	—	—	DNF	—	DNF	DNF	—	—	—	—	—	—

Legend
—	Did not compete
DNF	Did not finish

=== Track ===
2005
1st Madison, National Junior Championships (with Adam O'Connor)
2006
UCI World Junior Championships

1st Individual pursuit
1st Madison (with Travis Meyer)
1st Team pursuit

National Junior Championships

1st Individual pursuit
1st Points race
1st Team pursuit
1st Madison (with Travis Meyer)

2007
UCI World Cup Classics

3rd Points race, Sydney
3rd Points race, Beijing

2008
UCI World Cup Classics

1st Points race, Los Angeles
3rd Team pursuit, Copenhagen

2009
UCI World Championships

1st Points race
2nd Madison (with Leigh Howard)
2nd Team pursuit

2010
UCI World Championships

1st Madison (with Leigh Howard)
1st Points race
1st Team pursuit

Commonwealth Games

1st Team pursuit
1st Points race
1st Scratch

UCI World Cup Classics, Melbourne

1st Madison (with Leigh Howard)
1st Team pursuit

2011
UCI World Championships

1st Madison (with Leigh Howard)
2nd Points race

Oceania Championships

1st Madison (with Leigh Howard)
1st Team pursuit

1st Madison, National Championships (with Leigh Howard)
2nd Six Days of Berlin (with Leigh Howard)
2012
1st Points race, UCI World Championships
1st Six Days of Berlin (with Leigh Howard)
2016
1st Madison, National Championships (with Sam Welsford)
2nd Madison, UCI World Cup, Glasgow (with Callum Scotson)
3rd Six Days of London (with Callum Scotson)
2017
UCI World Championships

1st Points race
1st Team pursuit
2nd Madison (with Callum Scotson)

National Championships

1st Points race
1st Team pursuit
2nd Individual pursuit

1st Madison, UCI World Cup (with Callum Scotson), Pruszków
1st Six Days of London (with Callum Scotson)
2018
UCI World Championships

1st Points race
3rd Madison (with Callum Scotson)
