= 2009 UCI Track Cycling World Championships – Men's team pursuit =

Men's team pursuit at the 2009 UCI Track Cycling World Championships
- Venue: BGŻ Arena, Pruszków
- Date: 27 March 2009

The Men's team pursuit event of the 2009 UCI Track Cycling World Championships was held on 27 March 2009.

== Results ==
=== Qualifying ===
Heat	Name	Nation	1000 m	2000 m	3000 m	Time	Speed (km/h)	Rank
1	Casper Jorgensen; Jens-Erik Madsen; Michael Mørkøv; Alex Rasmussen	Denmark	1:03.549 (2)	2:01.036 (1)	3:00.102 (1)	03:59.892	60.027	Q
2	Jack Bobridge; Rohan Dennis; Leigh Howard; Cameron Meyer	Australia	1:03.879 (3)	2:02.581 (3)	3:01.560 (3)	04:00.581	59.855	Q
3	Jonathan Bellis; Steven Burke; Ed Clancy; Peter Kennaugh	United Kingdom	1:03.387 (1)	2:01.677 (2)	3:01.050 (2)	04:00.818	59.796	q
4	Westley Gough; Peter Latham; Marc Ryan; Jesse Sergent	New Zealand	1:04.570 (4)	2:02.966 (4)	3:01.667 (4)	04:01.186	59.704	q
5	Sergi Escobar Roure; David Muntaner Juaneda; Antonio Tauler Llull; Eloy Teruel Rovira	Spain	1:05.328 (6)	2:04.458 (5)	3:03.846 (5)	04:04.485	58.899	
6	Robert Bengsch; Henning Bommel; Patrick Gretsch; Roger Kluge	Germany	1:05.774 (8)	2:06.092 (8)	3:06.063 (6)	04:07.262	58.237	
7	Levi Heimans; Geert-Jan Jonkman; Arno van der Zwet; Sipke Zijlstra	Netherlands	1:05.301 (5)	2:05.358 (6)	3:06.494 (7)	04:08.667	57.908	
8	Volodymyr Diudia; Lyubomyr Polatayko; Mykhaylo Radionov; Vitaliy Shchedov	Ukraine	1:05.771 (7)	2:05.625 (7)	3:06.551 (8)	04:08.736	57.892	
9	Dominique Cornu; Ingmar De Poortere; Stijn Steels; Maarten Vlasselaer	Belgium	1:06.915 (12)	2:07.388 (11)	3:07.485 (9)	04:08.825	57.871	
10	Juan Esteban Arango; Arles Castro; Edwin Ávila; Carlos Urán	Colombia	1:06.181 (9)	2:06.691 (9)	3:07.557 (10)	04:10.111	57.574	
11	Libin Chen; Wei Li; Teng Ma; Xuelong Qu	China	1:06.548 (11)	2:06.825 (10)	3:08.599 (11)	04:10.886	57.396	
12	Arnaud Depreeuw; Julien Duval; Ronan Guinaudeau; Mickael Jeannin	France	1:06.322 (10)	2:07.772 (12)	3:09.334 (12)	04:11.544	57.246	
13	Dawid Glowacki; Piotr Kasperkiewicz; Adrian Kurek; Jakub Sredzinki	Poland	1:07.884 (13)	2:09.340 (13)	3:11.054 (13)	04:13.454	56.815	
DNS	Valery Kaikov; Leonid Krasnov; Vladimir Shchekunov; Stanislav Volkov	Russia				DNS		

=== Finals ===
Rank	Name	Nation	1000 m	2000 m	3000 m	Time	Speed (km/h)
Bronze medal race
3rd place, bronze medalist(s)	Westley Gough; Peter Latham; Marc Ryan; Jesse Sergent	New Zealand	1:03.718 (1)	2:01.847 (1)	3:01.079 (1)	04:00.248	59.938
4	Jonathan Bellis; Steven Burke; Ed Clancy; Peter Kennaugh	United Kingdom	1:04.466 (2)	2:02.964 (2)	3:02.381 (2)	04:01.838	59.543
Gold medal race
1st place, gold medalist(s)	Casper Jorgensen; Jens-Erik Madsen; Michael Faerk Christensen; Alex Rasmussen	Denmark	1:03.380 (2)	2:00.654 (1)	2:58.826 (1)	03:58.246	60.441
2nd place, silver medalist(s)	Jack Bobridge; Rohan Dennis; Leigh Howard; Cameron Meyer	Australia	1:03.165 (1)	2:01.247 (2)	2:59.577 (2)	03:58.863	60.285

== Final classification ==
Rank	Names	Nation
1st place, gold medalist(s)	Casper Jorgensen; Jens-Erik Madsen; Michael Faerk Christensen; Alex Rasmussen	Denmark
2nd place, silver medalist(s)	Jack Bobridge; Rohan Dennis; Leigh Howard; Cameron Meyer	Australia
3rd place, bronze medalist(s)	Westley Gough; Peter Latham; Marc Ryan; Jesse Sergent	New Zealand
4	Jonathan Bellis; Steven Burke; Ed Clancy; Peter Kennaugh	United Kingdom
5	Sergi Escobar Roure; David Muntaner Juaneda; Antonio Tauler Llull; Eloy Teruel Rovira	Spain
6	Robert Bengsch; Henning Bommel; Patrick Gretsch; Roger Kluge	Germany
7	Levi Heimans; Geert-Jan Jonkman; Arno van der Zwet; Sipke Zijlstra	Netherlands
8	Volodymyr Diudia; Lyubomyr Polatayko; Mykhaylo Radionov; Vitaliy Shchedov	Ukraine
9	Dominique Cornu; Ingmar De Poortere; Stijn Steels; Maarten Vlasselaer	Belgium
10	Juan Esteban Arango; Arles Castro; Edwin Ávila; Carlos Urán	Colombia
11	Libin Chen; Wei Li; Teng Ma; Xuelong Qu	China
12	Arnaud Depreeuw; Julien Duval; Ronan Guinaudeau; Mickael Jeannin	France
13	Dawid Glowacki; Piotr Kasperkiewicz; Adrian Kurek; Jakub Sredzinki	Poland
-	Valery Kaikov; Leonid Krasnov; Vladimir Shchekunov; Stanislav Volkov	Russia
