= Han Jun =

Han Jun may refer to：

- Han Jun (politician) (born 1963), Chinese male politician
- Han Jun (track cyclist) (born 1990), Chinese female track cyclist
