= Lewis Oliva =

Welsh racing cyclist

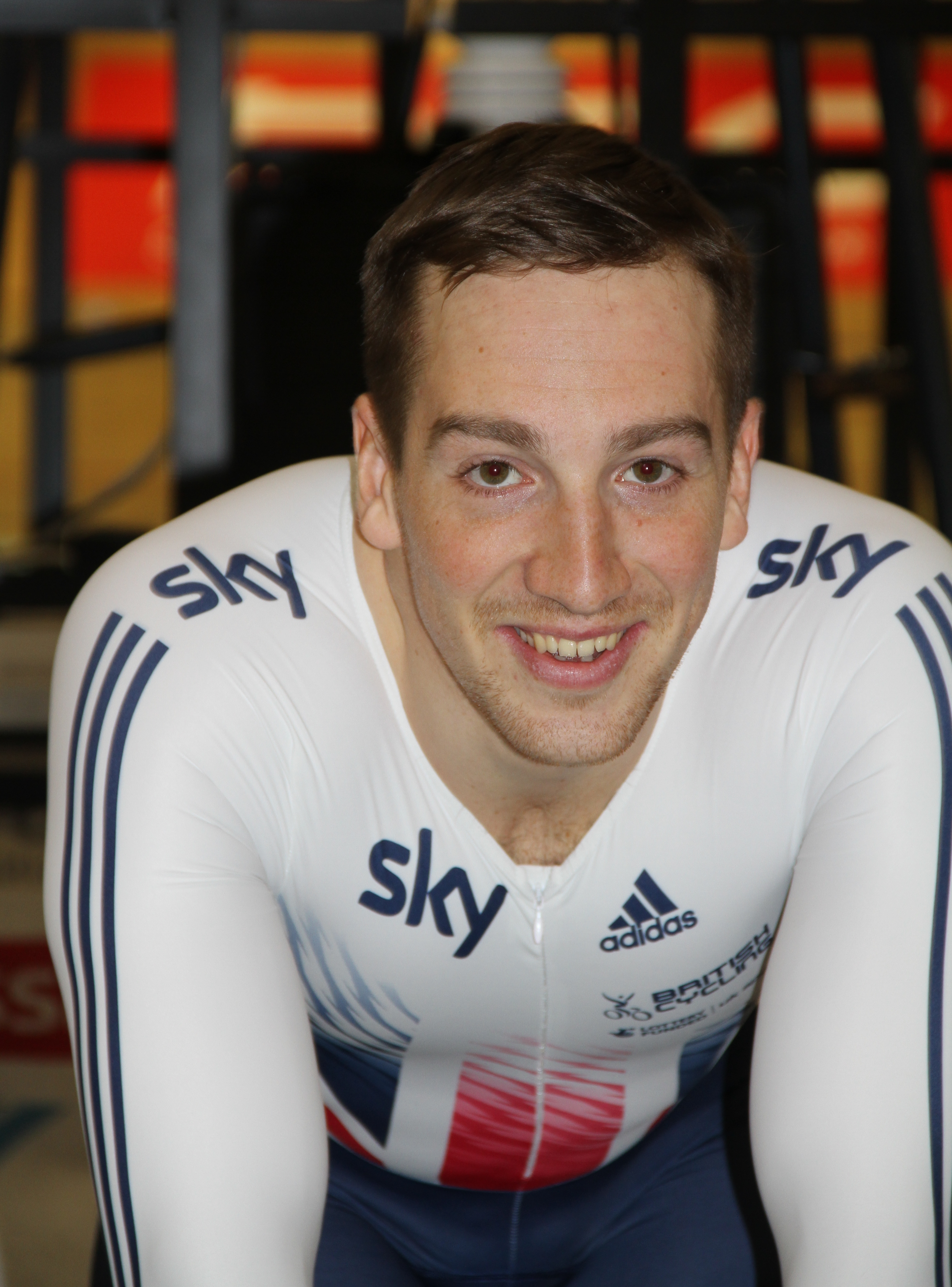
- Oliva at the 2015 UEC European Track Championships

Personal information
- Full name: Lewis Oliva
- Born: 23 August 1992 (age 34) Monmouthshire, Wales
- Height: 188 cm (6 ft 2 in)
- Weight: 100 kg (220 lb)

Cycling career
- Sport: Cycling
- Current team: Team USN
- Discipline: Track
- Role: Rider
- Rider type: Sprinter
Medal record
Representing Wales
Commonwealth Games
Silver medal – second place	2018 Gold Coast	Keirin

Lewis Oliva (born 23 August 1992) is a Welsh racing cyclist from Monmouthshire, Wales, who has ridden on the track for the Welsh Cycling backed professional track team since September 2016. Prior to this he was part of the Great Britain cycling team for eight years as a sprint athlete.

In addition to his five British titles, Lewis is the current British keirin champion after successfully defending his title on 26/01/2018. He was successful in winning various international accolades, culminating in five world cup medals and multiple European and world championship honours. Oliva has also represented Wales at the Commonwealth Games at Delhi 2010, Glasgow, 2014 and Gold Coast 2018. He took the silver medal in the keirin in the 2018 Games, after progressing from the first round via the repechages. His most recent competition (World Championship) representing Great Britain was the 2017 Worlds, where he competed in the keirin, his favourite event whilst balancing a vigorous training regime alongside his demanding studies at Cardiff Medical School. In October 2018 he announced that he would be stepping away from international competition after that year's edition of the Six Days of London in order to concentrate on his medical studies, although he did not rule out a comeback once he had completed his medical degree.

Oliva was educated at Shirenewton Primary School, then at Monmouth School: he participated in the Queen's Baton Relay there in September 2017, ahead of the 2018 Commonwealth Games. He subsequently spent six years studying for a degree in philosophy with the Open University whilst being part of the British Cycling Academy programme. Since 2016, he has been a student of Medicine at Cardiff University in Wales. He is married to fellow racing cyclist and physiotherapist Ciara Horne.

== Prize list ==
2009
1st Keirin, British National Track Championships

2010
2nd Keirin, British National Track Championships
3rd Sprint, British National Track Championships

2011
3rd Team sprint, British National Track Championships

2012
2nd Sprint, British National Track Championships
1st Team Sprint, British National Track Championships
3rd Team Sprint, European Track Championships

2013
3rd Keirin, British National Track Championships

2014
3rd Team Sprint, Round 3, Mexico, 2013–14 UCI Track Cycling World Cup
3rd Keirin, Round 3, Mexico, 2013–14 UCI Track Cycling World Cup
3rd Keirin, British National Track Championships
1st Team Sprint, British National Track Championships

2015
1st Sprint, British National Track Championships
2nd Keirin, British National Track Championships

2016
3rd Keirin, Round 1, Glasgow, 2016–17 UCI Track Cycling World Cup
6th Keirin, Round 2, Apeldoorn, Holland. (DQ'd from 2nd), 2016–17 UCI Track Cycling World Cup

2017
4th Keirin, Round 3, Los Angeles, 2016–17 UCI Track Cycling World Cup
1st Keirin, National Championships, Manchester
3rd Sprint, National Championships, Manchester
3rd Team sprint, National Championships, Manchester
2nd Keirin, Round 3, Milton, Ontario 2017-18 UCI Track Cycling World Cup
7th Sprint, Round 3, Milton, Ontario 2017-18 UCI Track Cycling World Cup
8th Keirin, Round 4, Santiago, Chile 2017-18 UCI Track Cycling World Cup

2018
2nd Keirin, Commonwealth Games, Gold Coast
3rd Keirin, Round 5, Minsk, Belarus 2017-18 UCI Track Cycling World Cup
6th Sprint, Round 5, Minsk, Belarus 2017-18 UCI Track Cycling World Cup
1st Keirin, National Championships, Manchester
2nd Sprint, National Championships, Manchester

Finished season ranked 3rd in the world overall (UCI world cup rankings- sprint) Finished season ranked 3rd in the world overall (UCI world cup rankings- keirin)
