= 2008 UCI Track Cycling World Championships – Men's team pursuit =

Men's team pursuit at the 2008 UCI Track Cycling World Championships
- Venue: Manchester Velodrome, Manchester
- Date: 27 March 2008

The Men's team pursuit event of the 2008 UCI Track Cycling World Championships was held on 27 March 2008.

== Results ==
=== Qualifying ===
Rank	Name	Nation	1000 m	2000 m	3000 m	Time	Speed (km/h)	
1	Michael Faerk Christensen; Casper Jorgensen; Jens-Erik Madsen; Alex Rasmussen	Denmark	1:03.778 (2)	2:01.406 (1)	2:59.517 (1)	03:57.734	60.571	Q
2	Ed Clancy; Geraint Thomas; Paul Manning; Bradley Wiggins	United Kingdom	1:03.523 (1)	2:01.503 (2)	2:59.891 (2)	03:58.983	60.255	Q
3	Sam Bewley; Westley Gough; Hayden Roulston; Marc Ryan	New Zealand	1:05.334 (6)	2:04.136 (5)	3:02.633 (4)	04:00.833	59.792	q
4	Jack Bobridge; Graeme Brown; Mark Jamieson; Bradley McGee	Australia	1:03.875 (3)	2:02.334 (3)	3:01.597 (3)	04:00.947	59.764	q
5	Mikhail Ignatiev; Alexei Markov; Alexander Petrovskiy; Alexander Serov	Russia	1:05.420 (7)	2:04.535 (6)	3:04.100 (5)	04:04.310	58.941	
6	Damien Gaudin; Matthieu Ladagnous; Nicolas Rousseau; Fabien Sanchez	France	1:05.532 (8)	2:05.102 (7)	3:04.572 (6)	04:04.577	58.877	
7	Sergi Escobar Roure; David Muntaner Juaneda; Antonio Tauler Llull; Asier Maeztu Billelabeitia	Spain	1:06.118 (9)	2:05.651 (10)	3:05.170 (8)	04:05.138	58.742	
8	Levi Heimans; Jenning Huizenga; Jens Mouris; Peter Schep	Netherlands	1:06.712 (11)	2:06.334 (11)	3:05.539 (9)	04:05.302	58.703	
9	Robert Bartko; Daniel Becke; Henning Bommel; Patrick Gretsch	Germany	1:05.146 (5)	2:05.202 (8)	3:05.764 (11)	04:06.941	58.313	
10	Lyubomyr Polatayko; Maksym Polischuk; Vitaliy Popkov; Vitaliy Shchedov	Ukraine	1:04.801 (4)	2:03.887 (4)	3:04.819 (7)	04:07.086	58.279	
11	Carlos Alzate; Juan Esteban Arango; Arles Castro; Jairo Pérez	Colombia	1:06.170 (10)	2:05.610 (9)	3:05.609 (10)	04:09.960	57.609	
12	Jong Gyun Choi; Sun Jae Jang; Jae Wan Jung; Dong Hun Kim	South Korea	1:08.517 (12)	2:11.642 (12)	3:13.220 (12)	04:14.157	56.657	

=== Finals ===
Rank	Name	Nation	1000 m	2000 m	3000 m	Time	Speed (km/h)
Bronze medal race
3rd place, bronze medalist(s)	Luke Roberts; Graeme Brown; Mark Jamieson; Bradley McGee	Australia	1:03.942 (1)	2:01.728 (1)	2:59.937 (1)	04:00.089	59.977
4	Sam Bewley; Westley Gough; Hayden Roulston; Marc Ryan	New Zealand	1:04.855 (2)	2:03.719 (2)	3:02.642 (2)	04:01.993	59.505
Gold medal race
1st place, gold medalist(s)	Ed Clancy; Geraint Thomas; Paul Manning; Bradley Wiggins	United Kingdom	1:03.628 (1)	2:01.217 (1)	2:58.809 (1)	03:56.322 WR	60.933
2nd place, silver medalist(s)	Michael Faerk Christensen; Casper Jorgensen; Jens-Erik Madsen; Alex Rasmussen	Denmark	1:04.155 (2)	2:02.379 (2)	3:01.034 (2)	03:59.381	60.155
