= Vasilijus Lendel =

Lithuanian cyclist (born 1995)

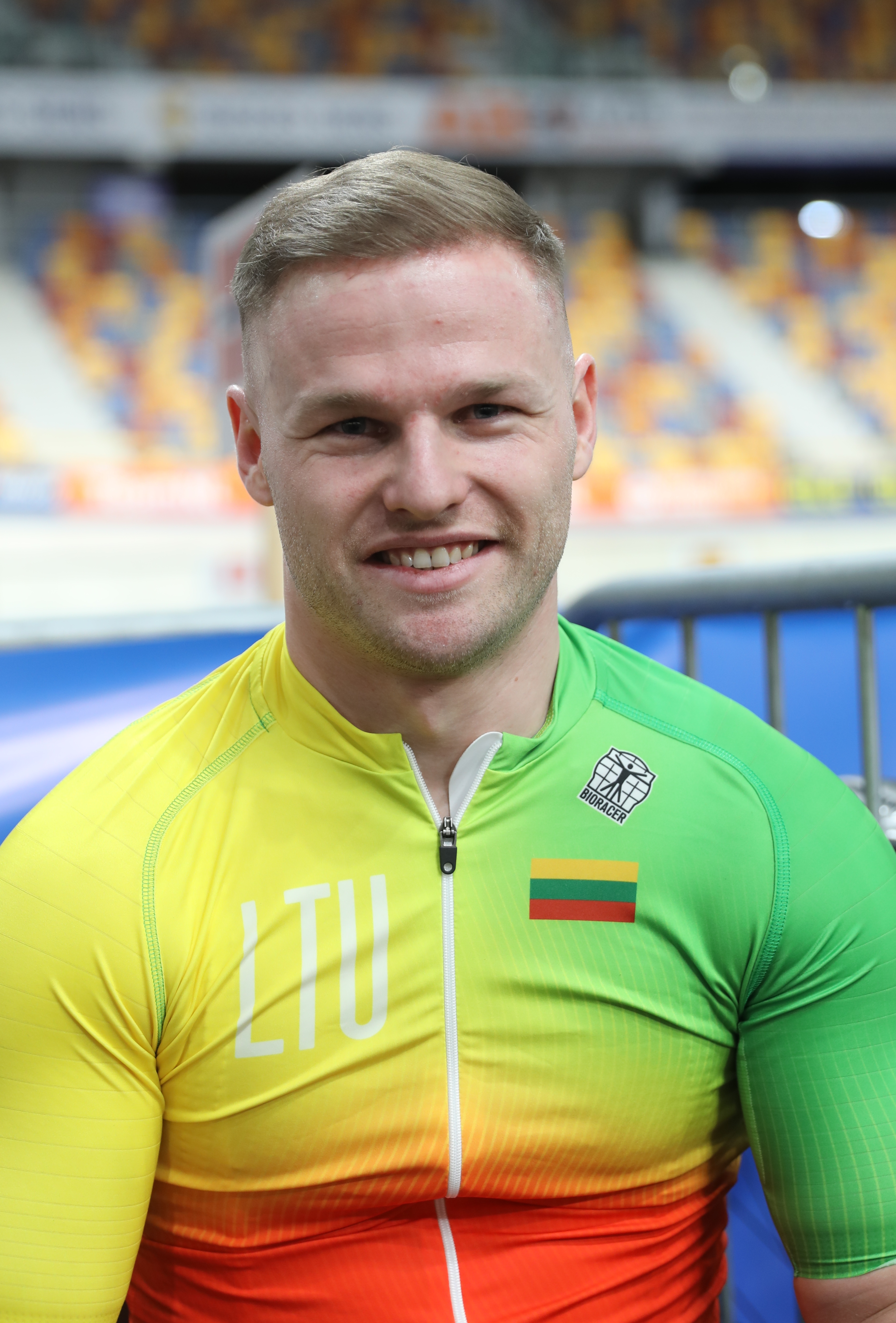
- Lendel in 2024

Personal information
- Born: 9 April 1995 (age 31)

Cycling career
- Sport: Cycling
- Discipline: Track cycling
Medal record
Men's track cycling
Representing Lithuania
European Championships
Bronze medal – third place	2020 Plovdiv	Sprint
U23 & Junior European Championships
Bronze medal – third place	2016 Montichiari	U23 Sprint

Vasilijus Lendel (born 9 April 1995) is a Lithuanian male track cyclist, representing Lithuania at international competitions. He competed at the 2014 UEC European Track Championships and 2015 UEC European Track Championships in the sprint and keirin event. He won the silver medal at the 2016–17 UCI Track Cycling World Cup, Round 1 in Glasgow in the keirin.

== Career ==
In 2020 Lendel was awarded Lithuanian Cycling Federation title for Lithuanian male cyclist of the year. In 2021 Lendel won the title of Lithuanian male cyclist of the year again.

== Major results ==
2016
(silver) Keirin, 2016–17 UCI Track Cycling World Cup, Round 1 in Glasgow
(bronze) Individual Sprint, UEC European U23 Track Championships

2017
(gold) Individual Sprint, 2017–18 UCI Track Cycling World Cup, Round 4 in Santiago
(silver) Individual Sprint, 2017–18 UCI Track Cycling World Cup, Round 5 in Minsk

2020
(gold) Individual Sprint, 2020 Baltic Track Cycling Championships
(gold) Keirin, 2020 Baltic Track Cycling Championships
(gold) Team Sprint, 2020 Baltic Track Cycling Championships
(bronze) Individual Sprint, UEC European Track Championships

== See also ==
- List of European Championship medalists in men's sprint
- List of Track Cycling Nations Cup medalists
