= 2010 UCI Track Cycling World Championships – Men's scratch =

Rainbow jersey

The Men's Scratch was one of the 10 men's events at the 2010 UCI Track Cycling World Championships, held in Ballerup, Denmark on 25 March 2010.

24 Cyclists participated in the contest. The competition consisted of 60 laps, making a total of 15 km.

== Results ==
| Rank | Name | Nation | Laps Down |
|---|---|---|---|
| 1st place, gold medalist(s) | Alex Rasmussen | Denmark | |
| 2nd place, silver medalist(s) | Juan Esteban Arango | Colombia | |
| 3rd place, bronze medalist(s) | Kazuhiro Mori | Japan | |
| 4 | Martin Bláha | Czech Republic | -1 |
| 5 | Chris Newton | Great Britain | -1 |
| 6 | Mykhaylo Radionov | Ukraine | -1 |
| 7 | Thomas Scully | New Zealand | -1 |
| 8 | Kwok Ho Ting | Hong Kong | -1 |
| 9 | Morgan Kneisky | France | -1 |
| 10 | Erik Mohs | Germany | -1 |
| 11 | Zachary Bell | Canada | -1 |
| 12 | Tim Mertens | Belgium | -1 |
| 13 | Neofytos Sakellaridis-Mangouras | Greece | -1 |
| 14 | Viktor Shmalko | Russia | -1 |
| 15 | Elia Viviani | Italy | -1 |
| 16 | Pablo Seisdedos | Chile | -1 |
| 17 | Lukasz Bujko | Poland | -1 |
| 18 | Daniel Holloway | United States | -1 |
| 19 | Travis Meyer | Australia | -1 |
| 20 | Franco Marvulli | Switzerland | -1 |
| 21 | Werner Riebenbauer | Austria | -1 |
| 22 | Matt Brammeier | Ireland | -1 |
| DNF | Ángel Colla | Argentina | -1 |
| DNF | Alexey Kolessov | Kazakhstan | -1 |
