= Alex Rasmussen =

Danish racing cyclist

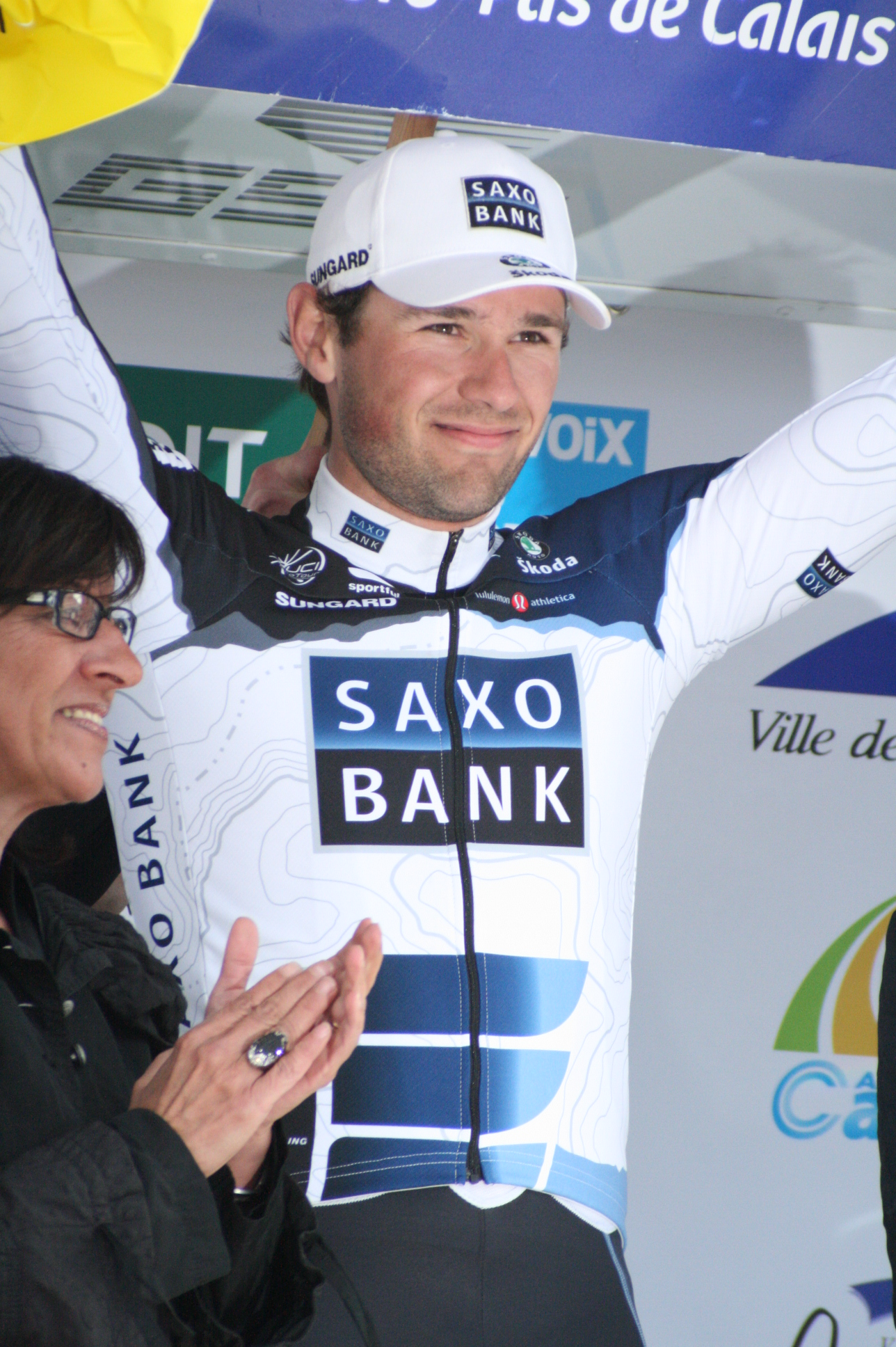
- Rasmussen at the 2010 Four Days of Dunkirk

Personal information
- Full name: Alex Nicki Rasmussen
- Born: 9 June 1984 (age 42) Svendborg, Southern Denmark, Denmark
- Height: 1.86 m (6 ft 1 in)
- Weight: 88 kg (194 lb)

Cycling career
- Sport: Cycling
- Current team: Retired
- Disciplines: Road; Track
- Role: Rider
- Rider type: Time trialist

Amateur teams
- 2007: Odense Energi
- 2008: Team Designa Køkken

Professional teams
- 2009–2010: Team Saxo Bank
- 2011: HTC–Highroad
- 2012–2013: Garmin–Barracuda
- 2014: Riwal Cycling Team
- 2015: Team TreFor–Blue Water
- 2016: Team ColoQuick–Cult

Major wins
- Road Grand Tours Giro d'Italia 2 TTT stages (2011, 2012) One-day races and Classics National Road Race Championships (2007) Track World Championships Madison (2009) Scratch (2005, 2010) Team pursuit (2009)
Medal record
Representing Denmark
Men's track cycling
Olympic Games
Silver medal – second place	2008 Beijing	Team pursuit
World Championships
Gold medal – first place	2005 Los Angeles	Scratch
Gold medal – first place	2009 Pruszków	Madison
Gold medal – first place	2009 Pruszków	Team pursuit
Gold medal – first place	2010 Ballerup	Scratch
Silver medal – second place	2008 Manchester	Team pursuit
Silver medal – second place	2014 Cali	Team Pursuit
Bronze medal – third place	2007 Palma de Mallorca	Team pursuit
Bronze medal – third place	2008 Manchester	Madison

Alex Nicki Rasmussen (born 9 June 1984) is a Danish former professional racing cyclist, who rode professionally between 2009 and 2016 for the Team Saxo Bank, HTC–Highroad, Garmin–Sharp, Riwal Cycling Team, Team TreFor–Blue Water and Team ColoQuick–Cult teams. Primarily specialising in track cycling, Rasmussen was also proficient in road racing, winning the Danish National Road Race Championships in 2007.

== Career ==
He was the 2005 Scratch World Champion. Together with Michael Mørkøv, Rasmussen won the Danish Madison Championships six times in a row, and as such, are nicknamed the 'Par nummer syv' (Pair number seven).

On 15 September 2011, his contract with HTC–Highroad was terminated for missing a doping control, at which time the team was made aware of two previous controls he had missed before he joined them. Rasmussen was also removed from the Danish UCI Championships team, and faced criminal prosecution. However, on 17 November, Rasmussen was cleared of the charges due to a procedural error on the part of the UCI. His previously signed contract with Garmin–Barracuda for the 2012 season, nullified upon news of the whereabouts violations, was again honored. The UCI appealed this decision to the Court of Arbitration for Sport in December 2011, with the original decision being overturned on 4 July 2012. As a result, Rasmussen was given a backdated 18-month ban, meaning that he would be suspended until April 2013. His contract with the renamed Garmin–Sharp squad was also terminated.

On 19 March 2013, Garmin–Sharp re-signed Rasmussen for the remainder of the 2013 season. Rasmussen left Garmin–Sharp following the 2013 season, and subsequently announced plans to re-enter track cycling. Rasmussen joined Riwal Cycling Team for the 2014 season.

== Major results ==
=== Road ===
2006
National Under-23 Championships

1st Time trial
3rd Road race

1st Overall Tour de Berlin

1st Stages 2 & 3 (ITT)

3rd GP Herning
9th Time trial, UEC European Under-23 Championships
2007
1st Road race, National Championships
2nd Colliers Classic
5th Overall Tour de Bretagne
6th Overall Boucles de la Mayenne

1st Points classification

2008
Tour of Qinghai Lake

1st Points classification
1st Prologue, Stages 1, 3 & 9

1st Stage 3 Ronde de l'Oise
3rd Rogaland GP
4th Duo Normand (with Jens-Erik Madsen)
2009
2nd Time trial, National Championships
4th Giro del Capo Challenge 4
4th Profronde van Fryslan
2010
1st GP Herning
Four Days of Dunkirk

1st Stages 1 & 3

1st Stage 4 (ITT) Vuelta a Andalucía
2nd Time trial, National Championships
10th Designa Grand Prix
2011
1st Philadelphia International Championship
1st Stage 1 (TTT) Giro d'Italia
4th Time trial, National Championships
2012
1st Stage 4 (TTT) Giro d'Italia
2nd Grand Prix de Denain
2013
1st Stage 1 Bayern–Rundfahrt
4th Time trial, National Championships
2014
Dookoła Mazowsza

1st Stages 3 & 4

2nd Skive–Løbet

==== Grand Tour general classification results timeline ====
Grand Tour	2011	2012	2013
Giro d'Italia	153	150	—
Tour de France	—	—	—
Vuelta a España	—	—	134

Legend
—	Did not compete
DNF	Did not finish

=== Track ===
2001
National Championships

1st Kilo
1st Team pursuit

National Junior Championships

1st Kilo
1st Sprint
1st Team pursuit

2002
1st Kilo, National Championships
National Junior Championships

1st Kilo
1st Points race
1st Sprint
1st Team pursuit

3rd Scratch, UCI World Junior Championships
2003
National Championships

1st Kilo
1st Team pursuit

1st Individual pursuit, National Under-23 Championships
3rd Scratch, UEC European Under-23 Championships
2004
UEC European Under-23 Championships

1st Scratch
2nd Madison (with Michael Berling)

National Championships

1st Individual pursuit
1st Kilo
1st Madison (with Michael Berling)
1st Team pursuit

1st Individual pursuit, National Under-23 Championships
2005
1st Scratch, UCI World Championships
UEC European Under-23 Championships

1st Madison (with Michael Mørkøv)
1st Scratch

National Championships

1st Individual pursuit
1st Kilo
1st Madison (with Michael Berling)
1st Points race
1st Team pursuit

1st Individual pursuit, National Under-23 Championships
2006
National Championships

1st Individual pursuit
1st Kilo
1st Madison (with Michael Mørkøv)
1st Team pursuit

2007
National Championships

1st Individual pursuit
1st Madison (with Michael Mørkøv)
1st Points race
1st Team pursuit

1st Six Days of Grenoble (with Michael Mørkøv)
2nd Six Days of Copenhagen (with Michael Mørkøv)
3rd Team pursuit, UCI World Championships
2008
National Championships

1st Individual pursuit
1st Madison (with Michael Mørkøv)

1st Six Days of Grenoble (with Michael Mørkøv)
2nd Team pursuit, Summer Olympics
UCI World Championships

2nd Team pursuit
3rd Madison

2nd Six Days of Copenhagen (with Michael Mørkøv)
2009
UCI World Championships

1st Team pursuit
1st Madison (with Michael Mørkøv)

1st Madison, National Championships (with Michael Mørkøv)
1st Six Days of Ghent (with Michael Mørkøv)
1st Six Days of Copenhagen (with Michael Mørkøv)
2010
1st Scratch, UCI World Championships
1st Madison, National Championships (with Michael Mørkøv)
1st Six Days of Copenhagen (with Michael Mørkøv)
3rd Six Days of Ghent (with Michael Mørkøv)
3rd Six Days of Rotterdam (with Michael Mørkøv)
2011
1st Six Days of Copenhagen (with Michael Mørkøv)
2012
2nd Six Days of Copenhagen (with Michael Mørkøv)
2014
2nd Team pursuit, UCI World Championships
2nd Six Days of Copenhagen (with Michael Mørkøv)
3rd Six Days of Rotterdam (with Michael Mørkøv)
2015
1st Six Days of Copenhagen (with Michael Mørkøv)
2nd Six Days of Rotterdam (with Michael Mørkøv)
2016
1st Six Days of Copenhagen (with Jesper Mørkøv)
