= 2012 UCI Track Cycling World Championships – Men's points race =

Rainbow jersey

The Men's points race at the 2012 UCI Track Cycling World Championships was held on April 7. 20 athletes participated in the contest.

== Medalists ==
Gold	Cameron Meyer (AUS)
Silver	Ben Swift (GBR)
Bronze	Kenny De Ketele (BEL)

== Results ==
The race was held at 21:30.

Rank	Name	Nation	Sprint points	Lap points	Total points
1st place, gold medalist(s)	Cameron Meyer	Australia	13	20	33
2nd place, silver medalist(s)	Ben Swift	Great Britain	32	0	32
3rd place, bronze medalist(s)	Kenny De Ketele	Belgium	30	0	30
4	Aaron Gate	New Zealand	8	20	28
5	Unai Elorriaga Zubiaur	Spain	24	0	24
6	Angelo Ciccone	Italy	19	0	19
7	Rafał Ratajczyk	Poland	10	0	10
8	Milan Kadlec	Czech Republic	6	0	6
9	Silvan Dillier	Switzerland	6	0	6
10	Vladimir Tuychiev	Uzbekistan	4	0	4
11	Kwok Ho Ting	Hong Kong	3	0	3
12	Andreas Graf	Austria	2	0	2
13	Luis Sepúlveda	Chile	1	0	1
14	Peter Schep	Netherlands	1	0	1
15	Jakob Steigmiller	Germany	1	0	1
16	Vivien Brisse	France	11	−20	−9
17	Yousif Al-Hammadi	United Arab Emirates	0	−20	−20
–	Choi Seung-Woo	South Korea	3	−20	DNF
–	Ivan Savitsky	Russia	0	−20	DNF
–	Hariff Salleh	Malaysia	0	0	DNF
