= 2020 Baltic Track Cycling Championships =

- Venue: Cido Arena
- Location: Panevėžys, Lithuania
- Date: February 8-9

The 2020 Baltic Track Cycling Championships were held in Panevėžys, Lithuania on 8-9 of February 2020. Cyclists from Lithuania, Latvia and Estonia competed for the Baltic champions title.

== Medallists ==
=== Men's ===
Event	Gold	Silver	Bronze
Sprint	Vasilijus Lendel; Lithuania	Svajūnas Jonauskas; Lithuania	Ainārs Ķiksis; Latvia
Keirin	Vasilijus Lendel; Lithuania	Svajūnas Jonauskas; Lithuania	Ainārs Ķiksis; Latvia
Points Race	Daniels Kazis; Latvia	Gediminas Kaupas; Lithuania	Žygimantas Norutis; Lithuania
Scratch	Daniels Kazis; Latvia	Kristers Ansons; Latvia	Mantas Bitinis; Lithuania
Omnium	Rat Arm; Estonia	Pauls Rubenis; Latvia	Kristers Ansons; Latvia
Team Sprint	(Lithuania) El-Eko Sport; Vasilijus Lendel; Svajūnas Jonauskas; Gėdvinas Serafinas	(Lithuania) DSK Vitus; Žygimantas Matuzevičius; Žygimantas Norutis; Eitvilas Aželis	(Lithuania) Colibri Cycling Team; Arminas Bagdonas; Mantas Bitinis; Airidas Videika

=== Women's ===
Event	Gold	Silver	Bronze
Sprint	Simona Krupeckaitė; Lithuania	Miglė Marozaitė; Lithuania	Olivija Baleišytė; Lithuania
Keirin	Simona Krupeckaitė; Lithuania	Miglė Marozaitė; Lithuania	Olivija Baleišytė; Lithuania
Points Race	Viktorija Šumskytė; Lithuania	Kristel Sandra Soonik; Estonia	Līna Svarinska; Latvia
Scratch	Miglė Marozaitė; Lithuania	Olivija Baleišytė; Lithuania	Viktorija Šumskytė; Lithuania
Omnium	Olivija Baleišytė; Lithuania	Viktorija Šumskytė; Lithuania	Līna Svarinska; Latvia
Team Sprint	(Lithuania) El-Eko Sport; Miglė Marozaitė; Simona Krupeckaitė	(Lithuania) Fortūna; Paulina Patinskaitė; Gabija Rukaitė	(Estonia) Viljandi Rattaklub; Kristel Sandra Soonik; Elina Tasane

== Medal table ==
* Host nation (Lithuania)

Rank	Nation	Gold	Silver	Bronze	Total
1	Lithuania*	9	9	6	24
2	Latvia	2	2	5	9
3	Estonia	1	1	1	3
Totals (3 entries)		12	12	12	36
