= 2009 UCI Track Cycling World Championships – Men's points race =

Men's points race at the 2009 UCI Track Cycling World Championships
- Venue: BGŻ Arena, Pruszków
- Date: 25 March 2009

The Men's points race event of the 2009 UCI Track Cycling World Championships was held on 25 March 2009.

== Results ==
Rank	Name	Nation	S1	S2	S3	S4	S5	S6	S7	S8	S9	S10	S11	S12	S13	S14	S15	S16	Laps	Points
1	Cameron Meyer	Australia	1								5			5	5	3	5			24
2	Daniel Kreutzfeldt	Denmark			5	1				5			3			5	3			22
3	Chris Newton	United Kingdom	3	5	1						2	3	2	2		1		2		21
4	Eloy Teruel Rovira	Spain			2			5	5		3		1	1						17
5	Vasili Kiryienka	Belarus		1		3						5			1			5		15
6	Colby Pearce	United States				5				1		2		3	3					14
7	Roger Kluge	Germany	5				5								2		1			13
8	Kam Po Wong	Hong Kong			3								5							8
9	Zachary Bell	Canada	2			2										2				6
10	Milan Kadlec	Czech Republic					3			3										6
11	Kazuhiro Mori	Japan					2			2		1								5
12	Kenny De Ketele	Belgium						3	2											5
13	Morgan Kneisky	France																3		3
14	Martin Garrido Myorga	Argentina															2	1		3
15	Volodymyr Rybin	Ukraine					1	1	1											3
16	Juan Esteban Arango	Colombia		2																2
17	Alexander Äschbach	Switzerland									1									1
18	Elia Viviani	Italy																	-20	-20
19	Pim Ligthart	Netherlands																	-20	-20
20	Joon Yong Seo	South Korea						2	3										-40	-35
21	Alexey Lyalko	Kazakhstan																	-40	-40
22	Andreas Graf	Austria																	-40	-40
DNF	Rafał Ratajczyk	Poland		3															-20	-17
DNF	Leonid Krasnov	Russia																	-20	-20
