= Dimitrios Polydoropoulos =

Greek cyclist (born 1989)

Personal information
- Born: 31 March 1989 (age 37) Athens, Greece

Cycling career
- Sport: Cycling
- Discipline: Track cycling
- Role: Rider
- Rider type: team pursuit

Dimitrios Polydoropoulos (born 31 March 1989) is a Greek male track cyclist. He competed in the team pursuit event at the 2010 and 2011 UCI Track Cycling World Championships.
