= Bayley Simpson =

Canadian cyclist

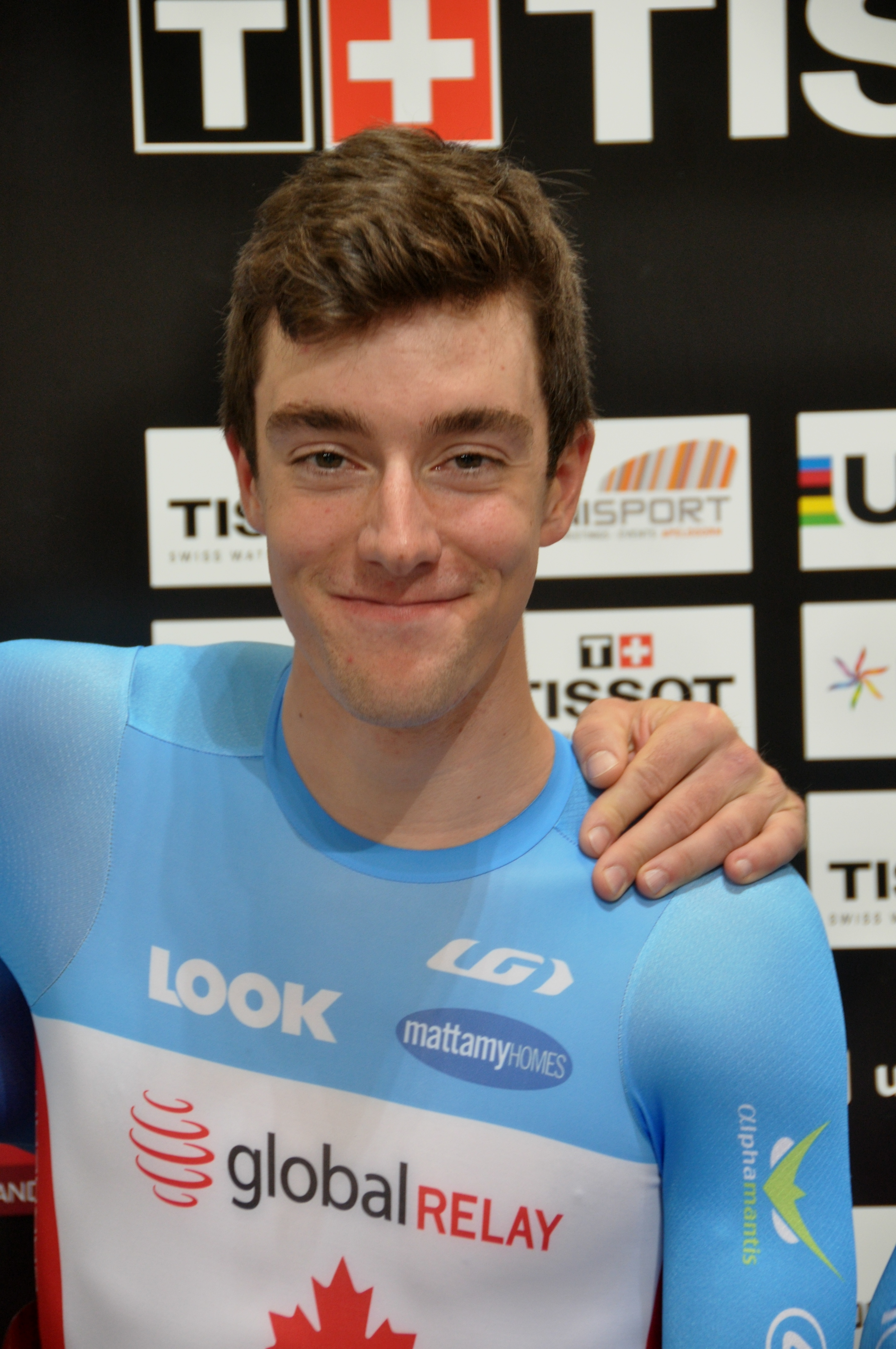
- Simpson in 2016

Personal information
- Born: 9 December 1997 (age 28)

Cycling career
- Sport: Cycling
- Current team: McMaster KG
- Discipline: Track cycling
Medal record
Men's track cycling
Representing Canada
Pan American Championships
Gold medal – first place	2017 Couva	Team pursuit

Bayley Simpson (born 9 December 1997) is a Canadian male track cyclist, representing Canada at international competitions. He won the gold medal at the 2016–17 UCI Track Cycling World Cup in Apeldoorn in the team pursuit. He currently studies kinesiology at McMaster University.
