= Han Jun (track cyclist) =

Chinese track cyclist (born 1990)

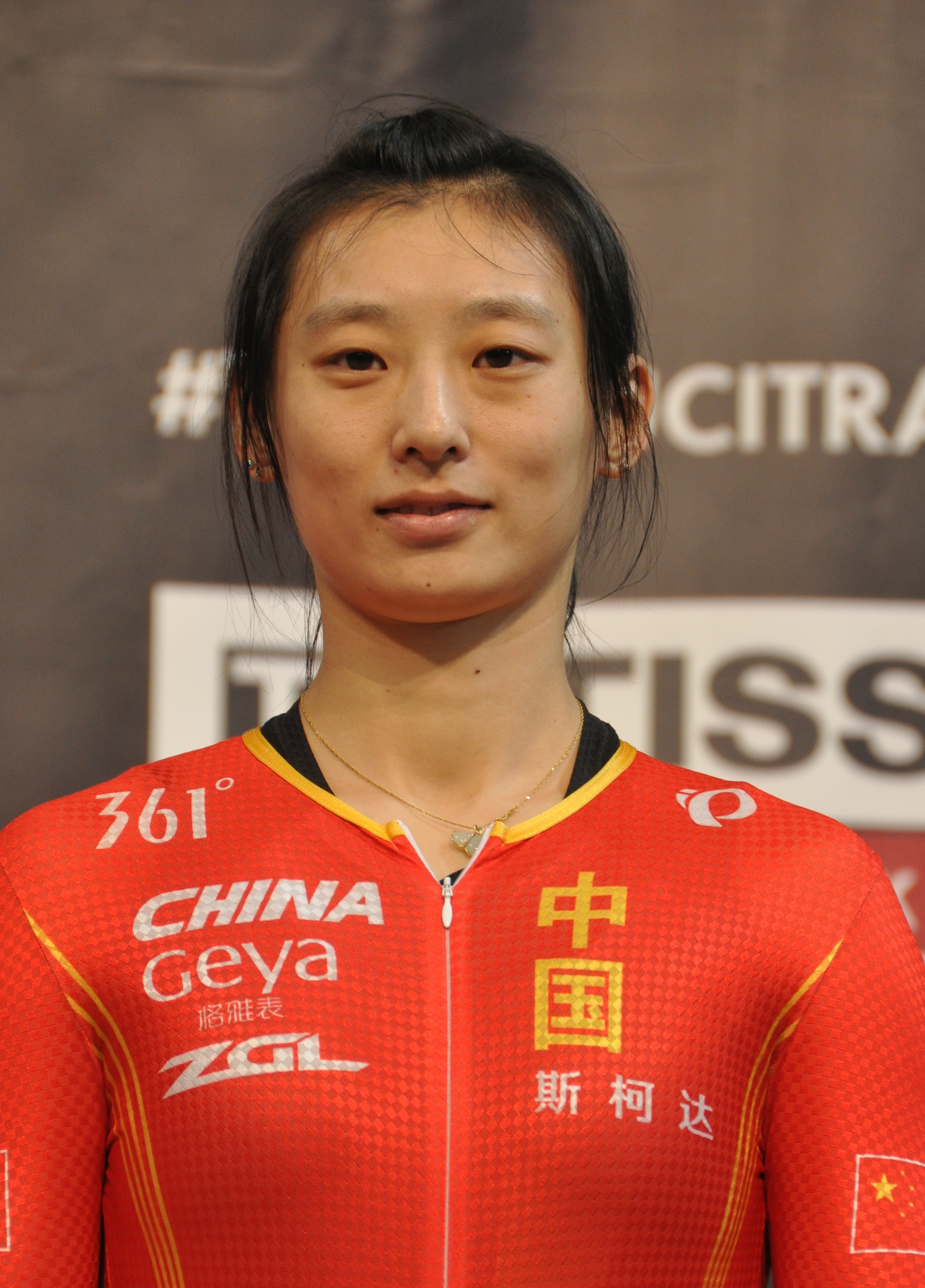
- Han Jun in 2016

Personal information
- Born: 9 February 1990 (age 36)

Cycling career
- Sport: Cycling
- Discipline: Track cycling

Han Jun (born 9 February 1990) is a Chinese female track cyclist, representing China at international competitions. During the 2016–17 UCI Track Cycling World Cup she won in the team sprint at round one in Glasgow the silver medal in at round two in Apeldoorn the bronze medal.

== Career results ==
2014
Hong Kong International Track Cup

2nd 500m Time Trial
3rd Keirin

China Track Cup

2nd Keirin
3rd Sprint

2016
Japan Track Cup

1st Keirin
2nd Sprint
2nd Keirin

China Track Cup

1st Sprint
1st Keirin
