= Adam Jamieson =

Canadian cyclist

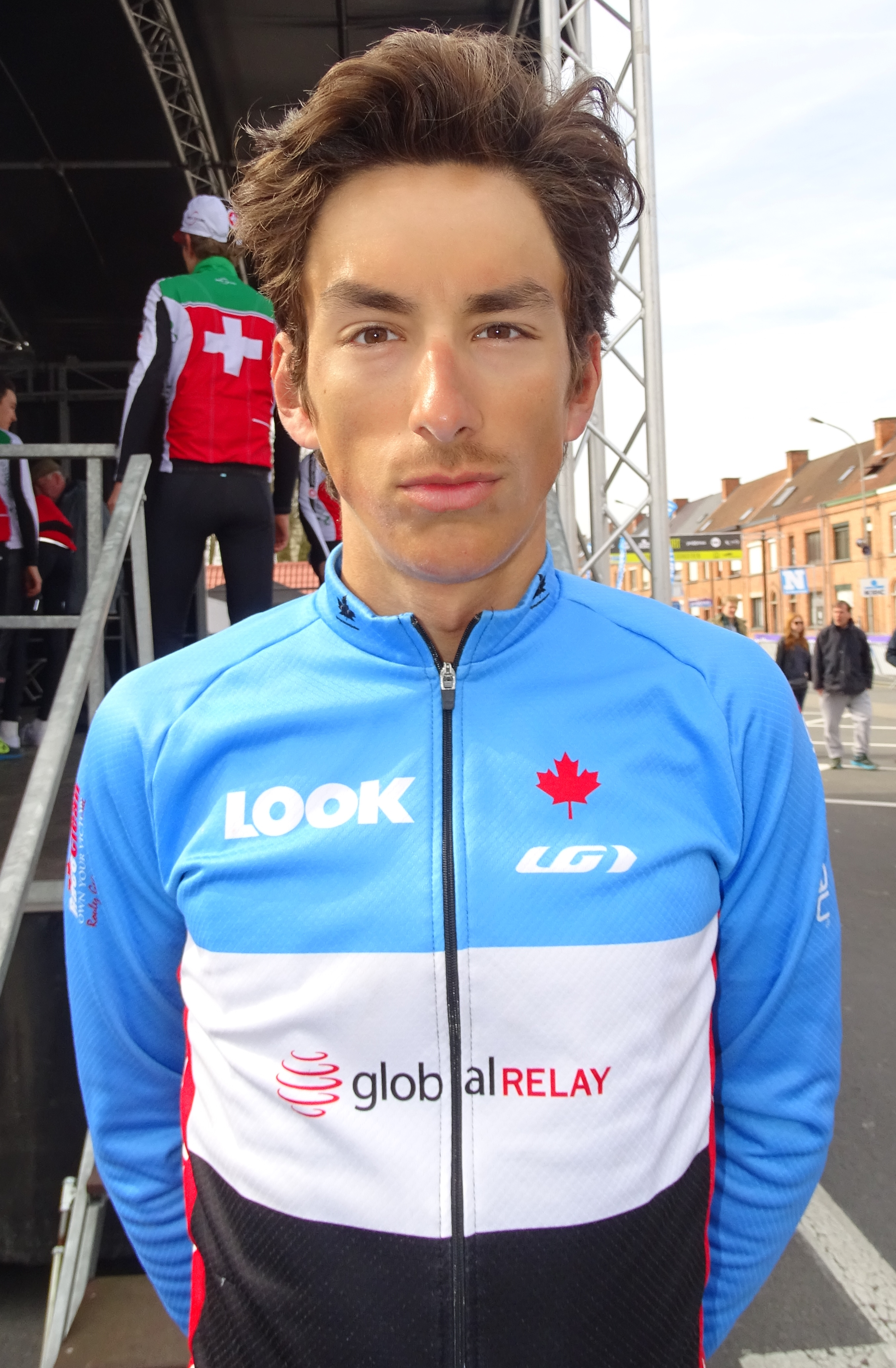
- Jamieson in 2016

Personal information
- Full name: Adam Jamieson
- Born: 12 February 1996 (age 30) Barrie, Ontario, Canada
- Height: 1.87 m (6 ft 2 in)
- Weight: 75 kg (165 lb)

Cycling career
- Sport: Cycling
- Disciplines: Track; Road
- Role: Rider

Amateur teams
- 2015: NCCH-DEC Express
- 2016: RaceClean

Professional teams
- 2017: An Post–Chain Reaction
- 2018: Silber Pro Cycling Team
- 2021: XSpeed United Continental
Medal record
Representing Canada
Men's track cycling
Pan American Games
Bronze medal – third place	2015 Toronto	Team pursuit
Commonwealth Games
Bronze medal – third place	2018 Gold Coast	Team pursuit
Pan American Championships
Silver medal – second place	2016 Aguascalientes	Team pursuit

Adam Jamieson (born 12 February 1996) is a Canadian professional racing cyclist, who last rode for UCI Continental team XSpeed United Continental. He rode in the men's team pursuit at the 2016 UCI Track Cycling World Championships. He also won a bronze medal at the 2015 Pan American Games in Toronto in the team pursuit event.

== Major results ==
=== Road ===
2012
3rd Time trial, National Junior Road Championships
2013
7th Overall Le Trophée Centre Morbihan

1st Young rider classification

2015
3rd Overall Green Mountain Stage Race
2016
6th Grand Prix des Marbriers
2017
Challenge du Prince

4th Trophée Princier
10th Trophée de l'Anniversaire

Les Challenges de la Marche Verte

10th GP Oued Eddahab
10th GP Sakia El Hamra

=== Track ===
2016
2016–17 UCI World Cup

1st Team pursuit – Apeldoorn (with Jay Lamoureux, Aidan Caves, Bayley Simpson & Ed Veal)

2nd Team pursuit, Pan American Championships
2017
1st Team pursuit (with Bayley Simpson, Evan Burtnik & Derek Gee), National Championships
2018
1st Team pursuit (with Michael Foley, Evan Burtnik & Derek Gee), National Championships
