= Stephen Barrett (cyclist) =

Irish track cyclist

Personal information
- Born: 19 April 1985 (age 41)

Cycling career
- Sport: Cycling
- Discipline: Track cycling
- Role: Rider
- Rider type: endurance

Stephen Barrett (born 19 April 1985) is an Irish male track cyclist, riding for the national team. He competed in the team pursuit event at the 2010 UCI Track Cycling World Championships.
