= Dimitrios Chidemenakis =

Greek cyclist (born 1991)

Personal information
- Born: 7 October 1991 (age 35) Chánia

Cycling career
- Sport: Cycling
- Discipline: Track cycling
- Role: Rider

Dimitrios Chidemenakis (born 7 October 1991, in Chánia) is a Greek male track cyclist, riding for the national team. He competed in the team pursuit event at the 2010 UCI Track Cycling World Championships.
