= Casper Jørgensen =

Danish cyclist (born 1985)

Personal information
- Full name: Casper Jørgensen
- Born: 20 August 1985 (age 41)

Cycling career
- Sport: Cycling
- Current team: Retired
- Disciplines: Road and track
- Role: Rider

Professional teams
- 2007: Odense Energi
- 2008–2009: Team GLS–Pakke Shop
- 2010: Team Designa Køkken–Blue Water
Medal record
Representing Denmark
Men's track cycling
Olympic Games
Silver medal – second place	2008 Beijing	Team pursuit
World Championships
Gold medal – first place	2009 Pruszków	Team pursuit
Silver medal – second place	2008 Manchester	Team pursuit
Bronze medal – third place	2007 Palma de Mallorca	Team pursuit
European Championships
Silver medal – second place	2008 Alkmaar	Madison

Casper Jørgensen (born 20 August 1985) is a Danish retired professional racing cyclist. He was forced to retire due to a knee injury. He is the current national team coach for the Men's team pursuit.

== Major results ==
=== Road ===
2007
1st Team time trial, National Road Championships
1st Prologue GP Tell
3rd Time trial, National Under-23 Road Championships
5th Time trial, National Road Championships
2008
1st Prologue Olympia's Tour
2nd Duo Normand (with Michael Mørkøv)
2009
1st Prologue Tour du Loir-et-Cher

=== Track ===
1. 2002: 2nd in National Championship, Track, 1 km, Elite, Denmark (DEN)
2. 2002: 2nd in National Championship, Track, 1 km, Juniors, Denmark (DEN)
3. 2002: 1st in National Championship, Track, Pursuit, Juniors, Denmark (DEN)
4. 2002: 2nd in National Championship, Track, Team Pursuit, Elite, Denmark (DEN)
5. 2002: 1st in National Championship, Track, Team Pursuit, Juniors, Denmark (DEN)
6. 2002: 3rd in National Championship, Track, Points race, Juniors, Denmark (DEN)
7. 2003: 2nd in National Championship, Track, 1 km, Elite, Denmark (DEN)
8. 2003: 1st in National Championship, Track, 1 km, Juniors, Denmark (DEN)
9. 2003: 1st in National Championship, Track, Pursuit, Juniors, Denmark (DEN)
10. 2003: 1st in National Championship, Track, Team Pursuit, Elite, Denmark (DEN)
11. 2003: 1st in National Championship, Track, Team Pursuit, Juniors, Denmark (DEN)
12. 2003: 3rd in National Championship, Track, Points race, Juniors, Denmark (DEN)
13. 2004: 2nd in National Championship, Track, 1 km, Elite, Denmark (DEN)
14. 2004: 2nd in National Championship, Track, Pursuit, U23, Denmark (DEN)
15. 2004: 1st in National Championship, Track, Scratch, Elite, Denmark (DEN)
16. 2004: 1st in National Championship, Track, Team Pursuit, Elite, Denmark, Odense (DEN)
17. 2005: 2nd in National Championship, Track, 1 km, Elite, Denmark (DEN)
18. 2005: 2nd in National Championship, Track, Pursuit, Elite, Denmark (DEN)
19. 2005: 1st in National Championship, Track, Team Pursuit, Elite, Denmark (DEN)
20. 2005: 2nd in National Championship, Track, Points race, Elite, Denmark (DEN)
21. 2006: 3rd in National Championship, Track, 1 km, Elite, Denmark (DEN)
22. 2006: 2nd in National Championship, Track, Pursuit, Elite, Denmark (DEN)
23. 2006: 1st in National Championship, Track, Team Pursuit, Elite, Denmark (DEN)
24. 2006: 1st in National Championship, Track, Scratch, Elite, Denmark (DEN)
25. 2006: 1st in Sydney, Team Pursuit (AUS)
26. 2006: 2nd in Thy (DEN)
27. 2006: 3rd in UIV Cup Amsterdam, U23, Amsterdam (NED)
28. 2006: 2nd in Sydney, Team Pursuit (AUS)
29. 2007: 2nd in Los Angeles, Team Pursuit (USA)
30. 2007: 3rd in World Championship, Track, Team Pursuit, Elite, Palma de Mallorca (SPA)
31. 2007: 3rd in Herning, Herning (DEN)
32. 2007: 2nd in National Championship, Track, Pursuit, Elite, Denmark, Ballerup (DEN)
33. 2007: 1st in National Championship, Track, Team Pursuit, Elite, Denmark, Ballerup (DEN)
34. 2007: 1st in National Championship, Track, Scratch, Elite, Denmark, Ballerup (DEN)
35. 2007: 2nd in National Championship, Track, 1 km, Elite, Denmark, Ballerup (DEN)
36. 2007: 3rd in National Championship, Track, Points race, Elite, Denmark, Ballerup (DEN)
37. 2007: 3rd in UIV Cup Amsterdam, U23 (NED)
38. 2007: 2nd in National Championship, Track, Madison, Elite, Denmark, Ballerup (DEN)
39. 2008: 2nd in Los Angeles, Team Pursuit (USA)
