= Damien Corthésy =

Swiss cyclist (born 1988)

Damien Corthesy
Personal information
- Born: 24 July 1988 (age 38)

Cycling career
- Sport: Cycling
- Discipline: Track cycling
- Role: Rider

Damien Corthesy (born 24 July 1988) is a Swiss male track cyclist, riding for the national team. He competed in the team pursuit event at the 2010 UCI Track Cycling World Championships.
