= Benjamin Edelin =

French cyclist

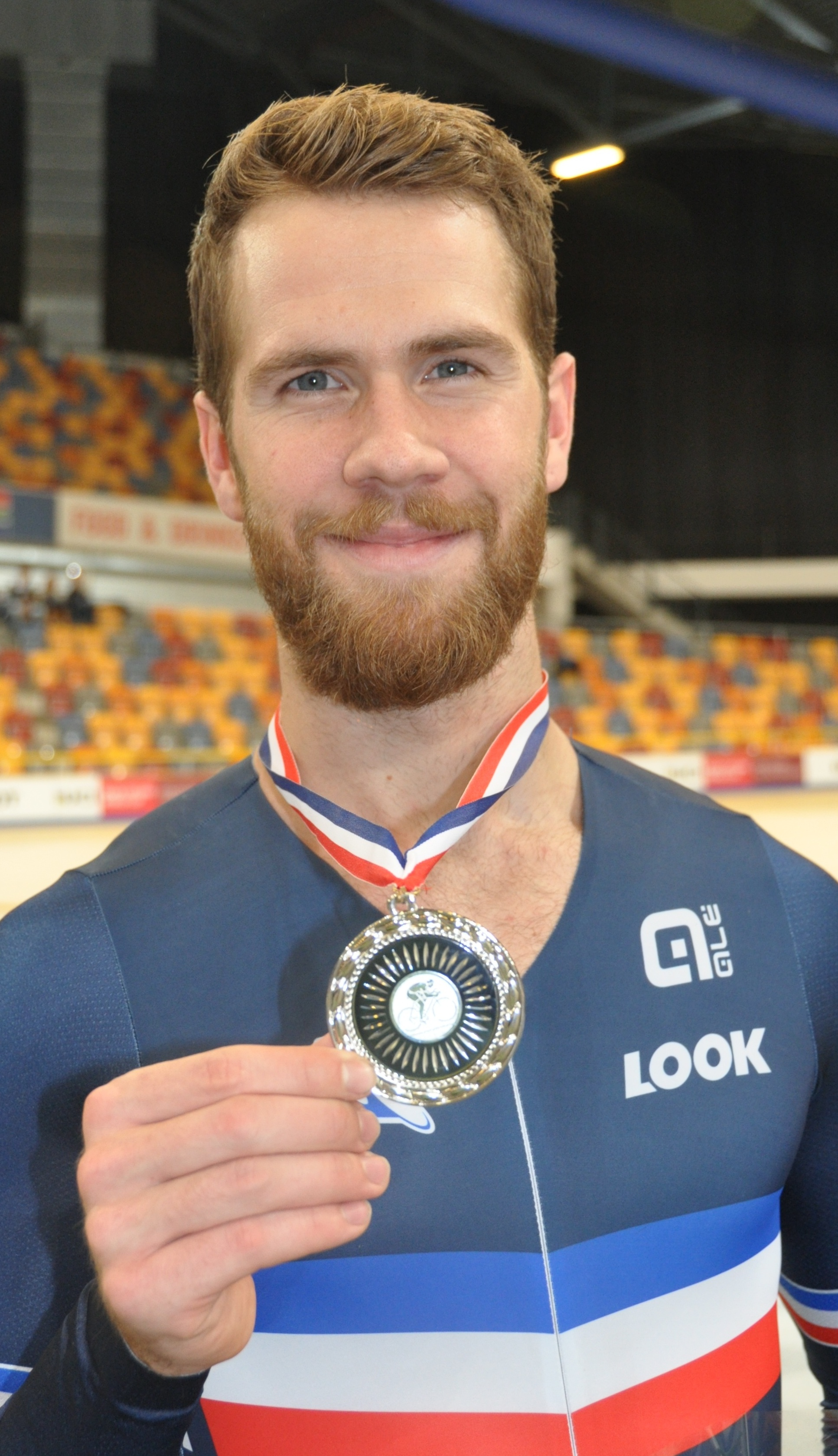
- Benjamin Edelin (2016)

Personal information
- Born: 23 February 1993 (age 33)

Cycling career
- Sport: Cycling
- Discipline: Track cycling
Medal record
Representing France
Men's track cycling
World Championships
| Bronze medal – third place | 2017 Hong Kong | Team sprint |
European Championships
| Gold medal – first place | 2017 Berlin | Team sprint |

Benjamin Edelin (born 23 February 1993) is a French male track cyclist, representing France at international competitions. He participated at the 2016 UEC European Track Championships in the 1 km time trial event.
