= Piotr Kasperkiewicz =

Polish cyclist

Personal information
- Born: 9 February 1989 (age 37)

Cycling career
- Sport: Cycling
- Discipline: Track cycling
- Role: Rider
- Rider type: endurance

Piotr Kasperkiewicz (born 9 February 1989) is a Polish male track cyclist, riding for the national team. He competed in the team pursuit event at the 2010 UCI Track Cycling World Championships.
