= Niki Byrgesen =

Danish cyclist

Personal information
- Born: 21 July 1990 (age 36)

Cycling career
- Sport: Cycling
- Discipline: Track cycling
- Role: Rider
- Rider type: team pursuit

Niki Byrgesen (born 21 July 1990) is a Danish male track cyclist. He competed in the team pursuit event at the 2010 and 2011 UCI Track Cycling World Championships.
