= Jens-Erik Madsen =

Danish cyclist (born 1981)

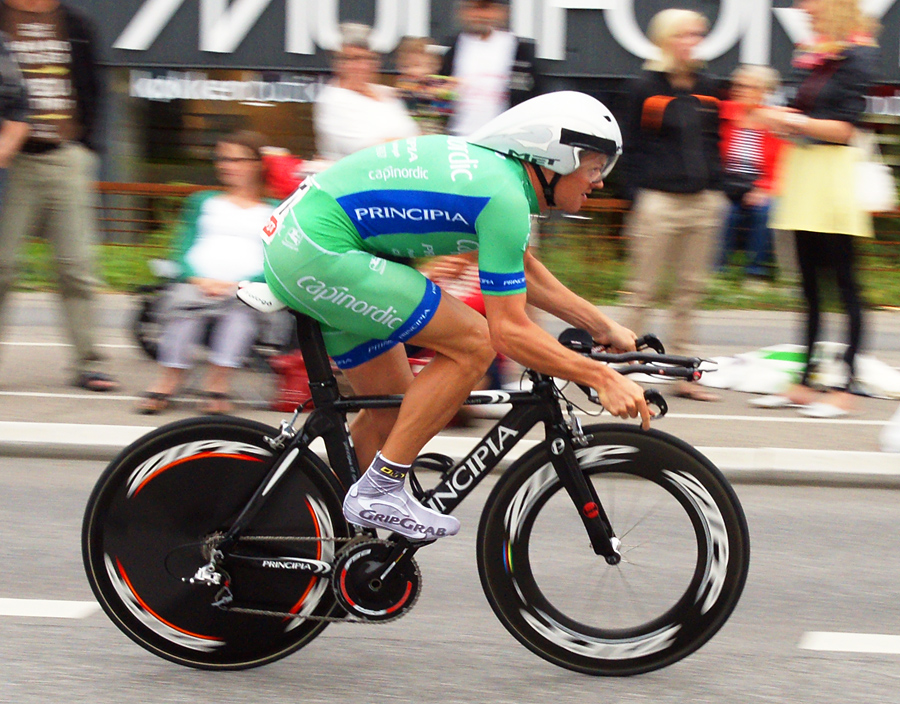
- Madsen at the 2009 Danmark Rundt

Personal information
- Full name: Jens-Erik Madsen
- Born: 30 March 1981 (age 45)

Cycling career
- Sport: Cycling
- Current team: Retired
- Disciplines: Road; Track
- Role: Rider

Professional teams
- 2004–2005: Glud & Marstrand–Horsens
- 2006–2008: Designa Køkken
- 2009: Capinordic
- 2010: Team Designa Køkken–Blue Water
- 2011: Concordia Forsikring–Himmerland
- 2012: Team TreFor
Medal record
Representing Denmark
Men's track cycling
Olympic Games
Silver medal – second place	2008 Beijing	Team pursuit
UCI World Championships
Gold medal – first place	2009 Pruszków	Team pursuit
Silver medal – second place	2008 Manchester	Team pursuit
Bronze medal – third place	2007 Palma de Mallorca	Team pursuit

Jens-Erik Madsen (born 30 March 1981) is a Danish former professional racing cyclist.

== Major results ==
1999
1st Road race, National Junior Road Championships
2000
National Track Championships

1st Team pursuit
3rd Under-23 individual pursuit

2001
3rd Team pursuit, National Track Championships
2002
National Track Championships

2nd Madison
2nd Points race
2nd Under-23 individual pursuit
3rd Individual pursuit
3rd Team pursuit

2nd Haderslev
3rd Odder
2003
1st Stage 5 Tour de Berlin
National Track Championships

2nd Under-23 individual pursuit
3rd Madison

2004
1st Time trial, National Road Championships
1st Overall Dan Bolig Cup

1st Stage 3

1st Aarhus
1st Horsens
1st Padborg/Bov CC
1st Viborg
National Track Championships

2nd Individual pursuit
2nd Madison
3rd Points race
3rd Scratch

2nd Overall Cup Danmark, Omnium
3rd Madison, UEC European Track Championships
2005
1st Overall Post Cup
1st Overall Horsens
1st GP Jægerspris
1st Sorø
1st Tønder
1st Vejle
2nd Hanstholm Post Cup
2nd Kolding
2nd Padborg/Bov CC
3rd Madison, National Track Championships
2006
1st Team pursuit, 2005–06 UCI Track Cycling World Cup Classics, Sydney
2nd Team pursuit, 2006–07 UCI Track Cycling World Cup Classics, Sydney
National Track Championships

2nd Team pursuit
3rd Individual pursuit

2nd Kronborg
2nd Tikøb
3rd Scandinavian Open Road Race
2007
1st Time trial, National Road Championships
1st Overall Cup Danmark, Omnium
1st Randers
1st Tønder
2nd Team pursuit, 2006–07 UCI Track Cycling World Cup Classics, Los Angeles
2nd Madison, National Track Championships
3rd Team pursuit, UCI Track Cycling World Championships
3rd Overall Post Cup
3rd Aarhus GP
3rd Padborg/Bov CC
2008
2nd Team pursuit, Olympic Games
2nd Team pursuit, UCI Track Cycling World Championships
Team pursuit, 2007–08 UCI Track Cycling World Cup Classics

2nd Los Angeles
2nd Copenhagen

2nd Team pursuit, 2008–09 UCI Track Cycling World Cup Classics, Manchester
2009
1st Team pursuit, UCI Track Cycling World Championships
3rd Team pursuit, 2008–09 UCI Track Cycling World Cup Classics, Copenhagen
