= Welsh Cycling =

Governing body of cycling in Wales

- Beicio Cymru (Welsh)
- Sport: Cycle racing
- Founded: 17 January 2002
- Affiliation: British Cycling
- Headquarters: Wales National Velodrome
- Location: Newport International Sports Village, Newport

Official website
- www.welshcycling.co.uk
- (Wales)

Welsh Cycling (Welsh: Beicio Cymru; formerly the Welsh Cycling Union) is the governing body of cycling in Wales. It is part of British Cycling, the national governing body of cycling in Britain. Over 140 cycling clubs in Wales are affiliated with Welsh Cycling. The governing body aims to encourage more people to cycle through inspiring, integrity and excellence; it's three core values.

Welsh Cycling administers all six cycling disciplines: BMX; cyclo-cross; mountain biking (downhill and cross-country); road racing; time trials; and track racing. The body overseas sports cycling within Wales, including the Welsh Championship series, development of Welsh riders, regional competitions and racing licences, and organises the Welsh Commonwealth Games cycling team.

Welsh Cycling's performance programme has helped develop riders who have gone onto win medals at the Commonwealth Games, World Championships, and the Olympic Games. The Wales Racing Academy is the final step of the Performance Pathway. The Academy supports riders who are competitive nationally and internationally and have demonstrated the potential to gain selection to a British Cycling Olympic/Paralympic programme, gain a contract with a professional team or to win a medal at the Commonwealth Games.

Welsh Cycling is based at the Wales National Velodrome, at the Newport International Sports Village.

Notable Welsh cyclists include Megan Barker, Rhys Britton, Rhian Edmunds, Owain Doull, Becky James and Stephen Williams (cyclist).
