= 2007 Six Days Track Cycling Events =

The 2007 Six days track cycling events are multi-race competitions, each taking place over six days at various locations in mainland Europe. The riders challenge each other in track cycling disciplines including the madison, track time trials, sprints, and Derny motor-paced races.

The competitions are organised by the UCI.

== Results ==
Date	Location	Winners	Second	Third
1-6 June 2006	Fiorenzuola, Italy	(Switzerland) Franco Marvulli (Italy) Marco Villa	(Denmark) Marc Hester (Italy) Samuele Marzoli	(Argentina) Sebastian Donadio (Argentina) Mauro Richeze
28 Sep-3 October 2006	Maastricht, Netherlands	(Switzerland) Bruno Risi (Switzerland) Franco Marvulli	(Belgium) Iljo Keisse (Italy) Marco Villa	(Netherlands) Danny Stam (Netherlands) Peter Schep
16-21 October 2006	Amsterdam, Netherlands	(Netherlands) Danny Stam (Netherlands) Peter Schep	(Spain) Juan Llaneras (Spain) Isaac Gálvez	(Switzerland) Bruno Risi (Switzerland) Franco Marvulli
26-31 October 2006	Grenoble, France	(Switzerland) Alexander Äschbach (Switzerland) Franco Marvulli	(Denmark) Michael Mørkøv (Denmark) Alex Rasmussen	(Netherlands) Jens Mouris (Netherlands) Peter Schep
26-31 October 2006	Dortmund, Germany	(Germany) Erik Zabel (Switzerland) Bruno Risi	(Germany) Guido Fulst (Germany) Leif Lampater	(Netherlands) Danny Stam (Germany) Andreas Beikirch
9-14 November 2006	Munich, Germany	(Germany) Erik Zabel (Switzerland) Bruno Risi	(Switzerland) Franco Marvulli (Belgium) Iljo Keisse	(Netherlands) Danny Stam (Netherlands) Peter Schep
21-26 November 2006	Ghent, Belgium	cancelled after day five due to the death of Isaac Gálvez		
28 Dec-2 January 2007	Zürich, Switzerland	(Switzerland) Bruno Risi (Switzerland) Franco Marvulli	(Germany) Robert Bartko (Belgium) Iljo Keisse	(Germany) Guido Fulst (Germany) Leif Lampater
4-9 January 2007	Rotterdam, Netherlands	(Germany) Robert Bartko (Belgium) Iljo Keisse	(Netherlands) Danny Stam (Italy) Marco Villa	(Spain) Juan Llaneras (Germany) Andreas Beikirch
11-16 January 2007	Bremen, Germany	(Switzerland) Bruno Risi (Germany) Erik Zabel	(Germany) Guido Fulst (Germany) Leif Lampater	(Germany) Robert Bartko (Belgium) Iljo Keisse
18-23 January 2007	Stuttgart, Germany	(Germany) Alexander Äschbach (Switzerland) Franco Marvulli (Switzerland) Bruno Risi	(Germany) Robert Bartko (Germany) Guido Fulst (Germany) Leif Lampater	(Netherlands) Peter Schep (Netherlands) Danny Stam (Germany) Olaf Pollack
25-30 January 2007	Berlin, Germany	(Germany) Guido Fulst (Germany) Leif Lampater	(Germany) Robert Bartko (Germany) Andreas Beikirch	(Switzerland) Franco Marvulli (Switzerland) Bruno Risi
1-6 February 2007	Copenhagen, Denmark	(Switzerland) Franco Marvulli (Switzerland) Bruno Risi	(Denmark) Jacob Piil (Denmark) Alex Rasmussen	(Netherlands) Peter Schep (Denmark) Danny Stam
8-13 February 2007	Hasselt, Belgium	(Switzerland) Franco Marvulli (Switzerland) Bruno Risi	(Belgium) Iljo Keisse (Italy) Marco Villa	(Germany) Alexander Äschbach (Belgium) Dimitri De Fauw
