= Six Days of Fiorenzuola =

Six-day track cycling race

Race details
- Region: Fiorenzuola, Italy
- Discipline: Track
- Type: Six-day racing
- Web site: www.fiorenzuolatrack.eu

History
- First edition: 1998
- Editions: 27 (as of 2024)
- First winner: Giovanni Lombardi (ITA); Bruno Risi (SUI)
- Most recent: Lev Gonov (RUS); Ivan Smirnov (RUS)

The Six Days of Fiorenzuola is a six-day track cycling race held annually in Fiorenzuola, Italy. The event was first held in 1998.

== Winners ==
Year	Winners	Second	Third
1998	Giovanni Lombardi (ITA); Bruno Risi (SUI)	Adriano Baffi (ITA); Marco Villa (ITA)	Gerd Dörich (GER); Carsten Wolf (GER)
1999	Andrea Collinelli (ITA); Mario Cipollini (ITA)	Kurt Betschart (SUI); Bruno Risi (SUI)	Giovanni Lombardi (ITA); Silvio Martinello (ITA)
2000	Silvio Martinello (ITA); Andrea Collinelli (ITA)	Ivan Quaranta (ITA); Marco Villa (ITA)	Kurt Betschart (SUI); Bruno Risi (SUI)
2001	Marco Villa (ITA); Ivan Quaranta (ITA)	Stefan Steinweg (GER); Erik Weispfennig (GER)	Giovanni Lombardi (ITA); Scott McGrory (AUS)
2002	Matthew Gilmore (BEL); Scott McGrory (AUS)	Bruno Risi (SUI); Giovanni Lombardi (ITA)	Ivan Quaranta (ITA); Marco Villa (ITA)
2003	Juan Curuchet (ARG); Giovanni Lombardi (ITA)	Matthew Gilmore (BEL); Scott McGrory (AUS)	Davide Grabelli (ITA); Marco Villa (ITA)
2004	Samuele Marzoli (ITA); Giovanni Lombardi (ITA)	Franco Marvulli (SUI); Iljo Keisse (BEL)	Ivan Quaranta (ITA); Marco Villa (ITA)
2005	Matthew Gilmore (BEL); Iljo Keisse (BEL)	Samuele Marzoli (ITA); Marco Villa (ITA)	Juan Curuchet (ARG); Walter Pérez (ARG)
2006	Franco Marvulli (SUI); Marco Villa (ITA)	Marc Hester (DEN); Samuele Marzoli (ITA)	Sebastián Donadio (ARG); Mauro Abel Richeze (ARG)
2007	Franco Marvulli (SUI); Bruno Risi (SUI)	Juan Curuchet (ARG); Walter Pérez (ARG)	Joan Llaneras (ESP); Marco Villa (ITA)
2008	Franco Marvulli (SUI); Bruno Risi (SUI)	Kenny De Ketele (BEL); Iljo Keisse (BEL)	Robert Slippens (NLD); Danny Stam (NED)
2009	Alexander Äschbach (SUI); Franco Marvulli (SUI)	Bruno Risi (SUI); Jacopo Guarnieri (ITA)	Alois Kaňkovský (CZE); Petr Lazar (CZE)
2010	Alex Rasmussen (DEN); Michael Mørkøv (DEN)	Franco Marvulli (SUI); Walter Pérez (ARG)	Jacopo Guarnieri (ITA); Danny Stam (NLD)
2011	Elia Viviani (ITA); Jacopo Guarnieri (ITA)	Franco Marvulli (SUI); Leif Lampater (GER)	Martin Bláha (CZE); Jiří Hochmann (CZE)
2012	Franco Marvulli (SUI); Tristan Marguet (SUI)	Milan Kadlec (CZE); Alois Kaňkovský (CZE)	Vojtěch Hačecký (CZE); Jiří Hochmann (CZE)
2013	Shane Archbold (NZL); Dylan Kennett (NZL)	Evgeny Kovalev (RUS); Ivan Kovalev (RUS)	Tristan Marguet (SUI); Loïc Perizzolo (SUI)
2014	Alex Buttazzoni (ITA); Marco Coledan (ITA)	Olivier Beer (SUI); Tristan Marguet (SUI)	Nikolay Zhurkin (RUS); Ivan Kovalev (RUS)
2015	Alex Buttazzoni (ITA); Elia Viviani (ITA)	Michele Scartezzini (ITA); Francesco Lamon (ITA)	Jan Dostal (CZE); Ondrej Vendolský (CZE)
2016	Michele Scartezzini (ITA); Elia Viviani (ITA)	Morgan Kneisky (FRA); Benjamin Thomas (FRA)	Tristan Marguet (SUI); Gael Suter (SUI)
2017	Morgan Kneisky (FRA); Benjamin Thomas (FRA)	Tristan Marguet (SUI); Gael Suter (SUI)	Christos Volikakis (GRE); Lukem Lichnovsky (CZE)
2018	Liam Bertazzo (ITA); Francesco Lamon (ITA)	Tristan Marguet (SUI); Gael Suter (SUI)	Raman Tsishkou (BLR); Yauheni Akhramenka (BLR)
2019	Michele Scartezzini (ITA); Davide Plebani (ITA)	Christos Volikakis (GRE); Zaferis Volikakis (GRE)	Vitaly Hrniv (UKR); Roman Gladysh (UKR)
2020	Stefano Moro (ITA); Davide Plebani (ITA)	Francesco Lamon (ITA); Michele Scartezzini (ITA)	Yoeri Havik (NLD); Jan-Willem van Schip (NLD)
2021	Donovan Grondin (FRA); Benjamin Thomas (FRA)	Elia Viviani (ITA); Simone Consonni (ITA)	Tristan Marguet (CHE); Théry Schir (CHE)
2022	Filippo Ganna (ITA); Michele Scartezzini (ITA)	Bartosz Rudyk (POL); Daniel Staniszewski (POL)	Stefano Moro (ITA); Matteo Donegà (ITA)
2023	Elia Viviani (ITA); Michele Scartezzini (ITA)	Liam Walsh (AUS); Peter Moore (USA)	Lev Gonov (RUS); Ivan Smirnov (RUS)
2024	Lev Gonov (RUS); Ivan Smirnov (RUS)	Viktor Bugaenko (RUS); Daniil Zarakovskiy (RUS)	Davide Boscaro (ITA); Michele Scartezzini (ITA)
