= Six Days of Turin =

Six-day track cycling race

Race details
- Region: Turin, Italy
- Local name(s): 6 Giorni di Torino
- Discipline: Track
- Type: Six-day racing

History
- First edition: 2001
- Editions: 9 (as of 2018)
- First winner: Ivan Quaranta (ITA); Marco Villa (ITA)
- Most recent: Mattia Viel (ITA); Nicholas Yallouris (AUS)

The Six Days of Turin (Italian: 6 Giorni di Torino) is a six-day track cycling race held annually in Turin, Italy since 2001.

== Winners ==
Year	Winner	Second	Third
2001	(Italy) Ivan Quaranta (Italy) Marco Villa	(Switzerland) Bruno Risi (Switzerland) Kurt Betschart	(Italy) Adriano Baffi (Belgium) Matthew Gilmore
2002	(Italy) Ivan Quaranta (Italy) Marco Villa	(Australia) Scott McGrory (Belgium) Matthew Gilmore	(Switzerland) Bruno Risi (Switzerland) Kurt Betschart
2003	(Australia) Scott McGrory (United Kingdom) Tony Gibb	(Slovakia) Martin Liška (Slovakia) Jozef Žabka	(Italy) Samuele Marzoli (Italy) Marco Villa
2004	(Italy) Ivan Quaranta (Italy) Marco Villa	(Slovakia) Martin Liška (Slovakia) Jozef Žabka	(Argentina) Sebastián Donadio (Germany) Daniel Schlegel
2005	(Argentina) Sebastián Donadio (Italy) Marco Villa	(Argentina) Juan Curuchet (Argentina) Walter Pérez	(Slovakia) Martin Liška (Slovakia) Jozef Žabka
2006	No race
2007	(Argentina) Juan Curuchet (Argentina) Walter Pérez	(Switzerland) Franco Marvulli (Italy) Marco Villa	(Czechoslovakia) Alois Kaňkovský (Czechoslovakia) Petr Lazar
2008	(Switzerland) Bruno Risi (Switzerland) Franco Marvulli	(Argentina) Sebastián Donadio (Argentina) Ángel Darío Colla	(Netherlands) Robert Slippens (Netherlands) Danny Stam
2009–2016	No race
2017	(Italy) Elia Viviani (Italy) Francesco Lamon	(Republic of Ireland) Felix English (Republic of Ireland) Marc Potts	(Kazakhstan) Roman Vassilenkov (Kazakhstan) Sergey Shatovkin
2018	(Italy) Mattia Viel (Australia) Nicholas Yallouris	(Belarus) Yauheni Akhramenka (Belarus) Raman Tsishkou	(France) Joseph Berlin-Sémon (France) Morgan Kneisky
