= 2007 Six Days of Zürich =

The 2007 Six Days of Zürich were six-day track cycling races held from 28 December 2006 to 2 January 2007 in the Hallenstadion in Zürich.

== Participants ==
=== Main participants ===
No.	Riders	No.	Riders
1	(Switzerland) Bruno Risi (Switzerland) Franco Marvulli	8	(Switzerland) Alexander Äschbach (Italy) Marco Villa
2	(Germany) Christian Lademann (Germany) Christian Grasmann	9	(Germany) Andreas Beikirch (Germany) Robert Bengsch
3	(Germany) Andy Kappes (Germany) Erik Mohs	10	(Switzerland) Réne Schibli (Germany) Gert Dörich
4	(Netherlands) Danny Stam (Netherlands) Jens Mouris	11	(Germany) Guido Fulst (Germany) Leif Lampater
5	(Italy) Fabio Masotti (Italy) Angelo Ciccone	12	(Switzerland) Tobias Baumgartner (Switzerland) Benjamin Baumgartner
6	(Germany) Robert Bartko (Belgium) Iljo Keisse	13	(Switzerland) Bruno Menzi (Germany) Stefan Löffler
7	(Denmark) Alex Rasmussen (Denmark) Michael Mørkøv	14	(Switzerland) Gregor Gut (Denmark) Marc Hester

=== Derny endurance participants ===
No.	Rider	No.	Rider
1	(Switzerland) Jörg Peter	4	(Germany) Carsten Podlesch
2	(Switzerland) Giuseppe Atzeni	5	(Netherlands) Reinier Honig
3	(Switzerland) Jan Ramsauer	6	(Switzerland) Reto Frey

== Results ==
=== Six Days main event ===
No.	Riders	R	P	R	P	R	P	R	P	R	P	R	P
		Day 1		Day 2		Day 3		Day 4		Day 5		Day 6	
1	(Switzerland) Bruno Risi (Switzerland) Franco Marvulli	0	71	0	152	0	221	0	254	1	323	0	394
2	(Germany) Robert Bartko (Belgium) Iljo Keisse	0	58	0	120	1	177	0	236	0	314	0	357
3	(Germany) Guido Fulst (Germany) Leif Lampater	0	53	0	113	2	176	2	194	2	250	1	281
4	(Switzerland) Alexander Äschbach (Italy) Marco Villa	0	48	2	87	3	119	4	145	5	197	4	221
5	(Netherlands) Danny Stam (Netherlands) Jens Mouris	1	27	3	53	5	84	7	96	8	128	11	166
6	(Denmark) Alex Rasmussen (Denmark) Michael Mørkøv	0	55	2	100	6	155	9	174	9	237	12	256
7	(Germany) Andreas Beikirch (Germany) Robert Bengsch	1	35	4	62	7	80	10	90	10	120	13	142
8	(Germany) Christian Lademann (Germany) Christian Grasmann	1	31	4	58	7	67	10	74	11	102	14	134
9	(Italy) Fabio Masotti (Italy) Angelo Ciccone	4	14	8	24	12	52	16	59	21	71	24	101
10	(Germany) Andy Kappes (Germany) Erik Mohs	4	6	13	22	19	36	24	41	28	56	32	60
11	(Switzerland) Bruno Menzi (Germany) Stefan Löffler	5	16	11	38	18	61	25	69	30	90	34	101
12	(Switzerland) Tobias Baumgartner (Switzerland) Benjamin Baumgartner	5	4	12	9	21	15	30	20	34	26	40	33
13	(Switzerland) Réne Schibli (Germany) Gerd Dörich	8	3	16	12	24	22	30	32	36	50	42	57
14	(Switzerland) Gregor Gut (Denmark) Marc Hester	7	13	15	18	25	33	34	34	41	54	48	69

=== Six Days Derny endurance ===
No.	Riders	Day 1	Day 2	Day 3	Day 4	Day 5	Day 6
1	(Switzerland) Giuseppe Atzeni	6	9	15	16	20	26
2	(Germany) Carsten Podlesch	5	7	12	18	20	25
3	(Switzerland) Peter Jörg	2	6	11	16	20	24
4	(Switzerland) Jan Ramsauer	4	8	11	15	21	22
4	(Netherlands) Reinier Honig	3	7	11	14	19	22
6	(Switzerland) Reto Frey	1	2	3	3	5	5
