= Six Days of Hasselt =

Race details
- Region: Hasselt, Belgium
- Discipline: Track
- Type: Six-day racing

History
- First edition: 2006
- Editions: 4 (as of 2009)
- Final edition: 2009
- First winner: Iljo Keisse (BEL); Matthew Gilmore (BEL)
- Most wins: Bruno Risi (SUI) (3 wins)
- Final winner: Bruno Risi (SUI); Kenny De Ketele (BEL)

The Six Days of Hasselt was a six-day track cycling race held annually in Hasselt, Belgium.

== Winners ==
Year	Winner	Second	Third
2006	(Belgium) Iljo Keisse (Belgium) Matthew Gilmore	(Netherlands) Robert Slippens (Netherlands) Danny Stam	(Belgium) Tom Steels (Italy) Marco Villa
2007	(Switzerland) Bruno Risi (Switzerland) Franco Marvulli	(Italy) Marco Villa (Belgium) Iljo Keisse	(Belgium) Dimitri De Fauw (Switzerland) Alexander Äschbach
2008	(Switzerland) Bruno Risi (Switzerland) Franco Marvulli	(Belgium) Kenny De Ketele (Belgium) Iljo Keisse	(Netherlands) Danny Stam (Italy) Marco Villa
2009	(Switzerland) Bruno Risi (Belgium) Kenny De Ketele	(Germany) Leif Lampater (Netherlands) Léon van Bon	(Switzerland) Franco Marvulli (Belgium) Tim Mertens
