= UCI Track Cycling World Championships – Men's madison =

The UCI Track Cycling World Championships – Men's madison is the world championship madison event held annually at the UCI Track Cycling World Championships. It was first held at the 1995 championships in Bogotá, Colombia. As of 2026, Joan Llaneras of Spain (1997, 1999 and 2006), Mark Cavendish of Great Britain (2005, 2008 and 2016), Michael Mørkøv of Denmark (2009, 2020 and 2021), Roger Kluge of Germany (2018, 2019, 2024) and Lasse Norman Leth of Denmark (2020, 2021, 2026) have won the most titles.

== Medalists ==
Championships	Winner	Runner-up	Third
1995 Bogotá	Silvio Martinello; Marco Villa; Italy	Gabriel Ovidio Curuchet; Juan Esteban Curuchet; Argentina	Kurt Betschart; Bruno Risi; Switzerland
1996 Manchester	Silvio Martinello; Marco Villa; Italy	Scott McGrory; Stephen Pate; Australia	Andreas Kappes; Carsten Wolf; Germany
1997 Perth	Joan Llaneras; Miquel Alzamora; Spain	Silvio Martinello; Marco Villa; Italy	Gabriel Ovidio Curuchet; Juan Esteban Curuchet; Argentina
1998 Bordeaux	Etienne De Wilde; Matthew Gilmore; Belgium	Silvio Martinello; Andrea Collinelli; Italy	Andreas Kappes; Stefan Steinweg; Germany
1999 Berlin	Joan Llaneras; Isaac Gálvez; Spain	Jimmi Madsen; Jacob Piil; Denmark	Andreas Kappes; Olaf Pollack; Germany
2000 Manchester	Stefan Steinweg; Erik Weispfennig; Germany	Joan Llaneras; Isaac Gálvez; Spain	Edgardo Simón; Juan Esteban Curuchet; Argentina
2001 Antwerp	Jérôme Neuville; Robert Sassone; France	Joan Llaneras; Isaac Gálvez; Spain	Juan Esteban Curuchet; Gabriel Ovidio Curuchet; Argentina
2002 Copenhagen	Jérôme Neuville; Franck Perque; France	Roland Garber; Franz Stocher; Austria	Edgardo Simón; Juan Esteban Curuchet; Argentina
2003 Stuttgart	Bruno Risi; Franco Marvulli; Switzerland	Gregory Henderson; Hayden Roulston; New Zealand	Walter Pérez; Juan Esteban Curuchet; Argentina
2004 Melbourne	Walter Pérez; Juan Esteban Curuchet; Argentina	Franco Marvulli; Bruno Risi; Switzerland	Danny Stam; Robert Slippens; Netherlands
2005 Los Angeles	Mark Cavendish; Robert Hayles; Great Britain	Robert Slippens; Danny Stam; Netherlands	Iljo Keisse; Matthew Gilmore; Belgium
2006 Bordeaux	Isaac Gálvez; Joan Llaneras; Spain	Lyubomyr Polatayko; Volodymyr Rybin; Ukraine	Juan Esteban Curuchet; Walter Pérez; Argentina
2007 Palma de Mallorca	Bruno Risi; Franco Marvulli; Switzerland	Peter Schep; Danny Stam; Netherlands	Alois Kaňkovský; Petr Lazar; Czech Republic
2008 Manchester	Mark Cavendish; Bradley Wiggins; Great Britain	Roger Kluge; Olaf Pollack; Germany	Michael Mørkøv; Alex Rasmussen; Denmark
2009 Pruszków	Michael Mørkøv; Alex Rasmussen; Denmark	Leigh Howard; Cameron Meyer; Australia	Martin Bláha; Jiří Hochmann; Czech Republic
2010 Ballerup	Leigh Howard; Cameron Meyer; Australia	Morgan Kneisky; Christophe Riblon; France	Ingmar De Poortere; Steve Schets; Belgium
2011 Apeldoorn	Leigh Howard; Cameron Meyer; Australia	Martin Bláha; Jiří Hochmann; Czech Republic	Theo Bos; Peter Schep; Netherlands
2012 Melbourne	Kenny De Ketele; Gijs Van Hoecke; Belgium	Ben Swift; Geraint Thomas; Great Britain	Leigh Howard; Cameron Meyer; Australia
2013 Minsk	Morgan Kneisky; Vivien Brisse; France	David Muntaner; Albert Torres; Spain	Henning Bommel; Theo Reinhardt; Germany
2014 Cali	David Muntaner; Albert Torres; Spain	Martin Blàha; Vojtech Hacecky; Czech Republic	Stefan Küng; Théry Schir; Switzerland
2015 Yvelines	Morgan Kneisky; Bryan Coquard; France	Marco Coledan; Elia Viviani; Italy	Jasper De Buyst; Otto Vergaerde; Belgium
2016 London	Mark Cavendish; Bradley Wiggins; Great Britain	Morgan Kneisky; Benjamin Thomas; France	Sebastián Mora; Albert Torres; Spain
2017 Hong Kong	Morgan Kneisky; Benjamin Thomas; France	Cameron Meyer; Callum Scotson; Australia	Moreno De Pauw; Kenny De Ketele; Belgium
2018 Apeldoorn	Roger Kluge; Theo Reinhardt; Germany	Albert Torres; Sebastián Mora; Spain	Cameron Meyer; Callum Scotson; Australia
2019 Pruszków	Roger Kluge; Theo Reinhardt; Germany	Lasse Norman Hansen; Casper von Folsach; Denmark	Kenny De Ketele; Robbe Ghys; Belgium
2020 Berlin	Lasse Norman Hansen; Michael Mørkøv; Denmark	Campbell Stewart; Aaron Gate; New Zealand	Roger Kluge; Theo Reinhardt; Germany
2021 Roubaix	Lasse Norman Hansen; Michael Mørkøv; Denmark	Simone Consonni; Michele Scartezzini; Italy	Kenny De Ketele; Robbe Ghys; Belgium
2022 Saint-Quentin-en-Yvelines	Donovan Grondin; Benjamin Thomas; France	Ethan Hayter; Oliver Wood; Great Britain	Fabio Van Den Bossche; Lindsay De Vylder; Belgium
2023 Glasgow	Jan Willem van Schip; Yoeri Havik; Netherlands	Oliver Wood; Mark Stewart; Great Britain	Aaron Gate; Campbell Stewart; New Zealand
2024 Ballerup	Roger Kluge; Tim Torn Teutenberg; Germany	Lindsay De Vylder; Fabio Van Den Bossche; Belgium	Niklas Larsen; Michael Mørkøv; Denmark
2025 Santiago	Lindsay De Vylder; Fabio Van den Bossche; Belgium	Mark Stewart; Josh Tarling; Great Britain	Niklas Larsen; Lasse Norman Leth; Denmark
2026 Shanghai	Carl-Frederik Bévort; Lasse Norman Leth; Denmark	Iúri Leitão; Ivo Oliveira; Portugal	Moritz Augenstein; Roger Kluge; Germany

== Medal table ==
Rank	Nation	Gold	Silver	Bronze	Total
1	France	6	2	0	8
2	Spain	4	4	1	9
3	Denmark	4	2	3	9
4	Germany	4	1	6	11
5	Great Britain	3	4	0	7
6	Belgium	3	1	7	11
7	Italy	2	4	0	6
8	Australia	2	3	2	7
9	Switzerland	2	1	2	5
10	Netherlands	1	2	2	5
11	Argentina	1	1	6	8
12	Czech Republic	0	2	2	4
13	New Zealand	0	2	1	3
14	Austria	0	1	0	1
14	Portugal	0	1	0	1
14	Ukraine	0	1	0	1
Totals (16 entries)		32	32	32	96
