= 2007 UCI Track Cycling World Championships – Men's madison =

Men's madison at the 2007 UCI Track Cycling World Championships
- Venue: Palma Arena
- Location: Palma de Mallorca, Spain
- Dates: 1 April 2007
- Winning points: 14

Medalists
gold medal	Franco Marvulli; Bruno Risi	Switzerland
silver medal	Peter Schep; Danny Stam	Netherlands
bronze medal	Alois Kaňkovský; Petr Lazar	Czech Republic

The Men's Madison was one of the 10 men's events at the 2007 UCI Track World Championship, held in Palma de Mallorca, Spain. The event was won by the Swiss pairing of Franco Marvulli and Bruno Risi. Defending champions Spain was represented by Joan Llaneras and Carlos Torrent, following the death of Llaneras's long-time Madison partner Isaac Gálvez in November 2006.

16 teams, each of two riders participated in the contest. The Final was held on April 1, 2007, at 16:10.

== Results ==
Rank	Name	Country	Points	Laps down
	Franco Marvulli and Bruno Risi	Switzerland	14	
	Peter Schep and Danny Stam	Netherlands	13	
	Alois Kaňkovský and Petr Lazar	Czech Republic	11	
4	Joan Llaneras and Carlos Torrent	Spain	8	
5	Lyubomyr Polatayko and Volodymyry Rybin	Ukraine	7	
6	Juan Curuchet and Walter Fernando Perez	Argentina	4	
7	Kenny De Ketele and Iljo Keisse	Belgium	14	−1
8	Michael Mørkøv and Alex Rasmussen	Denmark	8	−1
9	Andy Flickinger and Mathieu Ladagnous	France	7	−1
10	Guido Fulst and Leif Lampater	Germany	5	−1
11	Roland Garber and Andreas Graf	Austria	10	−2
12	Marco Villa and Matteo Montaguti	Italy	3	−2
13	Robert Hayles and Bradley Wiggins	Great Britain	3	−2
14	Mikhail Ignatiev and Nikolay Trussov	Russia	2	−2
15	Matthew Goss and Cameron Meyer	Australia	1	−2
DNF	Marc Ryan and Peter Latham	New Zealand	0	−3
