= Revolution (cycling series) =

Series of track cycling events in England

Race details
- Date: October–February
- Region: Manchester (2003–2018); Glasgow (2013–2018); London (2014–2018); Derby (2015)
- Discipline: Track
- Type: Series

History
- First edition: 2003
- Editions: 15 seasons and 2 Champions League rounds
- Final edition: 2018

Revolution was a series of track cycling events primarily held at the Manchester Velodrome in the north west of England. It was solely held in Manchester between 2003 and 2012. From Season 10 (2012–2013), meetings were additionally held at the new UK velodromes; in the Sir Chris Hoy Velodrome in Glasgow, the Olympic Velodrome in London from Season 11 (2013–2014), and the Derby Arena from 2015 to 2016.

The series comprised four or five meetings each year, held between October and February, on Saturday evenings. The series showcased various top cyclists, both British and international, and was well-attended by spectators. The success of British cyclists in the 2000s and 2010s, including Chris Hoy's triple gold at the 2008 Summer Olympics and double gold-winning performance at the 2012 Summer Olympics, meant that the events regularly sold out in advance.

== History and concept ==
The series was founded in 2003, with the main aim of providing regular track cycling events for fans to attend in Manchester. Previously, track cycling fans were generally only able to attend one international event in Manchester each year, usually a round of the UCI Track Cycling World Cup Classics series, or as in 2000, the UCI Track Cycling World Championships. The only other events held regularly at the velodrome were events such as the British National Track Championships, which have a lower profile and therefore attracted smaller crowds.

An organisation management company, Face Partnership, was brought in to attempt to create a series providing regular top level events at the velodrome. The aim was to provide racing for existing fans and attract new fans to the sport, raising its profile as a sport in United Kingdom. It was also intended to give British riders the opportunity to take part in high quality racing during the winter. It was decided that the series would consist of four events throughout the season. Admission costs were fixed at an affordable level, originally £8 for an adult ticket, in order to enable families to attend. Family tickets were available for around £20, making the Revolution a considerably more affordable event to attend in comparison to other sports, such as football.

The first event was held in October 2003 and was attended by a good sized crowd. The event featured big British names like Bradley Wiggins, Rob Hayles, Chris Newton, John Scripps and David Millar. The series also rapidly attracted the attention of track sprinters from continental Europe, who took advantage of the opportunity to sharpen their skills against top-class fields without the levels of pressure experienced in World Cup events. The event continued to grow in stature and profile from this solid start, exceeding expected attendance targets along the way. Revolution 7 in early 2005 saw the series achieve its first near capacity crowd, the start of the event had to be delayed to allow the crowds into the venue. Revolution 14 was the series' first complete sell out, with some ticketless fans turned away. From early 2008 onwards the events began to sell out in advance.

The Revolution is also expanding into a global series, CotterPin has licensed the concept in Australia. The first Revolution Australia event was held in the Darebin International Sports Centre, Melbourne on 24 November 2007. There were over 3,000 spectators present at Australia's Revolution 1.

In July 2008, the Aftermarket company signed a deal with Face Partnership to create an expo area in the track centre at each event. This takes advantage of the captive audience and precise target consumers present at each Revolution.

Each Revolution meeting consists of a fast-paced, packed programme of races. The evening lasts for between 3 hours and 3 hours 45 minutes and typically involves around twenty events. Each event has three categories of racing including sprint and endurance, and the "Future Stars" series. Live PA duties at the events are carried out by the BBC commentator and cyclist, Hugh Porter.

In 2011–12, ITV4 broadcast a one-hour highlights show on Monday evenings following each Revolution meeting.

In September 2015 it was announced that Eurosport would broadcast live coverage of five rounds of the 2015–16 series.

In April 2016 a collaboration between FACE Partnership and Velon, an organisation representing 11 UCI WorldTeams, was announced with the aim of expanding the Revolution series internationally under the "Revolution Champions League", with the inaugural Champions League competition being held across three consecutive weekends in November and December 2016. The competition is planned to feature a total of 12 teams, of which eight will be drawn from the World Tour ranks. In June 2016 seven WorldTeams were confirmed as participants in the first Champions League, which would consist of six rounds held over three back-to-back weekends in Manchester, London and a third venue abroad, which was confirmed the following month as the Vélodrome National in Paris. However shortly before the Paris meeting was due to take place Face Partnership announced that it would be postponed to the following season.

Despite Revolution's popularity with both cyclists and fans, Face Partnership had been experiencing years-long financial problems which put the completion of the 2017-18 season at risk. The company was acquired by Beatermed Ltd. and Redwood Sports Ltd., which allowed the 2017-18 season to take place. This season notably marked the return of Olympic champion Jason Kenny to track cycling following a break after the 2016 Summer Olympics. After 15 seasons in as many years, the final Revolution event took place on 6th January 2018 at the Manchester Velodrome.

== Seasons overview ==
#	Season	Rounds
1	2003–2004	
2	2004–2005	
3	2005–2006	
4	2006–2007	
5	2007–2008	
6	2008–2009	
7	2009–2010	
8	2010–2011	
9	2011–2012	
10	2012–2013	4
11	2013–2014	5
12	2014–2015	6
13	2015–2016	6
14	2016–2017	3
Champions League	2017	2
15	2017–2018	3

== Competitions ==
=== Sprint racing ===
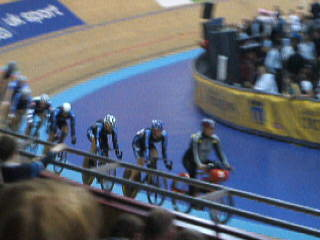
A Revolution Keirin Race

Each meeting featured a main Revolution Sprint competition, alongside other various events including the Keirin and Team sprint. The sprint competition was usually a straight knock-out event, typically with a first round, semi-final and final. In some events a sprint omnium has taken place, with all riders facing each other at some point during the session and the most successful winning overall. A men's sprinting competition usually took place at each event, with women's sprinting generally appearing for one event each year.

The events featured alongside the main sprint competition are tailored to the sprinters appearing and has included various challenges and revenge matches over the years. They regularly attract major British names and a host of international challengers. The list of World and Olympic Champions to have appeared include Chris Hoy, Theo Bos, Arnaud Tournant, Jason Kenny, Victoria Pendleton, Jamie Staff, Jens Fiedler, Grégory Baugé, Ross Edgar, Craig MacLean, Jason Queally, René Wolff, Jan van Eijden, Florian Rousseau, Stefan Nimke, Maximilian Levy, Teun Mulder, Robert Förstemann, Mickaël Bourgain, Willy Kanis, Matthew Rotherham, Christin Muche and Clara Sanchez.

=== Endurance racing ===
Every Revolution event included a field of elite endurance riders, racing over a number of events throughout the night. Events featured included the points race, scratch race, Madison, individual pursuit, team pursuit, motor-paced scratch race and devil elimination scratch race. Typically the blue ribbon Madison feature race takes place once a year and is named the Isaac Gálvez Memorial Madison. This was in memory of the Spanish rider and then-World Madison Champion who died during the Ghent Six Day meeting in 2006, one week before he was due to appear at Revolution 15.

The endurance racing attracted both major track riders and stars of the road, throwing up a number of unique contests over the years. The list of major names (on the track or the road) to have appeared include Bradley Wiggins, Mark Cavendish, Geraint Thomas, Ed Clancy, Joan Llaneras, Paul Manning, Bradley McGee, Chris Newton, Rob Hayles, Sergi Escobar, Steve Cummings, Stuart O'Grady, Iljo Keisse, Matthew Gilmore, Franco Marvulli, Bruno Risi, David Millar, Peter Schep, Robert Slippens, Nicole Cooke, Rebecca Romero and Graeme Obree.

=== Feature and exclusive races ===
As well including the major events from the World Championships and Olympics, the Revolution series also tried to feature some unique and exclusive races at its events. The Madison 1 km time trial was one such event. This event was a major crowd-pleaser and took place at each round. It was run over 1 km – four laps of the track – and consisted of two riders running two laps each. After the first rider had completed their laps, they performed a Madison hand sling with their partner who then completed the final two laps. While this by nature was an endurance riders event, its one kilometre distance meant that sprinters have also tasted success.

An early record for this event was set by Mark Cavendish and Ed Clancy – 58.5 Seconds at Revolution 7 in January 2005. This record stood until sprinters Craig MacLean and Arnaud Tournant set a new record of 55.1 seconds at Revolution 16 in January 2007. This was then further bettered when Tournant teamed up with Chris Hoy at Revolution 20 in February 2008. Tournant had a shoulder injury which prevented the duo doing a proper hand sling change over, however they still posted a record time of 54.4 seconds. This record stood until being broken by Ed Clancy and Ollie Wood in 2014.

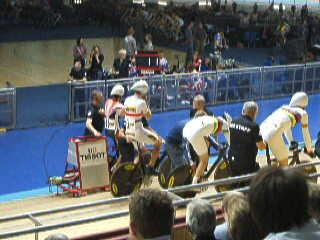
The Pursuit team of Hayles, Clancy, Thomas and Burke line up for the challenge against the sprint team at Revolution 22

A new challenge event added to the programme in 2008 was the Sprinters Vs. Pursuiters challenge. The first of these races took place at Revolution 21. This saw members of the GB team sprint squad (Jamie Staff, Jason Kenny and Ross Edgar) face off against members of the GB team pursuit squad (Ed Clancy, Geraint Thomas and Steven Burke). The race took place over three laps with a flying start, to balance between the sprint and endurance disciplines. Due to the three lap length of the race – the same as the team sprint event – it was expected to naturally favour the sprint squad. However it was noted that the endurance squad regularly carried out similar short drills during training, so the playing field was more level going into the event. The endurance squad were able to use the flying start to their advantage and took a clean victory over the sprinters.

A rematch took place at Revolution 22 (2008), with the race extended to four laps with a standing start on this occasion. Matthew Crampton joined the sprint squad and Rob Hayles joined the endurance squad. The fast start of Jamie Staff allowed the sprint squad to level the series.

Other special events have included the Geoff Thomas Charity Challenge Race at Revolution 20. This involved Thomas captaining a team of riders against a team led by Rugby World Cup-winning captain Martin Johnson. This was a 5-lap team sprint-style challenge race, with each team including star riders like Chris Hoy, Victoria Pendleton, Arnaud Tournant and Peter Schep. The teams were drawn at the start of the evening, equally sharing out the riders. Team Thomas won by 0.1 seconds and raised a good sum of money for the Geoff Thomas Charity Foundation.

==== Women's omnium ====
The second round of the 2012–2013 Revolution series (round 38 in Manchester) included a women's omnium event. Dutch cyclist Marianne Vos won, including the elimination race, this omnium event ahead of British rider Lizzie Armitstead. Ellen van Dijk of the Netherlands won the points race, Katie Colclough the scratch race and the British team the team pursuit.

=== Future Stars series ===
Alongside the senior racing, the Future Stars competition also ran at each Revolution event. This series involved young riders, usually 14- to 16-year-olds and provided them with the opportunity to race in front of big crowds from an early age. They competed in a number of sprint and endurance races. Points were scored in each race and counted towards the overall leader board. The winner was crowned at the end of each series.

Some participants in the Future Stars series later went on to become elite athletes who saw significant success early in their professional careers. These include Jason Kenny (7-time Olympic and 3-time World Champion), Laura Kenny (5-time Olympic and 7-time World Champion), Steven Burke (2-time Olympic and 1-time World Champion), Peter Kennaugh (1-time Olympic and 1-time World Champion), Dani Rowe (1-time Olympic and 3-time World Champion) and Lizzie Deignan (1-time World Champion and Olympic medallist). The London 2012 Olympic squad included a large number of riders to have come through the series.
