= Six Days of Grenoble =

Track Cycling Race

Coordinates: 45.18550°N 5.74102°E

- Poster to the 1973 edition

Race details
- Region: Grenoble, France
- Local name(s): Six jours de Grenoble (in French)
- Discipline: Track
- Type: Six-day racing
- Race director: Bernard Thévenet

History
- First edition: 1971
- Editions: 44 (as of 2014)
- First winner: Peter Post (NED); Alain van Lancker (FRA)
- Most recent: Iljo Keisse (BEL); Kenny De Ketele (BEL)

The Six Days of Grenoble (French: Six jours cyclistes de Grenoble) is a six-day track cycling race held annually in Grenoble, France. Since 2012, the competition is called Four Days of Grenoble.

It takes place in the Palais des Sports in Grenoble since 1971.

Traditionally, the event took place the last week in October, the last edition was held in 2014.

== Winners ==
| Year | Winners |
|---|---|
| 1971 (1) | (Netherlands) Peter Post (France) Alain van Lancker |
| 1971 (2) | (France) Alain van Lancker (France) Jacky Mourioux |
| 1972 | (France) Alain van Lancker (France) Cyrille Guimard |
| 1973 | (Belgium) Patrick Sercu (Belgium) Eddy Merckx |
| 1974 | (France) Alain van Lancker (France) Jacky Mourioux |
| 1975 | (Belgium) Patrick Sercu (Belgium) Eddy Merckx |
| 1976 | (West Germany) Günther Haritz (France) Bernard Thévenet |
| 1977 | (Netherlands) René Pijnen (Italy) Francesco Moser |
| 1978 | (Belgium) Patrick Sercu (West Germany) Dietrich Thurau |
| 1979 | (Netherlands) René Pijnen (Italy) Francesco Moser |
| 1980 | (Australia) Danny Clark (France) Bernard Thévenet |
| 1981 | (Belgium) Patrick Sercu (Switzerland) Urs Freuler |
| 1982 | (France) Bernard Vallet (Denmark) Gert Frank |
| 1983 | (Switzerland) Daniel Gisiger (France) Patrick Clerc |
| 1984 | (France) Bernard Vallet (Denmark) Gert Frank |
| 1985 | No race |

| Year | Winners |
|---|---|
| 1986 | (Italy) Francesco Moser (United Kingdom) Anthony Doyle |
| 1987 | (France) Charly Mottet (France) Bernard Vallet |
| 1988 | (France) Charly Mottet (Liechtenstein) Roman Hermann |
| 1989 | (France) Gilbert Duclos-Lassalle (Australia) Danny Clark |
| 1990 | (France) Laurent Biondi (France) Laurent Fignon |
| 1991 | (France) Jean-Claude Colotti (France) Philippe Tarantini |
| 1992 | (France) Gilbert Duclos-Lassalle (Italy) Pierangelo Bincoletto |
| 1993 | (France) Gilbert Duclos-Lassalle (Italy) Pierangelo Bincoletto |
| 1994 | (Australia) Dean Woods (France) Jean-Claude Colotti |
| 1995 | (Italy) Marco Villa (Italy) Silvio Martinello |
| 1996 | (Italy) Adriano Baffi (Italy) Giovanni Lombardi |
| 1997 | (Denmark) Tayeb Braikia (Denmark) Jakob Piil |
| 1998 | (Italy) Adriano Baffi (Italy) Andrea Collinelli |
| 1999 | (Italy) Adriano Baffi (Italy) Andrea Collinelli |
| 2000 | (Spain) Joan Llaneras (Spain) Isaac Gálvez |

| Year | Winners |
|---|---|
| 2001 | (Switzerland) Franco Marvulli (Switzerland) Alexander Äschbach |
| 2002 | (Italy) Adriano Baffi (Italy) Marco Villa |
| 2003 | (Switzerland) Franco Marvulli (Switzerland) Alexander Äschbach |
| 2004 | (Switzerland) Franco Marvulli (Switzerland) Alexander Äschbach |
| 2005 | (Belgium) Matthew Gilmore (Belgium) Iljo Keisse |
| 2006 | (Switzerland) Franco Marvulli (Switzerland) Alexander Äschbach |
| 2007 | (Denmark) Michael Mørkøv (Denmark) Alex Rasmussen |
| 2008 | (Denmark) Michael Mørkøv (Denmark) Alex Rasmussen |
| 2009 | (Switzerland) Franco Marvulli (Australia) Luke Roberts |
| 2010 | (Switzerland) Alexander Äschbach (Switzerland) Franco Marvulli |
| 2011 | (Belgium) Iljo Keisse (France) Morgan Kneisky |
| 2012 | (Belgium) Kenny De Ketele (Belgium) Iljo Keisse |
| 2013 | (France) Morgan Kneisky (France) Vivien Brisse |
| 2014 | (France) Morgan Kneisky (France) Thomas Boudat |
