= Cycling at the 2004 Summer Olympics – Men's Madison =

Cycling at the Olympics

The men's Madison in cycling at the 2004 Summer Olympics was contested by 18 teams, 36 cyclists. The Madison race consisted of 200 laps of the track, or 50 kilometres. It was a two-person team event, with a tag-team format used to allow one cyclist to rest while his teammate raced.

== Medalists ==
Gold	Silver	Bronze
Graeme Brown and Stuart O'Grady (AUS)	Franco Marvulli and Bruno Risi (SUI)	Rob Hayles and Bradley Wiggins (GBR)

== Results ==
The Australian team of Stuart O'Grady and Graeme Brown rode consistently to achieve points in seven of the 10 sprints for a total of 22 points and the gold medal. The Swiss team of Franco Marvulli and Bruno Risi finished strongly winning the last three sprints for 15 points and the silver medal. British team of Rob Hayles and Bradley Wiggins achieved 12 points for the bronze medal, despite being in a fall mid-race.

Final results
Rank	Nation	Cyclist 1	Cyclist 2	Laps	Points
1	Australia	Graeme Brown	Stuart O'Grady		22
2	Switzerland	Franco Marvulli	Bruno Risi		15
3	Great Britain	Rob Hayles	Bradley Wiggins		12
4	Germany	Robert Bartko	Guido Fulst		9
5	Ukraine	Volodymyr Rybin	Vasyl Yakovlev		9
6	Spain	Miguel Alzamora	Joan Llaneras		7
7	New Zealand	Greg Henderson	Hayden Roulston		2
8	Austria	Roland Garber	Franz Stocher	-1	8
9	Argentina	Juan Curuchet	Walter Pérez	-1	5
10	Uruguay	Tomás Margalef	Milton Wynants	-1	3
11	Belgium	Matthew Gilmore	Iljo Keisse	-1	3
12	Kazakhstan	Ilya Chernyshov	Yuriy Yuda	-1	2
13	Czech Republic	Milan Kadlec	Petr Lazar	-1	2
14	Netherlands	Robert Slippens	Danny Stam	-1	2
15	Slovakia	Martin Liška	Jozef Žabka	-2	5
16	Colombia	Leonardo Duque	José Serpa	-2	3
17	Russia	Oleg Grishkin	Alexey Shmidt	-2	2
DNF	France	Jérôme Neuville	Mathieu Ladagnous		
