= Six Days of Bordeaux =

Six-day track cycling race

Race details
- Region: Bordeaux, France
- Local name(s): Six jours de Bordeaux
- Discipline: Track
- Type: Six-day racing

History
- First edition: 1989
- Editions: 9
- Final edition: 1997
- First winner: Pierangelo Bincoletto (ITA); Laurent Biondi (FRA)
- Final winner: Silvio Martinello (ITA); Marco Villa (ITA)

The Six Days of Bordeaux (French: Six Jours de Bordeaux) was a six-day track cycling race held annually in Bordeaux, France from 1989 until 1997.

== Winners ==
Year	Winner	Second	Third
1989	(Italy) Pierangelo Bincoletto (France) Laurent Biondi	(France) Gilbert Duclos-Lassalle (Belgium) Etienne de Wilde	(Germany) Volker Diehl (France) Marc Meilleur
1990	(France) Gilbert Duclos-Lassalle (Belgium) Etienne De Wilde	(United Kingdom) Anthony Doyle (France) Pascal Lino	(Italy) Pierangelo Bincoletto (France) Laurent Biondi
1991	(France) Laurent Biondi (France) Gilbert Duclos-Lassalle	(France) Pascal Lino (Netherlands) Peter Pieters	(Italy) Pierangelo Bincoletto (Italy) Silvio Martinello
1992	(France) Pascal Lino (Netherlands) Peter Pieters	(France) Gilbert Duclos-Lassalle (Denmark) Jens Veggerby	(Italy) Adriano Baffi (Italy) Pierangelo Bincoletto
1993	(Italy) Adriano Baffi (Italy) Giovanni Lombardi	(Italy) Pierangelo Bincoletto (France) Gilbert Duclos-Lassalle	(Switzerland) Urs Freuler (Netherlands) Peter Pieters
1994	(Switzerland) Kurt Betschart (Switzerland) Bruno Risi	(Italy) Adriano Baffi (Italy) Giovanni Lombardi	(Italy) Pierangelo Bincoletto (France) Charly Mottet
1995	(France) Frédéric Magné (Belgium) Etienne De Wilde	(Italy) Silvio Martinello (Italy) Marco Villa	(Italy) Adriano Baffi (Italy) Pierangelo Bincoletto
1996	(Italy) Silvio Martinello (Italy) Marco Villa	(Denmark) Jimmi Madsen (Denmark) Jens Veggerby	(Australia) Danny Clark (Belgium) Matthew Gilmore
1997	(Italy) Silvio Martinello (Italy) Marco Villa	(Switzerland) Kurt Betschart (Switzerland) Bruno Risi	(Belgium) Matthew Gilmore (Belgium) Etienne De Wilde
