= Iljo Keisse =

Belgian cyclist (born 1982)

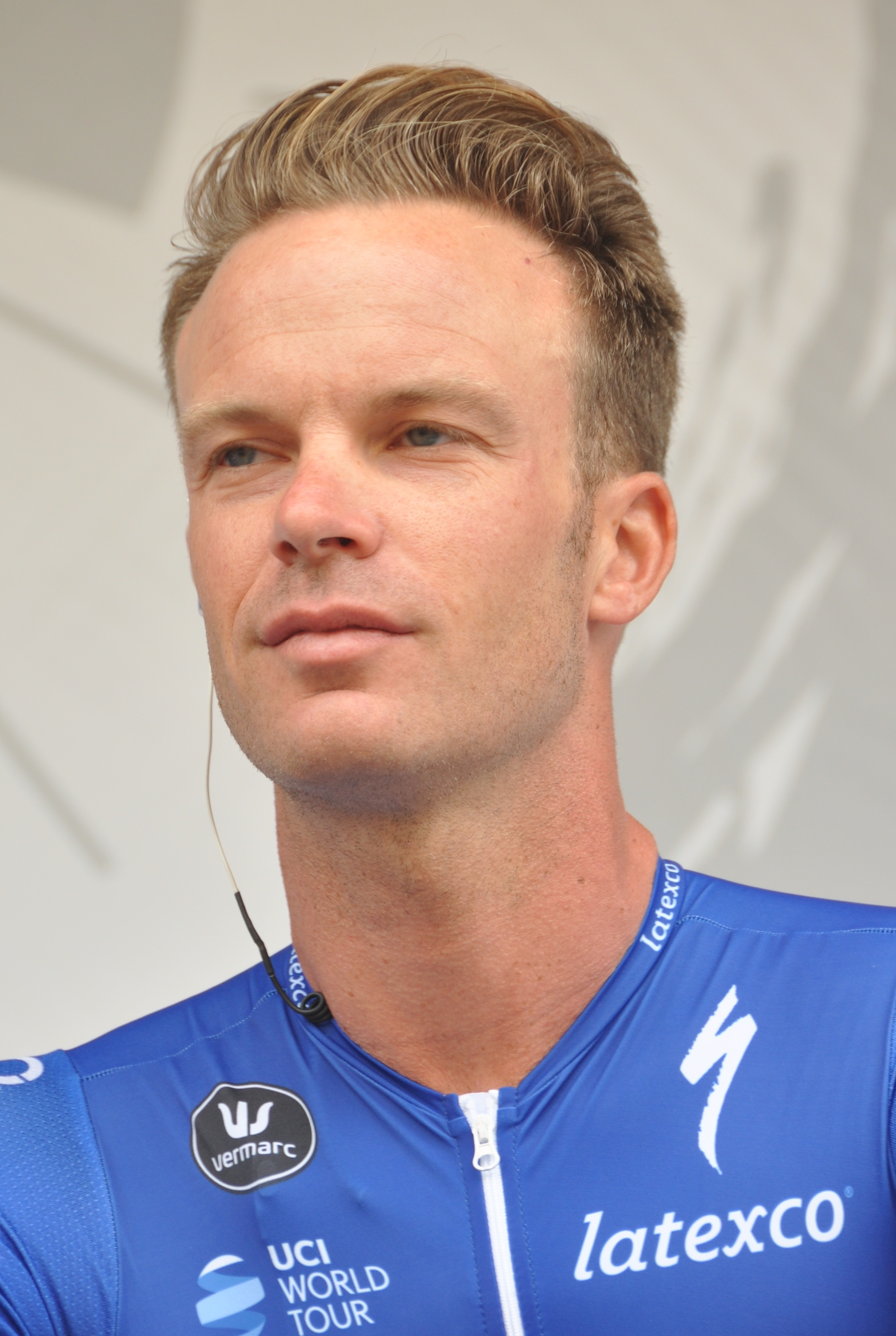
- Keisse at the 2018 Deutschland Tour

Personal information
- Full name: Iljo Keisse
- Nickname: Jolly Jumper
- Born: 21 December 1982 (age 43) Ghent, Belgium
- Height: 1.83 m (6 ft 0 in)
- Weight: 72 kg (159 lb)

Cycling career
- Sport: Cycling
- Current team: Retired
- Disciplines: Track; Road
- Role: Rider
- Rider type: Endurance (track); Classics rider (road)

Amateur team
- 2004: Jong Vlaanderen 2016

Professional teams
- 2005–2008: Chocolade Jacques–T Interim
- 2009: John Saey–Deschacht–Huyandai
- 2010–2022: Quick-Step

Major wins
- Grand Tours Giro d'Italia 1 individual stage (2015)
Medal record
Representing Belgium
Men's track cycling
World Championships
| Silver medal – second place | 2007 Palma de Mallorca | Points Race |
| Bronze medal – third place | 2005 Los Angeles | Madison |
European Championships
| Gold medal – first place | 2005 Dalmine | Madison |
| Gold medal – first place | 2006 Kopenhagen | Derny |
| Gold medal – first place | 2008 Alkmaar | Madison |
| Gold medal – first place | 2011 Apeldoorn | Madison |

Iljo Keisse (born 21 December 1982) is a Belgian former racing cyclist, who competed as a professional from 2005 to 2022. Keisse races on the track and on the road, specializing himself until recently in riding six-day races. He notably has won the Six Days of Ghent seven times and reached the podium a total of 12 times.

== Biography ==
Keisse was born in Ghent. Together with his teammate Matthew Gilmore, he won three Six-day races in 2005–2006: Grenoble, Ghent and Hasselt. After his victory in the 2008 Six Days of Ghent, both his A and B samples tested positive for cathine and a diuretic which has been used to mask the presence of doping agents. He was fired by his team Topsport Vlaanderen–Mercator on 11 January 2009. He joined the John Saey-Deschacht-Hyundai team in May 2009.

On 2 November 2009, Keisse was cleared of any wrongdoing, with investigators finding that the positives were not the result of intentional doping and likely resulted from a contaminated dietary supplement. On 7 July 2010, the Court of Arbitration for Sport upheld an appeal by the World Anti-Doping Agency and reinstated Keisse's ban. He is credited for the 11 months he already sat out, meaning he was eligible to return to competition in August 2011. In November, the CAS' decision was overturned by the Belgian Court of Appeals, allowing Keisse to ride the 2010 Six Days of Ghent. Keisse remained banned in Belgium until 27 January 2012, but re-signed with Omega Pharma–Quick-Step for the 2012 season.

On 28 April 2012, Keisse won Stage 7 of the Tour of Turkey in dramatic fashion. After leaving the rest of a seven-man breakaway, Keisse crashed on the final corner. He remounted his bike, realized his chain was off, restrung it, and held off the chasing peloton by three bike lengths in a sprint for the line. The first chasers were given the same time as his. This was the first professional win of his career and his last for over two years. His next victory was in the Châteauroux Classic in August 2014. Another win came in 2015, at the Ronde van Zeeland Seaports; he won this race from a group of three Etixx–Quick-Step riders who had escaped earlier. In the Giro d'Italia, Keisse won the last stage in Milan, upsetting the sprinters' plans. He got clear with Orica–GreenEDGE's Luke Durbridge and outsprinted him for the victory.

Keisse announced during the 2022 season that he would retire and that his final race would be the Gent Six. Racing alongside Jasper De Buyst, he finished during his 18th and final appearance 3rd.

== Major results ==
=== Road ===
2004
1st Stage 6 Tour du Loir-et-Cher
5th Overall Le Triptyque des Monts et Châteaux
2005
9th Bruxelles–Ingooigem
2006
4th Flèche Hesbignonne
6th Overall Tour of Britain
9th Overall Tour de Wallonie
2007
1st Textielprijs Vichte
3rd Kuurne–Brussels–Kuurne
7th Halle–Ingooigem
8th Omloop van het Waasland
2008
1st Textielprijs Vichte
4th GP Briek Schotte
2011
10th Dutch Food Valley Classic
2012
1st Stage 7 Tour of Turkey
2013
1st Omloop Mandel-Leie-Schelde
3rd Münsterland Giro
2014
1st Châteauroux Classic
2nd GP Briek Schotte
2015
1st Ronde van Zeeland Seaports
1st Profronde Deurne
1st Stage 21 Giro d'Italia
1st Stage 1 (TTT) Czech Cycling Tour
Combativity award Stage 5 Vuelta a España
2017
1st Omloop Mandel-Leie-Schelde
1st Textielprijs Vichte
3rd Le Samyn
3rd Halle–Ingooigem
10th Dwars door West-Vlaanderen
2020
2nd Road race, National Championships

==== Grand Tour general classification results timeline ====
| Grand Tour | 2013 | 2014 | 2015 | 2016 | 2017 | 2018 | 2019 | 2020 | 2021 |
|---|---|---|---|---|---|---|---|---|---|
| Giro d'Italia | 159 | 139 | 145 | — | 144 | — | — | 122 | 121 |
| Tour de France | — | — | — | 139 | — | — | — | — | — |
| Vuelta a España | — | — | 148 | — | — | — | — | — | — |

Legend
| — | Did not compete |
| DNF | Did not finish |
| IP | In progress |

=== Track ===
2004
2nd Six Days of Ghent (with Andreas Beikirch)
2nd Six Days of Fiorenzuola (with Franco Marvulli)
3rd Six Days of Grenoble (with Wouter Van Mechelen)
2005
1st Madison, UEC European Championships (with Matthew Gilmore)
1st Six Days of Fiorenzuola (with Matthew Gilmore)
1st Six Days of Grenoble (with Matthew Gilmore)
1st Six Days of Ghent (with Matthew Gilmore)
3rd Madison, UCI World Championships (with Matthew Gilmore)
3rd Six Days of Amsterdam (with Matthew Gilmore)
3rd Six Days of Bremen (with Marco Villa)
2006
1st Derny, UEC European Championships
1st Points race, National Championships
1st Six Days of Hasselt (with Matthew Gilmore)
2nd Six Days of Stuttgart (with Robert Bartko & Leif Lampater)
2nd Six Days of Zürich (with Robert Bartko)
2nd Six Days of Rotterdam (with Matthew Gilmore)
2nd Six Days of Munich (with Franco Marvulli)
2007
1st Six Days of Rotterdam (with Robert Bartko)
1st Six Days of Ghent (with Robert Bartko)
1st Six Days of Amsterdam (with Robert Bartko)
2nd Points race, UCI World Championships
2nd Six Days of Maastricht (with Marco Villa)
2nd Six Days of Zürich (with Robert Bartko)
2nd Six Days of Munich (with Franco Marvulli)
2nd Six Days of Hasselt (with Marco Villa)
3rd Six Days of Bremen (with Robert Bartko)
2008
1st Madison, UEC European Championships (with Kenny De Ketele)
National Championships

1st Points race
1st Madison (with Kenny De Ketele)

1st Six Days of Stuttgart (with Robert Bartko & Leif Lampater)
1st Six Days of Bremen (with Robert Bartko)
1st Six Days of Ghent (with Robert Bartko)
1st Six Days of Munich (with Robert Bartko)
2nd Six Days of Zürich (with Robert Bartko)
2nd Six Days of Hasselt (with Kenny De Ketele)
2nd Six Days of Fiorenzuola (with Franco Marvulli)
3rd Six Days of Amsterdam (with Robert Bartko)
3rd Six Days of Copenhagen (with Danny Stam)
3rd Six Days of Rotterdam (with Robert Bartko)
2009
National Championships

1st Points race
1st Madison (with Kenny De Ketele)

2nd Six Days of Ghent (with Roger Kluge)
3rd Six Days of Grenoble (with Gianni Meersman)
2010
1st Six Days of Ghent (with Peter Schep)
1st Six Days of Rotterdam (with Danny Stam)
2nd Six Days of Bremen (with Robert Bartko)
2nd Six Days of Copenhagen (with Robert Bartko)
2011
1st Madison, UEC European Championships (with Kenny De Ketele)
National Championships

1st Derny
1st Madison (with Gert-Jan Van Immerseel)
1st Scratch

1st Six Days of Amsterdam (with Niki Terpstra)
1st Six Days of Grenoble (with Morgan Kneisky)
1st Six Days of Zürich (with Franco Marvulli)
2012
1st Six Days of Ghent (with Glenn O'Shea)
1st Six Days of Grenoble (with Kenny De Ketele)
1st Six Days of Copenhagen (with Marc Hester)
2nd Six Days of Amsterdam (with Niki Terpstra)
3rd Six Days of Bremen (with Leif Lampater)
3rd Six Days of Berlin (with Kenny De Ketele)
2013
1st Six Days of Rotterdam (with Niki Terpstra)
1st Six Days of Zürich (with Silvan Dillier)
2nd Six Days of Ghent (with Wim Stroetinga)
3rd Six Days of Grenoble (with Jasper De Buyst)
2014
National Championships

1st Madison (with Jasper De Buyst)
1st Scratch

1st Six Days of Rotterdam (with Niki Terpstra)
1st Six Days of Zürich (with Mark Cavendish)
2nd Six Days of Ghent (with Mark Cavendish)
2015
1st Six Days of Ghent (with Michael Mørkøv)
1st Six Days of Rotterdam (with Niki Terpstra)
1st Revolution Round 2 (with Andy Tennant)
1st Revolution Round 3 (with Wim Stroetinga)

1st Points race
1st Team elimination

3rd Six Days of London (with Gijs Van Hoecke)
2016
2nd Overall Revolution Champions League
3rd Six Days of Ghent (with Elia Viviani)
2017
1st Six Days of Bremen (with Marcel Kalz)
2018
1st Six Days of Ghent (with Elia Viviani)
2019
1st Six Days of Bremen (with Jasper De Buyst)
2022
3rd Six Days of Ghent (with Jasper De Buyst)

==== Six Days results timeline ====
| Race | 2004 | 2005 | 2006 | 2007 | 2008 | 2009 | 2010 | 2011 | 2012 | 2013 | 2014 | 2015 | 2016 | 2017 | 2018 | 2019 | 2020 | 2021 | 2022 |
|---|---|---|---|---|---|---|---|---|---|---|---|---|---|---|---|---|---|---|---|
| Six Days of Amsterdam | 10 | 3 | 4 | 1 | 3 | 4 | | 1 | 2 | | | NH | | Race discontinued | | | | | |
| Six Days of Bremen | | 3 | 4 | 3 | 1 | | 2 | | 3 | | | | | 1 | | 1 | | NH | NH |
| Six Days of Ghent | 2 | 1 | Can | 1 | 1 | 2 | 1 | | 1 | 2 | 2 | 1 | 3 | | 1 | | NH | | 3 |
| Six Days of Grenoble | 3 | 1 | | | | 3 | | 1 | 1 | 3 | | Race discontinued | | | | | | | |
| Six Days of Rotterdam | NH | 4 | 2 | 1 | 3 | | 1 | | 4 | 1 | 1 | 1 | | | | | | NH | |
| Six Days of Zürich | NH | | 2 | 2 | 2 | | 4 | 1 | | 1 | 1 | Race discontinued | | | | | | | |
