= 2007 UCI Track Cycling World Championships – Men's points race =

Men's points race at the 2007 UCI Track Cycling World Championships
- Venue: Palma Arena
- Location: Palma de Mallorca, Spain
- Date: 31 March 2007
- Winning points: 76

Medalists
gold medal	Joan Llaneras Rosello	Spain
silver medal	Iljo Keisse	Belgium
bronze medal	Mikhail Ignatiev	Russia

The Men's points race event of the 2007 UCI Track Cycling World Championships was held on 31 March 2007.

== Results ==
=== Qualifying ===
==== Heat 1 ====
Rank	Name	Nation	S1	S2	S3	S4	S5	S6	Laps	Points
1	Milan Kadlec	Czech Republic	1						20	21
2	Vladimir Tuychiev	Uzbekistan							20	20
3	Vasil Kiryienka	Belarus							20	20
4	Kam-Po Wong	Hong Kong							20	20
5	Juan Esteban Curuchet	Argentina		5				5		10
6	Alexander Äschbach	Switzerland		2	3		2	3		10
7	Cameron Meyer	Australia		1	2	5		1		9
8	Peter Schep	Netherlands	3			1	5			9
9	Joan Llaneras Rosello	Spain		3	5					8
10	Iljo Keisse	Belgium	5				3			8
11	Makoto Iijima	Japan			1	2		2		5
12	Ignatas Konovalovas	Lithuania				3				3
13	Robert Bengsch	Germany	2							2
14	Michael Creed	United States					1			1

==== Heat 2 ====
Rank	Name	Nation	S1	S2	S3	S4	S5	S6	Laps	Points
1	Ioannis Tamouridis	Greece		3					40	43
2	Carlos Alzate	Colombia		5				2	20	27
3	Oleksandr Polivoda	Ukraine			5				20	25
4	Hayden Roulston	New Zealand		2					20	22
5	Daniel Oss	Italy					1		20	21
6	David O'Loughlin	Ireland		1					20	21
7	Andreas Graf	Austria							20	20
8	Mikhail Ignatiev	Russia							20	20
9	Matthieu Ladagnous	France	3		1	3	2	5		14
10	Jens-Erik Madsen	Denmark	5				5	3		13
11	Rafał Ratajczyk	Poland	1			5	3			9
12	Zachary Bell	Canada	2		3	2				7
13	Chris Newton	United Kingdom			2	1		1		4
DNS	Andris Hernández	Venezuela								—N/a

=== Final ===
Rank	Name	Nation	Points
1	Joan Llaneras Rosello	Spain	76
2	Iljo Keisse	Belgium	55
3	Mikhail Ignatiev	Russia	52
4	Cameron Meyer	Australia	46
5	Milan Kadlec	Czech Republic	43
6	Matthieu Ladagnous	France	39
7	Vasil Kiryienka	Belarus	39
8	Peter Schep	Netherlands	32
9	Juan Esteban Curuchet	Argentina	28
10	Oleksandr Polivoda	Ukraine	5
11	Wong Kam-po	Hong Kong	5
12	Alexander Äschbach	Switzerland	4
13	Jens-Erik Madsen	Denmark	2
14	Makoto Iijima	Japan	8
15	Andreas Graf	Austria	19
16	Vladimir Tuychiev	Uzbekistan	20
17	Ioannis Tamouridis	Greece	20
DNF	Carlos Alzate	Colombia	21
DNF	David O'Loughlin	Ireland	22
DNF	Daniel Oss	Italy	23
DNF	Hayden Roulston	New Zealand	24
DNF	Rafał Ratajczyk	Poland	25
