= Revolution (cycling series) Season 1 =

Season 1 of the Revolution cycling series was held during the winter track cycling season of 2003/2004.

The series started out focusing on endurance cycling and added elite sprinting during the first season..

== Competition ==
=== Sprint ===
Elite sprinting made its Revolution Debut as a main feature at Revolution 3, with the cream of British riders taking on the visiting French squad. The event attracted big names like Chris Hoy, Craig MacLean, Jason Queally, Arnaud Tournant, Grégory Baugé and Florian Rousseau. The main sprint competition saw Hoy defeat MacLean in the first Semi-Final and Roussuau defeat Tournant in the other. Hoy was able to turn on the power in the final to become the first Revolution Sprint winner. In the Keirin event Tournant came home first, followed by teammate Baugé. A team Sprint competition completed the sprinting action, with Team GB and France reaching the final after defeating composite teams in the Semi-Finals. The team of Hoy, MacLean and Queally defeated the French team by 0.2 seconds.

Revolution 4 saw the Dutch team provide the opposition for the British riders. Future World Sprint Champion Theo Bos defeated Chris Hoy in the Semi-Finals to set up a meeting with Jamie Staff in the final. Bos took a convincing victory after an early move caught Staff off guard. In the Keirin race Jon Norfolk made an early break for home but was caught by Hoy just before the line for the Scot to take the victory. To complete the sprint action Team GB continued their fine form in the Team sprint competition by defeating the Dutch team of Bos, Teun Mulder and Tim Veldt by over a second.

=== Endurance Competition ===
Endurance racing launched the Revolution series from the first event, which featured GB stars Bradley Wiggins, David Millar, Rob Hayles and Chris Newton. The very first race was a Motor Paced Scratch race, in which the bike pulled off 6 laps from the end of the race. The race was won by Millar on his track debut, assisted by his Cofidis teammate Wiggins. The next event was a pursuit challenge, featuring 6 riders over 3 heats. The final saw Wiggins take on Hayles, an encounter in which Hayles led by 2 seconds at the halfway point. However Wiggins was able to turn this around to take the victory by a margin of 2 seconds. Other victories on the night went to James Notley in the Devil Scratch race, Jon Norfolk in a mixed Keirin Race, Chris Newton in the Points race and Rob Hayles in the Scratch race.

The British Riders returned for Revolution 2 and were joined by several visiting Greek riders and several other foreign riders. Bradley Wiggins won the Motor Paced Scratch race and Pursuit events, while the Greek Ioannis Tamouridis took victory in a 1500m Time Trial competition ahead of Chris Newton. Newton then dominated the Points race, taking the victory ahead of Russell Downing. Austrian Roland Gabber rounded off the evening by winning the Scratch race. Revolution 3 saw a mainly British field fight it out for the honours. Tony Gibb took victory in the opening Motor Paced Scratch race. This was followed by Newton again taking victory in the Points race, from Ed Clancy and Russell Downing. Downing then went on to take victory in main Scratch race to round off the evening.

The final event of the season saw several International riders join the field, including World Champion Franco Marvulli. However it was veteran Malcolm Elliott who took a very popular victory in the opening Motor Paced Scratch race. Pursuit World Champion Bradley Wiggins then took on Paul Manning in a thrilling Pursuit Challenge. Both riders were nip and tuck throughout the race, with Manning taking the victory by 0.020 seconds. Huw Pritchard took victory in the Points Race, followed by him finishing second to crowd favourite Marvulli in the Scratch race. The Revolution exclusive Madison Time Trial event made its debut at Revolution 2 during this first season. The top time of the season was set by the team Wiggins and Marvulli at Revolution 4, with 57.99 being clocked by the duo.

=== Future Stars Series ===
The Future Stars did not run as a points storing competition during the first season, however races were held at each meeting. A number of now established stars competed in the races during the season. Olympic Gold and Silver medalist Jason Kenny and Bronze medalist Steven Burke both took part as did other now familiar names Ben Swift, Adam Blythe, Ian Stannard, Pete Williams and Tom Murray.
