= Tomás Margalef =

Uruguayan cyclist

Personal information
- Born: 17 November 1977 (age 48) Paysandú, Uruguay

Cycling career
- Sport: Cycling

Tomás Agustín Margalef Dolara (born 17 November 1977) is a Uruguayan cyclist. He competed in the Men's madison at the 2004 Summer Olympics.
