= Samuele Marzoli =

Italian cyclist

Personal information
- Born: 1 March 1984 (age 42) Fiorenzuola d'Arda, Italy

Cycling career
- Sport: Cycling
- Current team: Retired
- Disciplines: Road and track
- Role: Rider

Amateur teams
- 2003: Bottoli Artoni
- 2008: NGC–Pagnoncelli–Perrel

Professional teams
- 2004–2005: Lampre
- 2006–2007: Team LPR
Medal record
Representing Italy
Men's track cycling
European U23 Track Championships
Gold medal – first place	2003 Moscow	Scratch
Bronze medal – third place	2004 Valencia	Madison
Bronze medal – third place	2005 Fiorenzuola	Madison
European Junior Track Championships
Silver medal – second place	2001 Fiorenzuola	Sprint

Samuele Marzoli (born 1 March 1984) is an Italian former professional road and track cyclist.

== Major results ==
=== Road ===
2005
2nd Giro della Provincia di Reggio Calabria
7th Memorial Cimurri
2007
7th GP Kranj
2008
1st Coppa Caivano
3rd Circuito del Porto
3rd Coppa Colli Briantei Internazionale
6th Coppa San Geo

=== Track ===
2001
2nd Sprint, European Junior Track Championships
2003
1st Scratch, European Under–23 Track Championships
National Track Championships

1st Madison (with Marco Villa)
1st Scratch

2004
1st Six Days of Fiorenzuola (with Giovanni Lombardi)
3rd Madison, European Under–23 Track Championships
2005
2nd Six Days of Fiorenzuola (with Marco Villa
3rd Madison, European Under–23 Track Championships
2006
2nd Six Days of Fiorenzuola ( with Marc Hester)
