= Ronde van Zeeland Seaports =

Dutch one-day road cycling race

Race details
- Date: June (2012–2014); March (2015)
- Region: Zeeland, Netherlands
- English name: Tour of Zeeland Seaports
- Local name(s): Ronde van Zeeland Seaports (in Dutch)
- Discipline: Road
- Competition: UCI Europe Tour
- Type: One-day race
- Organiser: Stichting Zeeuws Wielerweekend

History
- First edition: 2012
- Editions: 4 (as of 2015)
- First winner: Reinardt Janse van Rensburg (RSA)
- Most wins: No repeat winners
- Most recent: Iljo Keisse (BEL)

Ronde van Zeeland Seaports is a single-day road bicycle race held annually in Zeeland, Netherlands. The race was created in 2012, as a 1.1 race on the UCI Europe Tour, after financial issues curtailed the Delta Tour Zeeland stage-race, which had been held since 2008. The first race was won by South African rider Reinardt Janse van Rensburg of the MTN–Qhubeka team.

The first three editions of the race were held in June, but for the 2015 edition, the race was moved to March. After 2015, the race was no longer held, but in 2017 was replaced with its spiritual successor, the Tacx Pro Classic.

== Winners ==
Year	Country	Rider	Team
2012	South Africa	Reinardt Janse van Rensburg	MTN–Qhubeka
2013	Germany	André Greipel	Lotto–Belisol
2014	Netherlands	Theo Bos	Belkin Pro Cycling
2015	Belgium	Iljo Keisse	Etixx–Quick-Step
