= Mattia Viel =

Italian cyclist

Personal information
- Born: 22 April 1995 (age 31) Turin, Italy
- Height: 1.8 m (5 ft 11 in)
- Weight: 72 kg (159 lb)

Cycling career
- Sport: Cycling
- Current team: Retired
- Disciplines: Road; Track; Gravel
- Role: Rider

Amateur teams
- 2014–2015: Chambéry CF
- 2015: Androni Giocattoli–Sidermec (stagiaire)

Professional teams
- 2016–2017: Unieuro–Wilier
- 2018: Holdsworth
- 2019–2021: Androni Giocattoli–Sidermec
- 2022–2023: D'Amico–UM Tools

Mattia Viel (born 22 April 1995) is an Italian former cyclist, who competed as a professional from 2016 to 2023.

== Major results ==
2012
7th Trofeo comune di Vertova Memorial Pietro Merelli
9th Gran Premio dell'Arno
2017
9th La Popolarissima
10th Trofeo Città di Brescia
2018
1st Six Days of Turin (with Nick Yallouris)
