= Revolution (cycling series) – Season 13 =

Revolution Season 13
- Thirteenth edition of the Revolution

Details
- Dates: 14 August 2015 – 23 January 2016
- Location: Derby, Manchester, London and Glasgow
- Races: 6

Season 13 of the Revolution series was held from August 2015 to January 2016 at velodromes in Derby, Manchester, London and Glasgow. It consisted of 6 rounds. The opening round in Derby was a special Olympic qualification event with an extended race program across four sessions in three days. The Revolution Elite Championship took place from Round 2 onward.

== Rounds ==
Round	Date	Location	Venue
1	14–16 August 2015	Derby	Derby Arena
2	24 October 2015	Manchester	Manchester Velodrome
3	14 November 2015	London	Lee Valley VeloPark
4	28 November 2015	Glasgow	Sir Chris Hoy Velodrome
5	2 January 2016	Manchester	Manchester Velodrome
6	23 January 2016	Manchester	Manchester Velodrome

== Championship standings ==
As of round 3 of 5

Position	Team	R2	R3	Total
1	Team PedalSure	97	109	206
2	Maloja Pushbikers RT	83	83	166
3	Orica–GreenEDGE	31	85	116
4	Team Sky	62	44	106
5	Team Wiggins	76	29	105
6	JLT-Condor	66	38	104
7	ONE Pro Cycling	31	64	95
8	VCUK	48	40	88
9	Telegraph Allstars	26	52	78
10	Team USN	22	40	62
11	Team Scotland	46	15	61
12	The Nab Racing	21	11	32

== Round 1 ==
Round 1 of Season 13 was a special Olympic qualification event for track riders to gain UCI qualification points ahead of Rio 2016. National teams competed, including those representing Great Britain, Austria and the Netherlands. The results did not count towards the final Revolution championship standings. Reigning Olympic champions including Bradley Wiggins (Road Time Trial) and Jason Kenny (Team Sprint and Sprint) competed in Round 1.

== Round 2 (E53) ==
Round 2 was the first time the Revolution series featured on Eurosport. It was also the start of this season's Revolution Elite Championship and HOY Future Stars competitions.

=== Start List ===
Position	Team	Riders
1; 2	Team Sky	(Italy) Elia Viviani (United Kingdom) Ian Stannard
3; 4	Maloja Pushbikers	(Germany) Christian Grasmann (Germany) Marcel Kalz
5; 6	JLT-Condor	(Netherlands) Yoeri Havik (United Kingdom) Ollie Wood
7; 8	Team Wiggins	(United Kingdom) Bradley Wiggins (United Kingdom) Owain Doull
9; 10	Team USN	(United Kingdom) Joe Holt (United Kingdom) Matt Bostock
11; 12	ONE Pro Cycling	(Denmark) Marc Hester (Netherlands) Pim Ligthart
13; 14	Team Scotland	(United Kingdom) Mark Stewart (United Kingdom) Angus Claxton
15; 16	The Nab Racing	(United Kingdom) Alistair Rutherford (United Kingdom) Reece Wood
17; 18	Orica–GreenEDGE	(United Kingdom) Adam Blythe (Australia) Glenn O'Shea
19; 20	Telegraph All Stars	(United Kingdom) Germain Burton (United Kingdom) Melvin Van Zilj
21; 22	VCUK	(United Kingdom) Chris Latham (United Kingdom) Chris Lawless
23; 24	Team PedalSure	(United Kingdom) Andy Tennant (Belgium) Iljo Keisse

=== EV2 Flying Lap ===
Position	Rider	Team	Time
1	Ollie Wood	JLT-Condor	00:13.692
2	Marcel Kalz	Maloja Pushbikers	00:13.821
3	Elia Viviani	Team Sky	00:14.080
4	Chris Latham	VCUK	00:14.094
5	Andy Tennant	Team PedalSure	00:14.112
6	Joe Holt	Team USN	00:14.364
7	Angus Claxton	Team Scotland	00:14.379
8	Owain Doull	Team Wiggins	00:14.762
9	Marc Hester	ONE Pro Cycling	00:14.933
10	Adam Blythe	Orica–GreenEDGE	00:14.939
11	Alistair Rutherford	The Nab Racing	00:14.941
12	Melvin Van Zilj	Telegraph All Stars	00:15.042

=== EV8 Points Race (30km) ===
Only list the first 10 riders

Position	Rider	Team	Points
1	Elia Viviani	Team Sky	69
2	Iljo Keisse	Team PedalSure	62
3	Mark Stewart	Team Scotland	57
4	Christian Grasmann	Maloja Pushbikers	48
5	Marc Hester	ONE Pro Cycling	25
6	Pim Ligthart	ONE Pro Cycling	14
7	Andy Tennant	Team PedalSure	6
8	Adam Blythe	Orica–GreenEDGE	5
9	Bradley Wiggins	Team Wiggins	3
10	Alistair Rutherford	The Nab Racing	1

=== EV11 Scratch Race (15km) ===
Only list the first 10 riders

Position	Rider	Team
1	Andy Tennant	Team PedalSure
2	Bradley Wiggins	Team Wiggins
3	Ollie Wood	JLT-Condor
4	Elia Viviani	Team Sky
5	Mark Stewart	Team Scotland
6	Yoeri Havik	JLT-Condor
7	Christian Grasmann	Maloja Pushbikers
8	Alistair Rutherford	The Nab Racing
9	Matt Bostock	Team USN
10	Reece Wood	The Nab Racing

=== EV14 Madison Time Trial ===
Position	Team
1	Maloja Pushbikers
2	Team PedalSure
3	Team Wiggins
4	VCUK
5	Telegraph All Stars
6	JLT-Condor
7	Orica–GreenEDGE
8	Team Scotland
9	Team Sky
10	Team USN
11	ONE Pro Cycling
12	The Nab Racing

=== EV20 Team Elimination ===
Position	Team
1	Team Wiggins
2	Team PedalSure
3	VCUK
4	Maloja Pushbikers
5	ONE Pro Cycling
6	JLT-Condor
7	Telegraph All Stars
8	Orica–GreenEDGE
9	The Nab Racing
10	Team Scotland
11	Team Sky
12	Team USN

=== Result of Round 2 ===
Position	Team	Points
1	Team PedalSure	97
2	Maloja Pushbikers RT	83
3	Team Wiggins	76
4	JLT-Condor	66
5	Team Sky	62
6	VCUK	48
7	Team Scotland	46
8	Orica–GreenEDGE	31
9	ONE Pro Cycling	31
10	Telegraph Allstars	26
11	Team USN	22
12	The Nab Racing	21

== Round 3 (E54) ==
=== Start List ===
Position	Team	Riders
1; 2	Team Sky	(United Kingdom) Geraint Thomas (United Kingdom) Peter Kennaugh
3; 4	Maloja Pushbikers	(Germany) Christian Grasmann (Germany) Marcel Kalz
5; 6	JLT–Condor	(Republic of Ireland) Felix English (United Kingdom) Joey Walker
7; 8	WIGGINS	(United Kingdom) Chris Lawless (United Kingdom) Conor Davies
9; 10	Team USN	(United Kingdom) Joe Holt (United Kingdom) Matt Bostock
11; 12	ONE Pro Cycling	(Denmark) Marc Hester (Brazil) Gideoni Rodrigues
13; 14	Team Scotland	(United Kingdom) Angus Claxton (United Kingdom) Peter Anderson
15; 16	The Nab Racing	(United Kingdom) Alistair Rutherford (United Kingdom) Julian Pearson
17; 18	Orica–GreenEDGE	(United Kingdom) Adam Blythe (Australia) Scott Law
19; 20	Telegraph All Stars	(Belgium) Jasper de Buyst (Belgium) Otto Vergaerde
21; 22	VCUK	(Switzerland) Tristan Marguet (United Kingdom) Ethan Hayter
23; 24	Team PedalSure	(Belgium) Iljo Keisse (Netherlands) Wim Stroetinga

=== EV2 Flying Lap ===
Position	Rider	Team	Time
1	Marcel Kalz	Maloja Pushbikers	00:13.739
2	Scott Law	Orica–GreenEDGE	00:13.796
3	Wim Stroetinga	Team PedalSure	00:14.033
4	Jasper de Buyst	Telegraph All Stars	00:14.096
5	Tristan Marguet	VCUK	00:14.128
6	Chris Lawless	WIGGINS	00:14.146
7	Felix English	JLT–Condor	00:14.146
8	Gideoni Rodrigues	ONE Pro Cycling	00:14.218
9	Joe Holt	Team USN	00:14.245
10	Angus Claxton	Team Scotland	00:14.441
11	Julian Pearson	The Nab Racing	00:14.964
12	Peter Kennaugh	Team Sky	00:15.445

=== EV6 Points Race (30km) ===
Only list the first 10 riders

Position	Rider	Team	Points
1	Iljo Keisse	Team PedalSure	44
2	Peter Kennaugh	Team Sky	38
3	Jasper de Buyst	Telegraph All Stars	10
4	Christian Grasmann	Maloja Pushbikers	9
5	Chris Lawless	WIGGINS	8
6	Marcel Kalz	Maloja Pushbikers	6
7	Felix English	JLT–Condor	3
8	Marc Hester	ONE Pro Cycling	2
9	Matt Bostock	Team USN	0
10	Wim Stroetinga	Team PedalSure	0

=== EV11 Scratch Race (15km) ===
Only list the first 10 riders

Position	Rider	Team
1	Scott Law	Orica–GreenEDGE
2	Iljo Keisse	Team PedalSure
3	Gideoni Rodrigues	ONE Pro Cycling
4	Geraint Thomas	Team Sky
5	Ethan Hayter	VCUK
6	Christian Grasmann	Maloja Pushbikers
7	Joe Holt	Team USN
8	Wim Stroetinga	Team PedalSure
9	Adam Blythe	Orica–GreenEDGE
10	Felix English	JLT-Condor

=== EV14 Madison Time Trial ===
Position	Team	Time
1	Maloja Pushbikers	00:56.232
2	Orica–GreenEDGE	00:56.871
3	Telegraph All Stars	00:57.660
4	Team PedalSure	00:58.016
5	ONE Pro Cycling	00:58.199
6	Team USN	00:58.835
7	JLT–Condor	00:59.278
8	VCUK	00:59.483
9	Team Scotland	01:01.368
10	WIGGINS	01:01.825
11	The Nab Racing	01:02.205
12	Team Sky	01:02.556

=== EV20 Team Elimination ===
Position	Team
1	Team PedalSure
2	ONE Pro Cycling
3	Maloja Pushbikers
4	Orica–GreenEDGE
5	JLT–Condor
6	Team USN
7	Team Sky
8	The Nab Racing
9	WIGGINS
10	VCUK
11	Team Scotland
12	Telegraph All Stars

=== Results ===
Position	Team	Points
1	Team PedalSure	109
2	Orica–GreenEDGE	85
3	Maloja Pushbikers RT	83
4	ONE Pro Cycling	64
5	Telegraph Allstars	52
6	Team Sky	44
7	Team USN	40
8	VCUK	40
9	JLT–Condor	38
10	WIGGINS	29
11	Team Scotland	15
12	The Nab Racing	11
