= René Savary =

Swiss cyclist

Personal information
- Born: 12 October 1949 (age 77) Oberriet, Switzerland

Cycling career
- Sport: Cycling
- Disciplines: Road; Track

Professional teams
- 1973: Möbel Märki–Bonanza
- 1973: Sonolor
- 1974: Zonca
- 1974: Willner–Birr–Brugg
- 1975: Filotex
- 1976: Möbel Buob
- 1977: Bianchi–Campagnolo
- 1977: Diggelmann–Velo Maier
- 1977: Jelmoli–Hugo Koblet rad
- 1978: Willora–Mairag–Piz Buin
- 1979–1980: Kondor

René Savary (born 12 October 1949) is a Swiss former cyclist. He competed in the team pursuit event at the 1972 Summer Olympics.

== Major results ==
1971
1st Points race, National Track Championships
1972
1st Points race, National Track Championships
1975
1st Omnium, National Track Championships
10th GP du canton d'Argovie
1976
1st Stayer, National Track Championships
1st Tour du Nord-Ouest
1st Stage 4b (ITT) Tour de Suisse
1977
1st Stayer, National Track Championships
1978
1st Stayer, National Track Championships
1st Six Days of Zürich (with René Pijnen)
1979
1st Stage 2 Tour de Suisse
1st Stage 2 Deutschland Tour
3rd Visp–Grachen
