= Erik Weispfennig =

German bicycle racer

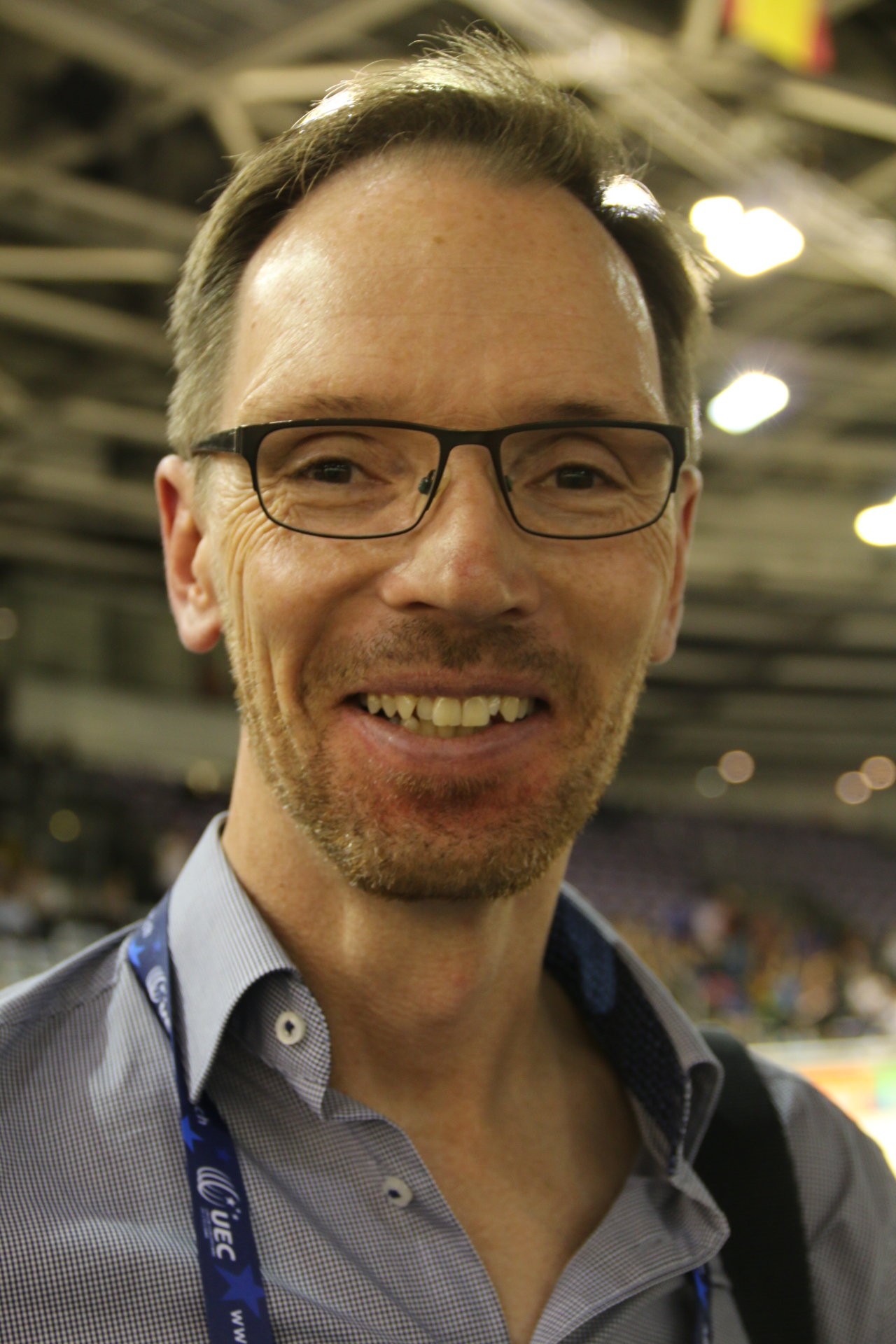
- Weispfennig in 2017

Personal information
- Born: 13 August 1969 (age 57) Iserlohn, Germany

Cycling career
- Sport: Cycling
- Discipline: Track
- Role: Rider
Medal record
Representing France
Men's track cycling
UCI Track World Championships
Gold medal – first place	2000 Manchester	Madison

Erik Weispfennig (born 13 August 1969 in Iserlohn) is a German former track cyclist. He won the madison at the 2000 UCI Track Cycling World Championships with Stefan Steinweg.

After retiring, Weispfennig worked as a directeur sportif for Team Nutrixxion–Sparkasse from 2006 until 2010. In April 2019, he became the vice president of the German Cycling Federation.
