= Petr Lazar =

Czech cyclist

Personal information
- Born: 2 July 1976 (age 50) Brno, Czech Republic

Cycling career
- Sport: Cycling
- Current team: Retired
- Disciplines: Track; Road
- Role: Rider

Professional teams
- 2003: ASC Dukla Praha
- 2005–2007: ASC Dukla Praha
Medal record
Representing Czech Republic
Men's track cycling
World Championships
Bronze medal – third place	2007 Palma de Mallorca	Madison
European Championships
Silver medal – second place	2005 Dalmine	Madison
Bronze medal – third place	2004 Valencia	Omnium
Bronze medal – third place	2006 Ballerup	Madison

Petr Lazar (born 2 July 1976) is a Czech former professional racing cyclist. He competed in the men's Madison at the 2004 Summer Olympics.

== Major results ==
2004
1st Madison, Manchester (with Martin Bláha), UCI Track World Cup
3rd Omnium, UEC European Track Championships
5th Overall International Tour of Hellas

1st Stages 3 & 4

2005
1st Team pursuit, National Track Championships
2nd Madison (with Martin Bláha), UEC European Track Championships
2006
3rd Madison (with Alois Kaňkovský), UEC European Track Championships
2007
3rd Madison (with Alois Kaňkovský), UCI Track World Championships
3rd Six Days of Turin (with Alois Kaňkovský)
2008
1st Madison, National Track Championships
2009
3rd Six Days of Fiorenzuola (with Alois Kaňkovský)
