= Jozef Žabka =

Slovak cyclist (born 1975)

Personal information
- Born: 28 January 1975 (age 51) Bratislava, Czechoslovakia

Cycling career
- Sport: Cycling

Jozef Žabka (born 28 January 1975) is a Slovak cyclist. He competed in the Men's madison at the 2004 Summer Olympics.
