= Sebastián Donadío =

Argentine cyclist

Sebastian Donadio
Personal information
- Born: 5 January 1972 (age 54)

Cycling career
- Sport: Cycling
- Discipline: Track cycling
- Role: Rider
- Rider type: madison

Sebastian Donadio (born 5 January 1972) is an Argentine male track cyclist, riding for the national team. He competed in the madison event at the 2010 and 2011 UCI Track Cycling World Championships.
