= Giovanni Lombardi (cyclist) =

Italian cyclist

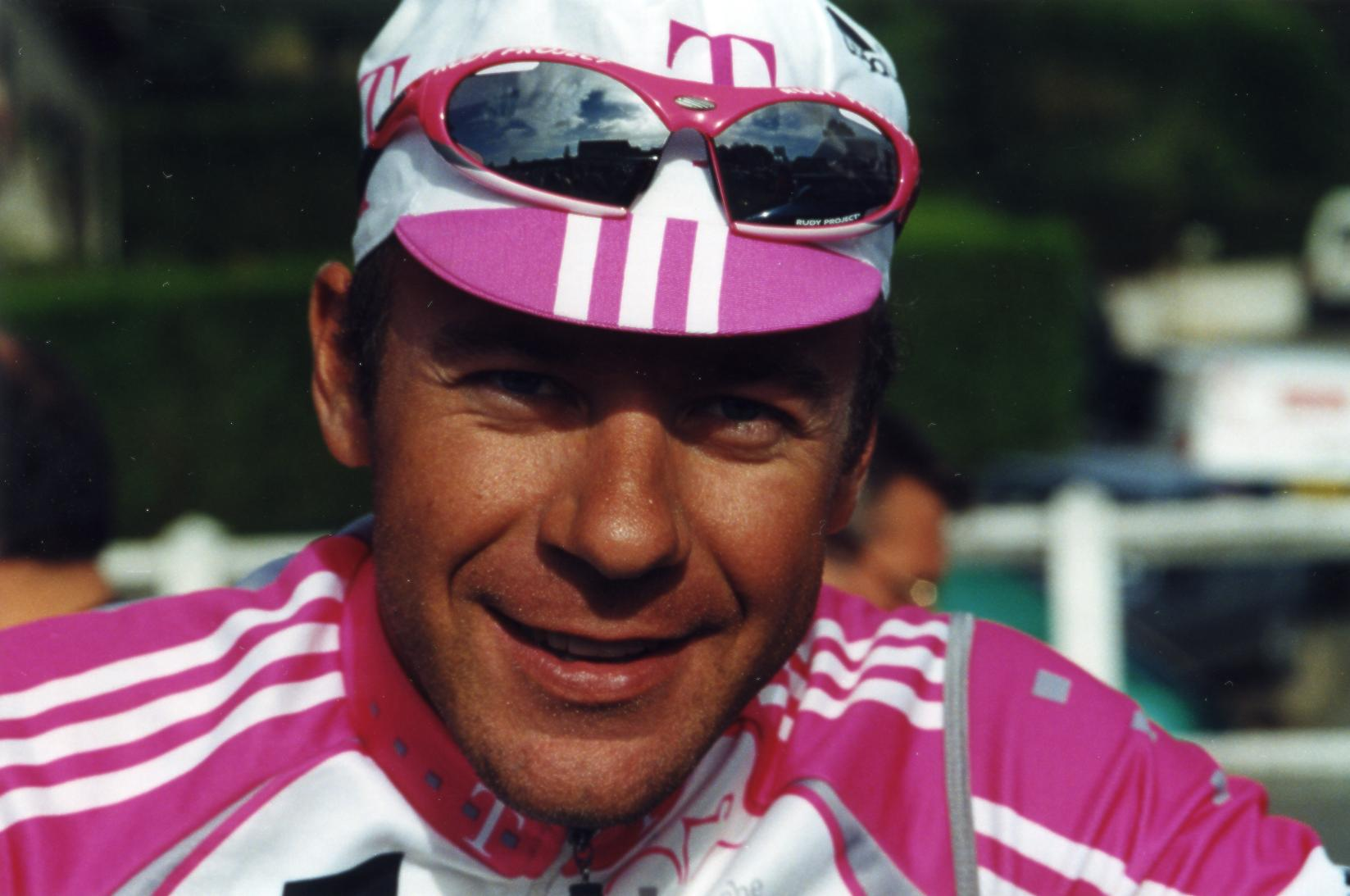
- Lombardi in 1998

Personal information
- Full name: Giovanni Lombardi
- Born: 20 June 1969 (age 57) Pavia, Italy
- Height: 1.78 m (5 ft 10 in)
- Weight: 73 kg (161 lb; 11 st 7 lb)

Cycling career
- Sport: Cycling
- Disciplines: Road and track
- Role: Rider
- Rider type: Sprinter

Professional teams
- 1992-1994: Lampre
- 1995-1996: Polti
- 1997-2001: Telekom
- 2002: Acqua e Sapone
- 2003-2004: Domina Vacanze
- 2005-2006: Team CSC

Major wins
- Grand Tours Giro d'Italia 4 individual stages (1995, 1996, 2002, 2003) Vuelta a España 2 individual stages (1998, 2002)
Medal record
Men's track cycling
Representing Italy
Olympic Games
Gold medal – first place	1992 Barcelona	Point's race

Giovanni Lombardi (born 20 June 1969) is an Italian former professional road bicycling racer who raced from 1992 to 2006. He started his career as a sprinter, winning multiple stages in the Giro d'Italia. He went on to ride as an important helper for the top sprinter names of Erik Zabel and Mario Cipollini. Most recently, he rode for Team CSC as a helper for Ivan Basso. Lombardi was also an active track racer during wintertime, and has participated in many six-day races, frequently as a partner of Marco Villa. He also competed at the 1988 Summer Olympics and the 1992 Summer Olympics, winning a gold medal at the latter.

== Biography ==
Lombardi was born in Pavia (Lombardy). In 1992 he became a pro with the Lampre team. Lombardi's speciality is the bunch sprint, which he already proved in his early pro-years. Among other wins, he won a stage in the 1993 Midi Libre and the year after two stages in both Tour de Suisse and Vuelta a Murcia. He also came in second in three different stages of the Giro d'Italia during his years at Lampre.

In 1995, his first year of service in the Polti team, he finally won a Giro d'Italia stage, as well as another stage win in Tour de Suisse. A year later he yet again won a stage in the Giro, as well as one in Ronde van Nederland.

Despite his victories, Lombardi still stood in the shadow of the great sprinters of his generation, such as Erik Zabel and Mario Cipollini. For this reason Lombardi chose to cash in on his talent by relocating to Telekom in 1997. Here his job was to prepare the sprint for Erik Zabel, by guiding Zabel through the peloton. In his first year in the team, he missed out on the peak of the cycling season, Tour de France, as the team wanted to ride for Jan Ullrich's chances in the general classement. During his time at Telekom, however, Lombardi gathered a healthy list of honours, including stage triumphs in Volta a Catalunya, Tour of Austria, Bicicleta Vasca and Tirreno–Adriatico, as well as a stage in the 1998 Vuelta a España, Ronde van Nederland, Vuelta a Burgos and Danmark Rundt.

In 2002, Lombardi returned to his native country, to drive in the service of Cipollini at the Acqua e Sapone and Domina Vacanze teams. Beside working hard in the last kilometres of the races for Cipollini, Lombardi himself still won stages in the Giro (two times), the Vuelta, Tour de Romandie and Vuelta a Aragón.

Before the 2005 season, he left Cipollini and went to the Danish Team CSC. Lombardi became the only rider of the peloton to participate and complete all three grand tours of the 2005 season, riding the Giro and Tour de France for team captain Ivan Basso as well as the Vuelta for Carlos Sastre. He used his great experience of towing Zabel and Cipollini around the peloton to keep Basso in the right place and avoid crashes for his captain.

== Major results ==
1992
Olympics Points Race

1993
Stage 1, Midi Libre
Stage 1 and Stage 4, Hofbräu Cup

1994
Stage 2 and Stage 10, Tour de Suisse
Stage 1 and Stage 3, Vuelta a Murcia

1995
Stage 22, Giro d'Italia
Stage 7, Tour de Suisse

1996
Stage 3, Giro d'Italia
Stage 3, Ronde van Nederland
Stage 4, Giro di Puglia
Stage 2, Giro di Calabria

1997
Stage 4, Tirreno–Adriatico
Stage 6, Ronde van Nederland
Stage 1, Bicicleta Vasca
Stage 2 and Stage 5, Danmark Rundt

1998
Stage 7, Vuelta a España
Stage 6, Tirreno–Adriatico

1999
Stage 4, Bicicleta Vasca
Stage 4, Regio-Tour
Stage 3, Tour of Austria

2000
Stage 5 and Stage 6, Volta a Catalunya
Stage 3, Vuelta a Burgos
Stage 1, Bicicleta Vasca
Stage 5, Vuelta a Aragón
Stage 1 and Stage 7, Tour of Austria

2002
Stage 6, Giro d'Italia
Stage 13, Vuelta a España
Stage 1 and Stage 3, Tour de Romandie
Stage 5, Vuelta a Aragón
Stage 3, Tour Méditerranéen

2003
Stage 20, Giro d'Italia
