= Isaac Gálvez =

Spanish cyclist (1975–2006)

- Gálvez during the 2005 Tour de France

Personal information
- Full name: Isaac Gálvez López
- Born: 20 May 1975 Vilanova i la Geltrú, Spain
- Died: 26 November 2006 (aged 31) Ghent, Belgium

Cycling career
- Sport: Cycling
- Disciplines: Road and track
- Role: Rider
- Rider type: Road: sprinter Track: madison

Professional teams
- 2000–2003: Kelme–Costa Blanca
- 2004–2006: Illes Balears-Banesto

Major wins
- Clásica de Almería (2000)
Medal record
Men's track cycling
Representing Spain
World Championships
Gold medal – first place	1999 Berlin	Madison
Gold medal – first place	2006 Bordeaux	Madison
Silver medal – second place	2000 Manchester	Madison
Silver medal – second place	2001 Antwerp	Madison

Isaac Gálvez López (Note: In this Spanish name, the first or paternal surname is Gálvez and the second or maternal family name is López.) (20 May 1975 in Vilanova i la Geltrú, Spain – 26 November 2006 in Ghent) was a Spanish track and road racing cyclist who rode for Caisse d'Epargne-Illes Balears in the UCI ProTour. He died during the 66th Six Days of Ghent cycling event in Belgium after colliding with Dimitri De Fauw and crashing against the railing. He died from internal bleeding. At the time of the accident, he had only been married for three weeks. After this, De Fauw suffered from depression and he committed suicide on 6 November 2009.

After the second stage of the 2007 edition of the Vuelta a Murcia was cancelled due to strong winds, the organisers dedicated the day's prizes to Gálvez in his memory. Gálvez's sister Débora Gálvez is also a racing cyclist.

Gálvez competed for Spain at the 2000 Summer Olympics.

== Major results ==
1999
1st Madison (with Joan Llaneras), UCI Track World Championships
2000
1st Clásica de Almería
2001
1st Stage GP dos Mosqueteiros
1st Stage Volta ao Alentejo
2002
1st Trofeo Mallorca
2003
1st Trofeo Mallorca
1st Trofeo Alcudia
1st Stage Setmana Catalana de Ciclisme
1st Stage Volta a Catalunya
2005
1st Stage Critérium International
2006
1st Madison (with Joan Llaneras), UCI Track World Championships
1st Trofeo Mallorca
1st Trofeo Alcudia
1st Stage Four Days of Dunkirk
