= Andreas Beikirch =

German professional cyclist

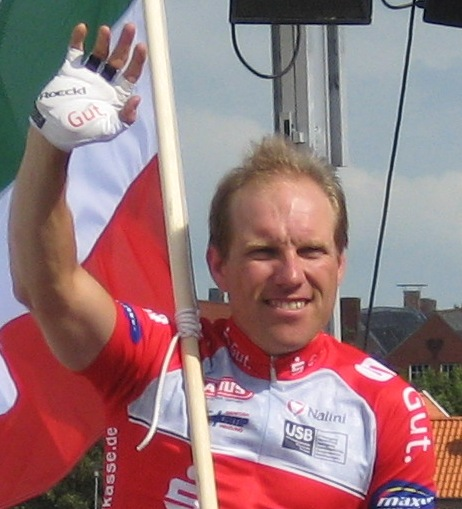
- Andreas Beikirch

Personal information
- Born: 29 March 1970 (age 56) Hilden, Germany

Cycling career
- Sport: Cycling
- Role: Rider

Andreas Beikirch (born 29 March 1970 in Hilden, North Rhine-Westphalia) is a German professional racing cyclist.

== Career wins ==
1988 - World Championship, Track, Points race, Juniors
1990 - Nouméa, Six Days (FRA)
1996 - Aalsmeer (NED)
1999 - Stage 3 Niedersachsen Rundfahrt, Soltau (GER)
1999 - Stage 1 Tour de Beauce, Saint-Georges (CAN)
2000 - National Championship, Track, Madison, Elite, Germany (GER)
2000 - Erlangen (GER)
2001 - Köln-Nippes (GER)
2001 - Kaarst-Büttgen (GER)
2001 - Dortmund (c) (GER)
2001 - Michelstadt (GER)
2001 - Gelsenkirchen (GER)
2001 - Radevormwald (GER)
2001 - Dortmund (b) (GER)
2002 - Dortmund, Six Days (GER)
2002 - Neuss, Criterium (GER)
2002 - Köln-Vogelsang (GER)
2002 - Gelsenkirchen (GER)
2002 - Rund um Jülich (GER)
2003 - European Championship, Track, Madison, Elite
2003 - Dortmund (b) (GER)
2003 - Köln-Longerich (GER)
2003 - Nordhorn (GER)
2003 - Bochum-Steinkuhl (GER)
2003 - Gelsenkirchen (b) (GER)
2003 - Kleve (GER)
2003 - City Night Hamm (GER)
2003 - Nettetal-Breyell (GER)
2003 - Dortmund-Hombruch (b) (GER)
2003 - Kempen (GER)
2004 - Stuttgart, Six Days (GER)
2004 - Neuss (b) (GER)
2004 - Titz-Rödingen (GER)
2004 - Dortmund (b) (GER)
2004 - Bochum (b) (GER)
2004 - Gelsenkirchen (GER)
2004 - Dortmund (d) (GER)
2004 - Nettetal-Breyell (GER)
2004 - Dortmund-Brackel (b) (GER)
2005 - Bremen, Six Days (GER)
2005 - Krefeld (GER)
2005 - Bocholt (GER)
2005 - Bochum (b) (GER)
2005 - Grosser Preis der WAZ (GER)
2005 - Schermbeck (GER)
2005 - Weilheim (GER)
2005 - Mönchengladbach (GER)
2005 - Bochum, Derny (GER)
2006 - Stage 2 part c Gelsen-Net Tour (GER)
2006 - Emmerich (GER)
2006 - National Championship, Track, Madison, Elite, Germany (GER)
2007 - Stage 3 Gelsen-Net Tour (GER)
2007 - Stage 2 Rheinberg (GER)
