= Danny Stam =

Dutch racing cyclist

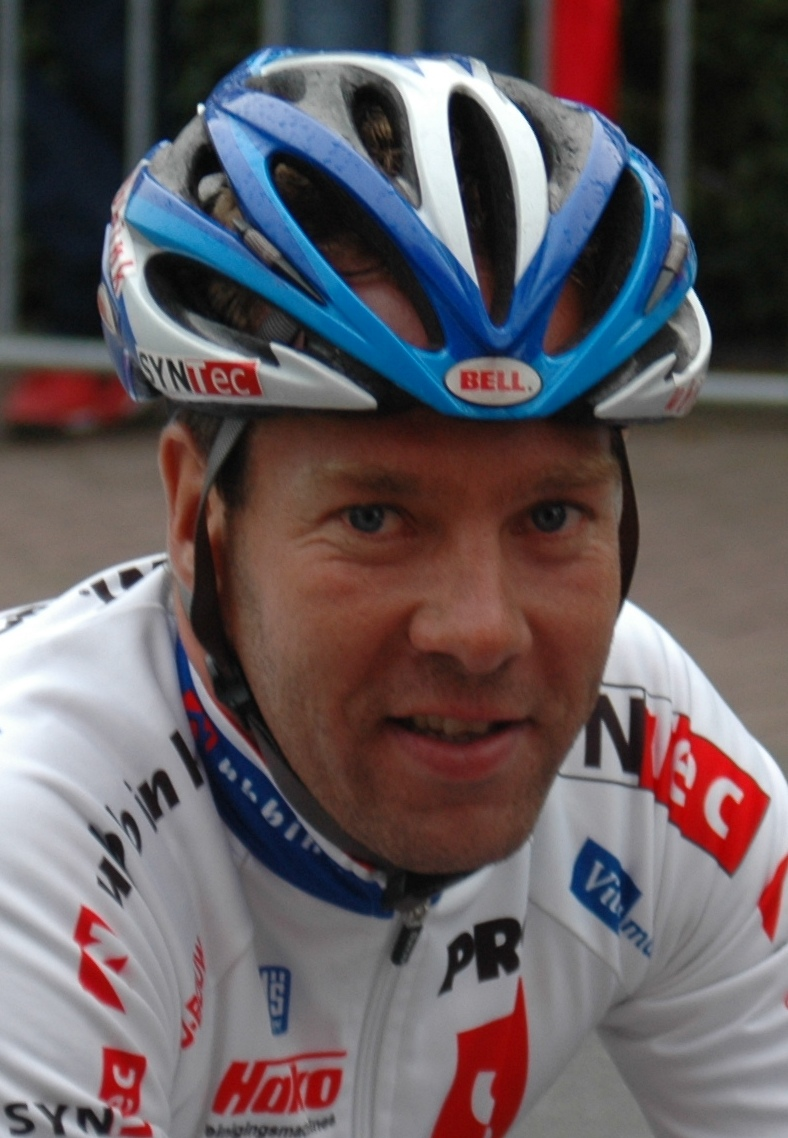

Personal information
- Full name: Danny Stam
- Nickname: De kleine diesel
- Born: 25 June 1972 (age 54) Koog aan de Zaan, Netherlands

Cycling career
- Sport: Cycling
- Current team: Team SD Worx–Protime
- Disciplines: Road; Track
- Role: Directeur sportif; Rider (former)
- Rider type: Six-day racing Madison

Professional teams
- 1999–2008: Axa Cycling Teamet–Gazelle
- 2009–2011: AA Cycling Team

Managerial teams
- 2013–2020: Boels–Dolmans
- 2021–: SD Worx

Major wins
- European Champion madison 2002; 9 Six-day cycling events
Medal record
Men's track cycling
Representing Netherlands
World Championships
| Silver medal – second place | 2005 Los Angeles | Madison |
| Silver medal – second place | 2007 Palma de Mallorca | Madison |
| Bronze medal – third place | 2004 Melbourne | Madison |
European Championships
| Gold medal – first place | 2002 Amsterdam | Madison |
| Silver medal – second place | 2003 Amsterdam | Madison |
| Silver medal – second place | 2006 Ballerup | Madison |
| Bronze medal – third place | 2009 Ghent | Madison |

Danny Stam (born 25 June 1972) is a Dutch former racing cyclist, who specialised in Six-day racing track cycling. He is nicknamed "De kleine diesel" (The little diesel). He currently works as a directeur sportif for UCI Women's WorldTeam Team SD Worx–Protime.

== Biography ==
Born in Koog aan de Zaan, Stam started cycling at the team of his father and four-time world champion track cyclist Cees Stam. He participated in both road cycling as well as track cycling. On the road his main skills became visible in the mountain stages, but after being part of the Rabobank talent team for a few years he did not break through to the professional team. As a result, he decided to mainly focus his career on track cycling.

His first notable result among the elite riders came in 1996 when he won the Dutch national title behind the derny. It would take him four more years to win another national title. This time he won the madison title alongside his partner Robert Slippens. The year 2000 turned out to be his final breakthrough year. Besides his second national title he also won a silver medal behind the derny and two bronze medals at the points race and 50-kilometre (31-mile) time trial. Later that year Stam and Slippens represented the Netherlands at the 2000 Summer Olympics in Sydney where they took the 8th spot.

In 2001 Stam and Slippens had their first top three ranking during a Six-day cycling event, finishing third in Amsterdam. A year later they promoted their ranking into a second place. That same year they became the European Champions at the Madison beating Bruno Risi and Kurt Betschart for the gold. He also won another national silver medal at the points race. Their first Six-day racing win Stam and Slippens also achieved in Amsterdam, where they again beat Risi and Betschart in 2003. In addition they also won the Six-day cycling event of Bremen and finished second in Moscow and Ghent. They were unable to successfully defend their European title in madison, but their second place behind Andreas Kappes and Andreas Beikirch was good enough for a silver medal.

They qualified themselves for the World Championships in 2004 and won the bronze medal. They were ready for their second Olympic spell, but at the 2004 Summer Olympics in Athens they did not get further than the 14th spot because they were a lap behind. Afterwards they recovered quick by winning their second Amsterdam title, their second Dutch madison title as well as their first six-day win in Ghent and Rotterdam in early 2005. Later in 2005 they won another silver medal at the World Championships at the madison in Los Angeles behind Mark Cavendish and Robert Hayles. Their most successive year to date was 2006 when they won the six-day events of Rotterdam, Bremen, Berlin and Copenhagen together. Due to an injury Slippens was ruled out and Stam started to ride with several other riders. With Peter Schep he claimed the victory in the Amsterdam event and they also won the silver medal at the European Championships in Ballerup. Alongside Jens Mouris he won a World Cup madison event in Moscow, all in 2006. While at the World Championships 2007 in Palma de Mallorca he and Schep won another silver medal.

In 2008 Stam started in the Six-day event of Rotterdam again together with Slippens, but he had to withdraw after one day. Because Leif Lampater's teammate Andreas Beikirch also got injured Stam and Lampater were riding together starting at day 2 of the event, chasing the leading three teams by 2 laps. Eventually they won the event with a lap in advantage of the rest of the pack.

In 2010 Stam joined the leontien.nl cycling team, and remained with the team in 2011, transitioning from being a rider to a team director. In 2013 Stam joined Boels–Dolmans as team manager. In 2021, Boels–Dolmans became SD Worx, and the team was promoted to UCI Women's Team status.

== Career highlights ==
UCI Track World Championships
2004 – Melbourne, 3rd, Madison (with Robert Slippens)
2005 – Los Angeles, 2nd, Madison (with Robert Slippens)
2007 – Palma de Mallorca, 2nd, Madison (with Peter Schep)

UCI Track Cycling World Cup Classics
2002 – Sydney, 3rd, Madison (with Robert Slippens)
2003 – Moscow, 2nd, Madison (with Robert Slippens)
2006 – Moscow, 1st, Madison (with Jens Mouris)

European Championships
2002 – 1st, Madison (with Robert Slippens)
2003 – 2nd, Madison (with Robert Slippens)
2006 – Ballerup, 2nd, Madison (with Peter Schep)

Dutch National Track Championships
1991 – 3rd, Derny race (amateurs)
1996 – 1st, Derny race
2000 – 1st, Madison (with Robert Slippens)
2000 – 2nd, Derny race
2000 – 3rd, Points race
2000 – 3rd, 50 km time trial
2002 – 2nd, Points race
2004 – 3rd, Points race
2004 – 1st, Madison (with Robert Slippens)
2005 – 2nd, 50 km time trial

Six-day cycling events
2001 – Amsterdam, 3rd (with Robert Slippens)
2002 – Amsterdam, 2nd (with Robert Slippens)
2003 – Amsterdam, 1st (with Robert Slippens)
2003 – Moscow, 2nd (with Robert Slippens)
2003 – Bremen, 1st (with Robert Slippens)
2003 – Ghent, 2nd (with Robert Slippens)
2004 – Bremen, 2nd (with Robert Slippens)
2004 – Amsterdam, 1st (with Robert Slippens)
2004 – Munich, 2nd (with Robert Slippens)
2004 – Ghent, 1st (with Robert Slippens)
2005 – Rotterdam, 1st (with Robert Slippens)
2005 – Berlin, 3rd (with Robert Slippens)
2005 – Copenhagen, 2nd (with Robert Slippens)
2005 – Amsterdam, 2nd (with Robert Slippens)
2005 – Munich, 2nd (with Robert Slippens)
2005 – Ghent, 2nd (with Robert Slippens)
2006 – Rotterdam, 1st (with Robert Slippens)
2006 – Bremen, 1st (with Robert Slippens)
2006 – Berlin, 1st (with Robert Slippens)
2006 – Copenhagen, 1st (with Robert Slippens)
2006 – Hasselt, 2nd (with Robert Slippens)
2006 – Maastricht, 3rd (with Peter Schep)
2006 – Amsterdam, 1st (with Peter Schep)
2006 – Dortmund, 3rd (with Andreas Beikirch)
2006 – Munich, 3rd (with Peter Schep)
2007 – Rotterdam, 2nd (with Marco Villa)
2007 – Stuttgart, 3rd (with Peter Schep and Olaf Pollack)
2007 – Copenhagen, 3rd (with Peter Schep)
2007 – Amsterdam, 2nd (with Robert Slippens)
2007 – Munich, 3rd (with Robert Slippens)
2007 – Ghent, 3rd (with Robert Slippens)
2008 – Zürich, 3rd (with Michael Mørkøv)
2008 – Rotterdam, 1st (with Leif Lampater)

Road achievements
1993 – 3rd, PWZ Zuidenveld Tour, Netherlands
1996 – 3rd, Eurode Omloop, Netherlands
2001 – 2nd, Criterium Kustpijl, Belgium
2001 – 2nd, Ronde van Limburg, Netherlands
2001 – 2nd, Rund um Düren, Germany
2007 – 3rd, Ronde van Midden-Brabant, Netherlands
2007 – 1st, Omloop Schokland, Netherlands

== See also ==
- List of Dutch Olympic cyclists
