= Marco Villa =

Italian cyclist (born 1969)

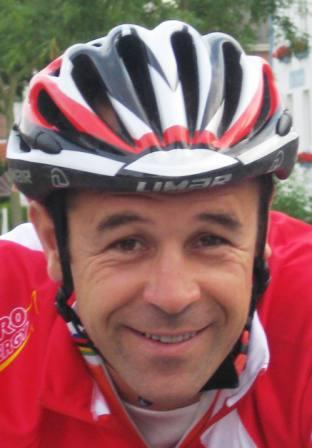
- Villa in 2007

Personal information
- Born: February 8, 1969 (age 57) Abbiategrasso, Italy

Cycling career
- Sport: Cycling
- Current team: Retired
- Disciplines: Track; Road
- Role: Rider

Professional teams
- 1994–1995: Amore & Vita–Galatron
- 1996–1997: Brescialat
- 1998–1999: Cantina Tollo–Alexia Alluminio
- 2000–2002: Alexia Alluminio
- 2003–2004: Formaggi Pinzolo Fiavè
Medal record
Representing Italy
Men's cycling
Olympic Games
Bronze medal – third place	2000 Sydney	Madison
UCI Track World Championships
Gold medal – first place	1995 Bogota	Madison
Gold medal – first place	1996 Manchester	Madison
Silver medal – second place	1997 Perth	Madison
Bronze medal – third place	1989 Lyon	Amateur team pursuit
European Championships
Silver medal – second place	1995 Manchester	Madison
Silver medal – second place	2001 Ghent	Madison
Mediterranean Games
Gold medal – first place	1991 Athens	Road time trial
Gold medal – first place	1991 Athens	Points race

Marco Villa (born February 8, 1969, in Abbiategrasso) is an Italian former professional road and track cyclist. He won the bronze medal in the men's Madison at the 2000 Summer Olympics in Sydney, Australia alongside Silvio Martinello. He was a professional rider from 1993 to 2004.

== Major results ==
=== Track ===
==== Six-day race wins ====
- Six Days of Grenoble: 1995 (with Silvio Martinello); 2002 (with Adriano Baffi)
- Six Days of Bassano del Grappa: 1996 (with Silvio Martinello); 1998 (with Adriano Baffi)
- Six Days of Bordeaux: 1996 and 1997 (with Silvio Martinello)
- Six Days of Bremen: 1996 (with Silvio Martinello)
- Six Days of Milan: 1996, 1997 and 1999 (with Silvio Martinello)
- Six Days of Medellín: 1997 (with Silvio Martinello)
- Six Days of Zurich: 1997 (with Silvio Martinello)
- Six Days of Ghent: 1998 (with Silvio Martinello)
- Six Days of Copenhagen: 1998 (with Silvio Martinello)
- Six Days of Berlin: 1998, 2000 (with Silvio Martinello)
- Six Days of Turin: 2001, 2002, 2004 (with Ivan Quaranta); 2005 (with Sebastian Donadio)
- Six Days of Stuttgart: 2001 (with Silvio Martinello)
- Six Days of Fiorenzuola d'Arda: 2001 (with Ivan Quaranta); 2006 (with Franco Marvulli)
- Six Days of Amsterdam: 2002 (with Silvio Martinello)

=== Road ===
1991
1st Time trial, Mediterranean Games
2nd Circuito del Porto
1994
1st Stage 8 Coca-Cola Trophy
1997
8th Giro dell'Etna
1998
4th Overall Tour of Japan
2000
8th First Union Wilmington Classic
