= Franco Marvulli =

Swiss cyclist (born 1978)

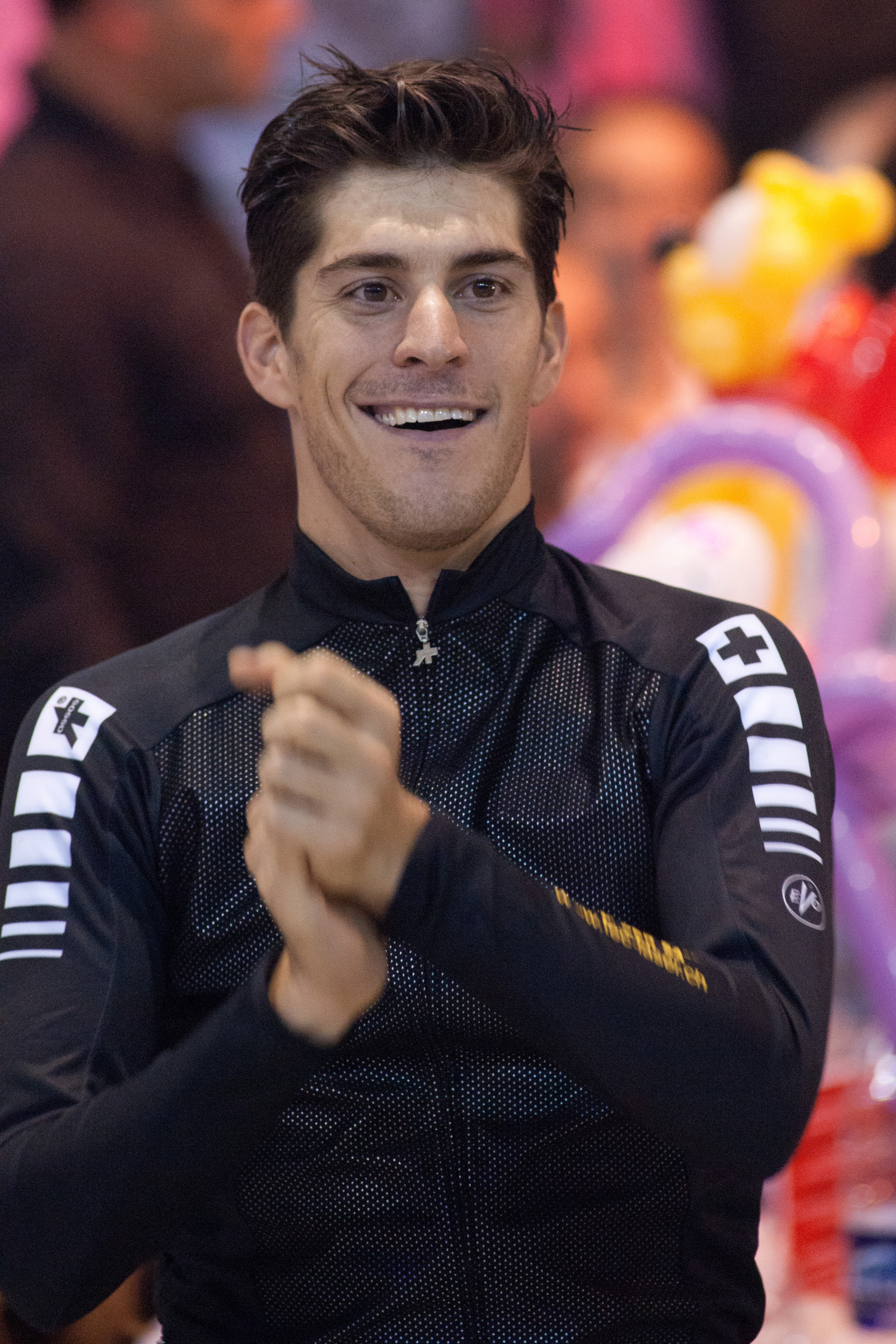

Personal information
- Full name: Franco Marvulli
- Born: 11 November 1978 (age 47) Zürich, Switzerland

Cycling career
- Sport: Cycling
- Disciplines: Track; Road
- Role: Rider
Medal record
Representing Switzerland
Men's track cycling
Olympic Games
Silver medal – second place	2004 Athens	Madison
World Championships
Gold medal – first place	2002 Ballerup	Scratch
Gold medal – first place	2003 Stuttgart	Scratch
Gold medal – first place	2003 Stuttgart	Madison
Gold medal – first place	2007 Palma de Mallorca	Madison
Silver medal – second place	2004 Melbourne	Madison
European Championships
Gold medal – first place	2001 Brno	Omnium
Gold medal – first place	2002 Büttingen	Omnium
Gold medal – first place	2003 Moscow	Omnium
Gold medal – first place	2004 Fiorenzuola	Madison
Gold medal – first place	2006 Ballerup	Madison
Bronze medal – third place	2006 Ballerup	Omnium

Franco Marvulli (born 11 November 1978 in Zürich) is a Swiss former professional racing cyclist. He won a silver medal in the Madison with Bruno Risi at the 2004 Summer Olympics. He was also a two time world champion in both the Madison, also with Bruno Risi, and in the scratch. He was also a successful six-day racer. He retired in January 2014, with his last race being the Six Days of Berlin.

== Major results ==
2000
3rd, National U23 Time Trial Championship
2001
(Europe) European Omnium Champion
1st, Six-Days of Grenoble (with Alexander Äschbach)
2nd, National Pursuit Championship
2002
World Scratch Champion
(Europe) European Omnium Champion
2nd, National Points Race Championship
2003
World Madison Champion (with Bruno Risi)
World Scratch Champion
(Europe) European Omnium Champion
Switzerland Team Pursuit Champion (with Aeschbach/Dunkel/Kammermann)
Switzerland Elimination Champion
Switzerland Pursuit Champion
1st, Six-Days of Grenoble & Moscou (with Alexander Äschbach)
1st, Oberriet
1st, Trois Jours d'Aigle (with Grégory Devaud)
2nd, National Scratch & Points Race Championship
2004
(Europe) European Madison Champion (with Alexander Äschbach)
1st, Six-Days of Grenoble (with Alexander Äschbach)
1st, Seis Horas de Euskadi (with Marco Villa)
1st, Stage 5, Vuelta a El Salvador
1st, Km del Corso Mestre
(silver) , World Madison Championship (with Bruno Risi)
(silver) , Olympic Games, Madison (with Bruno Risi)
2005
1st, Six-Days of Stuttgart (with Bruno Risi & Kurt Betschart)
1st, Prologue & Stages 2 (TTT), 5 & 6, Vuelta a El Salvador
1st, Horgen
1st, Km del Corso Mestre
1st, Cape Argus Sanlam Cycle Tour
2006
(Europe) European Madison Champion (with Bruno Risi)
Switzerland Madison Champion (with Bruno Risi)
1st, Six-Days of Mexico (with Luis Fernando Macias)
1st, Six-Days of Fiorenzuola d' Arda (with Marco Villa)
1st, Six Days of Maastricht (with Bruno Risi)
1st, Six-Days of Grenoble (with Alexander Äschbach)
2007
World Madison Champion (with Bruno Risi)
Switzerland Madison Champion (with Bruno Risi)
1st, Six-Days of Stuttgart (with Bruno Risi & Alexander Äschbach)
1st, Six-Days of Zurich, København, Hasselt, Fiorenzuola d'Arda, Dortmund, München & Zuidlaren (with Risi)
1st, Trois Jours d'Aigle (with Dominique Stark)
2008
1st, Six-Days of Zurich, Berlin, København & Hasselt (with Bruno Risi)
