= Alexander Äschbach =

Swiss cyclist

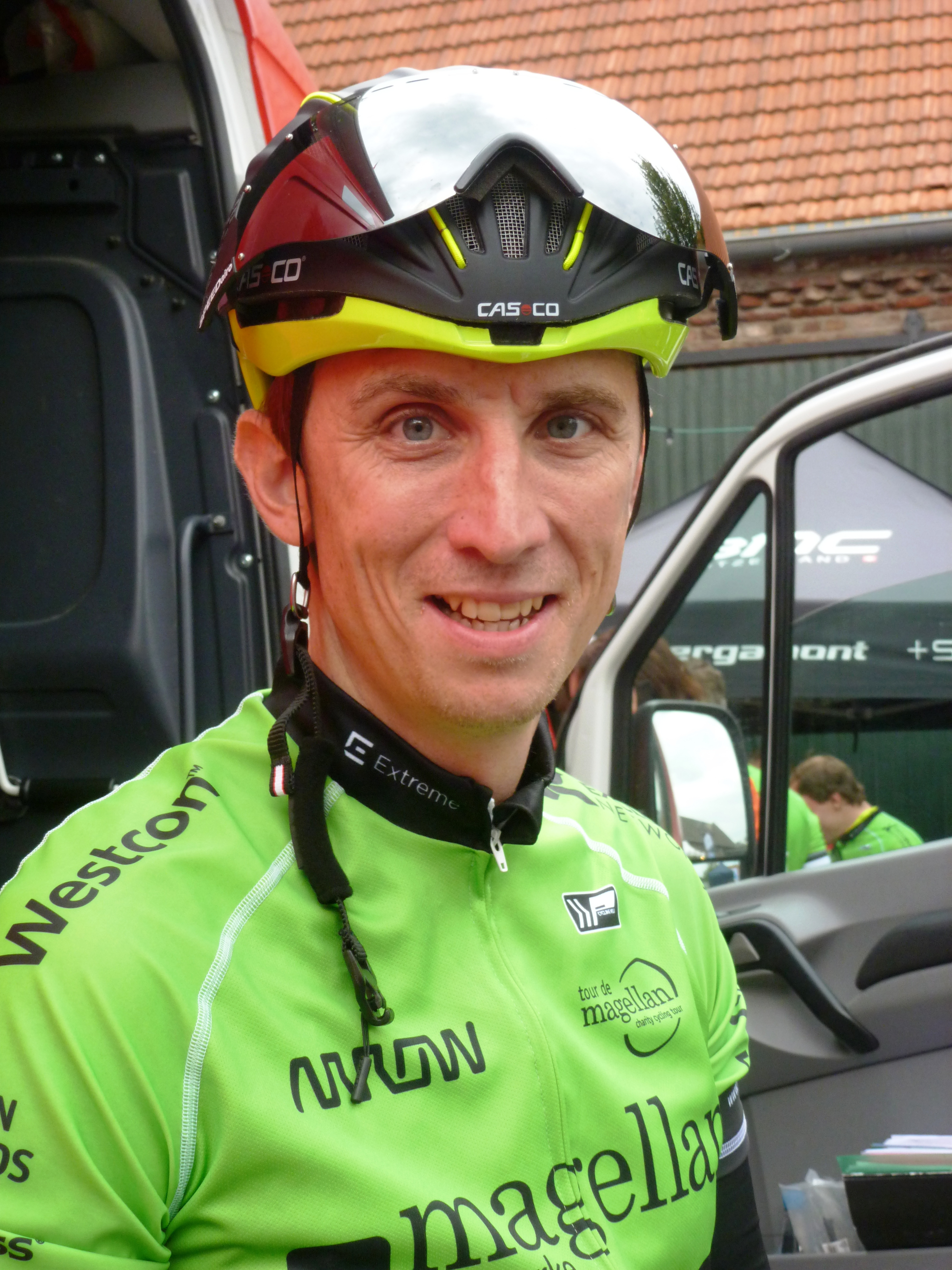
Alexander Aeschbach (2012)

Alexander Äschbach (born 9 June 1974 in Dürrenäsch, Aargau) is a Swiss professional racing cyclist.

== Career wins ==
1993 - National Championship, Track, Team Pursuit, Elite, Switzerland, Zurich (SUI)
1994 - National Championship, Track, Team Pursuit, Elite, Switzerland, Zurich (SUI)
1996 - National Championship, Track, Team Pursuit, Elite, Switzerland, Zürich (SUI)
2001 - National Championship, Track, Pursuit, Elite, Switzerland, Zürich (SUI)
2001 - Grenoble, Six Days (FRA)
2002 - Stage 4 Flèche du Sud, Esch/Alzette (LUX)
2002 - National Championship, Track, Points race, Elite, Switzerland, Zürich (SUI)
2003 - Grenoble, Six Days (FRA)
2003 - Moscou, Six Days (RUS)
2003 - National Championship, Track, Team Pursuit, Elite, Switzerland (SUI)
2003 - Cape Town, Scratch (RSA)
2003 - Stuttgart-Hohenheim (GER)
2004 - European Championship, Track, Madison, Elite, Fiorenzuola
2004 - Trois Jours d'Aigle (SUI)
2004 - Grenoble, Six Days (FRA)
2006 - National Championship, Track, Points race, Elite, Switzerland (SUI)
2006 - Geldern (GER)
2006 - Grenoble, Six Days (FRA)
2007 - Stuttgart, Six Days (GER)
2007 - Eglosheim (GER)
2007 - Aigle, Points race (SUI)
