= Bruno Risi =

Swiss cyclist

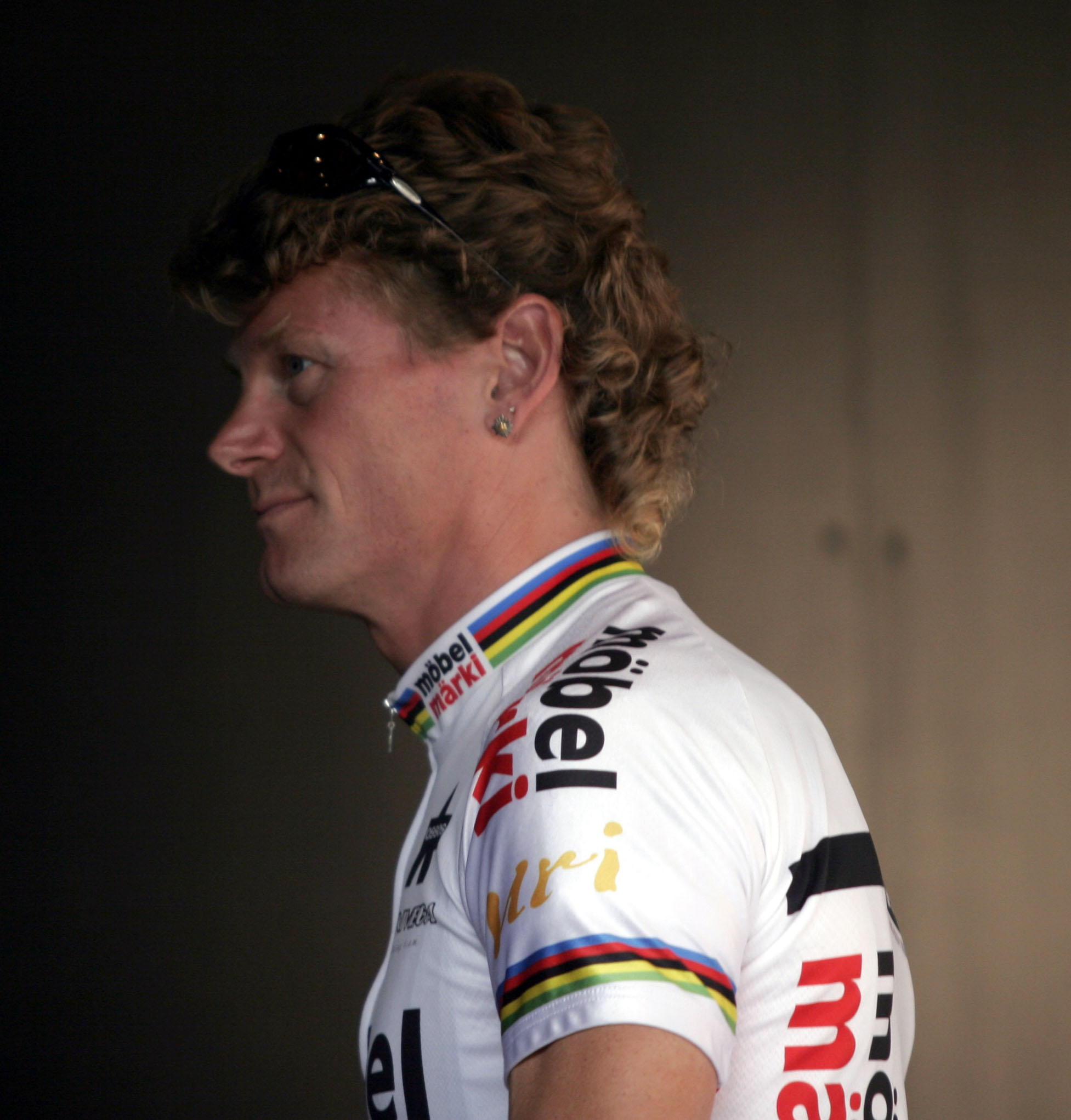

Personal information
- Nickname: Bruno Risi
- Born: 6 September 1968 (age 58) Altdorf, Uri, Switzerland

Cycling career
- Sport: Cycling
- Discipline: Track
- Role: Rider
- Rider type: Endurance (Madison)
Medal record
Representing Switzerland
Men's track cycling
Olympic Games
Silver medal – second place	2004 Athens	Madison
World Championships
Gold medal – first place	2003 Stuttgart	Madison
Gold medal – first place	2007 Palma de Mallorca	Madison
Silver medal – second place	2004 Melbourne	Madison
Bronze medal – third place	1995 Bogotá	Madison

Bruno Risi (born 6 September 1968) is a retired Swiss professional racing cyclist. He competed at five Olympic Games.

Risi was one of the top six-day riders of his generation; he won many professional Madison events during his long career.

He is the ninth Swiss sportsperson to compete at five Olympics (1988, 1996/2008), after middle-distance runner Paul Martin, equestrians Henri Chammartin and Gustav Fischer, javelin thrower Urs von Wartburg, equestrian Christine Stückelberger, and Alpine skier Paul Accola, shooter Gabriele Bühlmann, and equestrian Markus Fuchs.

== Palmares ==
1990
1st, Stage 5a, Circuit Franco-Belge, Wasquehal
(silver) World Amateur Points Race Championship
1991
World Amateur Points Race Champion
1st, Giro del Lago Maggiore -GP Knorr-
1st, Tour du Lac Léman
1992
World Points Race Champion
1st, Six-Days of Dortmund (with Kurt Betschart)
2nd, Overall, Niederösterreich Rundfahrt
1993
1st, Six Days' of Dortmund, Ghent & Munich (with Kurt Betschart)
2nd, National Team Pursuit Championship (with Betschart/Büchler/Gisler)
1994
World Points Race Champion
1st, Six-Days' of København & Munich (with Kurt Betschart)
2nd, Omloop Wase Scheldeboorden
1995
(Europe) European Madison Champion (with Kurt Betschart)
1st, Six-Days' of Bremen & Cologne (with Kurt Betschart)
(bronze) World Madison Championship (with Kurt Betschart)
1996
1st, Six-Days' of Ghent & København (with Kurt Betschart)
(silver) European Madison Championship (with Kurt Betschart)
2nd, National Team Pursuit Championship (with Betschart/Gisler/Strüby)
1997
1st, Six-Days' of Dortmund, Leipzig & Munich (with Kurt Betschart)
(silver) World Points Race Championship
(silver) European Madison Championship (with Kurt Betschart)
1998
1st, Six-Days' of Munich, Stuttgart & Herning (with Kurt Betschart)
1st, Six-Days of Fiorenzuola d'Arda (with Giovanni Lombardi)
1999
World Points Race Champion
1st, Six-Days' of Bremen & Dortmund (with Kurt Betschart)
2000
Switzerland Points Race Champion
1st, Six-Days of Munich (with Kurt Betschart)
1st, Elgger Radomnium
1st, Schorndorf
(bronze) European Madison Championship (with Kurt Betschart)
2001
World Points Race Champion
1st, Weil-am-Rhein & Osnabrück
1st, Osnabrück, Derny
(bronze) European Madison Championship (with Kurt Betschart)
2002
1st, Six-Days' of Bremen, Ghent & Stuttgart (with Kurt Betschart)
1st, Weil-am-Rhein, Osnabrück & Sindelfingen – Schleife
(silver) European Madison Championship (with Kurt Betschart)
2003
World Madison Champion (with Franco Marvulli)
Switzerland Scratch Champion
1st, Six-Days' of Berlin, Dortmund & Munich (with Kurt Betschart)
1st, Bruckmühl, Schaffhausen & Wangen
1st, Holzkirchen (with Thomas Höß)
2nd, National Elimination Championship
(bronze) European Madison Championship (with Kurt Betschart)
2004
1st, Six-Days of Bremen (with Kurt Betschart)
1st, Ruggell, Bottrop-Kirchhellen, Dachau & Steinhagen
(silver) Olympic Games, Madison (with Franco Marvulli)
(silver) World Madison Championship (with Franco Marvulli)
2005
1st, Six-Days of Stuttgart (with Kurt Betschart & Franco Marvulli)
1st, Six-Days' of Berlin & Amsterdam (with Kurt Betschart)
1st, Trois Jours d'Aigle (with Maxime Bally)
1st, Geldern
2006
(Europe) European Madison Champion (with Franco Marvulli)
Switzerland Madison Champion (with Franco Marvulli)
1st, Six-Days' of Dortmund & Munich (with Erik Zabel)
1st, Six Days of Maastricht (with Franco Marvulli)
2007
World Madison Champion (with Franco Marvulli)
Switzerland Madison Champion (with Franco Marvulli)
1st, Six-Days of Stuttgart (with Franco Marvulli & Erik Zabel)
1st, Six-Days' of Zurich, København, Hasselt, Dortmund, Fiorenzuola d'Arda, Munich & Zuidlaren (with Marvulli)
1st, Six-Days of Bremen (with Alexander Äschbach)
1st, Gelsenkirchen, Bruckmühl & Hasle-Ruegsau
1st, Stage 1, Rheinberg
1st, Stage 2, Emmerich
1st, Stage 3, Schermbeck
2008
1st, Six-Days' of Zurich, Berlin, København & Hasselt (with Franco Marvulli)

== See also ==
- List of athletes with the most appearances at Olympic Games
