= Matthew Gilmore =

Belgian cyclist

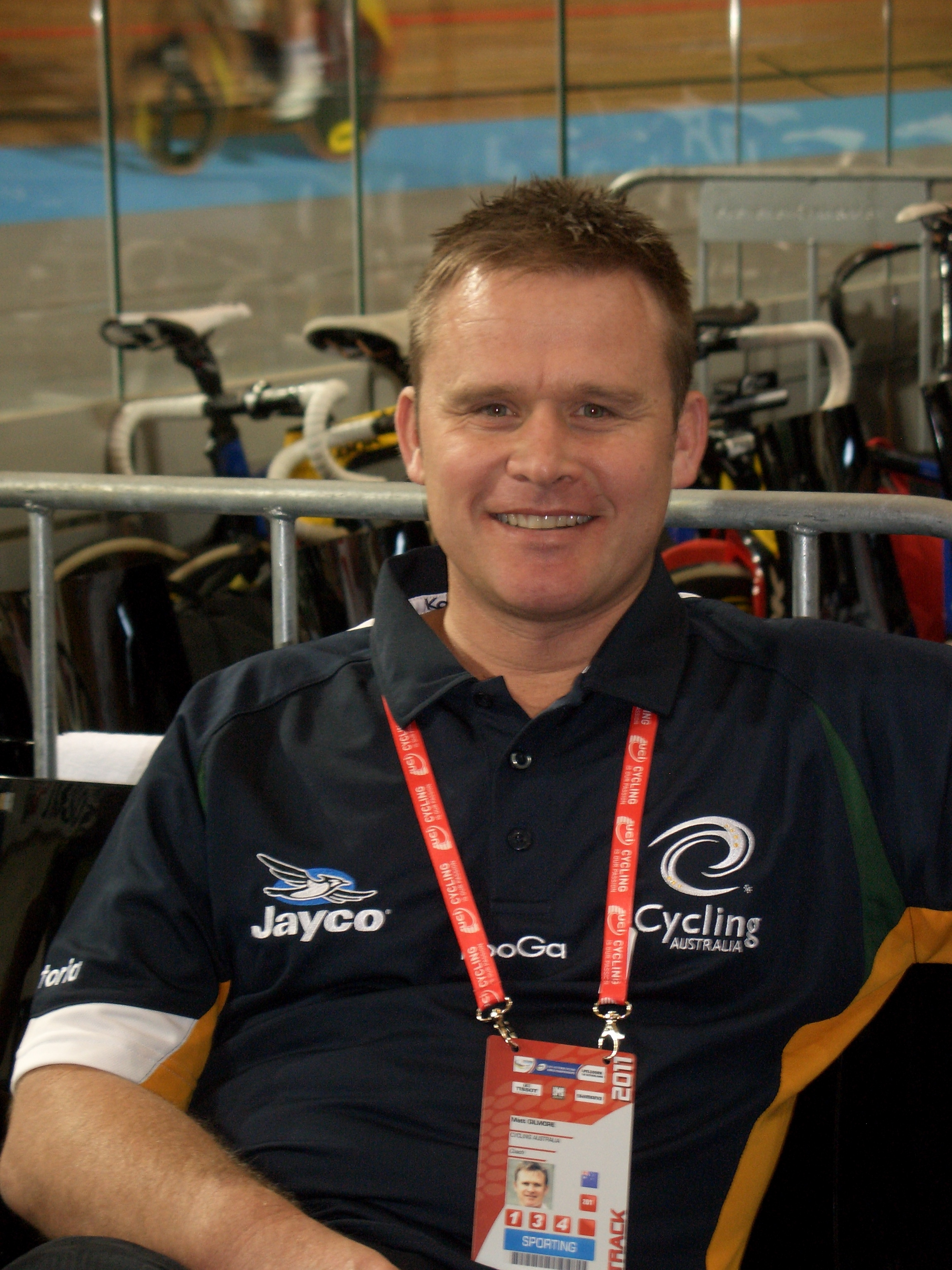
- Gilmore in 2011

Personal information
- Full name: Matthew Gilmore
- Born: 11 September 1972 (age 54) Ghent, Belgium

Cycling career
- Sport: Cycling
- Current team: Retired
- Discipline: Track
- Role: Rider

Professional teams
- 1996–1999: RDM
- 2000: Memory Card–Jack & Jones
- 2001: Vlaanderen–T Interim
- 2002: Mapei–Quick Step
- 2003–2007: Chocolade Jacques
Medal record
Representing Belgium
Men's track cycling
Olympic Games
Silver medal – second place	2000 Sydney	Madison

Matthew Gilmore (born 11 September 1972 in Ghent) is a Belgian-Australian retired track cyclist, who mostly competed and was most successful on track for Belgium. Although Gilmore was born in and represented Belgium, he is the son of Australian racing cyclist Graeme Gilmore and competed with an Australian licence earlier in his career, changing to Belgium on 15 June 1998. Gilmore is also the nephew of British racing cyclist Tom Simpson.

At the 2000 Sydney Olympics he won a silver medal in the men's madison event together with Etienne De Wilde. That year, he rode for Danish road bicycle racing Memory Card–Jack & Jones. Before that he rode for SPAR–RDM, and afterwards he changed to Vlaanderen–T Interim.
