= 2014 UCI Track Cycling World Championships – Men's team pursuit =

The Men's team pursuit at the 2014 UCI Track Cycling World Championships was held on 26 February 2014. 52 cyclists from 13 countries participated in the contest. After all teams have contested qualifying, the fastest two squads advanced to the final and raced for the gold medal, while the teams ranked third and fourth, raced for the bronze medal.

== Medalists ==
| Gold | Australia; Glenn O'Shea; Alexander Edmondson; Mitchell Mulhern; Luke Davison; Miles Scotson |
| Silver | Denmark; Casper von Folsach; Lasse Norman Hansen; Rasmus Quaade; Alex Rasmussen |
| Bronze | New Zealand; Aaron Gate; Pieter Bulling; Dylan Kennett; Marc Ryan |

== Results ==
=== Qualifying ===
The qualifying was started at 12:00.

| Rank | Name | Nation | Time | Notes |
|---|---|---|---|---|
| 1 | Casper von Folsach; Lasse Norman Hansen; Rasmus Quaade; Alex Rasmussen | Denmark | 4:00.176 | Q |
| 2 | Glenn O'Shea; Alexander Edmondson; Mitchell Mulhern; Miles Scotson | Australia | 4:01.516 | Q |
| 3 | Artur Ershov; Evgeny Kovalev; Ivan Kovalev; Alexander Serov | Russia | 4:01.615 | Q |
| 4 | Aaron Gate; Pieter Bulling; Dylan Kennett; Marc Ryan | New Zealand | 4:02.056 | Q |
| 5 | Eloy Teruel; Sebastián Mora; David Muntaner; Albert Torres | Spain | 4:02.648 | |
| 6 | Olivier Beer; Théry Schir; Tom Bohli; Stefan Küng | Switzerland | 4:02.934 | |
| 7 | Theo Reinhardt; Maximilian Beyer; Nils Schomber; Kersten Thiele | Germany | 4:04.230 | |
| 8 | Ed Clancy; Owain Doull; Jonathan Dibben; Samuel Harrison | Great Britain | 4:04.419 | |
| 9 | Jasper De Buyst; Kenny De Ketele; Moreno De Pauw; Jonas Rickaert | Belgium | 4:05.423 | |
| 10 | Juan Esteban Arango; Edwin Ávila; Arles Castro; Fernando Gaviria | Colombia | 4:05.751 | |
| 11 | Elia Viviani; Liam Bertazzo; Marco Coledan; Paolo Simion | Italy | 4:06.165 | |
| 12 | Raman Tsishkou; Aleh Ahiyevich; Yauheni Akhramenka; Siarhei Papok | Belarus | 4:08.568 | |
| 13 | Volodymyr Dzhus; Vitaliy Popkov; Vitaliy Shchedov; Maksym Vasilyev | Ukraine | 4:09.709 | |

=== Finals ===
The Finals were started at 20:00.

| Rank | Name | Nation | Time |
|---|---|---|---|
Gold Medal Race
| 1st place, gold medalist(s) | Glenn O'Shea; Alexander Edmondson; Mitchell Mulhern; Luke Davison | Australia | 3:57.907 |
| 2nd place, silver medalist(s) | Casper von Folsach; Lasse Norman Hansen; Rasmus Quaade; Alex Rasmussen | Denmark | 3:59.623 |
Bronze Medal Race
| 3rd place, bronze medalist(s) | Aaron Gate; Pieter Bulling; Dylan Kennett; Marc Ryan | New Zealand | 3:58.989 |
| 4 | Artur Ershov; Evgeny Kovalev; Ivan Kovalev; Alexander Serov | Russia | 4:00.777 |
