= New Zealand at the UCI Track Cycling World Championships =

- IOC code: NZL
- Medals: Gold 0 Silver 0 Bronze 0 Total 0

UCI Track Cycling World Championships appearances (overview)
- Recent: 2009; 2010; 2011; 2012; 2013; 2014; 2015; 2016; 2017; 2018; 2019; 2020; 2021; 2022; 2023; 2024; 2025; 2026

This page is an overview of New Zealand at the UCI Track Cycling World Championships.

== 2015 UCI Track Cycling World Championships ==
New Zealand at the 2015 UCI Track Cycling World Championships
- IOC code: NZL

in Saint-Quentin-en-Yvelines, France 18 February – 22 February 2015
- Competitors: 18
- Medals Ranked 5th: Gold 1 Silver 2 Bronze 1 Total 4

UCI Track Cycling World Championships appearances (overview)
- Overview page Recent: 2009; 2010; 2011; 2012; 2013; 2014; 2015; 2016; 2017; 2018; 2019; 2020; 2021; 2022; 2023; 2024; 2025; 2026

New Zealand competed at the 2015 UCI Track Cycling World Championships in Saint-Quentin-en-Yvelines at the Vélodrome de Saint-Quentin-en-Yvelines from 18 to 22 February 2015. A team of 18 cyclists (7 women, 11 men) was announced to represent the country in the event.

== Results ==
=== Men ===
Name	Event	Result	Rank
Sam Webster	Men's sprint	9.848 (Q),	6
Matt Archibald	Men's 1 km time trial	1:00.470	3rd place, bronze medalist(s)
Simon van Velthooven	Men's 1 km time trial	1:01.157	9
Dylan Kennett	Men's individual pursuit	4:25.388	10
Regan Gough	Men's scratch	—N/a	DNF
Regan Gough	Men's points race	29 points	4
Aaron Gate	Men's omnium	173 points	5
Eddie Dawkins	Men's keirin		2nd place, silver medalist(s)
Sam Webster	Men's keirin		6
Pieter Bulling; Regan Gough	Men's madison	—N/a	DNF
Pieter Bulling; Dylan Kennett; Alex Frame; Marc Ryan	Men's team pursuit	3:56.421 (Q),	1st place, gold medalist(s)
Eddie Dawkins; Ethan Mitchell; Sam Webster	Men's team sprint	42.892 (Q), REL	2nd place, silver medalist(s)

=== Women ===
Name	Event	Result	Rank
Stephanie McKenzie	Women's sprint	11.155 (Q),	20
Katie Schofield	Women's 500 m time trial	34.595	12
Stephanie McKenzie	Women's 500 m time trial	34.722	14
Jaime Nielsen	Women's individual pursuit	3:34.938	7
Georgia Williams	Women's individual pursuit	3:38.731	11
Racquel Sheath	Women's omnium	117 points	10
Rushlee Buchanan	Women's scratch	—N/a	12
Lauren Ellis; Rushlee Buchanan; Jaime Nielsen; Georgia Williams	Women's team pursuit	4:25.406 (Q),	4
Stephanie McKenzie; Katie Schofield	Women's team sprint	33.715	9

== New Zealand at the 2016 UCI Track Cycling World Championships ==
New Zealand at the 2016 UCI Track Cycling World Championships
- IOC code: NZL

in London, United Kingdom 2 March – 6 March 2016
- Competitors: 19 (12 men, 7 women)
- Medals: Gold 1 Silver 0 Bronze 0 Total 1

UCI Track Cycling World Championships appearances (overview)
- Recent: 2009; 2010; 2011; 2012; 2013; 2014; 2015; 2016; 2017; 2018; 2019; 2020; 2021; 2022; 2023; 2024; 2025; 2026

New Zealand competed at the 2016 UCI Track Cycling World Championships at the Lee Valley VeloPark in London, United Kingdom from 2–4 March 2016. A team of 19 cyclists (7 women, 12 men) was announced to represent the country in the event.

== Results ==
=== Men ===
Name	Event	Result	Rank
Ethan Mitchell; Sam Webster; Eddie Dawkins	Men's team sprint	43.096 (q), 43.257	1
Aaron Gate; Pieter Bulling; Dylan Kennett; Nicholas Kergozou	Men's team pursuit		7
Pieter Bulling; Luke Mudgway	Men's madison	1 points (-1 laps down)	11
Sam Webster	Men's sprint		7
Edward Dawkins	Men's sprint		11
Matthew Archibald	Men's 1 km time trial	01:01.718	6
Dylan Kennett	Men's individual pursuit	259.992	7
Edward Dawkins	Men's keirin	—N/a	2
Sam Webster	Men's keirin	—N/a	10
Alex Frame	Men's scratch	—N/a	21
Luke Mudgway	Men's points race	12 points	DNF

=== Women ===
Name	Event	Result	Rank
Natasha Hansen	Women's sprint		5
Natasha Hansen	Women's keirin		17
Lauren Ellis	Women's omnium	143 points	8
Lauren Ellis; Rushlee Buchanan; Jaime Nielsen; Racquel Sheath	Women's team pursuit	04:20.673 (q), 04:20.225 (f)	4
Natasha Hansen; Olivia Podmore	Women's team sprint	33.932	10
