= 2017 UCI Track Cycling World Championships – Men's team pursuit =

Men's team pursuit at the 2017 UCI Track Cycling World Championships
- Venue: Hong Kong Velodrome
- Location: Hong Kong
- Dates: 12–13 April
- Competitors: 76 from 17 nations
- Teams: 17
- Winning time: 3:51.503

Medalists
gold medal	Sam Welsford; Cameron Meyer; Alexander Porter; Nick Yallouris; Kelland O'Brien; Rohan Wight	Australia
silver medal	Regan Gough; Pieter Bulling; Dylan Kennett; Nicholas Kergozou	New Zealand
bronze medal	Simone Consonni; Liam Bertazzo; Filippo Ganna; Francesco Lamon; Michele Scartezzini	Italy

The Men's team pursuit competition at the 2017 World Championships was held on 12 and 13 April 2017.

== Results ==
=== Qualifying ===
The fastest 8 teams qualify for the first round, from which the top 4 remain in contention for the gold medal final and the other 4 for the bronze medal final.

Rank	Name	Nation	Time	Behind	Notes
1	Sam Welsford; Cameron Meyer; Kelland O'Brien; Alexander Porter	Australia	3:50.577		Q, CR
2	Regan Gough; Pieter Bulling; Dylan Kennett; Nicholas Kergozou	New Zealand	3:53.422	+2.845	Q
3	Simone Consonni; Liam Bertazzo; Filippo Ganna; Francesco Lamon	Italy	3:55.755	+5.178	Q
4	Benjamin Thomas; Thomas Denis; Corentin Ermenault; Florian Maitre	France	3:56.357	+5.780	Q
5	Steven Burke; Kian Emadi; Andy Tennant; Oliver Wood	Great Britain	3:58.936	+8.359	q
6	Viktor Manakov; Alexander Evtushenko; Alexey Kurbatov; Sergei Shilov	Russia	3:58.957	+8.380	q
7	Lindsay De Vylder; Kenny De Ketele; Moreno De Pauw; Robbe Ghys	Belgium	3:59.951	+9.374	q
8	Claudio Imhof; Olivier Beer; Frank Pasche; Cyrille Thièry	Switzerland	4:00.480	+9.903	q
9	Szymon Sajnok; Alan Banaszek; Daniel Staniszewski; Adrian Tekliński	Poland	4:02.219	+11.642	
10	Niklas Larsen; Julius Johansen; Frederik Madsen; Casper von Folsach	Denmark	4:02.443	+11.866	
11	Roy Eefting; Dion Beukeboom; Roy Pieters; Jan-Willem van Schip	Netherlands	4:03.273	+12.696	
12	Lucas Liß; Henning Bommel; Kersten Thiele; Theo Reinhardt	Germany	4:03.328	+12.751	
13	Albert Torres; Eloy Teruel; Vicente García de Mateos; Sebastián Mora	Spain	4:03.424	+12.847	
14	Raman Tsishkou; Raman Ramanau; Yauheni Karaliok; Mikhail Shemetau	Belarus	4:03.656	+13.079	
15	Fan Yang; Qin Chenlu; Xue Sia Fei; Yuan Zhong	China	4:04.486	+13.909	
16	Leung Chun Wing; Ko Siu Wai; Leung Ka Yu; Mow Ching Yin	Hong Kong	4:11.086	+20.509	
	Adam Jamieson; Aidan Caves; Jay Lamoureux; Bayley Simpson	Canada	DSQ^{[A]}		

- ^{^{A}} Canada were disqualified for breaching article 3.2.097
- Q = qualified; in contention for gold medal final
- q = qualified; in contention for bronze medal final

=== First round ===
First round heats are held as follows:
Heat 1: 6th v 7th fastest
Heat 2: 5th v 8th fastest
Heat 3: 2nd v 3rd fastest
Heat 4: 1st v 4th fastest

The winners of heats 3 and 4 proceeded to the gold medal final. The remaining 6 teams were ranked on time, from which the top 2 proceeded to the bronze medal final.

Rank	Heat	Name	Nation	Time	Gap	Notes
7	1	Viktor Manakov; Alexander Evtushenko; Vladislav Kulikov; Alexey Kurbatov	Russia	4:00.780		
8	1	Kenny De Ketele; Moreno De Pauw; Robbe Ghys; Gerben Thijssen	Belgium	4:01.727	+0.947	
4	2	Christopher Latham; Mark Stewart; Andy Tennant; Oliver Wood	Great Britain	3:56.796		QB
6	2	Claudio Imhof; Frank Pasche; Loïc Perizzolo; Cyrille Thièry	Switzerland	4:00.405	+3.609	
2	3	Regan Gough; Pieter Bulling; Dylan Kennett; Nicholas Kergozou	New Zealand	3:54.363		QG
3	3	Simone Consonni; Michele Scartezzini; Liam Bertazzo; Filippo Ganna	Italy	3:55.945	+1.582	QB
1	4	Sam Welsford; Kelland O'Brien; Alexander Porter; Rohan Wight	Australia	3:54.125		QG
5	4	Benjamin Thomas; Thomas Denis; Corentin Ermenault; Florian Maitre	France	4:00.198	+6.073	

- QG = qualified for gold medal final
- QB = qualified for bronze medal final

=== Finals ===
The final was held at 19:53.

Rank	Name	Nation	Time	Behind	Notes
Gold medal final
1st place, gold medalist(s)	Sam Welsford; Cameron Meyer; Alexander Porter; Nicholas Yallouris	Australia	3:51.503		
2nd place, silver medalist(s)	Regan Gough; Pieter Bulling; Dylan Kennett; Nicholas Kergozou	New Zealand	3:53.979	+2.476	
Bronze medal final
3rd place, bronze medalist(s)	Simone Consonni; Liam Bertazzo; Filippo Ganna; Francesco Lamon	Italy	3:56.935		
4	Mark Stewart; Steven Burke; Kian Emadi; Oliver Wood	Great Britain	3:58.566	+1.631	
