= 2016 UCI Track Cycling World Championships – Men's team pursuit =

Men's team pursuit at the 2016 UCI Track Cycling World Championships
- Venue: Lee Valley VeloPark, London
- Date: 2–3 March
- Competitors: 68 from 14 nations
- Teams: 14
- Winning time: 3:52.727

Medalists
gold medal	Sam Welsford; Michael Hepburn; Callum Scotson; Miles Scotson; Alexander Porter; Luke Davison	Australia
silver medal	Jonathan Dibben; Ed Clancy; Owain Doull; Bradley Wiggins; Steven Burke; Andy Tennant	Great Britain
bronze medal	Lasse Norman Hansen; Niklas Larsen; Frederik Madsen; Casper von Folsach; Rasmus Quaade	Denmark

The Men's team pursuit event of the 2016 UCI Track Cycling World Championships was held on 2 and 3 March 2016. Australia beat Great Britain in the final to win gold.

== Results ==
=== Qualifying ===
The qualifying was started on 2 March 2016 at 13:00.

Rank	Athletes	Nation	Time	Behind	Notes
1	Jonathan Dibben; Steven Burke; Owain Doull; Bradley Wiggins	Great Britain	3:55.664		Q
2	Sam Welsford; Michael Hepburn; Alexander Porter; Miles Scotson	Australia	3:55.867	+0.203	Q
3	Aaron Gate; Pieter Bulling; Dylan Kennett; Nicholas Kergozou	New Zealand	3:57.050	+1.386	Q
4	Elia Viviani; Liam Bertazzo; Simone Consonni; Francesco Lamon	Italy	3:57.800	+2.136	Q
5	Lasse Norman Hansen; Frederik Madsen; Rasmus Quaade; Casper von Folsach	Denmark	3:59.196	+3.532	Q
6	Leif Lampater; Nils Schomber; Kersten Thiele; Domenic Weinstein	Germany	4:00.127	+4.463	Q
7	Sergei Shilov; Dmitri Sokolov; Dmitrii Strakhov; Kirill Sveshnikov	Russia	4:00.812	+5.148	Q
8	Dion Beukeboom; Roy Eefting; Wim Stroetinga; Jan-Willem van Schip	Netherlands	4:01.847	+6.163	Q
9	Olivier Beer; Silvan Dillier; Frank Pasche; Théry Schir	Switzerland	4:02.066	+6.402	
10	Fan Yang; Liu Hao; Qin Chenlu; Shen Pingan	China	4:03.900	+8.236	
11	Benjamin Thomas; Thomas Denis; Julien Duval; Florian Maitre	France	4:05.102	+9.438	
12	Adam Jamieson; Sean MacKinnon; Rémi Pelletier-Roy; Ed Veal	Canada	4:05.641	+9.977	
13	Julio Amores; Xavier Cañellas; Vicente García de Mateos; Illart Zuazubiskar	Spain	4:09.909	+14.245	
14	Vitaliy Hryniv; Roman Gladysh; Vladyslav Kreminskyi; Taras Shevchuk	Ukraine	4:13.977	+18.313	

=== First round ===
The winners of the first two heats advanced to the final. After that, the results were used to determine the placement rounds. It was started on 3 March 2016 at 15:34.

Rank	Name	Nation	Time	Behind
1 vs 4
1	Steven Burke; Owain Doull; Andy Tennant; Bradley Wiggins	Great Britain	3:54.267	
2	Liam Bertazzo; Simone Consonni; Francesco Lamon; Michele Scartezzini	Italy	3:58.902	+4.635
2 vs 3
1	Sam Welsford; Luke Davison; Michael Hepburn; Miles Scotson	Australia	3:54.029	
2	Aaron Gate; Pieter Bulling; Dylan Kennett; Marc Ryan	New Zealand	4:00.280	+6.251
5 vs 8
1	Lasse Norman Hansen; Niklas Larsen; Frederik Madsen; Casper von Folsach	Denmark	3:54.940	
2	Dion Beukeboom; Roy Eefting; Wim Stroetinga; Jan-Willem van Schip	Netherlands	4:01.651	+6.711
6 vs 7
1	Alexander Serov; Sergei Shilov; Dmitri Sokolov; Kirill Sveshnikov	Russia	3:59.921	
2	Theo Reinhardt; Nils Schomber; Kersten Thiele; Domenic Weinstein	Germany	4:00.032	+0.111

=== Finals ===
The finals were started on 3 March 2016 at 21:45.

Rank	Name	Nation	Time	Behind
Gold medal race
1st place, gold medalist(s)	Sam Welsford; Michael Hepburn; Callum Scotson; Miles Scotson	Australia	3:52.727	
2nd place, silver medalist(s)	Jonathan Dibben; Ed Clancy; Owain Doull; Bradley Wiggins	Great Britain	3:53.856	+1.129
Bronze medal race
3rd place, bronze medalist(s)	Lasse Norman Hansen; Niklas Larsen; Frederik Madsen; Casper von Folsach	Denmark	3:55.936	
4	Elia Viviani; Liam Bertazzo; Simone Consonni; Filippo Ganna	Italy	3:58.262	+2.326
Fifth place race
5	Alexander Serov; Sergei Shilov; Dmitri Sokolov; Kirill Sveshnikov	Russia	3:59.833	
6	Leif Lampater; Theo Reinhardt; Nils Schomber; Kersten Thiele	Germany	4:01.725	+1.912
Seventh place race
7	Aaron Gate; Pieter Bulling; Dylan Kennett; Nicholas Kergozou	New Zealand	3:55.875	
8	Roy Eefting; Wim Stroetinga; Joost van der Burg; Jan-Willem van Schip	Netherlands	4:03.486	+7.611
