= 2014–15 UCI Track Cycling World Cup =

Cycling competition

2014–2015 UCI Track Cycling World Cup
- Twenty-third edition of the UCI Track Cycling World Cup
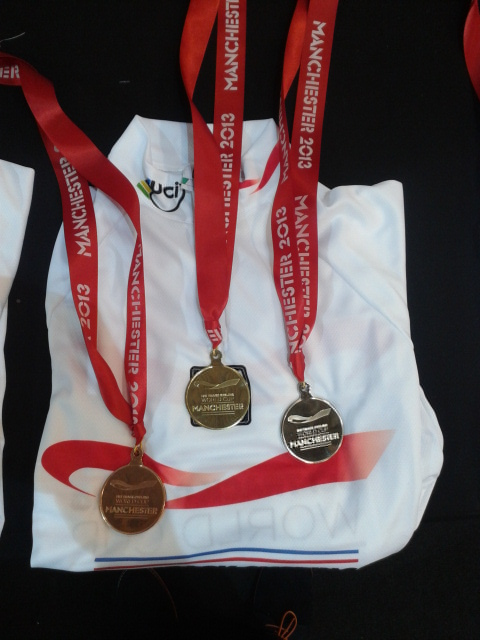
- World Cup medals and jersey

Details
- Dates: 8 November 2014 – 18 January 2015
- Location: Mexico, United Kingdom and Colombia
- Races: 3

The 2014–2015 UCI Track Cycling World Cup was a multi-race tournament over a track cycling season. It was the 23rd series of the UCI Track Cycling World Cup organised by the Union Cycliste Internationale. The series ran from 8 November 2014 to 18 January 2015 and consisted of three rounds in Guadalajara, London, and Cali.

== Series ==
The 2014–2015 UCI Track Cycling World Cup consisted of three rounds, in Guadalajara (Mexico) on 8–9 November 2014, London (United Kingdom) on 5–7 December 2014, and Cali (Colombia) on 17–18 January 2015.

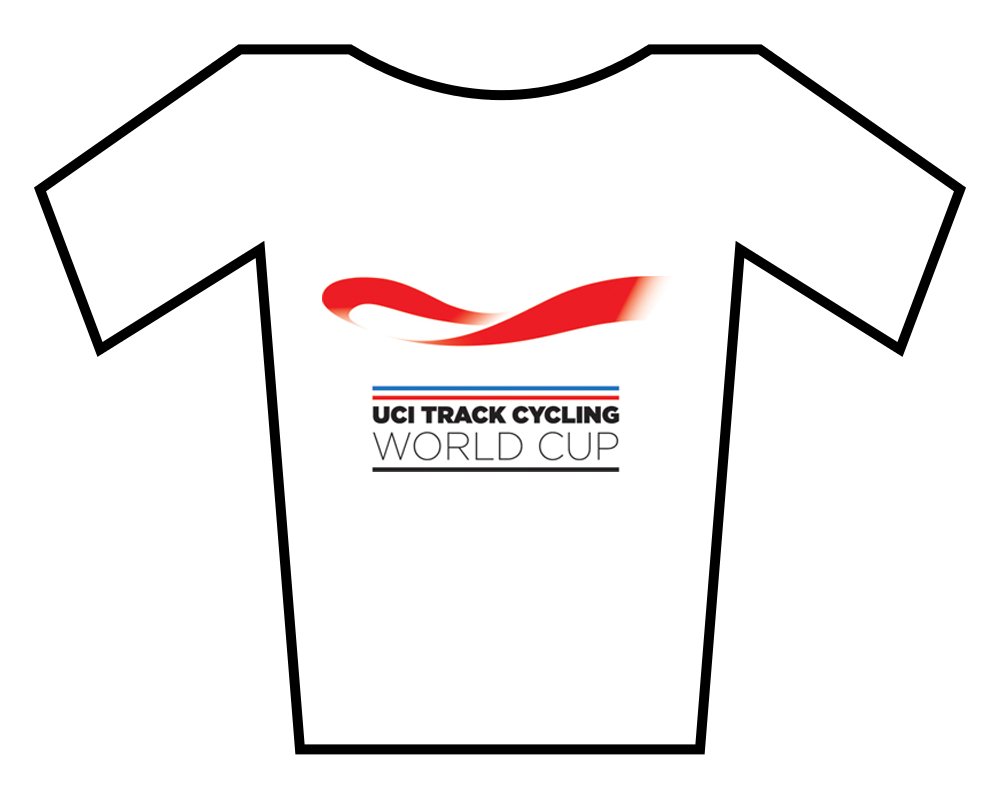
Leaders of each type of track cycling event, contested at the UCI Track World cup had the right to wear the leaders jersey, shown here.

== Overall team standings ==
Overall team standings are calculated based on total number of points gained by the team's riders in each event. The top ten teams after the third and final round are listed below:

Rank	Team	Round 1	Round 2	Round 3	Total Points
1	Germany	1363.5	1609.0	1065.0	4037.5
2	Great Britain	1380.0	1424.0	900.0	3704.0
3	Australia	1450.5	797.0	1151.0	3398.5
4	Netherlands	895.5	1001.0	1289.5	3186.0
5	New Zealand	1068.0	1130.0	825.0	3023.0
6	Russia	1003.0	1070.5	943.0	3016.5
7	China	698.5	1042.0	821.5	2562.0
8	France	639.0	761.5	973.0	2373.5
9	Colombia	791.0	696.0	877.0	2364.0
10	Spain	682.0	515.5	825.0	2022.5

== Results ==
=== Men ===
Event	Winner	Second	Third
Mexico, Guadalajara | 8–9 November 2014
Sprint Details (pdf)	Matthew Glaetzer (AUS); 10.226/10.234	Jason Kenny (GBR) +0.013/+0.009	Fabián Puerta (COL); 10.200/10.201
Team Sprint Details (pdf)	Great Britain; Philip Hindes; Jason Kenny; Callum Skinner; 43.092	Germany; Robert Förstemann; Joachim Eilers; Eric Engler; 43.106	New Zealand; Ethan Mitchell; Sam Webster; Eddie Dawkins; 42.769
Team Pursuit Details (pdf)	Australia; Daniel Fitter; Alexander Porter; Callum Scotson; Sam Welsford; 3:55.976	Great Britain; Jonathan Dibben; Steven Burke; Andy Tennant; Mark Christian; 3:58.129	Switzerland; Silvan Dillier; Stefan Küng; Frank Pasche; Théry Schir; 3:57.867
Keirin Details (pdf)	Joachim Eilers (GER); 9.962	Matthew Glaetzer (AUS) +0.002	Fabián Puerta (COL) +0.088
Omnium Details (pdf)	Lucas Liss (GER); 192 pts	Glenn O'Shea (AUS); 186 pts	Bobby Lea (USA); 179 pts
United Kingdom, London | 5–7 December 2014
Sprint Details (pdf)	Jeffrey Hoogland (NED) +0.110/10.361/10.478	Fabián Puerta (COL); 10.426/+0.202/+0.036	Hersony Canelón (VEN) +7.711/10.647/10.656
Team Sprint Details (pdf)	Germany; Robert Förstemann; Joachim Eilers; René Enders; 43.665	Team Jayco–AIS (AUS); Matthew Glaetzer; Shane Perkins; Nathan Hart; 44.113	New Zealand; Eddie Dawkins; Ethan Mitchell; Sam Webster; 43.713
Team Pursuit Details (pdf)	Great Britain; Steven Burke; Mark Christian; Owain Doull; Andy Tennant; 4:01.151	New Zealand; Pieter Bulling; Westley Gough; Cameron Karwowski; Myron Simpson; 4:05.463	Denmark; Casper Pedersen; Lasse Norman Hansen; Rasmus Quaade; Casper von Folsach; 4:02.248
Keirin Details (pdf)	Stefan Bötticher (GER); 10.569	Fabián Puerta (COL) +0.039	Christos Volikakis (GRE) +0.099
Omnium Details (pdf)	Fernando Gaviria (COL); 197 pts	Scott Law (AUS); 171 pts	Bobby Lea (USA); 164 pts
Points Race Details (pdf)	Eloy Teruel (ESP); 43 pts	Kenny De Ketele (BEL); 34 pts	Eduardo Sepúlveda (ARG); 31 pts
Madison Details (pdf)	Great Britain; Mark Christian; Owain Doull; 4 pts	New Zealand; Pieter Bulling; Westley Gough; 10 pts (1 lap down)	Germany; Henning Bommel; Theo Reinhardt; 9 pts (1 lap down)
Colombia, Cali | 17–18 January 2015
Sprint Details (pdf)	Denis Dmitriev (RUS) (RusVelo); 10.281/+0.037/10.369	Jeffrey Hoogland (NED) +0.064/10.686/+0.178	Fabián Puerta (COL); 10.549/10.264
Team Sprint Details (pdf)	France; Grégory Baugé; Kévin Sireau; Quentin Lafargue; 43.634	Netherlands; Jeffrey Hoogland; Hugo Haak; Matthijs Büchli; 43.816	Poland; Grzegorz Drejgier; Damian Zieliński; Krzysztof Maksel; 43.907
Team Pursuit Details (pdf)	Australia; Scott Law; Joshua Harrison; Jackson Law; Tirian McManus; 4:03.200	RusVelo (RUS); Artur Ershov; Alexander Evtushenko; Alexey Kurbatov; Alexander Serov; 4:04.229	Great Britain; Germain Burton; Matthew Gibson; Christopher Latham; Mark Stewart; 4:05.391
Keirin Details (pdf)	Fabián Puerta (COL); 10.305	Shane Perkins (AUS) (Team Jayco–AIS) +0.002	Matthew Baranoski (USA) +0.096
Omnium Details (pdf)	Maximilian Beyer (GER); 220 pts	Jasper De Buyst (BEL); 206 pts	Gaël Suter (SUI); 178 pts

=== Women ===
Event	Winner	Second	Third
Mexico, Guadalajara | 8–9 November 2014
Sprint Details (pdf)	Anastasiia Voinova (RUS); REL/11.165/11.420	Guo Shuang (CHN) (Max Success Pro Cycling); 11.166/?/+0.057	Lisandra Guerra (CUB) +11.268/11.377
Team Sprint Details (pdf)	Australia; Kaarle McCulloch; Stephanie Morton	Germany; Gudrun Stock; Miriam Welte; DNS	Russia; Daria Shmeleva; Anastasiia Voinova; 32.585
Team Pursuit Details (pdf)	Great Britain; Laura Trott; Elinor Barker; Ciara Horne; Amy Roberts; 4:21.256	Canada; Allison Beveridge; Jasmin Glaesser; Kirsti Lay; Stephanie Roorda; 4:26.122	China; Huang Dongyan; Jing Yali; Wenwen Jiang; Zhao Baofang; 4:23.911
Keirin Details (pdf)	Guo Shuang (CHN) (Max Success Pro Cycling); 11.018	Zhong Tianshi (CHN) (China 361° Cycling Team) +0.068	Anna Meares (AUS) (Team Jayco–AIS) +0.167
Omnium Details (pdf)	Jolien D'Hoore (BEL); 193 pts	Marlies Mejías (CUB); 183 pts	Małgorzata Wojtyra (POL); 166 pts
United Kingdom, London | 5–7 December 2014
Sprint Details (pdf)	Kristina Vogel (GER); 11.441/11.667	Anastasiia Voinova (RUS) +0.053/+0.006	Elis Ligtlee (NED); 11.291/11.238
Team Sprint Details (pdf)	China; Zhong Tianshi; Gong Jinjie; 33.010	Germany; Kristina Vogel; Miriam Welte; 33.024	Russia; Ekaterina Gnidenko; Anastasiia Voinova; 33.429
Team Pursuit Details (pdf)	Great Britain; Katie Archibald; Laura Trott; Elinor Barker; Ciara Horne; 4:22.194	Australia; Isabella King; Ashlee Ankudinoff; Amy Cure; Melissa Hoskins; 4:24.335	Canada; Allison Beveridge; Jasmin Glaesser; Kirsti Lay; Stephanie Roorda; 4:24.188
Keirin Details (pdf)	Guo Shuang (CHN) (Max Success Pro Cycling); 11.276	Kristina Vogel (GER) +0.082	Lee Hye-jin (KOR) +0.093
Omnium Details (pdf)	Laura Trott (GBR); 193 pts	Jolien D'Hoore (BEL); 181 pts	Kirsten Wild (NED); 167 pts
Points Race Details (pdf)	Amy Cure (AUS); 34 pts	Jasmin Glaesser (CAN); 33 pts	Elinor Barker (GBR); 27 pts
Scratch Race Details (pdf)	Milena Salcedo (COL)	Lauren Stephens (USA)	Katarzyna Pawłowska (POL) (1 lap down)
Colombia, Cali | 17–18 January 2015
Sprint Details (pdf)	Elis Ligtlee (NED); 11.397/11.667	Guo Shuang (CHN) (Max Success Pro Cycling) +0.184/+0.042	Lee Wai Sze (HKG); 11.813/11.894
Team Sprint Details (pdf)	Russia; Daria Shmeleva; Ekaterina Gnidenko; 32.982	Netherlands; Elis Ligtlee; Shanne Braspennincx; 33.586	Spain; Tania Calvo; Helena Casas; 33.356
Team Pursuit Details (pdf)	Australia; Macey Stewart; Elissa Wundersitz; Alexandra Manly; Lauren Perry; 4:31.527	China; Huang Dongyan; Jin Di; Liang Hongyu; Zhao Baofang; 4:34.105	United States; Carmen Small; Lauren Tamayo; Jennifer Valente; Ruth Winder; 4:32.482
Keirin Details (pdf)	Lin Junhong (CHN); 11.267	Shanne Braspennincx (NED) +0.035	Melissa Erickson (USA) +0.052
Omnium Details (pdf)	Kirsten Wild (NED); 190 pts	Leire Olaberria (ESP); 169 pts	Anna Knauer (GER); 166 pts
