= 2013 UCI Track Cycling World Championships – Men's team pursuit =

Rainbow jersey

The Men's team pursuit at the 2013 UCI Track Cycling World Championships was held on February 20. 15 nations of 4 cyclists each participated in the contest. After the qualifying, the fastest 2 teams raced for gold, and 3rd and 4th teams raced for bronze.

== Medalists ==
Gold	Australia; Glenn O'Shea; Alex Edmondson; Michael Hepburn; Alexander Morgan
Silver	Great Britain; Steven Burke; Ed Clancy; Sam Harrison; Andrew Tennant
Bronze	Denmark; Lasse Norman Hansen; Casper Folsach; Mathias Møller; Rasmus Christian Quaade

== Results ==
=== Qualifying ===
The qualifying was held at 13:00.

Rank	Name	Nation	Time	Notes
1	Glenn O'Shea; Alex Edmondson; Michael Hepburn; Alexander Morgan	Australia	3:59.325	Q
2	Steven Burke; Ed Clancy; Samuel Harrison; Andrew Tennant	Great Britain	3:59.784	Q
3	Lasse Norman Hansen; Casper Folsach; Mathias Møller; Rasmus Quaade	Denmark	4:00.841	Q
4	Unai Elorriaga Zubiaur; Eloy Teruel Rovira; Asier Maeztu Billelabeitia; Sebastián Mora Vedri	Spain	4:04.587	Q
5	Artur Ershov; Evgeny Kovalev; Ivan Kovalev; Alexander Serov	Russia	4:04.840	
6	Lucas Liss; Henning Bommel; Maximilian Beyer; Theo Reinhardt	Germany	4:05.152	
7	Jasper De Buyst; Kenny De Ketele; Dominique Cornu; Gijs van Hoecke	Belgium	4:05.334	
8	Loïc Perizzolo; Stefan Küng; Silvan Dillier; Tristan Marguet	Switzerland	4:05.827	
9	Liam Bertazzo; Marco Coledan; Ignazio Moser; Michele Scartezzini	Italy	4:07.793	
10	Cao Bo; Shi Tao; Wu Wenguo; Zhao Kang	China	4:09.998	
11	Ondřej Rybín; Roman Furst; František Sisr; Ondrej Vendolsky	Czech Republic	4:11.573	
12	Kwok Ho Ting; Cheung King Lok; Cheung King Wai; Chun Wing Leung	Hong Kong	4:11.585	
13	Artyom Zakharov; Dmitriy Lukyanov; Dias Omirzakov; Ivan Tsissaruk	Kazakhstan	4:13.701	
14	Volodymyr Kogut; Sergiy Lagkuti; Oleksandr Lobov; Vitaliy Shchedov	Ukraine	4:13.852	
15	Aleh Ahiyevich; Aliaksandr Lisouski; Yauheni Shamsonau; Andrei Snitko	Belarus	4:16.278	

=== Finals ===
The finals were held at 21:15.

==== Small Final ====
Rank	Name	Nation	Time	Notes
3rd place, bronze medalist(s)	Lasse Norman Hansen; Casper Folsach; Mathias Møller; Rasmus Quaade	Denmark	3:59.821	
4	Unal Elorriaga Zubiaur; Eloy Teruel Rovira; Asier Maeztu Billelabeitia; Sebastián Mora Vedri	Spain	4:05.569	

==== Final ====
Rank	Name	Nation	Time	Notes
1st place, gold medalist(s)	Glenn O'Shea; Alex Edmondson; Michael Hepburn; Alexander Morgan	Australia	3:56.751	
2nd place, silver medalist(s)	Steven Burke; Ed Clancy; Samuel Harrison; Andrew Tennant	Great Britain	4:00.967	
