= Cycling at the 2016 Summer Olympics – Men's team pursuit =

Men's cycling team pursuit at the Games of the XXXI Olympiad
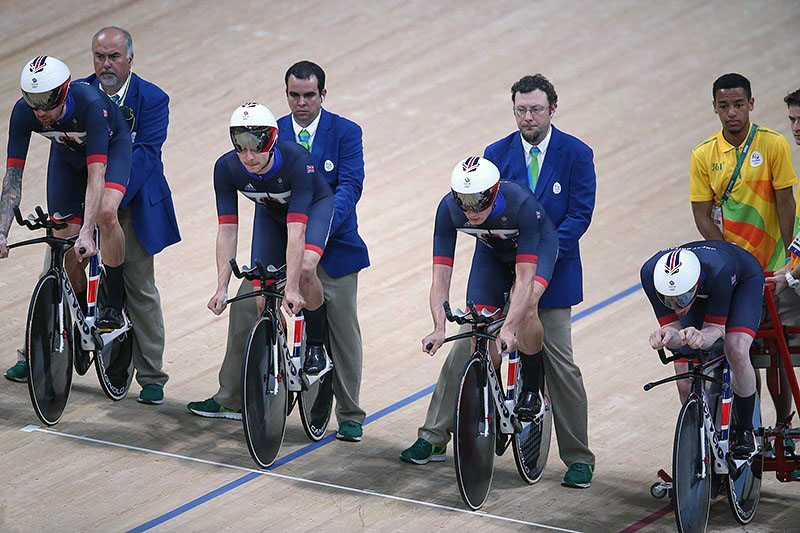
- Great Britain team
- Venue: Rio Olympic Velodrome
- Date: 11–12 August 2016
- Competitors: 40 from 9 nations
- Winning time: 3:50.265 WR, OR

Medalists
1st place, gold medalist(s)		Ed Clancy; Steven Burke; Owain Doull; Bradley Wiggins	Great Britain
2nd place, silver medalist(s)		Alex Edmondson; Jack Bobridge; Michael Hepburn; Sam Welsford; Callum Scotson	Australia
3rd place, bronze medalist(s)		Lasse Norman Hansen; Niklas Larsen; Frederik Madsen; Casper von Folsach; Rasmus Quaade	Denmark

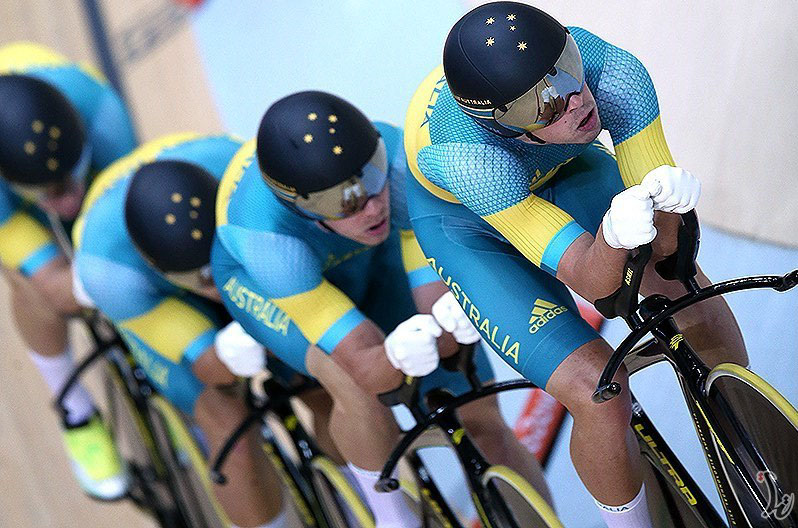
Australia team

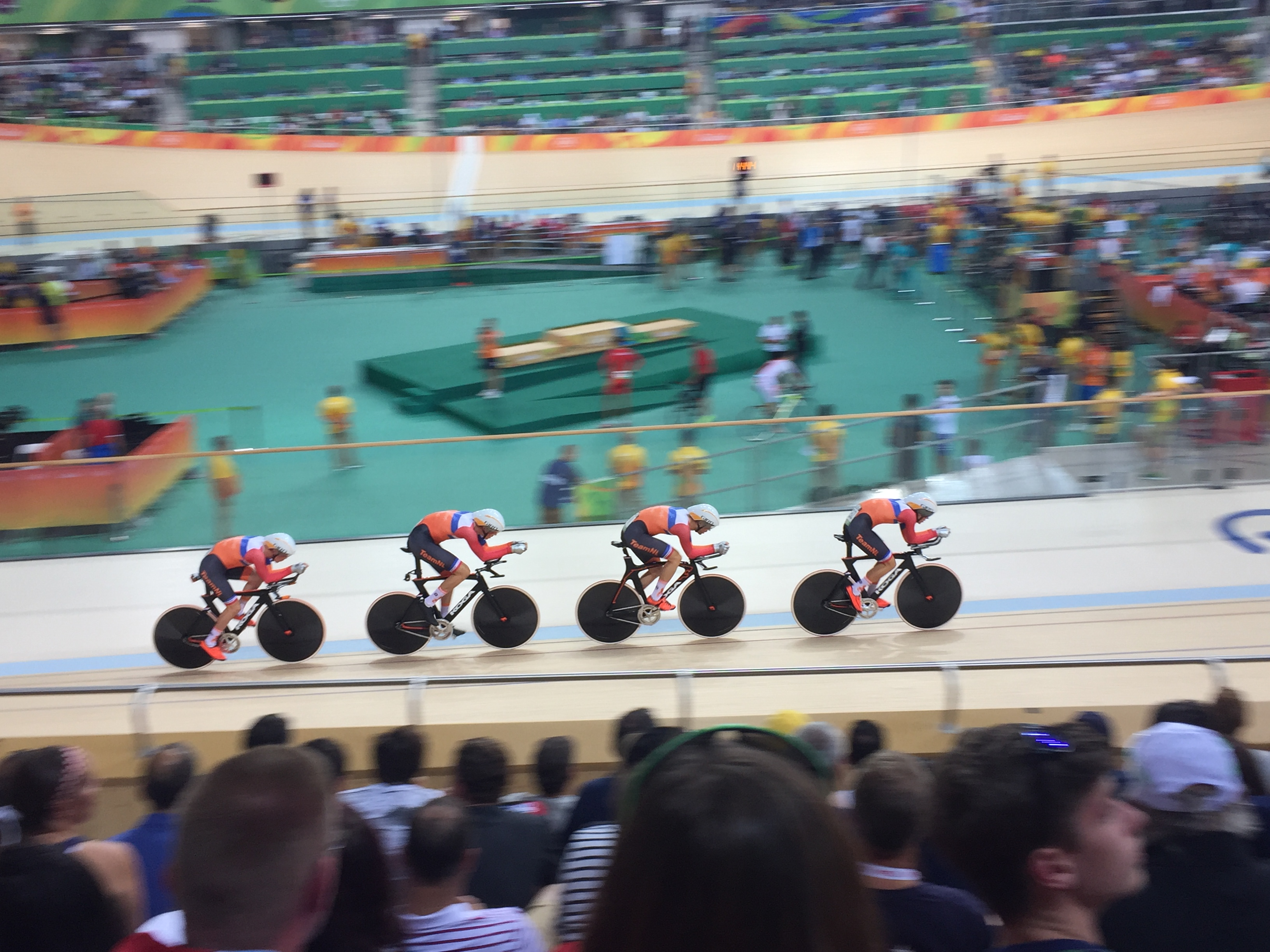
Netherlands team

The men's cycling team pursuit at the 2016 Summer Olympics in Rio de Janeiro took place at the Rio Olympic Velodrome on 11 and 12 August. Team GB established new Olympic and World Records in both their heat and in the final; their gold medal made Sir Bradley Wiggins Britain's most decorated Olympian.

The medals were presented by James Tomkins, IOC member, Australia and Brian Cookson, President of the UCI.

== Schedule ==
All times are Brasília Time

Date	Round
Thursday 11 August 2016	Heats
Friday 12 August 2016	Semifinals
Friday 12 August 2016	Final

== Results ==
=== Qualifications ===
The fastest 8 teams qualify for the first round, from which the top 4 remain in contention for the gold medal final and the other 4 for the bronze medal final.

Rank	Country	Cyclists	Result	Notes
1	Great Britain	Ed Clancy; Steven Burke; Owain Doull; Bradley Wiggins	3:51.943	Q
2	Denmark	Lasse Norman Hansen; Niklas Larsen; Frederik Madsen; Casper von Folsach	3:55.396	Q
3	Australia	Alexander Edmondson; Jack Bobridge; Michael Hepburn; Sam Welsford	3:55.606	Q
4	New Zealand	Pieter Bulling; Aaron Gate; Dylan Kennett; Regan Gough	3:55.977	Q
5	Italy	Simone Consonni; Liam Bertazzo; Filippo Ganna; Francesco Lamon	3:59.708	q
6	Germany	Henning Bommel; Nils Schomber; Kersten Thiele; Domenic Weinstein	4:00.911	q
7	Switzerland	Olivier Beer; Silvan Dillier; Théry Schir; Cyrille Thièry	4:03.845	q
8	China	Fan Yang; Liu Hao; Qin Chenlu; Shen Pingan	4:05.152	q
	Netherlands	Tim Veldt; Wim Stroetinga; Jan-Willem van Schip; Joost van der Burg	DNF	

- Q = qualified; in contention for gold medal final
- q = qualified; in contention for bronze medal final

=== First round ===
First round heats are held as follows:
Heat 1: 6th v 7th qualifier
Heat 2: 5th v 8th qualifier
Heat 3: 2nd v 3rd qualifier
Heat 4: 1st v 4th qualifier

The winners of heats 3 and 4 proceed to the gold medal final. The remaining 6 teams are ranked on time, then proceed to the finals for bronze, 5th or 7th place.

Rank	Heat	Country	Cyclists	Result	Notes
1	4	Great Britain	Ed Clancy; Steven Burke; Owain Doull; Bradley Wiggins	3:50.570	QG, WR, OR
2	3	Australia	Alexander Edmondson; Michael Hepburn; Callum Scotson; Sam Welsford	3:53.429	QG
3	3	Denmark	Lasse Norman Hansen; Niklas Larsen; Frederik Madsen; Rasmus Quaade	3:53.542	QB
4	4	New Zealand	Pieter Bulling; Aaron Gate; Dylan Kennett; Regan Gough	3:55.654	QB
5	2	Italy	Simone Consonni; Liam Bertazzo; Filippo Ganna; Francesco Lamon	3:55.724	Q5
6	1	Germany	Theo Reinhardt; Nils Schomber; Kersten Thiele; Domenic Weinstein	3:56.903	Q5
7	1	Switzerland	Olivier Beer; Silvan Dillier; Théry Schir; Cyrille Thièry	4:03.580	Q7
8	2	China	Fan Yang; Liu Hao; Qin Chenlu; Shen Pingan	4:04.420	Q7

- QG = qualified for gold medal final
- QB = qualified for bronze medal final
- Q5 = qualified for 5th place final
- Q7 = qualified for 7th place final

=== Finals ===
The final classification is determined in the ranking finals.

Rank	Country	Cyclists	Result	Notes
Final for 7th place
7	Switzerland	Olivier Beer; Silvan Dillier; Théry Schir; Cyrille Thièry	4:01.786	
8	China	Fan Yang; Liu Hao; Qin Chenlu; Shen Pingan	4:03.687	
Final for 5th place
5	Germany	Theo Reinhardt; Nils Schomber; Kersten Thiele; Domenic Weinstein	3:59.485	
6	Italy	Simone Consonni; Filippo Ganna; Francesco Lamon; Michele Scartezzini	4:02.360	
Bronze medal final
3rd place, bronze medalist(s)	Denmark	Lasse Norman Hansen; Niklas Larsen; Frederik Madsen; Casper von Folsach	3:53.789	
4	New Zealand	Pieter Bulling; Aaron Gate; Dylan Kennett; Regan Gough	3:56.753	
Gold medal final
1st place, gold medalist(s)	Great Britain	Ed Clancy; Steven Burke; Owain Doull; Bradley Wiggins	3:50.265	WR, OR
2nd place, silver medalist(s)	Australia	Alexander Edmondson; Jack Bobridge; Michael Hepburn; Sam Welsford	3:51.008	
