= 2015 UCI Track Cycling World Championships – Men's team pursuit =

Sports event

Men's team pursuit at the 2015 UCI Track Cycling World Championships
- Venue: Vélodrome de Saint-Quentin-en-Yvelines, Saint-Quentin-en-Yvelines
- Date: 18–19 February 2015
- Competitors: 64 from 16 nations
- Winning time: 3:54.088

Medalists
gold medal	Pieter Bulling; Dylan Kennett; Alex Frame; Marc Ryan	New Zealand
silver medal	Ed Clancy; Steven Burke; Owain Doull; Andrew Tennant	Great Britain
bronze medal	Jack Bobridge; Alexander Edmondson; Mitchell Mulhern; Miles Scotson	Australia

The Men's team pursuit event of the 2015 UCI Track Cycling World Championships was held on 18–19 February 2015.

== Results ==
=== Qualifying ===
The qualifying was held at 16:25.

Rank	Name	Nation	Time	Notes
1	Pieter Bulling; Dylan Kennett; Alex Frame; Marc Ryan	New Zealand	3:56.421	Q
2	Ed Clancy; Steven Burke; Owain Doull; Andrew Tennant	Great Britain	3:57.716	Q
3	Theo Reinhardt; Henning Bommel; Kersten Thiele; Domenic Weinstein	Germany	3:58.823	Q
4	Olivier Beer; Stefan Küng; Frank Pasche; Théry Schir	Switzerland	3:58.887	Q
5	Jack Bobridge; Alexander Edmondson; Mitchell Mulhern; Miles Scotson	Australia	3:58.900	q
6	Tim Veldt; Wim Stroetinga; Dion Beukeboom; Roy Eefting	Netherlands	3:59.520	q
7	Artur Ershov; Alexander Evtushenko; Ivan Kovalev; Alexander Serov	Russia	3:59.817	q
8	Bryan Coquard; Julien Duval; Damien Gaudin; Julien Morice	France	4:00.783	q
9	Jasper De Buyst; Moreno De Pauw; Dominique Cornu; Jonathan Dufrasne	Belgium	4:02.383	
10	Unai Elorriaga; Eloy Teruel; Albert Torres; Illart Zuazubiskar	Spain	4:02.488	
11	Casper van Folsach; Daniel Hartvig; Anders Holm; Rasmus Quaade	Denmark	4:03.520	
12	Fernando Gaviria; Edwin Ávila; Juan Esteban Arango; Weimar Roldán	Colombia	4:03.908	
13	Mauro Agoszini; Maximiliano Richeze; Eduardo Sepúlveda; Sebastian Trillini	Argentina	4:04.714	
14	Raman Tsishkou; Raman Ramanau; Yauheni Akhramenka; Hardzei Tsishchanka	Belarus	4:05.953	
15	Liu Hao; Liu Wei; Qin Chenlu; Shen Pingan	China	4:06.129	
16	Simone Consonni; Elia Viviani; Liam Bertazzo; Marco Coledan	Italy	4:07.165	

=== First round ===
The first round was started at 16:45.

Rank	Name	Nation	Time
1 vs. 4
1	Pieter Bulling; Dylan Kennett; Alex Frame; Marc Ryan	New Zealand	3:56.132
2	Olivier Beer; Stefan Küng; Frank Pasche; Théry Schir	Switzerland	3:57.456
2 vs. 3
1	Ed Clancy; Steven Burke; Owain Doull; Andrew Tennant	Great Britain	3:55.207
2	Theo Reinhardt; Henning Bommel; Kersten Thiele; Domenic Weinstein	Germany	3:57.116
5 vs. 8
1	Jack Bobridge; Alexander Edmondson; Mitchell Mulhern; Miles Scotson	Australia	3:55.314
2	Bryan Coquard; Julien Duval; Damien Gaudin; Julien Morice	France	3:58.616
6 vs. 7
1	Artur Ershov; Alexander Evtushenko; Ivan Kovalev; Alexander Serov	Russia	3:57.181
2	Tim Veldt; Wim Stroetinga; Dion Beukeboom; Roy Eefting	Netherlands	3:58.230

=== Finals ===
The finals were started at 21:45.

Rank	Name	Nation	Time
Gold medal race
1st place, gold medalist(s)	Pieter Bulling; Dylan Kennett; Alex Frame; Regan Gough	New Zealand	3:54.088
2nd place, silver medalist(s)	Ed Clancy; Steven Burke; Owain Doull; Andrew Tennant	Great Britain	3:54.687
Bronze medal race
3rd place, bronze medalist(s)	Jack Bobridge; Alexander Edmondson; Mitchell Mulhern; Miles Scotson	Australia	
4	Theo Reinhardt; Henning Bommel; Kersten Thiele; Domenic Weinstein	Germany	OVL
Fifth place race
5	Artur Ershov; Alexander Evtushenko; Ivan Kovalev; Alexander Serov	Russia	3:56.870
6	Olivier Beer; Stefan Küng; Frank Pasche; Théry Schir	Switzerland	3:58.158
Seventh place race
7	Bryan Coquard; Julien Duval; Damien Gaudin; Julien Morice	France	3:59.938
8	Tim Veldt; Wim Stroetinga; Dion Beukeboom; Roy Eefting	Netherlands	4:01.320
