= 2014 UCI Track Cycling World Championships =

Cycling world championships

- Venue: Cali, Colombia
- Date: 26 February–2 March
- Velodrome: Velódromo Alcides Nieto Patiño
- Nations participating: 31
- Events: 19

The 2014 UCI Track Cycling World Championships was the World Championships for track cycling in 2014. They took place in Cali, Colombia from 26 February to 2 March 2014 in the Velódromo Alcides Nieto Patiño.

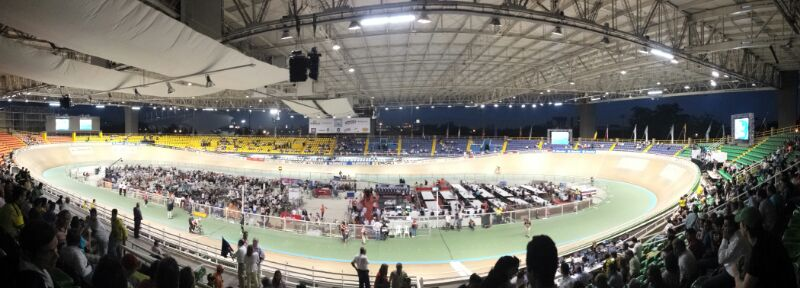
WTCALI2014-1

== Schedule ==
This was the schedule of events:

Date	Time	Round
26 February 2014	12:00	Men's team pursuit qualifying
26 February 2014	18:15	Women's team sprint qualifying
26 February 2014	18:15	Men's team sprint qualifying
26 February 2014	18:15	Women's scratch final
26 February 2014	18:15	Men's team pursuit final
26 February 2014	18:15	Women's team sprint final
26 February 2014	18:15	Men's team sprint final
27 February 2014	12:00	Men's individual pursuit qualifying
27 February 2014	12:00	Men's keirin 1st round, Repechage
27 February 2014	12:00	Women's team pursuit qualifying
27 February 2014	18:15	Women's 500m time trial
27 February 2014	18:15	Men's scratch final
27 February 2014	18:15	Men's keirin 2nd round
27 February 2014	18:15	Men's individual pursuit final
27 February 2014	18:15	Men's keirin finals
27 February 2014	18:15	Women's team pursuit final
28 February 2014	12:00	Women's sprint qualifying
28 February 2014	12:00	Men's omnium, Flying lap
28 February 2014	12:00	Women's sprint 1/16, 1/8 Final, Repechage
28 February 2014	12:00	Women's individual pursuit qualifying
28 February 2014	12:00	Men's omnium, Points race
28 February 2014	18:30	Men's 1 km time trial
28 February 2014	18:30	Women's sprint quarterfinals, Race 5–8
28 February 2014	18:30	Women's individual pursuit final
28 February 2014	18:30	Men's points race
28 February 2014	18:30	Men's omnium, Elimination

Date	Time	Round
1 March 2014	12:00	Men's sprint qualifying
1 March 2014	12:00	Women's omnium, Flying lap
1 March 2014	12:00	Men's sprint 1/16, 1/8 Final, Repechages
1 March 2014	12:00	Men's omnium, Individual pursuit
1 March 2014	12:00	Women's omnium, Points race
1 March 2014	18:30	Women's sprint semifinals
1 March 2014	18:30	Men's sprint quarterfinals, Race 5–8
1 March 2014	18:30	Men's omnium, Scratch
1 March 2014	18:30	Women's points race
1 March 2014	18:30	Women's sprint finals
1 March 2014	18:30	Men's omnium, 1 km time trial
1 March 2014	18:30	Women's omnium, Elimination
2 March 2014	12:00	Women's keirin 1st round, Repechage
2 March 2014	12:00	Women's omnium, Individual pursuit
2 March 2014	15:30	Men's sprint semifinals
2 March 2014	15:30	Women's omnium, Scratch
2 March 2014	15:30	Women's keirin 2nd round
2 March 2014	15:30	Women's omnium, 500m time trial
2 March 2014	15:30	Women's keirin finals
2 March 2014	15:30	Men's sprint finals
2 March 2014	15:30	Men's madison

== Medal summary ==
Event	Gold	Silver	Bronze
Men's events
Men's sprint	François Pervis; France	Stefan Bötticher; Germany	Denis Dmitriev; Russia
Men's 1 km time trial	François Pervis; France	Joachim Eilers; Germany	Simon van Velthooven; New Zealand
Men's individual pursuit	Alex Edmondson; Australia	Stefan Küng; Switzerland	Marc Ryan; New Zealand
Men's team pursuit	Australia; Glenn O'Shea; Alex Edmondson; Luke Davison; Mitchell Mulhern; Miles Scotson (qualifying round only)	Denmark; Lasse Norman Hansen; Casper von Folsach; Alex Rasmussen; Rasmus Quaade	New Zealand; Aaron Gate; Pieter Bulling; Dylan Kennett; Marc Ryan
Men's team sprint	New Zealand; Ethan Mitchell; Sam Webster; Eddie Dawkins	Germany; René Enders; Robert Förstemann; Maximilian Levy	France; Grégory Baugé; Kévin Sireau; Michaël D'Almeida
Men's keirin	François Pervis; France	Fabián Puerta; Colombia	Matthijs Büchli; Netherlands
Men's scratch	Ivan Kovalev; Russia	Martyn Irvine; Ireland	Cheung King Lok; Hong Kong
Men's points race	Edwin Ávila; Colombia	Thomas Scully; New Zealand	Eloy Teruel; Spain
Men's madison	Spain; David Muntaner; Albert Torres	Czech Republic; Martin Bláha; Vojtěch Hačecký	Switzerland; Stefan Küng; Théry Schir
Men's omnium	Thomas Boudat; France	Tim Veldt; Netherlands	Viktor Manakov; Russia
Women's events
Women's sprint	Kristina Vogel; Germany	Zhong Tianshi; China	Lin Junhong; China
Women's 500 m time trial	Miriam Welte; Germany	Anna Meares; Australia	Anastasiia Voinova; Russia
Women's individual pursuit	Joanna Rowsell; Great Britain	Sarah Hammer; United States	Amy Cure; Australia
Women's team pursuit	Great Britain; Laura Trott; Katie Archibald; Elinor Barker; Joanna Rowsell	Canada; Laura Brown; Jasmin Glaesser; Allison Beveridge; Stephanie Roorda	Australia; Annette Edmondson; Amy Cure; Melissa Hoskins; Isabella King
Women's team sprint	Germany; Kristina Vogel; Miriam Welte	China; Lin Junhong; Zhong Tianshi	Great Britain; Becky James; Jessica Varnish
Women's keirin	Kristina Vogel; Germany	Anna Meares; Australia	Becky James; Great Britain
Women's scratch	Kelly Druyts; Belgium	Katarzyna Pawłowska; Poland	Evgenia Romanyuta; Russia
Women's points race	Amy Cure; Australia	Stephanie Pohl; Germany	Jasmin Glaesser; Canada
Women's omnium	Sarah Hammer; United States	Laura Trott; Great Britain	Annette Edmondson; Australia

- Shaded events are non-Olympic

== Medal table ==
Rank	Nation	Gold	Silver	Bronze	Total
1	Germany	4	4	0	8
2	France	4	0	1	5
3	Australia	3	2	3	8
4	Great Britain	2	1	2	5
5	New Zealand	1	1	3	5
6	Colombia	1	1	0	2
6	United States	1	1	0	2
8	Russia	1	0	4	5
9	Spain	1	0	1	2
10	Belgium	1	0	0	1
11	China	0	2	1	3
12	Canada	0	1	1	2
12	Netherlands	0	1	1	2
12	Switzerland	0	1	1	2
15	Czech Republic	0	1	0	1
15	Denmark	0	1	0	1
15	Ireland	0	1	0	1
15	Poland	0	1	0	1
19	Hong Kong	0	0	1	1
Totals (19 entries)		19	19	19	57
