= Miles Scotson =

Australian racing cyclist

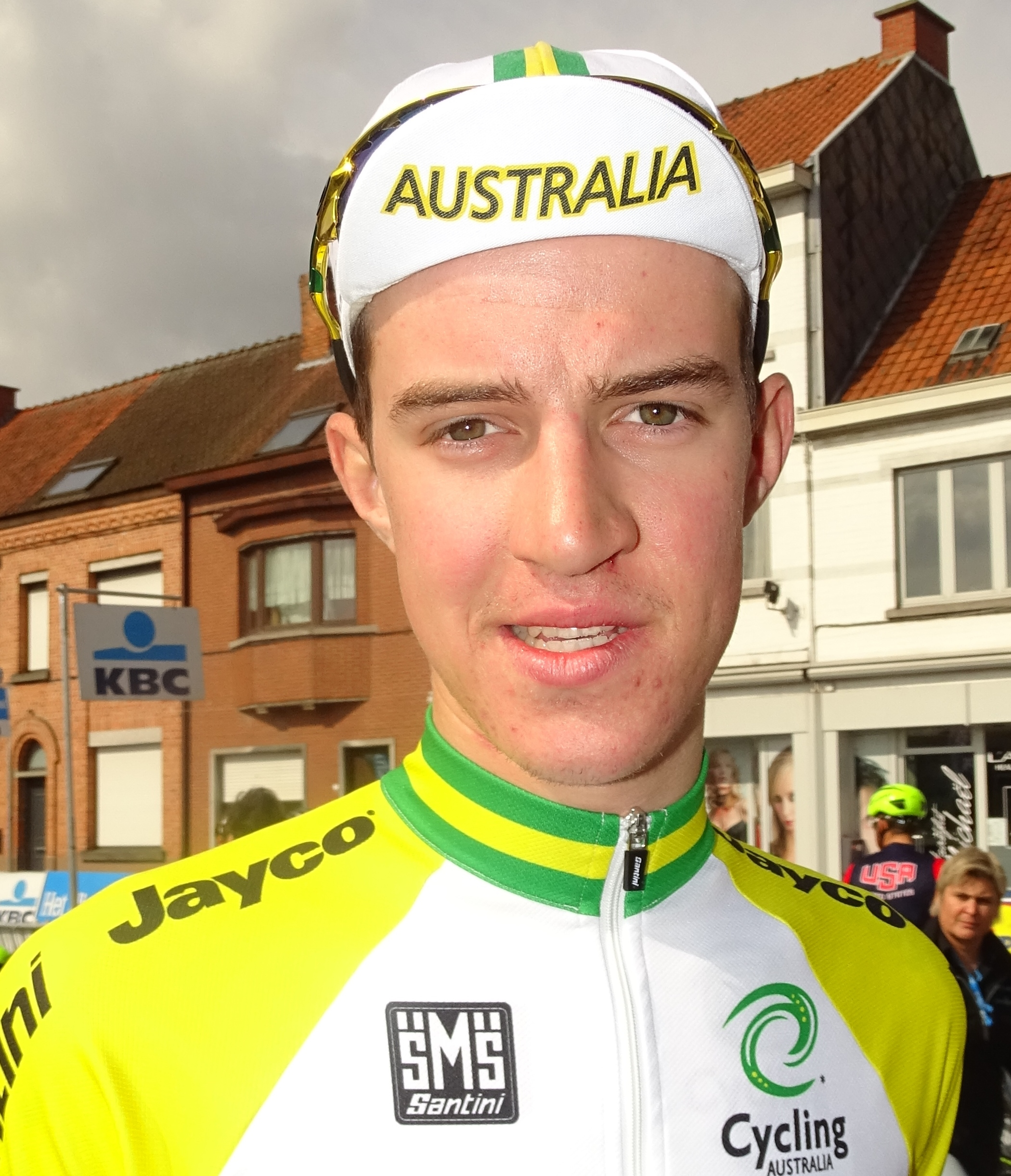
- Scotson in 2015

Personal information
- Nickname: Milo
- Born: 18 January 1994 (age 32) Campbelltown, South Australia, Australia
- Height: 189 cm (6 ft 2 in)
- Weight: 74 kg (163 lb)

Cycling career
- Sport: Cycling
- Current team: Arkéa–B&B Hotels
- Disciplines: Road; Track
- Role: Rider
- Rider type: Time trialist (road); Endurance (track)

Professional teams
- 2016: Team Illuminate
- 2016: Wanty–Groupe Gobert (stagiaire)
- 2017–2018: BMC Racing Team
- 2019–2023: Groupama–FDJ
- 2024–: Arkéa–B&B Hotels

Major wins
- Road One-day races and Classics National Road Race Championships (2017) Track Team pursuit, World Championships (2014, 2016)
Medal record
Men's track cycling
Representing Australia
World Championships
Gold medal – first place	2016 London	Team pursuit
Gold medal – first place	2014 Cali	Team pursuit
Bronze medal – third place	2015 Yvelines	Team pursuit
Men's road bicycle racing
Representing Australia
World Championships
Bronze medal – third place	2016 Doha	Men's under-23 time trial

Miles Scotson (born 18 January 1994) is an Australian track and road cycling racer, who currently rides for UCI WorldTeam Arkéa–B&B Hotels. Scotson was a student at Trinity College Gawler, completing his studies in 2011. Scotson's first professional victory was the 2017 Australian National Road Race Championships. In May 2019, he was named in the startlist for the 2019 Giro d'Italia.

Scotson's younger brother Callum Scotson is also a successful professional cyclist and former Trinity student, who currently rides for UCI WorldTeam Team Jayco–AlUla.

== Major results ==
=== Road ===
2012
3rd Time trial, National Junior Championships
2013
4th Time trial, Oceania Under-23 Championships
2014
3rd Time trial, National Under-23 Championships
2015
National Under-23 Championships

1st Road race
1st Time trial

4th Chrono Champenois
7th Time trial, UCI World Under-23 Championships
8th Gran Premio di Poggiana
2016
1st Stage 3a (ITT) Olympia's Tour
National Under-23 Championships

2nd Time trial
3rd Road race

3rd Time trial, UCI World Under-23 Championships
4th Chrono Champenois
5th Duo Normand (with Callum Scotson)
2017
National Championships

1st Road race
5th Time trial

2nd Team time trial, UCI World Championships
2019
4th Overall Tour Poitou-Charentes en Nouvelle-Aquitaine

1st Young rider classification

2021
4th Classic Loire Atlantique
9th Overall Volta a la Comunitat Valenciana

1st Stage 1

=== Grand Tour general classification results timeline ===
Grand Tour	2019	2020	2021	2022
Giro d'Italia	138	113	—	127
Tour de France	—	—	DNF	—
Vuelta a España	—	—	—	109

=== Track ===
2012
1st Team pursuit, UCI World Junior Championships
2014
1st Team pursuit, UCI World Championships
1st Team pursuit, UCI World Cup, Guadalajara
2015
3rd Team pursuit, UCI World Championships
2016
1st Team pursuit, UCI World Championships
