= 2017 UCI Track Cycling World Championships – Men's individual pursuit =

Men's individual pursuit at the 2017 UCI Track Cycling World Championships
- Venue: Hong Kong Velodrome
- Location: Hong Kong
- Dates: 14 April
- Competitors: 26 from 16 nations
- Winning time: 4:17.068

Medalists
gold medal	Jordan Kerby	Australia
silver medal	Filippo Ganna	Italy
bronze medal	Kelland O'Brien	Australia

The Men's individual pursuit competition at the 2017 World Championships was held on 14 April 2017.

== Results ==
=== Qualifying ===
The first two racers will race for gold, the third and fourth fastest rider will race for the bronze medal.

Rank	Name	Nation	Time	Behind	Notes
1	Jordan Kerby	Australia	4:12.172		Q, CR
2	Filippo Ganna	Italy	4:14.647	+2.475	Q
3	Kelland O'Brien	Australia	4:15.794	+3.622	q
4	Corentin Ermenault	France	4:17.543	+5.371	q
5	Alexander Evtushenko	Russia	4:19.185	+7.013	
6	Ivo Oliveira	Portugal	4:19.250	+7.078	
7	Daniel Staniszewski	Poland	4:19.411	+7.239	
8	Dion Beukeboom	Netherlands	4:19.621	+7.449	
9	Kersten Thiele	Germany	4:20.052	+7.880	
10	Mikhail Shemeteau	Belarus	4:20.363	+8.191	
11	Nicholas Kergozou	New Zealand	4:21.333	+9.161	
12	Szymon Sajnok	Poland	4:21.914	+9.742	
13	Matthew Bostock	Great Britain	4:22.122	+9.950	
14	Andrew Tennant	Great Britain	4:22.664	+10.492	
15	Dylan Kennett	New Zealand	4:23.136	+10.964	
16	Jan-Willem van Schip	Netherlands	4:23.843	+11.671	
17	Liam Bertazzo	Italy	4:24.561	+12.389	
18	Thomas Denis	France	4:24.577	+12.405	
19	Jay Lamoureux	Canada	4:25.042	+12.870	
20	Louis Pijourlet	France	4:26.047	+13.875	
21	Jasper Frahm	Germany	4:26.078	+13.906	
22	Vicente García de Mateos	Spain	4:28.997	+16.825	
23	Artyom Zakharov	Kazakhstan	4:29.154	+16.982	
24	Carloalberto Giordani	Italy	4:32.045	+19.873	
25	Shunsuke Imamura	Japan	4:35.093	+22.921	
26	Ko Siu Wai	Hong Kong	4:35.233	+23.061	

=== Finals ===
The finals were started at 20:41.

Rank	Name	Nation	Time	Behind
Gold Medal Race
1st place, gold medalist(s)	Jordan Kerby	Australia	4:17.068	
2nd place, silver medalist(s)	Filippo Ganna	Italy	4:21.299	+4.131
Bronze Medal Race
3rd place, bronze medalist(s)	Kelland O'Brien	Australia	4:16.909	
4	Corentin Ermenault	France	4:19.436	+2.527
