= Callum Scotson =

Australian cyclist (born 1996)

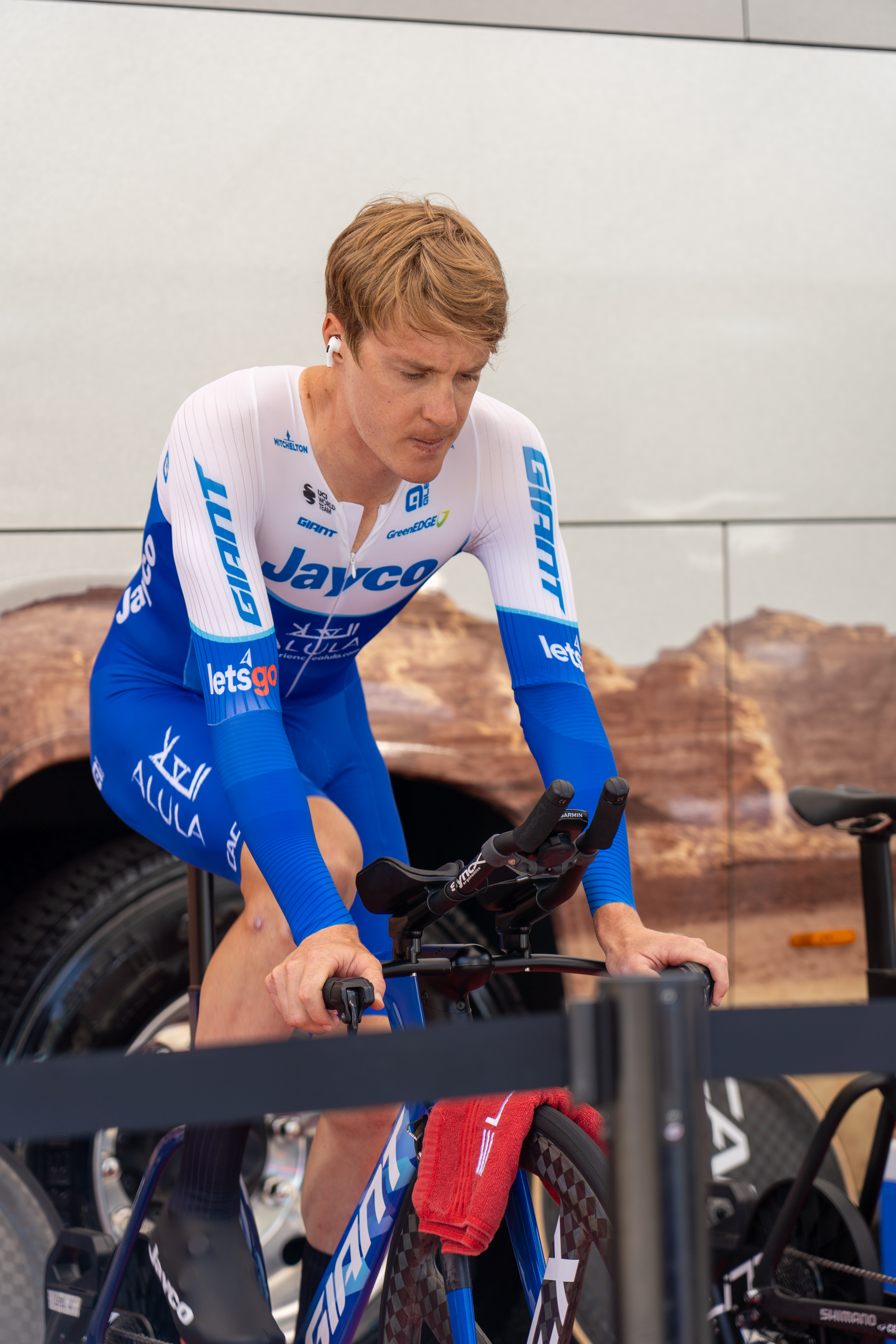
- Scotson at the 2023 Vuelta a España.

Personal information
- Born: 10 August 1996 (age 30) Gawler, South Australia
- Height: 1.84 m (6 ft 0 in)
- Weight: 77 kg (170 lb)

Cycling career
- Sport: Cycling
- Current team: Decathlon CMA CGM Team
- Disciplines: Road; Track
- Role: Rider

Amateur team
- 2017: BMC Development Team

Professional teams
- 2016: Team Illuminate
- 2018: Mitchelton–BikeExchange
- 2019–2024: Mitchelton–Scott
- 2025–: Decathlon–AG2R La Mondiale

Major wins
- Track Team pursuit, World Championships (2016)
Medal record
Olympic Games
Silver medal – second place	2016 Rio de Janeiro	Team pursuit
World Championships
Gold medal – first place	2016 London	Team pursuit
Silver medal – second place	2017 Hong Kong	Madison
Bronze medal – third place	2018 Apeldoorn	Scratch
Bronze medal – third place	2018 Apeldoorn	Madison

Callum Scotson (born 10 August 1996) is an Australian professional racing cyclist, who currently rides for UCI WorldTeam Decathlon CMA CGM Team. He rode in the men's team pursuit at the 2016 UCI Track Cycling World Championships winning a gold medal.

Scotson's older brother Miles Scotson is also a successful professional cyclist and they are both former students of Trinity College Gawler. In August 2020, Scotson was studying a Bachelor of Commerce/Arts at Deakin University. In October 2020, he was named in the startlist for the 2020 Vuelta a España.

== Major results ==
=== Road ===
2014
1st Time trial, National Junior Championships
2016
1st Time trial, National Under-23 Championships
5th Duo Normand (with Miles Scotson)
10th Time trial, UCI World Under-23 Championships
2017
1st Time trial, National Under-23 Championships
5th Time trial, UCI World Under-23 Championships
5th Overall Le Triptyque des Monts et Chateaux
2018
1st Time trial, National Under-23 Championships
4th Time trial, Commonwealth Games
5th Paris–Roubaix Espoirs
10th Time trial, UCI World Under-23 Championships
2024
7th Overall Tour de Hongrie
8th Overall Okolo Slovenska

1st Stage 1 (TTT)

==== Grand Tour general classification results timeline ====
Grand Tour	2020	2021	2022	2023	2024
Giro d'Italia	—	83	80	DNF	—
Tour de France	—	—	—	—	—
Vuelta a España	88	—	—	DNF	DNF

Legend
—	Did not compete
DNF	Did not finish

=== Track ===
2013
UCI World Junior Championships

1st Team pursuit
2nd Individual pursuit

2014
1st Team pursuit, UCI World Junior Championships
1st Team pursuit, UCI World Cup, Guadalajara
2016
1st Team pursuit, UCI World Championships
1st Team pursuit, National Championships
2nd Team pursuit, Olympic Games
2nd Madison, UCI World Cup, Glasgow (with Cameron Meyer)
3rd Six Days of London (with Cameron Meyer)
2017
1st Madison, UCI World Cup (with Cameron Meyer), Pruszków
1st Six Days of London (with Cameron Meyer)
2nd Madison, UCI World Championships (with Cameron Meyer)
