= Argentina at the UCI Track Cycling World Championships =

- IOC code: ARG
- Medals Ranked -th: Gold 0 Silver 0 Bronze 0 Total 0

This page details Argentina's participation at the UCI Track Cycling World Championships, the highest level of competition with professional track cycling. Winners of the World Championships are entitled to wear the rainbow jersey within their respective discipline for the following period of one year. Past World Champions are typically signified by with rainbow edging or piping on their jersey and shorts.

== Results ==
=== Men ===
Name	Competition	Event	Result	Rank
Mauro Agoszini; Maximiliano Richeze; Eduardo Sepúlveda; Sebastian Trillini	2015	Men's team pursuit	4:04.714	13
