= Kelland O'Brien =

Australian cyclist (born 1998)

Kelland O'Brien OAM
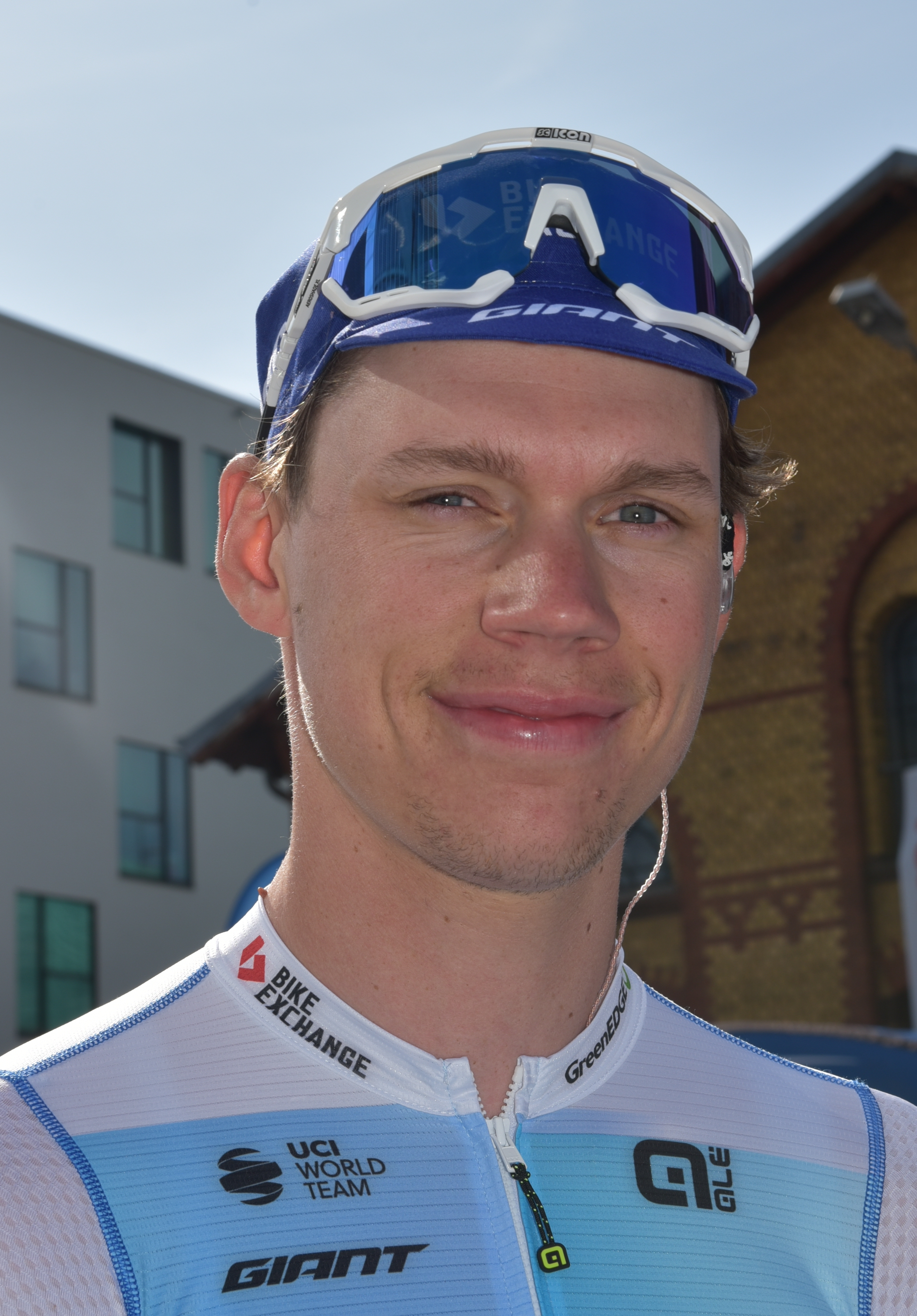
- O'Brien in 2022

Personal information
- Full name: Kelland O'Brien
- Born: 22 May 1998 (age 28) Melbourne, Australia
- Height: 1.92 m (6 ft 4 in)
- Weight: 79 kg (174 lb)

Cycling career
- Sport: Cycling
- Current team: Team BikeExchange–Jayco
- Disciplines: Road; Track
- Role: Rider

Amateur teams
- 2017: Jayco–John West–VIS
- 2020: St Kilda Cycling Club

Professional teams
- 2018–2019: ACA–Ride Sunshine Coast
- 2022–: Team BikeExchange–Jayco

Major wins
- Track Olympic Games Team pursuit (2024)
Medal record
Men's track cycling
Representing Australia
Olympic Games
Gold medal – first place	2024 Paris	Team pursuit
Bronze medal – third place	2020 Tokyo	Team pursuit
World Championships
Gold medal – first place	2017 Hong Kong	Team pursuit
Gold medal – first place	2019 Pruszków	Team pursuit
Bronze medal – third place	2017 Hong Kong	Individual pursuit
Commonwealth Games
Gold medal – first place	2018 Gold Coast	Team pursuit

Kelland O'Brien OAM (born 22 May 1998) is an Australian racing cyclist, who currently rides for UCI WorldTeam Team Jayco–AlUla. O'Brien qualified for the 2024 Paris Olympics and was part of the Men's team pursuit where he and his team secured an Olympic Gold Medal. The team also set a new Olympic & World record in their First Round Qualifying race with a time of 3:40.730 on 6 August 2024.

== Biography ==
O'Brien grew up in Kew, Victoria, Australia. He started in BMX but then switched to mountain bike. O'Brien also did quite a bit of road cycling before concentrating on the track. He represented Australia at the 2015 Junior World Championships and his performances allowed him to get a Madison gold and Team Pursuit bronze.

O'Brien rode in the men's team pursuit event at the 2017 UCI Track Cycling World Championships. In December 2017, he was awarded Australian Institute of Sport Emerging Athlete of the Year.

== Major results ==
=== Road ===
2019
4th Time trial, National Under-23 Championships
10th Halle–Ingooigem
2020
2nd Time trial, National Under-23 Championships
2021
National Championships

2nd Road Race
3rd Time trial

2022
7th Dwars door Vlaanderen
2023
1st Criterium, National Championships
9th Rund um Köln
2024
National Championships

3rd Road race
4th Time trial

8th Overall Boucles de la Mayenne
2025
3rd Time trial, National Championships
2026

3rd Time trial, National Championships

=== Grand Tour general classification results timeline ===
Grand Tour	2022
Giro d'Italia	—
Tour de France	—
Vuelta a España	DNF

Legend
—	Did not compete
DNF	Did not finish

=== Track ===
2015
UCI World Junior Championships

1st Madison (with Rohan Wight)
3rd Individual pursuit

1st Omnium, National Junior Championships
2016
3rd Madison, UCI World Junior Championships (with Cameron Scott)
2017
UCI World Championships

1st Team pursuit
3rd Individual pursuit

2018
1st Team pursuit, Commonwealth Games
Oceania Championships

1st Team pursuit
3rd Points race

National Championships

1st Points race
1st Team pursuit
3rd Individual pursuit

UCI World Cup

1st Team pursuit, Burlin
3rd Madison, Saint-Quentin-en-Yvelines (with Leigh Howard)

2nd Six Days of London (with Leigh Howard)
2019
Oceania Championships

1st Points race
2nd Omnium

National Championships

1st Madison (with Leigh Howard)
1st Scratch
1st Team pursuit
2nd Points race

UCI World Cup

1st Team pursuit, Brisbane
2nd Madison, Hong Kong (with Sam Welsford)

2020
Oceania Championships

1st Madison (with Sam Welsford)
2nd Scratch

1st Madison, National Championships (with Sam Welsford)
2021
2nd Madison, National Championships (with Cameron Meyer)
3rd Team pursuit, Olympic Games
2023
1st Madison, National Championships (with Graeme Frislie)
2024
1st Team pursuit, Olympic Games
