= Alex Edmondson =

Australian cyclist (born 1993)

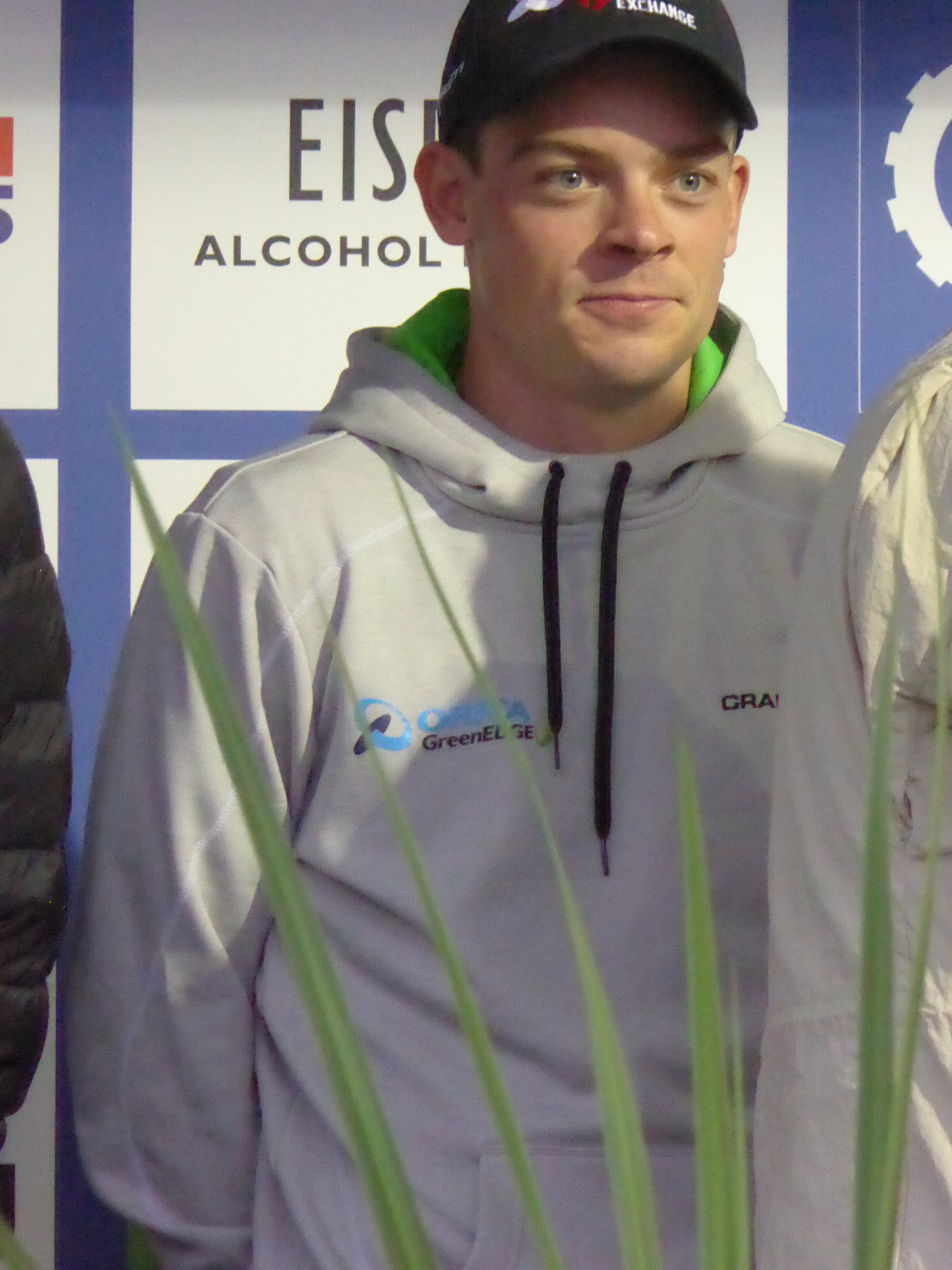
- Edmondson at the 2016 Tour of Britain.

Personal information
- Full name: Alexander Edmondson
- Nickname: Edmo
- Born: 22 December 1993 (age 32) Miri, Malaysia
- Height: 184 cm (6 ft 0 in)
- Weight: 75 kg (165 lb)

Cycling career
- Sport: Cycling
- Current team: Team Picnic–PostNL
- Disciplines: Road; Track
- Role: Rider
- Rider type: Puncheur (road); Pursuitist (track)

Professional teams
- 2016–2022: Orica–GreenEDGE
- 2023–: Team DSM

Major wins
- Road One-day races and Classics National Road Race Championships (2018) Track Individual pursuit, World Championships (2014) Team pursuit, World Championships (2013, 2014)
Medal record
Men's track cycling
Representing Australia
Olympic Games
Silver medal – second place	2016 Rio de Janeiro	Team pursuit
UCI Track Cycling World Championships
Gold medal – first place	2013 Minsk	Team pursuit
Gold medal – first place	2014 Cali	Individual pursuit
Gold medal – first place	2014 Cali	Team pursuit
Bronze medal – third place	2015 Yvelines	Team pursuit
Commonwealth Games
Gold medal – first place	2014 Glasgow	Team pursuit
Silver medal – second place	2014 Glasgow	Individual pursuit
Men's road bicycle racing
Representing Orica–BikeExchange
World Championships
Bronze medal – third place	2016 Doha	Team time trial

Alexander Edmondson (born 22 December 1993) is an Australian road and track cyclist, who currently rides for UCI WorldTeam Team Picnic–PostNL. Edmondson was a member of the Australian Olympic Track Cycling team at the 2012 London Olympics, alongside his sister, Annette Edmondson. In 2014 he was world champion in the individual pursuit. He won the silver medal in the team pursuit at the 2016 Summer Olympics in Rio de Janeiro.

== Early life and amateur career ==
Edmondson was born above a Chinese coffee shop in Borneo. He lived in both the Netherlands and the Sultanate of Oman before returning to Australia at the end of 1998. Edmondson and his sister both attended St. John's Grammar School, in the Adelaide Hills. At the age of 18, Edmondson became the 2nd youngest cyclist ever to be selected for an Australian Olympic Team. With his sister Annette they became the first brother and sister combination to be selected to represent Australia at the same Olympics. For recognition of his achievements Edmondson was awarded a scholarship with the Sport Australia Hall of Fame. In 2013, he won the South Australian Sports Star of the Year award. Previous winners have included Lleyton Hewitt, Donald Bradman and Malcolm Blight. In March 2014, Edmondson competed in the 2014 UCI Track Cycling World Championships in Cali, Colombia winning two World Titles in the individual pursuit and team pursuit. A few months later Edmondson won the gold medal in the team pursuit at the 2014 Commonwealth Games at Glasgow. He is also a dual Junior World Champion where his records still stand today.

== Professional career ==
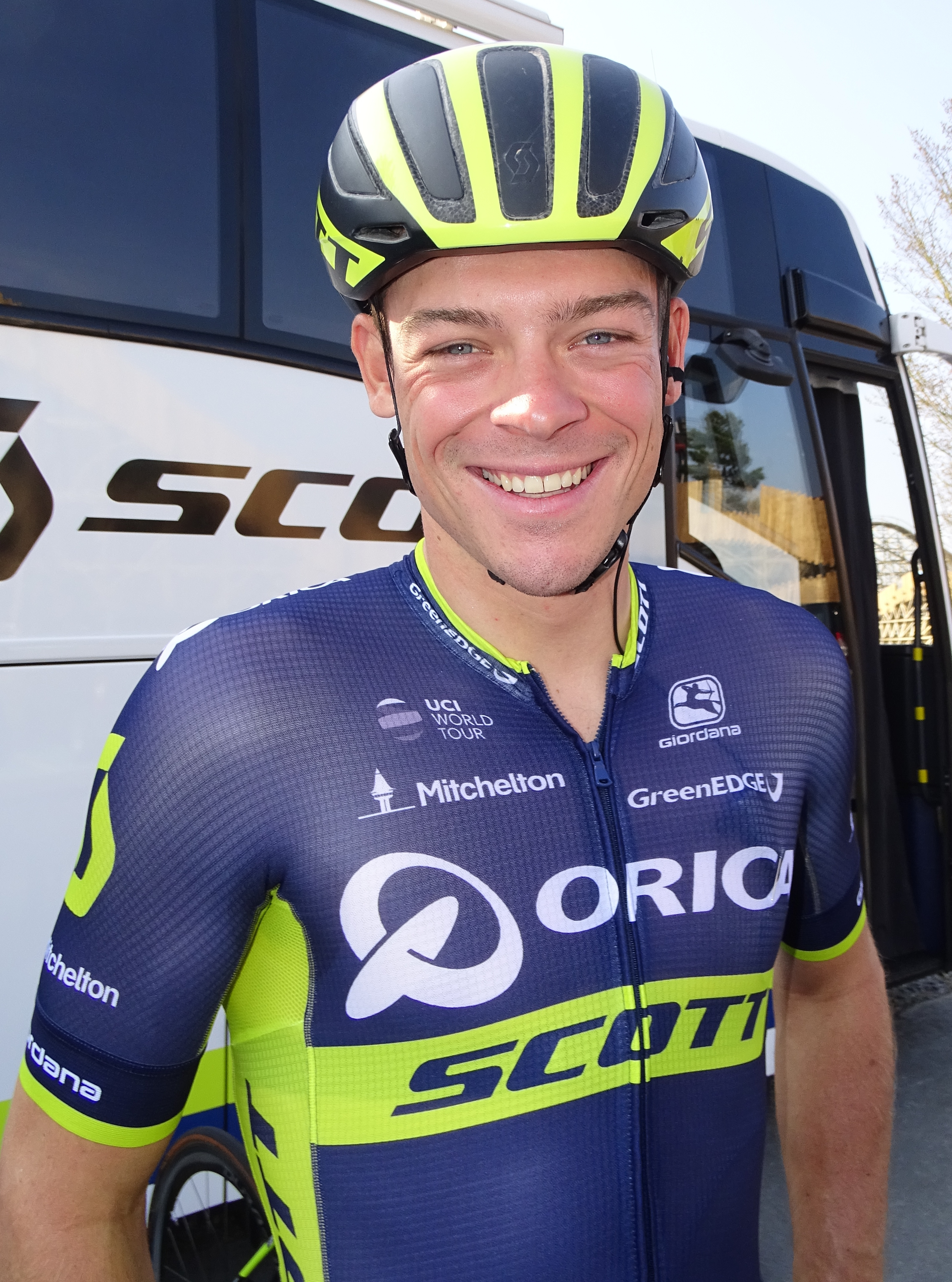
Edmondson in 2017.

In January 2015, it was reported in the Adelaide Advertiser that Edmondson had signed his first UCI World Tour contract with Australian road cycling team Orica–GreenEDGE for the 2016 and 2017 seasons.

I know I have achieved a fair bit at a young age, but I want to be remembered as a true sportsman, someone who always gave their all and never forgot those who have helped me achieve my results. I also want to be remembered for making time for younger athletes and being supportive of them. I know from personal experience how much impact having a mentor can have on a young athlete starting out

— Alexander Edmondson

Edmondson believes it's critical that he is a champion both on and off the bike, and has become increasingly involved in community events since he returned from the Olympics. Edmondson volunteers his time at local high schools mentoring and speaking with students encouraging them to get the best out of themselves. He talks about goal setting, pain is a short term hindrance and how important challenging yourself is. He has been a guest speaker at a number of events, including the Australian Cycling Executives (ACE), Cancer Council Breakfast, AOC Talk with a Champ program and also an event called the Faces of the World Dinner for 400 people promoting multiculturalism and strength in diversity within South Australia.

He was named in the start list for the 2017 Giro d'Italia.

== Major results ==
=== Road ===
2014
1st Stage 6 Tour of Gippsland
2015
1st Ronde Van Vlaanderen Beloften
2nd Road race, National Under-23 Championships
9th Overall Paris–Arras Tour
2016
2nd Dwars door de Vlaamse Ardennen
3rd Team time trial, UCI World Championships
3rd Overall Paris–Arras Tour
2018 (1 pro win)
1st Road race, National Championships
2019
1st Points classification, CRO Race
1st Stage 1 (TTT) Tirreno–Adriatico
2023
4th Overall ZLM Tour
2024
1st Stage 1 (TTT) Danmark Rundt

==== Grand Tour general classification results timeline ====
Grand Tour	2017	2018	2019	2020	2021	2022	2023
Giro d'Italia	DNF	—	—	—	—	—	—
Tour de France	—	—	—	—	—	—	146
Vuelta a España	—	155	—	135	—	—	

Legend
—	Did not compete
DNF	Did not finish

=== Track ===
2011
UCI World Junior Championships

1st Team pursuit
1st Madison

National Championships

1st Team pursuit
2nd Madison
3rd Omnium

UCI World Cup, Astana

1st Madison
2nd Team pursuit

3rd Madison, Oceania Championships
2012
1st Madison, Oceania Championships
1st Team pursuit, National Championships
UCI World Cup

1st Team pursuit, London
2nd Team pursuit, Beijing

2013
1st Team pursuit, UCI World Championships
National Championships

1st Points race
1st Team pursuit
3rd Individual pursuit

2014
UCI World Championships

1st Individual pursuit
1st Team pursuit

Commonwealth Games

1st Team pursuit
2nd Individual pursuit

National Championships

1st Omnium
1st Madison
1st Individual pursuit
1st Team pursuit

2015
1st Team pursuit, National Championships
3rd Team pursuit, UCI World Championships
2016
National Championships

1st Points race
1st Scratch
1st Team pursuit

2nd Team pursuit, Olympic Games
