= Alex Frame =

New Zealand cyclist (born 1993)

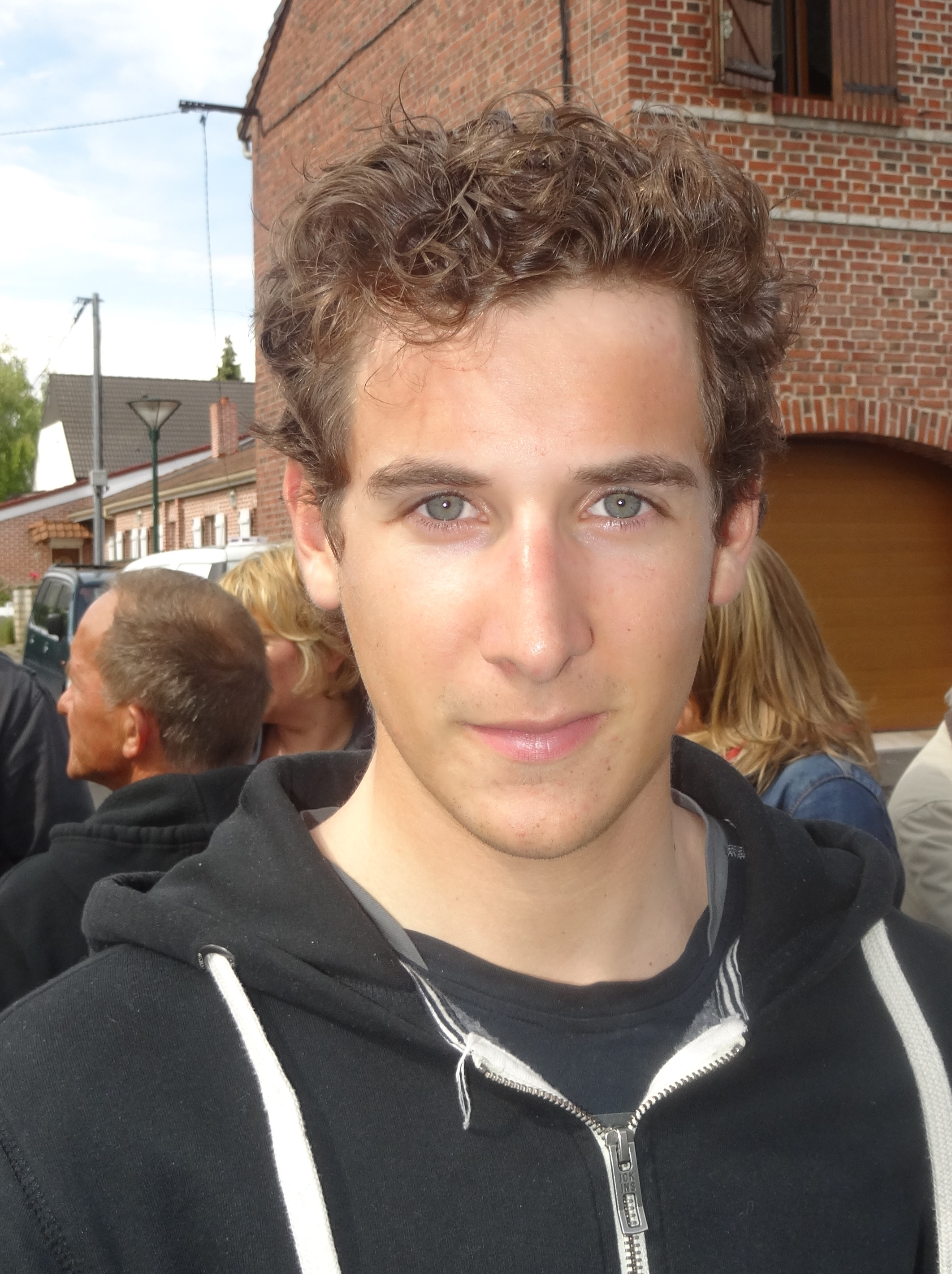
- Frame in 2014

Personal information
- Full name: Alex Frame
- Born: 18 June 1993 (age 33) Christchurch, New Zealand

Cycling career
- Sport: Cycling
- Disciplines: Track; Road
- Role: Rider

Amateur team
- 2021: Mike Greer Homes–Circuit Asphalt

Professional teams
- 2013: Thüringer Energie Team
- 2014: Development Team Giant–Shimano
- 2016–2017: JLT–Condor
- 2018–2019: Trek–Segafredo
Medal record
World Championships
| Gold medal – first place | 2015 Yvelines | Team pursuit |

Alex Frame (born 18 June 1993) is a New Zealand racing cyclist, who last rode for New Zealand amateur team Mike Greer Homes–Circuit Asphalt. He rode at the 2015 UCI Track Cycling World Championships, winning gold in the team pursuit.

== Major results ==
2011
UCI Junior Track Cycling World Championships

3rd Points race
3rd Team pursuit

2013
National Road Championships

3rd Under-23 road race
5th Time trial

6th Overall Boucle de l'Artois
9th Overall New Zealand Cycle Classic
2014
8th Velothon Berlin
2015
1st Team pursuit, UCI Track World Championships
National Track Championships

1st Scratch
2nd Individual pursuit

8th Overall Rás Tailteann
2016
1st Scratch, National Track Championships
1st Stage 7 Tour of Southland
2017
New Zealand Cycle Classic

1st Stages 3 & 5

1st Stage 2 Tour du Loir-et-Cher
Istrian Spring Trophy

1st Prologue & Stage 3

3rd Trofej Umag
5th Poreč Trophy
