= Joost van der Burg =

Dutch cyclist

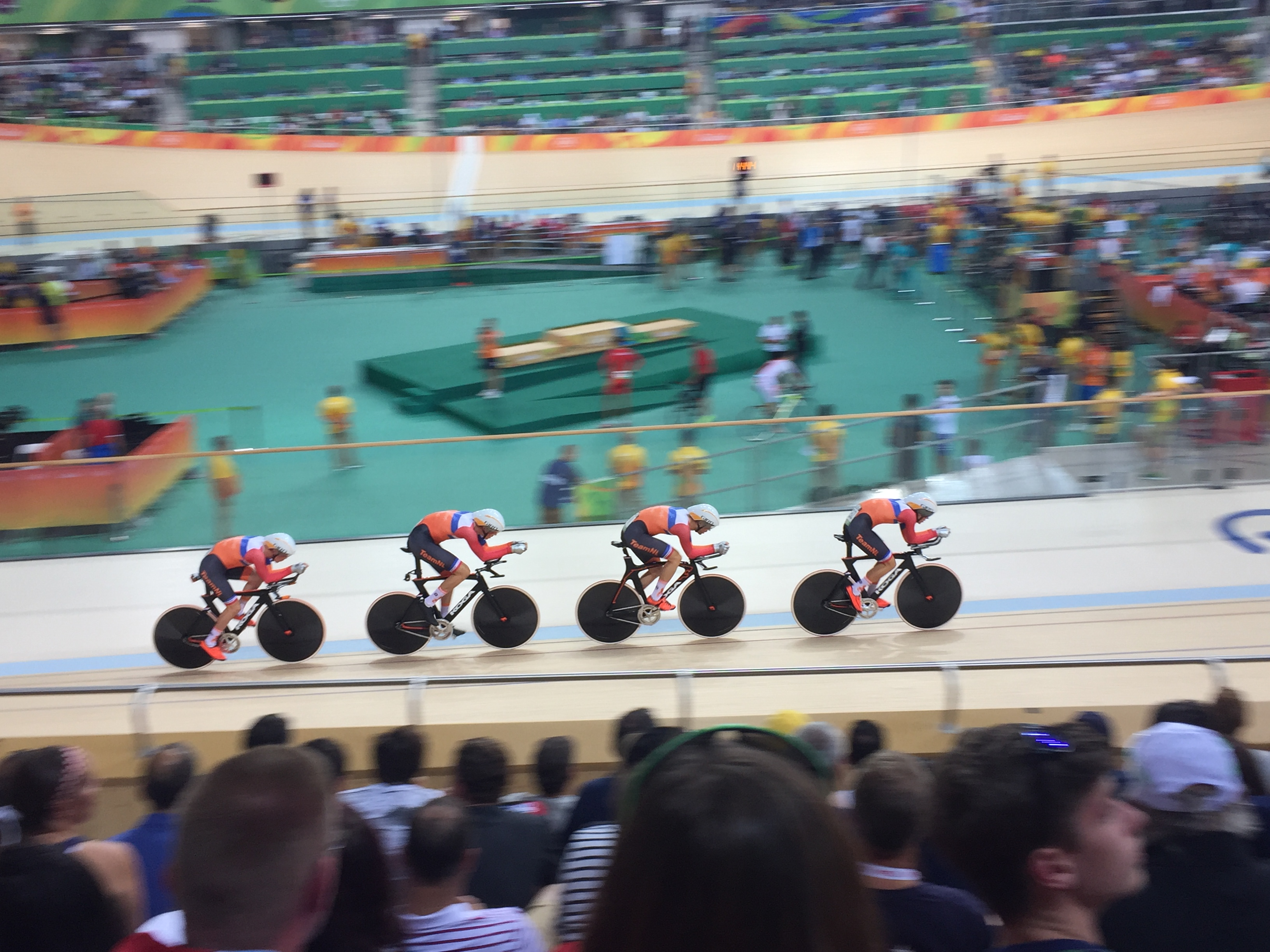
- Van der Burg riding at the 2016 Summer Olympics

Personal information
- Born: 11 December 1993 (age 32)

Cycling career
- Sport: Cycling
- Role: Rider

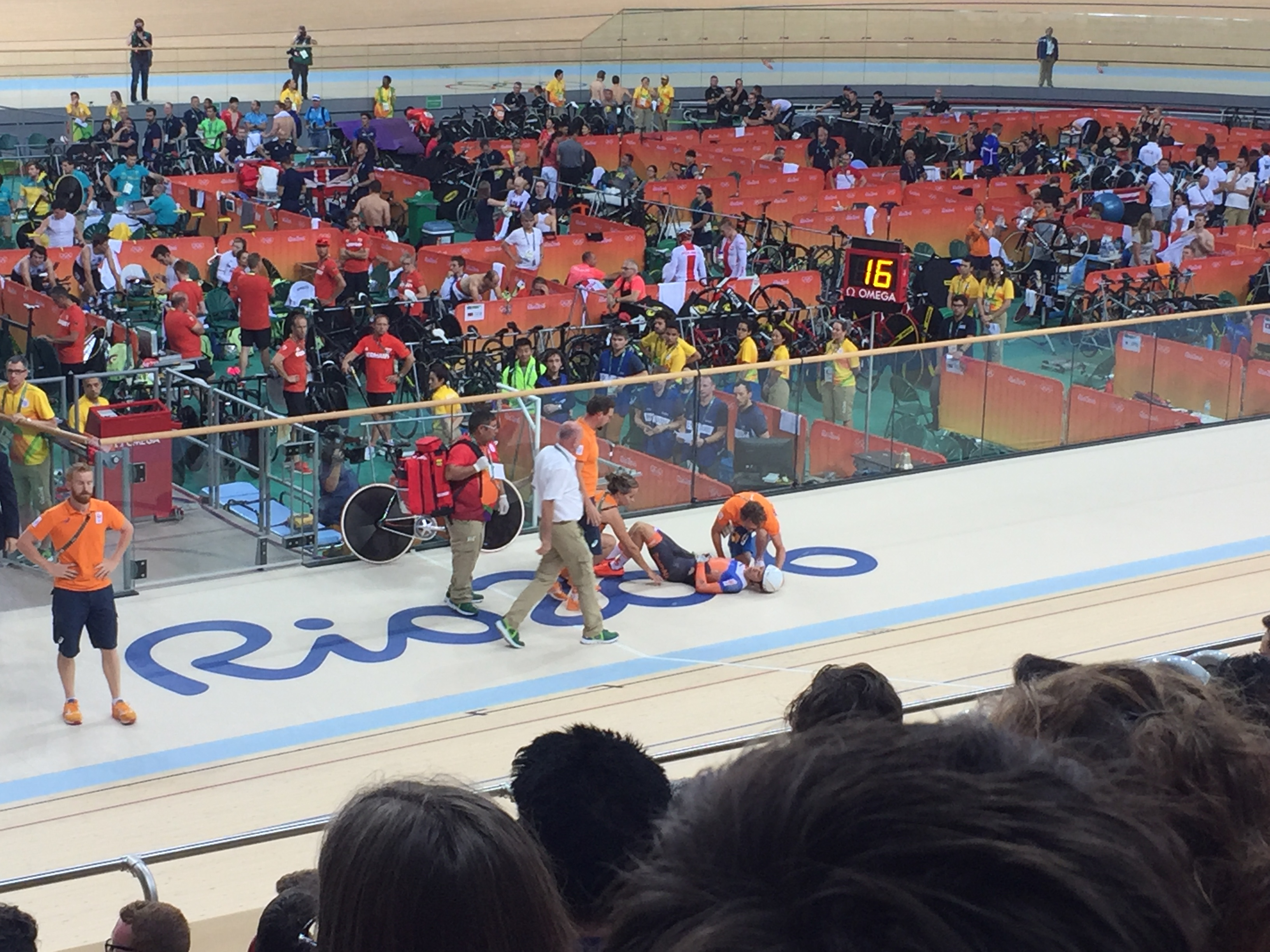
Van der Burg after he crashed at the 2016 Summer Olympics.

Joost van der Burg (born 11 December 1993) is a Dutch professional racing cyclist. He rode in the men's team pursuit at the 2016 UCI Track Cycling World Championships but he crashed in the qualification.
