= Melissa Erickson =

American cyclist (born 1990)

Personal information
- Nickname: Missy
- Born: May 9, 1990 (age 36) Alexandria, Minnesota, U.S.
- Height: 5 ft 5 in (165 cm)
- Weight: 140 lb (64 kg)

Cycling career
- Sport: Cycling
- Current team: ERO Sports Pennsylvania
- Discipline: Track cycling

Melissa "Missy" Erickson (born September 5, 1990) is a track cyclist from the United States. She represented her nation at the 2015 UCI Track Cycling World Championships.

== Personal life ==
Erickson grew up in Alexandria, Minnesota. In 2015, she was involved in a cycling accident and sustained heavy injuries. In 2017 she opened up to the Huffington Post about sexual abuse she experienced as a teenager. She now lives in Pennsylvania.

== Career results ==
2013
Los Angeles Grand Prix

1st Keirin
1st Team Sprint (with Tela Crane)
2nd Sprint

Challenge International sur piste

2nd Keirin
2nd Sprint

2014
Japan Track Cup 1

1st Sprint
2nd Keirin

Japan Track Cup 2

1st Sprint
3rd Keirin

1st Keirin, Keirin Revenge
1st Sprint, Champions of Sprint
Los Angeles Grand Prix

1st Keirin
2nd Sprint

2nd Keirin, Fastest Man on Wheels
2015
Marymoor Grand Prix

1st Keirin
1st Sprint

2016
1st Scratch Race, US Sprint GP
