= Wu Wenguo =

Chinese cyclist

Personal information
- Born: 8 February 1987 (age 39)

Cycling career
- Sport: Cycling
- Discipline: Track cycling
- Role: Rider
- Rider type: team pursuit

Wu Wenguo (born 8 February 1987) is a Chinese male track cyclist. He competed in the team pursuit event at the 2013 UCI Track Cycling World Championships.
