= Regan Gough =

New Zealand cyclist (born 1996)

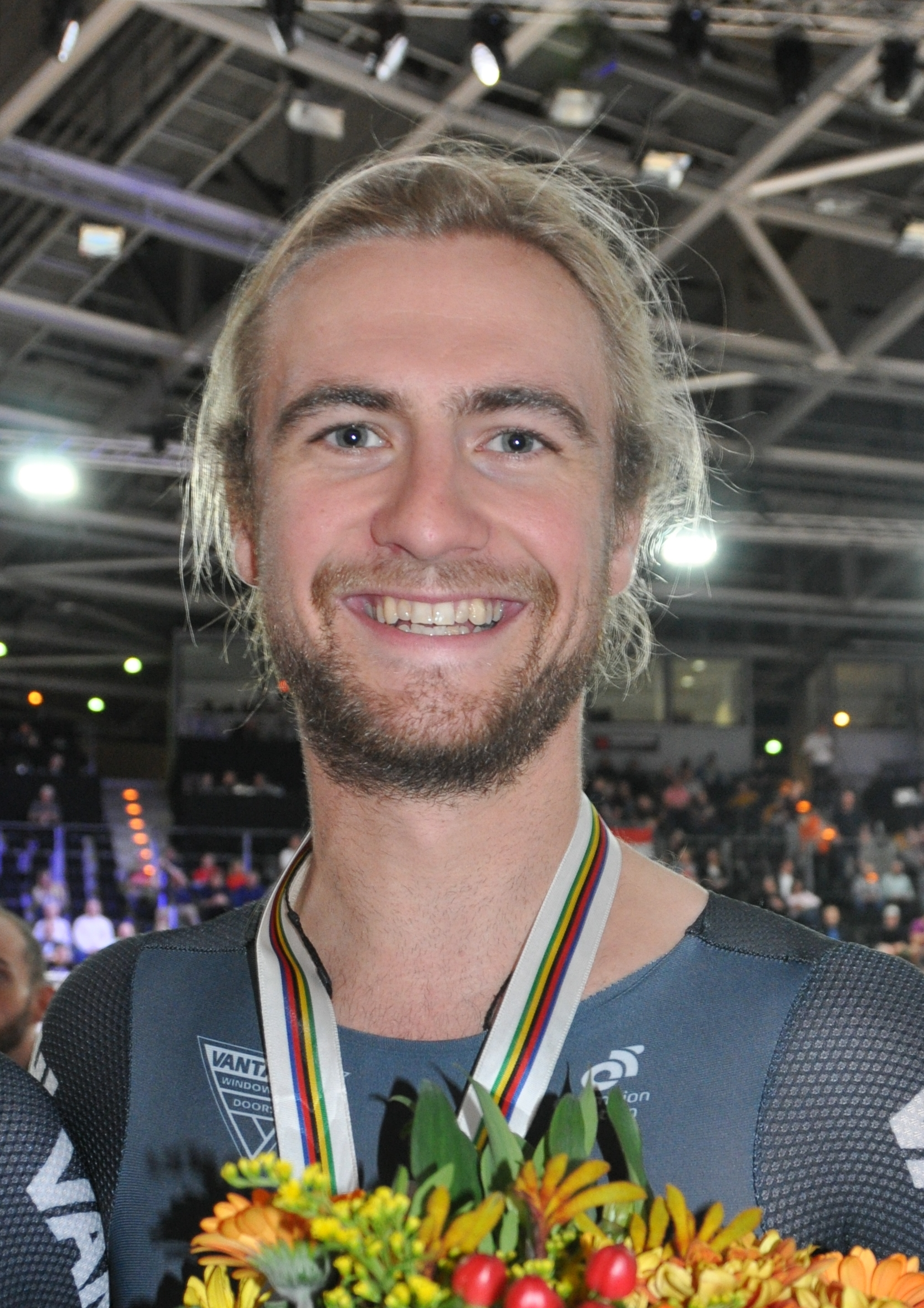
- Gough in 2020

Personal information
- Born: 6 October 1996 (age 30) Waipukurau, New Zealand
- Height: 1.83 m (6 ft 0 in)
- Weight: 71 kg (157 lb)

Cycling career
- Sport: Cycling
- Disciplines: Track, road
- Role: Rider

Professional teams
- 2015–2016: Avanti Racing Team
- 2017: An Post–Chain Reaction
- 2022–2023: Bolton Equities Black Spoke Pro Cycling

Major wins
- One-day races and Classics National Time Trial Championships (2022)
Medal record
Representing New Zealand
Men's track cycling
World Championships
Gold medal – first place	2015 Yvelines	Team pursuit
Silver medal – second place	2017 Hong Kong	Team pursuit
Silver medal – second place	2020 Berlin	Team pursuit

Regan Gough (born 6 October 1996) is a New Zealand professional track cyclist and road cyclist who last rode for UCI ProTeam Bolton Equities Black Spoke.

== Career ==
He rode at the 2015 UCI Track Cycling World Championships where he won gold in the team pursuit. He was first on stage two of the 2014 Tour de Vineyards. At the 2014 UCI Juniors Track World Championships he won the madison and points race junior titles. Alongside Pieter Bulling, Aaron Gate, and Dylan Kennett, he came fourth in the men's team pursuit at the 2016 Rio Olympics, being beaten by Denmark to the bronze medal.

In 2022, Gough won the National Time Trial Championships beating teammate Michael Vink by 1 minute 23 seconds.

== Major results ==
=== Track ===
2013
National Track Championships

1st Points race
2nd Scratch
2nd Individual pursuit

UCI Junior Track World Championships

2nd Madison
2nd Team pursuit

2014
UCI Junior Track World Championships

1st Points race
1st Madison (with Luke Mudgway)
2nd Individual pursuit
2nd Team pursuit

National Junior Track Championships

1st Individual pursuit
2nd Madison
2nd Omnium
2nd Scratch

2015
1st Team pursuit, UCI Track World Championships
National Track Championships

1st Points race
2nd Madison

Dublin Track Championships

1st Individual pursuit
1st Points race

UCI World Cup

2nd Team pursuit, Cambridge

2016
Oceania Track Championships

2nd Omnium
3rd Madison

2017
2nd Team pursuit, UCI Track World Championships
2nd Omnium, National Track Championships
2018
UCI World Cup

1st Team pursuit, Cambridge

2019
UCI World Cup

2nd Team pursuit, Brisbane
3rd Team pursuit, Cambridge

Oceania Track Championships

2nd Points race
3rd Omnium
3rd Madison

2020
1st Elimination race, National Track Championships
2nd Team pursuit, UCI Track World Championships
2021
National Track Championships

1st Omnium
1st Madison (with Tom Sexton)

=== Road ===
2013
1st Prologue Hawkes Bay 2-day Tour
2014
Tour of Taranaki

1st Stages 2 & 3

1st Prologue Hawkes Bay 2-day Tour
1st Stage 2 Tour de Vineyards
2015
1st Prologue Tour of Southland
2016
1st National Criterium Championships
1st Prologue Hawkes Bay 2-day Tour
1st Prologue Tour of Southland
2nd Lake Taupo Cycle Challenge Men's Classic
2017
National Under–23 Road Championships

1st Time trial
1st Road race

1st Stage 5 An Post Ras
2018
1st Overall Hawkes Bay 2-day Tour

1st Stage 2

2019
1st Gastown Grand Prix
2021
New Zealand Cycle Classic

1st Points classification
1st Stages 1 (TTT) & 3

2022
1st Time trial, National Road Championships
1st Stages 1 (TTT) & 5 New Zealand Cycle Classic

Awards
Preceded by Gabrielle Fa'amausili	Halberg Awards – Emerging Talent Award; 2014	Succeeded by Eliza McCartney
