= Zhao Kang =

Chinese cyclist

Personal information
- Born: 24 August 1992 (age 34)

Cycling career
- Sport: Cycling
- Discipline: Track cycling
- Role: Rider
- Rider type: Team pursuit

Professional teams
- 2013: China Hainan Yindongli
- 2014: Giant–Champion System
- 2015–2016: China Yindongli Hainan–Wildto
- 2017: Giant Cycling Team

Zhao Kang (born 24 August 1992) is a Chinese male track cyclist. He competed in the Team pursuit event at the 2013 UCI Track Cycling World Championships.
