= Rasmus Quaade =

Danish racing cyclist

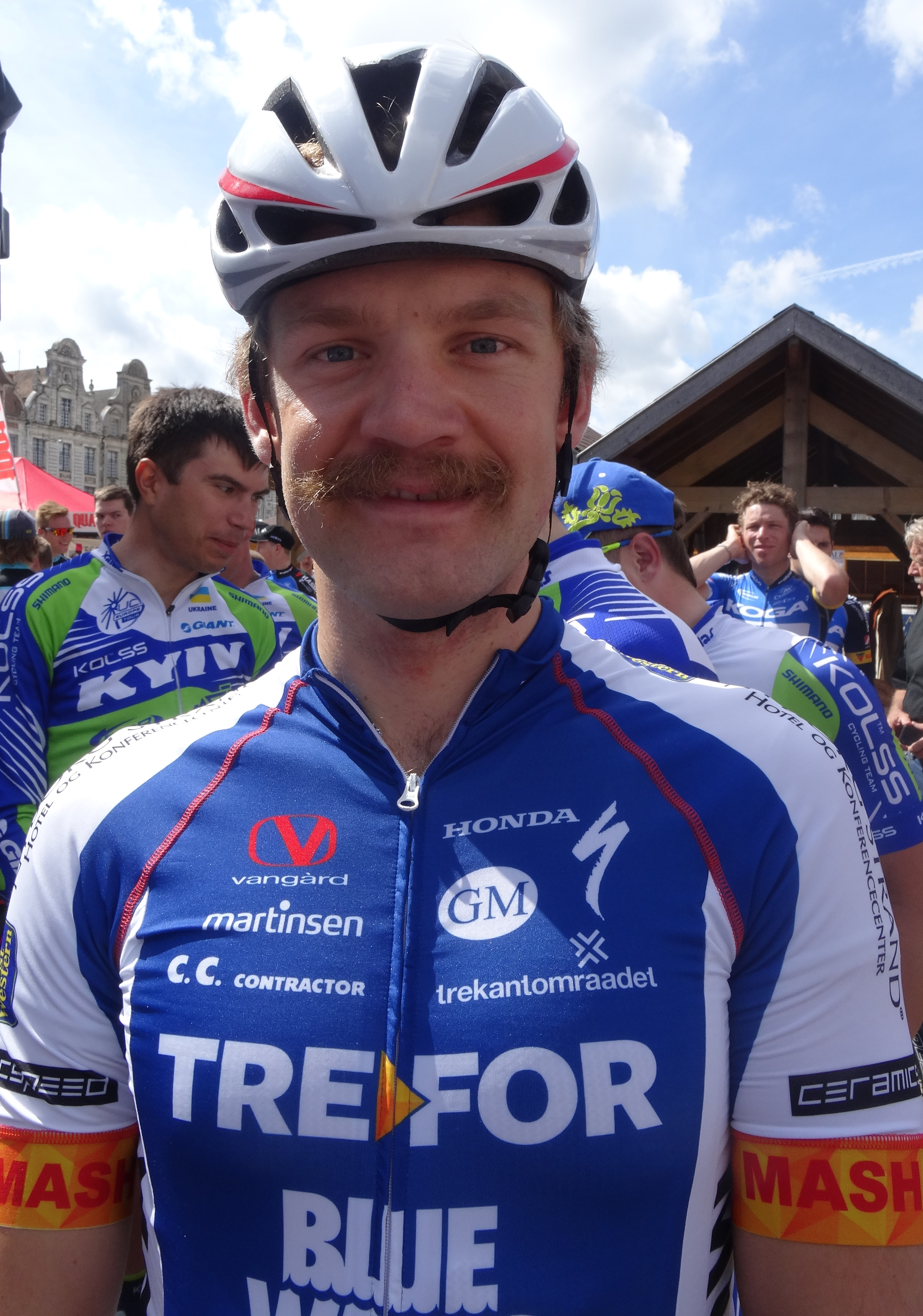
- Quaade at the 2014 Paris–Arras Tour

Personal information
- Full name: Rasmus Christian Quaade
- Born: 7 January 1990 (age 36) Valby, Denmark
- Height: 1.88 m (6 ft 2 in)
- Weight: 77 kg (170 lb)

Cycling career
- Sport: Cycling
- Current team: Retired
- Disciplines: Road; Track
- Role: Rider
- Rider type: Time trial specialist

Professional teams
- 2009: Blue Water–Cycling for Health
- 2010: Team Designa Køkken–Blue Water
- 2011: Concordia Forsikring–Himmerland
- 2012: Blue Water Cycling
- 2013–2014: Team TreFor
- 2015: Cult Energy Pro Cycling
- 2016: Stölting Service Group
- 2017: Team Giant–Castelli
- 2018: BHS–Almeborg Bornholm
- 2019–2021: Riwal Readynez

Major wins
- One-day races and Classics National Time Trial Championships (2011, 2014)
Medal record
Men's road bicycle racing
World Championships
| Silver medal – second place | 2011 Copenhagen | Under-23 time trial |
Men's track cycling
Olympic Games
| Bronze medal – third place | 2016 Rio de Janeiro | Team pursuit |
World Championships
| Silver medal – second place | 2014 Cali | Team Pursuit |
| Bronze medal – third place | 2013 Minsk | Team pursuit |
| Bronze medal – third place | 2016 London | Team pursuit |
European Elite Championships
| Silver medal – second place | 2011 Apeldoorn | Team Pursuit |
| Bronze medal – third place | 2015 Grenchen | Team pursuit |

Rasmus Christian Quaade (born 7 January 1990) is a Danish former road and track bicycle racer. He also competed professionally from 2009 to 2021 for the Blue Water Cycling (two spells), Team Designa Køkken–Blue Water, Team TreFor–Blue Water, Cult Energy Pro Cycling, Stölting Service Group, Team Giant–Castelli, BHS–Almeborg Bornholm and Riwal Readynez squads.

Quaade was also the subject for a documentary film, following him in the leadup to the 2011 UCI World Under-23 Road Race Championships, called Moon Rider.

== Major results ==
=== Road ===
2009
2nd Time trial, National Under-23 Road Championships
3rd Time trial, UEC European Under-23 Road Championships
4th Chrono Champenois
9th Time trial, UCI Under-23 Road World Championships
2010
1st Time trial, National Under-23 Road Championships
1st Chrono Champenois
2011
1st Time trial, National Road Championships
1st Time trial, National Under-23 Road Championships
2nd Time trial, UCI Under-23 Road World Championships
2nd Chrono Champenois
2012
1st Time trial, UEC European Under-23 Road Championships
1st Time trial, National Under-23 Road Championships
3rd Chrono Champenois
5th Time trial, UCI Under-23 Road World Championships
2013
2nd Time trial, National Road Championships
4th Chrono Champenois
6th Time trial, UCI Road World Championships
2014
1st Time trial, National Road Championships
1st Chrono Champenois
3rd Overall Giro della Regione Friuli Venezia Giulia
2015
2nd Time trial, National Road Championships
5th Time trial, European Games
5th Overall Tour du Poitou-Charentes
2016
9th Overall Four Days of Dunkirk
2017
3rd Overall Ronde de l'Oise

1st Stage 3

3rd Overall Flèche du Sud
3rd Scandinavian Race Uppsala
7th Overall Kreiz Breizh Elites
7th Overall Okolo Jižních Čech
10th Skive–Løbet
2018
1st Duo Normand (with Martin Toft Madsen)
1st Classic Loire-Atlantique
2nd Overall Danmark Rundt
3rd Time trial, National Road Championships
4th Overall Paris–Arras Tour
7th Hafjell GP
8th Sundvolden GP
9th Time trial, UEC European Road Championships
2019
1st Fyen Rundt
1st Duo Normand (with Mathias Norsgaard)
3rd Overall Danmark Rundt
3rd Hafjell GP
4th Chrono des Nations

=== Track ===
2011
2nd Team pursuit, UEC European Track Championships
3rd Team pursuit, 2011–12 UCI Track Cycling World Cup, Cali
2012
1st Team pursuit, 2012–13 UCI Track Cycling World Cup, Glasgow
2013
Team pursuit, 2013–14 UCI Track Cycling World Cup

2nd Aguascalientes
3rd Manchester

3rd Team pursuit, UCI Track World Championships
2014
2nd Team pursuit, UCI Track World Championships
3rd Team pursuit, 2014–15 UCI Track Cycling World Cup, London
2015
3rd Team pursuit, UEC European Track Championships
2016
3rd Team pursuit, Olympic Games
3rd Team pursuit, UCI Track World Championships
