= Steven Burke =

English cyclist (born 1988)

Steven Burke MBE
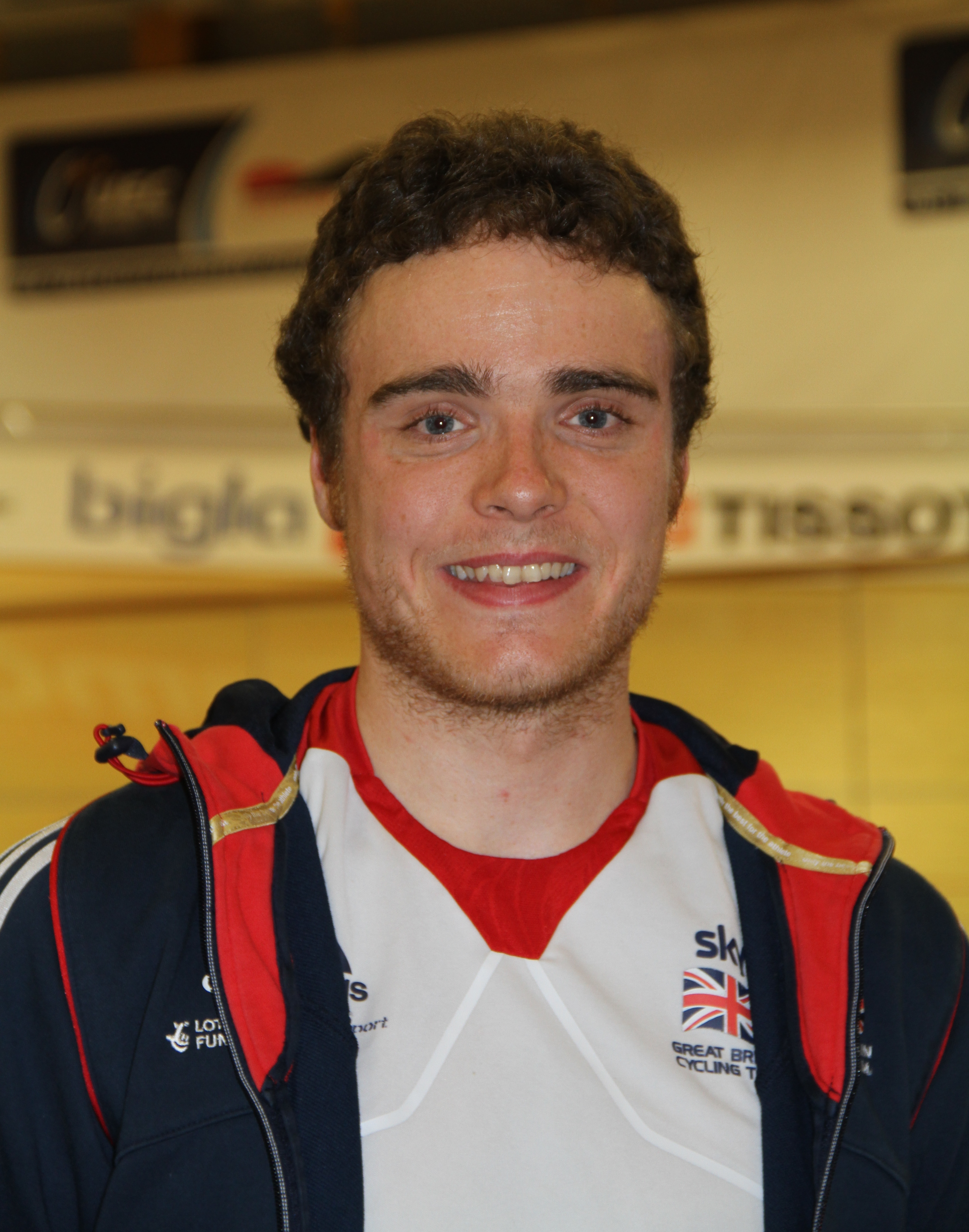
- Burke at the October 2015 UEC European Track Championships

Personal information
- Nickname: The Colne Cyclone
- Born: 4 March 1988 (age 38) Burnley, Lancashire, England
- Height: 1.83 m (6 ft 0 in)
- Weight: 74 kg (163 lb; 11.7 st)

Cycling career
- Sport: Cycling
- Current team: Team Wiggins Le Col
- Disciplines: Track, Road
- Role: Rider
- Rider type: Track Endurance

Amateur team
- 2007: Team 100% ME

Professional teams
- 2010: Motorpoint–Marshalls Pasta
- 2011: Team UK Youth
- 2012: Team IG–Sigma Sport
- 2013: Node 4–Giordana Racing
- 2014: Haribo-Beacon
- 2015–2018: WIGGINS

Major wins
- Track Olympic Games Team pursuit (2012, 2016) World Championships Team pursuit (2012)
Medal record
Men's track cycling
Representing Great Britain
Olympic Games
Gold medal – first place	2012 London	Team pursuit
Gold medal – first place	2016 Rio de Janeiro	Team pursuit
Bronze medal – third place	2008 Beijing	Individual pursuit
World Championships
Gold medal – first place	2012 Melbourne	Team pursuit
Silver medal – second place	2010 Ballerup	Team pursuit
Silver medal – second place	2013 Minsk	Team pursuit
Silver medal – second place	2015 Yvelines	Team pursuit
Silver medal – second place	2016 London	Team pursuit
Bronze medal – third place	2011 Apeldoorn	Team pursuit
European Championships
Gold medal – first place	2010 Pruszków	Team pursuit
Gold medal – first place	2011 Apeldoorn	Team pursuit
Gold medal – first place	2013 Apeldoorn	Team pursuit
Bronze medal – third place	2016 Yvelines	Team pursuit
Representing England
Commonwealth Games
Silver medal – second place	2014 Glasgow	Team pursuit

Steven James Burke MBE (born 4 March 1988) is a former English track and road cyclist, who rode for the now disbanded Team Wiggins Le Col cycling team. He represented Britain at the 2008 Summer Olympics, beating his pre Olympics personal best in the individual pursuit by eleven seconds, to take the bronze medal. He stood on the podium alongside his cycling idol, gold medallist Bradley Wiggins.

During 2012, Burke was part of the Great Britain team that won the Olympic and World Championships, in the Team Pursuit discipline. He was part of the GB Team, that retained the team pursuit title at the 2016 Olympics. Burke was appointed Member of the Order of the British Empire (MBE) in the 2013 New Year Honours on 29 December 2012, for services to cycling.

== Early life ==
Burke was born in Burnley and lived in Colne, Lancashire during his early life, attending Park High School and later Nelson and Colne College (which named its sports centre after him). Born into a cycling family, both Burke's grandfather Brian Wesson, and his mother Sharon, have competed at national level. His dad Alvin also was a cyclist and competed in many time trials.

He began attending Manchester Velodrome as a teenager, previously being more interested in football.

== Career ==
Despite specialising in the team pursuit, Burke has an impressive turn of speed, demonstrated by his success as a junior in the scratch and kilo events. He was consistently beating Mark Cavendish in sprints, during training in 2007.

Burke has an impressive Olympic Games record having never been beaten in the Team Pursuit. Burke took the decision to retire in 2019 after achieving his Olympic goal of retaining their TP title.

== Major results ==
=== Track ===
2005
National Junior Championships

1st Kilo
3rd Points race
3rd Scratch

1st Team pursuit, UEC European Under-23 Championships
2nd Team pursuit, UCI World Junior Championships
2006
1st Team pursuit, UEC European Under-23 Championships
3rd Team pursuit, UCI World Junior Championships
2007
UEC European Under-23 Championships

1st Team pursuit
3rd Individual pursuit

National Championships

1st Scratch
1st Team pursuit

1st Individual pursuit, National Junior Championships
3rd Team pursuit, UCI World Cup Classics, Manchester
2008
National Championships

1st Individual pursuit
3rd Kilo

3rd Individual pursuit, Olympic Games
2009
1st Individual pursuit, UEC European Under-23 Championships
1st Kilo, National Championships
2011
1st Team pursuit, UEC European Championships
1st Individual pursuit, National Championships
2012
1st Team pursuit, Olympic Games
1st Team pursuit, UCI World Championships
2013
1st Team pursuit, UEC European Championships
2nd Team pursuit, UCI World Championships
2014
UCI World Cup

1st Team pursuit, London
2nd Team pursuit, Guadalajara

2nd Team pursuit, Commonwealth Games
2nd Individual pursuit, National Championships
2015
1st Team pursuit, UEC European Championships
3rd Kilo, National Championships
2016
1st Team pursuit, Olympic Games

== World records ==
Discipline	Record	Date	Event	Velodrome	Ref
Team pursuit	3:53.295	4 April 2012	World Championships	Hisense Arena (Melbourne)	
Team pursuit	3:52.499	2 August 2012	Olympic Games	Lee Valley (London)	
Team pursuit	3:51.659	3 August 2012	Olympic Games	Lee Valley (London)	
Team pursuit	3:50.570	12 August 2016	Olympic Games	Rio Olympic	
Team pursuit	3:50.265	12 August 2016	Olympic Games	Rio Olympic	

== See also ==
- 2012 Summer Olympics and Paralympics gold post boxes
