= Mitchell Mulhern =

Australian cyclist (born 1991)

Personal information
- Born: 22 January 1991 (age 35)

Cycling career
- Sport: Cycling
- Role: Rider
Medal record
World Championships
Bronze medal – third place	2015 Yvelines	Team pursuit

Mitchell Mulhern (born 22 January 1991) is an Australian professional racing cyclist. He rode at the 2015 UCI Track Cycling World Championships.
