= Casper von Folsach =

Danish cyclist (born 1993)

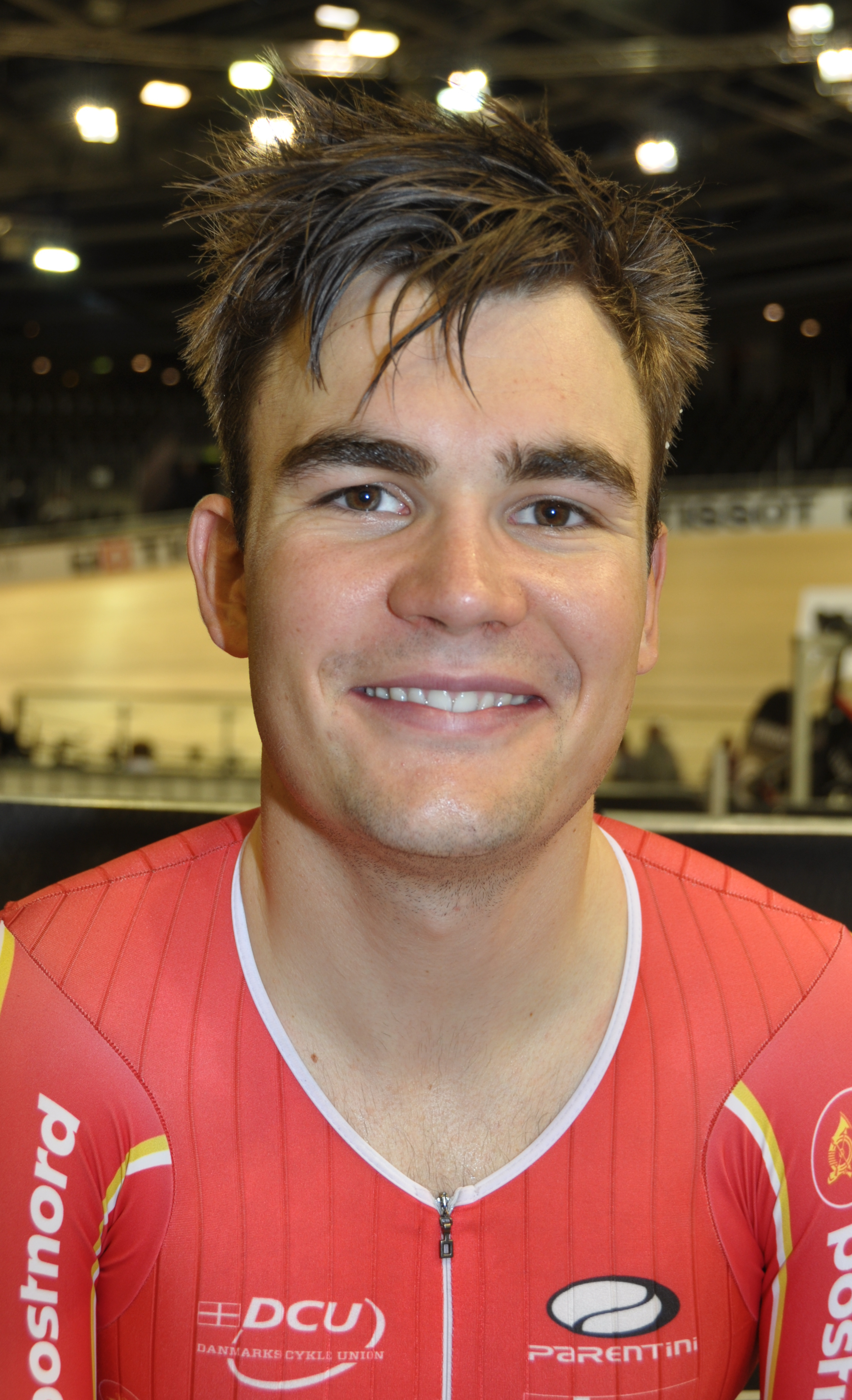
- Von Folsach in 2018

Personal information
- Full name: Casper von Folsach
- Born: 30 March 1993 (age 33) Gentofte, Denmark
- Height: 1.93 m (6 ft 4 in)
- Weight: 78 kg (172 lb)

Cycling career
- Sport: Cycling
- Disciplines: Road; Track
- Role: Rider

Professional teams
- 2012: Forsikring–Himmerland
- 2013–2014: Team TreFor
- 2015–2016: Riwal Platform
- 2017: Team Giant–Castelli
- 2018–2019: Team ColoQuick
Medal record
Men's track cycling
Representing Denmark
Olympic Games
Bronze medal – third place	2016 Rio de Janeiro	Team pursuit
World Championships
Silver medal – second place	2014 Cali	Team pursuit
Silver medal – second place	2018 Apeldoorn	Team pursuit
Silver medal – second place	2019 Pruszków	Madison
Bronze medal – third place	2013 Minsk	Team pursuit
Bronze medal – third place	2016 London	Team pursuit
Bronze medal – third place	2019 Pruszków	Team pursuit
European Championships
Silver medal – second place	2011 Apeldoorn	Team Pursuit
Bronze medal – third place	2018 Glasgow	Omnium

Casper von Folsach (born 30 March 1993) is a Danish road and track cyclist, who last rode for UCI Continental team Team ColoQuick. At the 2012 Summer Olympics, he competed in the Men's team pursuit for the national team.

He married Welsh cyclist Elinor Barker in October 2024; the couple have a son together.

== Major results ==
2011
1st Time trial, National Junior Road Championships
6th Time trial, UCI Junior Road World Championships
9th Overall Grand Prix Rüebliland
2013
2nd Time trial, National Under-23 Road Championships
3rd Road race, National Road Championships
2017
1st Stage 5 Okolo Jižních Čech
4th Kalmar Grand Prix
2018
1st Ronde van Midden-Nederland
2nd Gylne Gutuer
2nd Duo Normand (with Emil Vinjebo)
5th Hafjell GP
10th Omloop Mandel-Leie-Schelde
