= Fan Yang (cyclist) =

Chinese cyclist

Personal information
- Born: 3 January 1990 (age 36) Ürümqi, Xinjiang, China

Cycling career
- Sport: Cycling
- Discipline: Track cycling
- Role: Rider

Professional team
- 2015: China Yindongli Hainan–Wildto
Medal record
Men's track cycling
Representing China
Asian Championships
Gold medal – first place	2016 Izu	team pursuit

Fan Yang (born 3 January 1990) is a Chinese male track cyclist. He won the gold medal in the team pursuit at the 2016 Asian Cycling Championships.
