= Dylan Kennett =

New Zealand cyclist (born 1994)

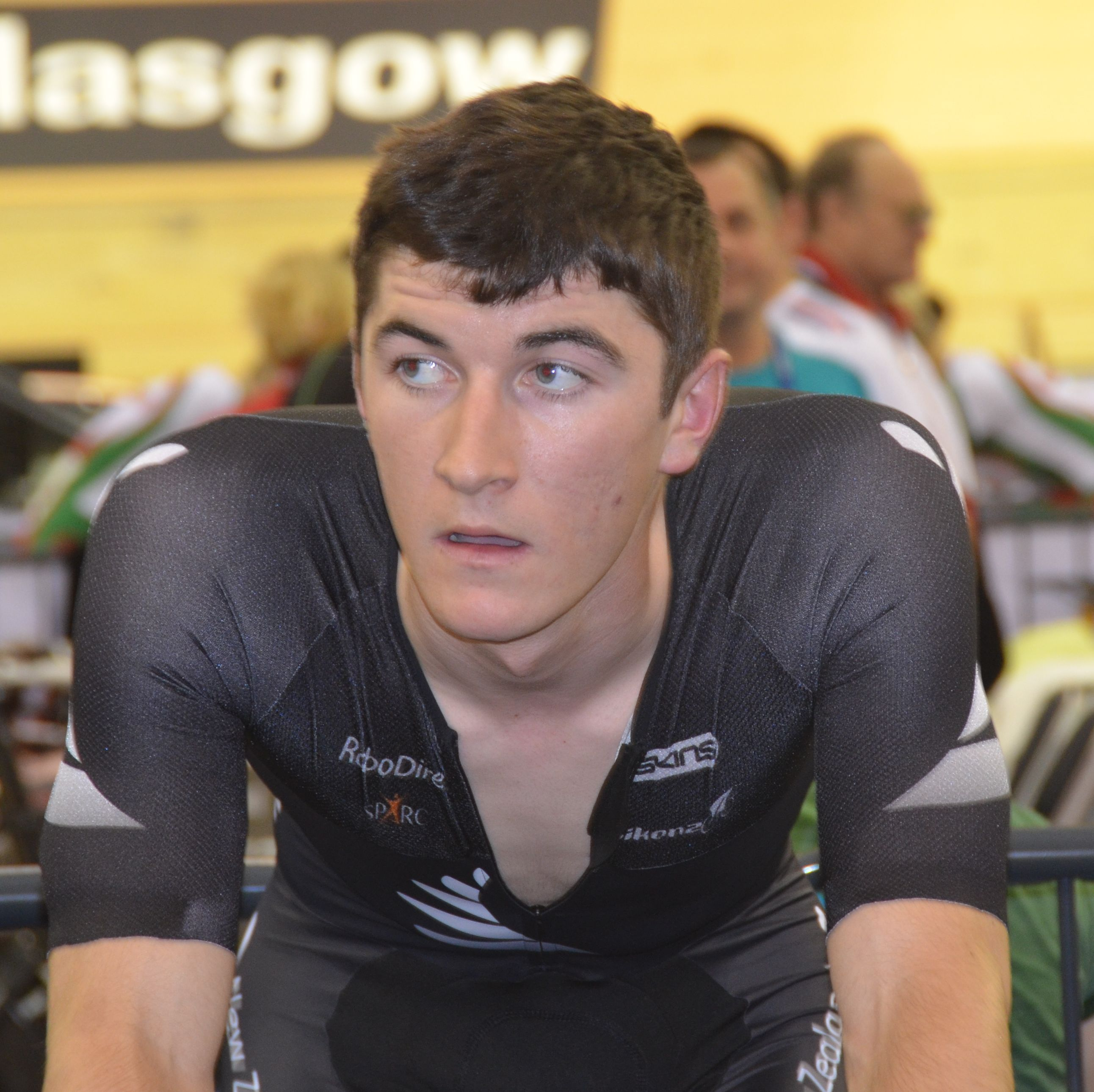
- Kennett in 2012

Personal information
- Born: 8 December 1994 (age 31) Christchurch, New Zealand

Cycling career
- Sport: Cycling
- Current team: St George Continental Cycling Team
- Disciplines: Road; Track
- Role: Rider

Professional team
- 2018–: St George Continental Cycling Team

Major wins
- Track Team pursuit, World Championships (2015)
Medal record
Representing New Zealand
Men's track cycling
World Championships
Gold medal – first place	2015 Yvelines	Team pursuit
Silver medal – second place	2017 Hong Kong	Team pursuit
Commonwealth Games
Bronze medal – third place	2018 Gold Coast	Individual pursuit

Dylan Kennett (born 8 December 1994) is a New Zealand professional racing cyclist, who currently rides for UCI Continental team St George Continental Cycling Team. Of Māori descent, Kennett affiliates to the Ngāi Tahu iwi.

Kennett rode at the 2015 UCI Track Cycling World Championships, winning gold in the team pursuit. Alongside Pieter Bulling, Aaron Gate, and Regan Gough, he came fourth in the men's team pursuit at the 2016 Rio Olympics, being beaten by Denmark to the bronze medal.

== Major results ==
2013
1st Six Days of Fiorenzuola (with Shane Archbold)
2015
1st Team pursuit, UCI Track World Championships
2nd Time trial, National Road Championships
2017
2nd Team pursuit, UCI Track World Championships
2018
Tour de Poyang Lake

1st Stages 2, 6 & 11

3rd Individual pursuit, Commonwealth Games
6th Overall Tour of Taihu Lake

1st Prologue & Stage 4

2019
1st Overall Tour of Taihu Lake

1st Points classification
1st Stage 3

2020
New Zealand Cycle Classic

1st Points classification
1st Stage 5

National Road Championships

3rd Road race
3rd Time trial
