= Pieter Bulling =

New Zealand cyclist

Personal information
- Born: 2 March 1993 (age 33) Invercargill, New Zealand

Cycling career
- Sport: Cycling
- Role: Rider
Medal record
Representing New Zealand
Men's track cycling
World Championships
Gold medal – first place	2015 Yvelines	Team pursuit
Silver medal – second place	2017 Hong Kong	Team pursuit

Pieter Bulling (born 2 March 1993) is a New Zealand professional racing cyclist. He rode at the 2015 UCI Track Cycling World Championships, winning gold in the team pursuit. Of Māori descent, Bulling affiliates to the Ngāi Tahu iwi. Alongside Aaron Gate, Regan Gough, and Dylan Kennett, he came fourth in the men's team pursuit at the 2016 Rio Olympics, being beaten by Denmark to the bronze medal.

He is now a commercial jet boat driver for Shotover Jet in Queenstown, featuring in their 60th anniversary documentary, Kimiākau - Sixty Years of Shotover Jet - A Story of Thrill, Whenua, and Legacy.
