= Cycling at the 2020 Summer Olympics – Men's team pursuit =

Men's team pursuit at the Games of the XXXII Olympiad
- Olympic track cycling
- Venues: Izu Velodrome
- Dates: 2–4 August 2021
- Competitors: 37 from 8 nations
- Teams: 8
- Winning time: 3:42.032 WR

Medalists
| 1st place, gold medalist(s) | | Simone Consonni; Filippo Ganna; Francesco Lamon; Jonathan Milan | Italy |
| 2nd place, silver medalist(s) | | Lasse Norman Hansen; Niklas Larsen; Frederik Rodenberg; Rasmus Pedersen | Denmark |
| 3rd place, bronze medalist(s) | | Kelland O'Brien; Sam Welsford; Leigh Howard; Luke Plapp; Alexander Porter | Australia |

The men's team pursuit event at the 2020 Summer Olympics took place from 2 to 4 August 2021 at the Izu Velodrome. 32 cyclists (8 teams of 4) from 8 nations competed.

== Background ==
This was the 25th appearance of the event, which has been held at every Summer Olympics since its introduction in 1908 except for 1912, when no track cycling was held.

The reigning Olympic champions were Ed Clancy, Steven Burke, Owain Doull, and Bradley Wiggins of Great Britain; Great Britain had won the last three Olympic events (with Clancy on the team for all three, Wiggins for the first and third, and Burke for the last two). The reigning (2020) World Champions were Lasse Norman Hansen, Julius Johansen, Frederik Rodenberg, and Rasmus Pedersen of Denmark.

In a particularly competitive event in 2021, Australia, New Zealand, Denmark, Italy, and Germany were all tipped to challenge British dominance in the event.

== Qualification ==
A National Olympic Committee (NOC) could enter up to 1 team of 4 cyclists in the team pursuit. Quota places are allocated to the NOC, which selects the cyclists. Qualification was entirely through the 2018–20 UCI nation rankings. The eight top nations in the rankings qualify for the team pursuit event. These nations also automatically qualified a team in the Madison. Because qualification was complete by the end of the 2020 UCI Track Cycling World Championships on 1 March 2020 (the last event that contributed to the 2018–20 rankings), qualification was unaffected by the COVID-19 pandemic.

== Competition format ==
A team pursuit race involves two teams of four cyclists. Each team starts at opposite sides of the track. There are two ways to win: finish 16 laps (4 km) before the other team does or catch the other team. The time for each team is determined by the third cyclist to cross the finish line; the fourth cyclist does not need to finish.

The tournament consists of three rounds:

- Qualifying round: Each team does a time trial for seeding. Only the top 4 teams are able to compete for the gold medal; the 5th place and lower teams can do no better than bronze.
- First round: Four heats of 2 teams each. The top 4 teams are seeded against each other (1 vs. 4, 2 vs. 3) while the bottom 4 teams are seeded against each other (5 vs. 8, 6 vs. 7). The winners of the top bracket advance to the gold medal final. The other 6 teams are ranked by time and advance to finals based on those rankings.
- Finals: Four finals, each with 2 teams. There is a gold medal final (gold and silver medals), a bronze medal final (bronze medal and 4th place), and 5th/6th and 7th/8th classification finals.

== Schedule ==
All times are Japan Standard Time (UTC+9)

| Date | Time | Round |
|---|---|---|
| 2 August | 17:02 | Qualifying |
| 3 August | 16:22 | First round |
| 4 August | 17:45 | Finals |

== Results ==
=== Qualifying ===
| Rank | Country | Cyclists | Result | Notes |
|---|---|---|---|---|
| 1 | Denmark | Lasse Norman Hansen; Niklas Larsen; Frederik Rodenberg; Rasmus Pedersen | 3:45.014 | OR |
| 2 | Italy | Simone Consonni; Filippo Ganna; Francesco Lamon; Jonathan Milan | 3:45.895 | |
| 3 | New Zealand | Aaron Gate; Campbell Stewart; Regan Gough; Jordan Kerby | 3:46.079 | |
| 4 | Great Britain | Ethan Hayter; Ed Clancy; Ethan Vernon; Oliver Wood | 3:47.507 | |
| 5 | Australia | Kelland O'Brien; Sam Welsford; Leigh Howard; Alexander Porter | 3:48.448 | |
| 6 | Canada | Vincent De Haître; Michael Foley; Derek Gee; Jay Lamoureux | 3:50.455 | |
| 7 | Germany | Theo Reinhardt; Felix Groß; Leon Rohde; Domenic Weinstein | 3:50.830 | |
| 8 | Switzerland | Robin Froidevaux; Stefan Bissegger; Mauro Schmid; Cyrille Thièry | 3:51.514 | |

=== First round ===
| Rank | Heat | Country | Cyclists | Result | Notes |
|---|---|---|---|---|---|
| 1 | 3 | Italy | Simone Consonni; Filippo Ganna; Francesco Lamon; Jonathan Milan | 3:42.307 | QG, WR |
| 2 | 4 | Denmark | Lasse Norman Hansen; Niklas Larsen; Frederik Rodenberg; Rasmus Pedersen | | QG |
| 3 | 3 | New Zealand | Aaron Gate; Campbell Stewart; Regan Gough; Jordan Kerby | 3:42.397 | QB |
| 4 | 2 | Australia | Kelland O'Brien; Sam Welsford; Leigh Howard; Luke Plapp | 3:44.902 | QB |
| 5 | 1 | Canada | Vincent De Haître; Michael Foley; Derek Gee; Jay Lamoureux | 3:46.769 | |
| 6 | 1 | Germany | Theo Reinhardt; Felix Groß; Leon Rohde; Domenic Weinstein | 3:48.861 | |
| 7 | 2 | Switzerland | Théry Schir; Stefan Bissegger; Valère Thiébaud; Cyrille Thièry | 3:49.111 | |
| 8 | 4 | Great Britain | Ethan Hayter; Charlie Tanfield; Ethan Vernon; Oliver Wood | 4:28.489 | |

Denmark caught the team from Great Britain, thereby advancing to the Gold Medal final, but did not record a time as their third rider crashed into the caught third British rider, who had lost contact to the front two of his team.

=== Finals ===
| Rank | Country | Cyclists | Result | Notes |
|---|---|---|---|---|
Gold medal final
| 1st place, gold medalist(s) | Italy | Simone Consonni; Filippo Ganna; Francesco Lamon; Jonathan Milan | 3:42.032 | WR |
| 2nd place, silver medalist(s) | Denmark | Lasse Norman Hansen; Niklas Larsen; Frederik Rodenberg; Rasmus Pedersen | 3:42.198 | |
Bronze medal final
| 3rd place, bronze medalist(s) | Australia | Kelland O'Brien; Sam Welsford; Leigh Howard; Luke Plapp | | |
| 4 | New Zealand | Aaron Gate; Campbell Stewart; Regan Gough; Jordan Kerby | OVL | |
Fifth place final
| 5 | Canada | Vincent De Haître; Michael Foley; Derek Gee; Jay Lamoureux | 3:46.324 | |
| 6 | Germany | Roger Kluge; Felix Groß; Leon Rohde; Domenic Weinstein | 3:50.023 | |
Seventh place final
| 7 | Great Britain | Ethan Hayter; Charlie Tanfield; Ethan Vernon; Oliver Wood | 3:45.636 | |
| 8 | Switzerland | Robin Froidevaux; Stefan Bissegger; Valère Thiébaud; Cyrille Thièry | 3:50.041 | |
