= 2020 UCI Track Cycling World Championships – Men's team pursuit =

Men's team pursuit at the 2020 UCI Track Cycling World Championships
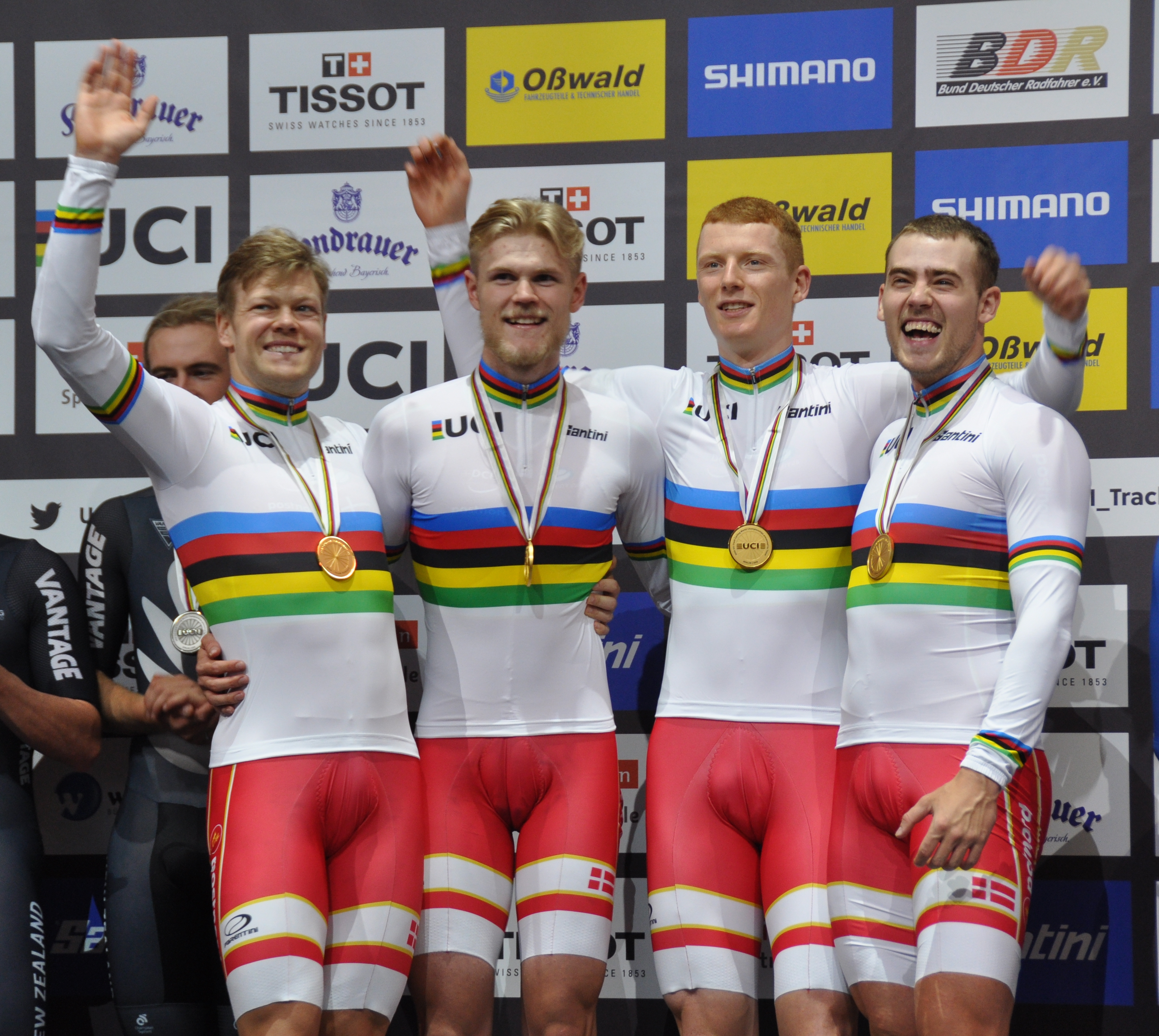
- Danish world champions (from left): Lasse Norman Hansen, Julius Johansen, Frederik Rodenberg, and Rasmus Pedersen
- Venue: Velodrom
- Location: Berlin, Germany
- Dates: 26–27 February
- Competitors: 57 from 13 nations
- Teams: 13
- Winning time: 3:44.672

Medalists
gold medal	Lasse Norman Hansen; Julius Johansen; Frederik Rodenberg; Rasmus Pedersen	Denmark
silver medal	Campbell Stewart; Corbin Strong; Aaron Gate; Jordan Kerby; Regan Gough	New Zealand
bronze medal	Simone Consonni; Filippo Ganna; Francesco Lamon; Jonathan Milan; Michele Scartezzini	Italy

The Men's team pursuit competition at the 2020 UCI Track Cycling World Championships was held on 26 and 27 February 2020.

== Results ==
=== Qualifying ===
The qualifying was started on 26 February at 14:21. The eight fastest teams advanced to the first round.

Rank	Nation	Time	Behind	Notes
1	Denmark; Lasse Norman Hansen; Julius Johansen; Frederik Rodenberg; Rasmus Pedersen	3:46.579		Q, WR
2	New Zealand; Campbell Stewart; Aaron Gate; Regan Gough; Jordan Kerby	3:48.742	+2.163	Q
3	France; Benjamin Thomas; Thomas Denis; Corentin Ermenault; Valentin Tabellion	3:49.558	+2.979	Q
4	Italy; Michele Scartezzini; Simone Consonni; Filippo Ganna; Francesco Lamon	3:49.995	+3.416	Q
5	Australia; Leigh Howard; Luke Plapp; Alexander Porter; Sam Welsford	3:50.015	+3.436	q
6	Germany; Felix Groß; Theo Reinhardt; Nils Schomber; Domenic Weinstein	3:50.304	+3.725	q
7	Great Britain; Ed Clancy; Ethan Hayter; Charlie Tanfield; Oliver Wood	3:50.341	+3.762	q
8	Switzerland; Cyrille Thièry; Stefan Bissegger; Robin Froidevaux; Claudio Imhof	3:52.888	+6.309	q
9	Japan; Ryo Chikatani; Shunsuke Imamura; Kazushige Kuboki; Keitaro Sawada	3:52.956	+6.377	
10	Russia; Nikita Bersenev; Lev Gonov; Ivan Smirnov; Kirill Sveshnikov	3:53.523	+6.944	
11	Canada; Derek Gee; Michael Foley; Adam Jamieson; Jay Lamoureux	3:54.469	+7.890	
12	Belarus; Raman Tsishkou; Yauheni Akhramenka; Yauheni Karaliok; Hardzei Tsishchanka	4:00.955	+14.376	
13	Ukraine; Volodymyr Dzhus; Vitaliy Hryniv; Roman Gladysh; Maksym Vasyliev	4:04.735	+18.156	

=== First round ===
The first round was started on 26 February at 20:48.

First round heats were held as follows:
Heat 1: 6th v 7th fastest
Heat 2: 5th v 8th fastest
Heat 3: 2nd v 3rd fastest
Heat 4: 1st v 4th fastest

The winners of heats three and four advanced to the gold medal race. The remaining six teams were ranked on time, from which the top two proceeded to the bronze medal race.

Rank	Heat	Nation	Time	Behind	Notes
1	1	Great Britain; Ed Clancy; Ethan Hayter; Charlie Tanfield; Oliver Wood	3:51.561		
2	1	Germany; Felix Groß; Theo Reinhardt; Leon Rohde; Domenic Weinstein	3:53.577	+2.016	
1	2	Australia; Luke Plapp; Alexander Porter; Cameron Scott; Sam Welsford	3:48.625		QB
2	2	Switzerland; Stefan Bissegger; Robin Froidevaux; Claudio Imhof; Lukas Rüegg	3:51.665	+3.040	
1	3	New Zealand; Campbell Stewart; Aaron Gate; Regan Gough; Jordan Kerby	3:47.501		QG
2	3	France; Benjamin Thomas; Thomas Denis; Corentin Ermenault; Valentin Tabellion	3:54.124	+6.623	
1	4	Denmark; Lasse Norman Hansen; Julius Johansen; Frederik Rodenberg; Rasmus Pedersen	3:46.203		QG, WR
2	4	Italy; Simone Consonni; Filippo Ganna; Francesco Lamon; Jonathan Milan	3:46.513	+0.310	QB

- QG = qualified for gold medal final
- QB = qualified for bronze medal final

=== Finals ===
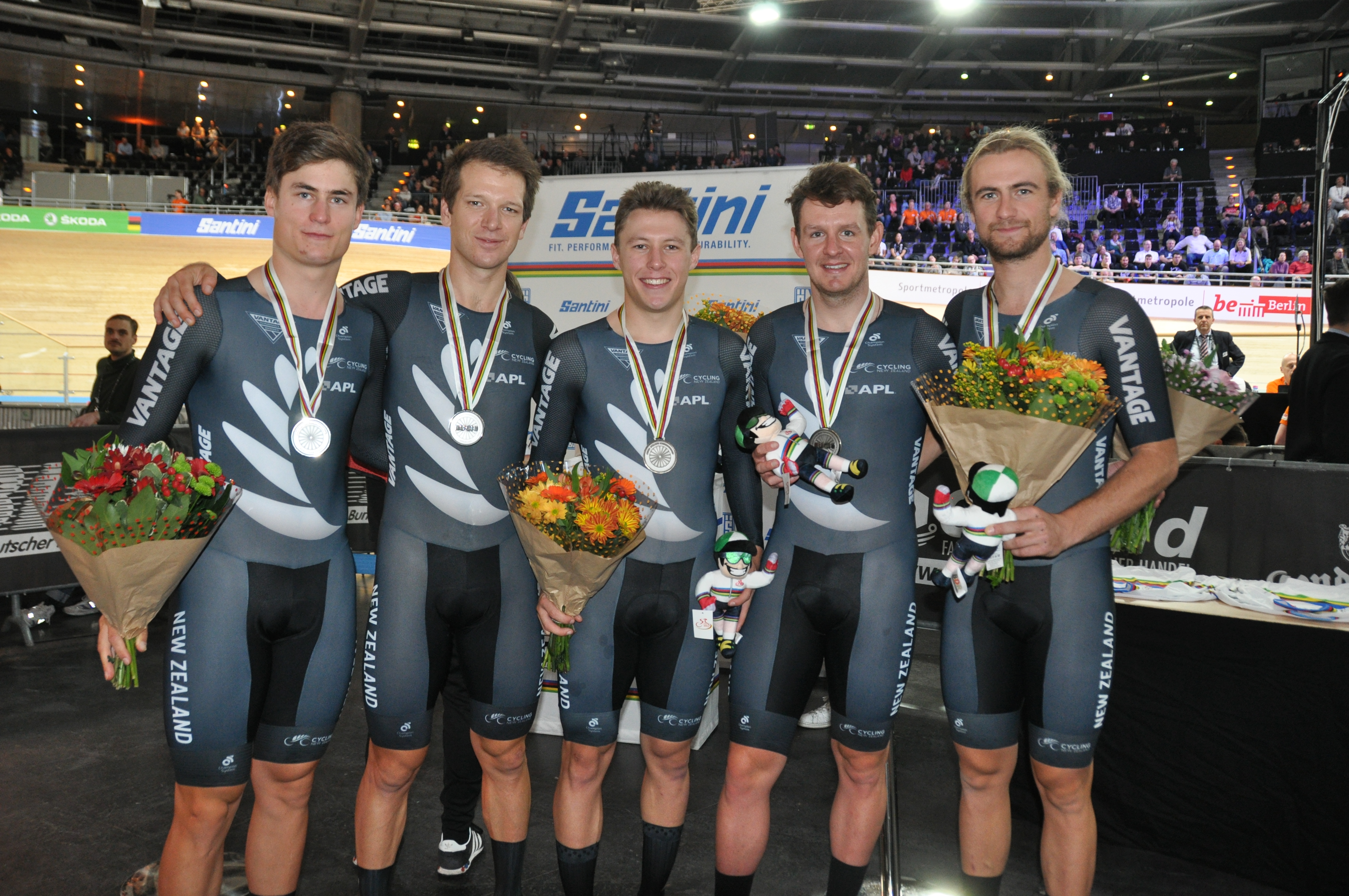
Silver medal winners from New Zealand (from left): Campbell Stewart, Aaron Gate, Corbin Strong, Jordan Kerby, and Regan Gough (replaced in final by Strong)

The finals were started at 19:25.

Rank	Nation	Time	Behind	Notes
Gold medal race
1st place, gold medalist(s)	Denmark; Lasse Norman Hansen; Julius Johansen; Frederik Rodenberg; Rasmus Pedersen	3:44.672		WR
2nd place, silver medalist(s)	New Zealand; Campbell Stewart; Corbin Strong; Aaron Gate; Jordan Kerby	3:49.713	+5.041	
Bronze medal race
3rd place, bronze medalist(s)	Italy; Simone Consonni; Filippo Ganna; Francesco Lamon; Jonathan Milan	3:47.511		
4	Australia; Leigh Howard; Luke Plapp; Alexander Porter; Sam Welsford	OVL		
