= 2019 UEC European Track Championships – Men's team pursuit =

Men's team pursuit at the 2019 UEC European Track Championships
- Venue: Omnisport Apeldoorn, Apeldoorn
- Date: 16–17 October
- Competitors: 47 from 11 nations
- Winning time: 3:49.113

Medalists
gold medal	Lasse Norman Hansen; Julius Johansen; Frederik Madsen; Rasmus Pedersen	Denmark
silver medal	Michele Scartezzini; Filippo Ganna; Francesco Lamon; Davide Plebani; Simone Consonni	Italy
bronze medal	Ed Clancy; Ethan Hayter; Charlie Tanfield; Oliver Wood	Great Britain

The men's team pursuit competition at the 2019 UEC European Track Championships was held on 16 and 17 October 2019.

== Results ==
=== Qualifying ===
The eight fastest teams advanced to the first round.

Rank	Name	Nation	Time	Behind	Notes
1	Lasse Norman Hansen; Julius Johansen; Frederik Madsen; Rasmus Pedersen	Denmark	3:51.833		Q
2	Ed Clancy; Ethan Hayter; Charlie Tanfield; Oliver Wood	Great Britain	3:53.219	+1.385	Q
3	Simone Consonni; Filippo Ganna; Francesco Lamon; Davide Plebani	Italy	3:53.934	+2.101	Q
4	Felix Groß; Theo Reinhardt; Leon Rohde; Nils Schomber	Germany	3:55.677	+3.843	Q
5	Stefan Bissegger; Claudio Imhof; Théry Schir; Cyrille Thièry	Switzerland	3:55.909	+4.076	q
6	Corentin Ermenault; Florian Maitre; Valentin Tabellion; Benjamin Thomas	France	3:56.159	+4.325	q
7	Szymon Krawczyk; Bartosz Rudyk; Szymon Sajnok; Daniel Staniszewski	Poland	3:56.328	+4.495	q
8	Kenny De Ketele; Robbe Ghys; Rune Herregodts; Sasha Weemaes	Belgium	3:57.211	+5.378	q
9	Lev Gonov; Ivan Smirnov; Gleb Syritsa; Nikita Bersenev	Russia	3:57.255	+5.421	
10	Yauheni Akhramenka; Yauheni Karaliok; Mikhail Shemetau; Raman Tsishkou	Belarus	4:01.545	+9.712	
11	Volodymyr Dzhus; Roman Gladysh; Vitaliy Hryniv; Kyrylo Tsarenko	Ukraine	4:07.472	+15.639	

=== First round ===
First round heats were held as follows:
Heat 1: 6th v 7th fastest
Heat 2: 5th v 8th fastest
Heat 3: 2nd v 3rd fastest
Heat 4: 1st v 4th fastest

The winners of heats 3 and 4 proceeded to the gold medal race. The remaining six teams were ranked on time, from which the top two proceeded to the bronze medal race.

Rank	Heat	Name	Nation	Time	Notes
1	4	Lasse Norman Hansen; Julius Johansen; Frederik Madsen; Rasmus Pedersen	Denmark	3:48.762	QG
2	3	Simone Consonni; Filippo Ganna; Francesco Lamon; Davide Plebani	Italy	3:51.604	QG
3	3	Ed Clancy; Ethan Hayter; Charlie Tanfield; Oliver Wood	Great Britain	3:52.230	QB
4	2	Stefan Bissegger; Claudio Imhof; Valère Thiébaud; Cyrille Thièry	Switzerland	3:52.860	QB
5	4	Felix Groß; Theo Reinhardt; Domenic Weinstein; Nils Schomber	Germany	3:53.974	
6	1	Corentin Ermenault; Florian Maitre; Valentin Tabellion; Benjamin Thomas	France	3:55.686	
7	2	Kenny De Ketele; Robbe Ghys; Rune Herregodts; Sasha Weemaes	Belgium	3:57.985	
8	1	Szymon Krawczyk; Bartosz Rudyk; Szymon Sajnok; Daniel Staniszewski	Poland	4:01.376	

=== Finals ===
Rank	Name	Nation	Time	Behind	Notes
Gold medal final
1st place, gold medalist(s)	Lasse Norman Hansen; Julius Johansen; Frederik Madsen; Rasmus Pedersen	Denmark	3:49.113		
2nd place, silver medalist(s)	Michele Scartezzini; Filippo Ganna; Francesco Lamon; Davide Plebani	Italy	3:54.117	+5.004	
Bronze medal final
3rd place, bronze medalist(s)	Ed Clancy; Ethan Hayter; Charlie Tanfield; Oliver Wood	Great Britain	3:51.428		
4	Stefan Bissegger; Claudio Imhof; Valère Thiébaud; Cyrille Thièry	Switzerland	3:54.278	+2.850	
