= Cycling at the 2018 Commonwealth Games – Men's team pursuit =

Cycling Track – Men's team pursuit at the 2018 Commonwealth Games
- Venue: Anna Meares Velodrome
- Dates: 5 April
- Competitors: 30 from 7 nations
- Winning time: 3:49.804 WR, GR

Medalists
gold medal	Alex Porter; Sam Welsford; Leigh Howard; Kelland O'Brien; Jordan Kerby	Australia
silver medal	Oliver Wood; Kian Emadi; Charlie Tanfield; Ethan Hayter	England
bronze medal	Michael Foley; Jay Lamoureux; Derek Gee; Aidan Caves; Adam Jamieson	Canada

The men's team pursuit at the 2018 Commonwealth Games was part of the cycling programme, which took place on 5 April 2018. The New Zealand team originally had the third fastest time in the qualifying round, but were disqualified after one of their bikes failed a technical inspection.

== Records ==
Prior to this competition, the existing world and Games records were as follows:

World record	Great Britain (Ed Clancy, Steven Burke, Owain Doull, Bradley Wiggins)	3:50.265	Rio de Janeiro, Brazil	12 August 2016
Games record	Australia (Jack Bobridge, Luke Davison, Alex Edmondson, Glenn O'Shea)	3:54.851	Glasgow, Scotland	24 July 2014

== Schedule ==
The schedule is as follows:

All times are Australian Eastern Standard Time (UTC+10)

Date	Time	Round
Thursday 5 April 2018	15:35	Qualifying
Thursday 5 April 2018	20:12 / 20:19	Finals

== Results ==
=== Qualifying ===
The two fastest teams advance to the gold medal final. The next two fastest teams advance to the bronze medal final.

Rank	Nation	Time	Behind	Notes
1	Australia; Leigh Howard; Jordan Kerby; Alex Porter; Sam Welsford	3:52.041	–	QG, GR
2	England; Kian Emadi; Ethan Hayter; Charlie Tanfield; Oliver Wood	3:55.399	+3.358	QG
3	Canada; Michael Foley; Derek Gee; Adam Jamieson; Jay Lamoureux	4:00.109	+8.068	QB
4	Wales; Rhys Britton; Samuel Harrison; Joe Holt; Ethan Vernon	4:01.489	+9.448	QB
5	South Africa; Gert Fouche; Nolan Hoffman; David Maree; Steven van Heerden	4:11.711	+19.670	
6	Malaysia; Muhammad Danie Al Edy Shuaidee; Irwandie Lakasek; Muhamad Afiq Huznie Othman; Muhammad Nur Aiman Rosli	4:13.033	+20.992	
–	New Zealand; Regan Gough; Nicholas Kergozou; Tom Sexton; Campbell Stewart	DSQ; ~~3:56.294~~	~~+4.253~~	

=== Finals ===
The final classification was determined in the medal finals.

Rank	Nation	Time	Behind	Notes
Bronze medal final
3rd place, bronze medalist(s)	Canada; Michael Foley; Jay Lamoureux; Derek Gee; Aidan Caves	4:00.440	–	
4	Wales; Joe Holt; Ethan Vernon; Samuel Harrison; Rhys Britton	4:01.362	+0.922	
Gold medal final
1st place, gold medalist(s)	Australia; Alex Porter; Sam Welsford; Leigh Howard; Kelland O'Brien	3:49.804	–	WR, GR
2nd place, silver medalist(s)	England; Oliver Wood; Kian Emadi; Charlie Tanfield; Ethan Hayter	3:55.310	+5.506	
