= 2019 UCI Track Cycling World Championships – Men's team pursuit =

Men's team pursuit at the 2019 UCI Track Cycling World Championships
- Venue: BGŻ Arena
- Location: Pruszków, Poland
- Dates: 27–28 February
- Competitors: 78 from 18 nations
- Teams: 18
- Winning time: 3:48.012

Medalists
gold medal	Sam Welsford; Kelland O'Brien; Leigh Howard; Alexander Porter; Cameron Scott	Australia
silver medal	Ethan Hayter; Ed Clancy; Kian Emadi; Charlie Tanfield; Oliver Wood	Great Britain
bronze medal	Niklas Larsen; Lasse Norman Hansen; Rasmus Pedersen; Casper von Folsach; Julius Johansen	Denmark

The Men's team pursuit competition at the 2019 UCI Track Cycling World Championships was held on 27 and 28 February 2019.

== Results ==
=== Qualifying ===
The qualifying was started on 27 February at 14:55. The eight fastest teams advanced to the first round.

Rank	Nation	Time	Behind	Notes
1	Australia; Sam Welsford; Kelland O'Brien; Leigh Howard; Cameron Scott	3:52.152		Q
2	Great Britain; Ethan Hayter; Ed Clancy; Kian Emadi; Oliver Wood	3:54.010	+1.858	Q
3	Denmark; Lasse Norman Hansen; Julius Johansen; Rasmus Pedersen; Casper von Folsach	3:54.141	+1.989	Q
4	New Zealand; Campbell Stewart; Thomas Sexton; Aaron Gate; Nicholas Kergozou	3:56.603	+4.451	Q
5	Canada; Derek Gee; Michael Foley; Adam Jamieson; Jay Lamoureux	3:56.914	+4.762	q
6	Germany; Felix Groß; Theo Reinhardt; Leon Rohde; Domenic Weinstein	3:57.276	+5.124	q
7	Switzerland; Claudio Imhof; Cyrille Thièry; Stefan Bissegger; Robin Froidevaux	3:57.834	+5.682	q
8	Poland; Szymon Sajnok; Adrian Kaiser; Szymon Krawczyk; Bartosz Rudyk	3:58.473	+6.321	q
9	Belgium; Lindsay De Vylder; Kenny De Ketele; Robbe Ghys; Fabio Van den Bossche	3:59.617	+7.465	
10	United States; Gavin Hoover; Ashton Lambie; Colby Lange; Eric Young	4:00.590	+7.724	
11	Italy; Liam Bertazzo; Filippo Ganna; Francesco Lamon; Davide Plebani	4:00.725	+8.438	
12	Japan; Ryo Chikatani; Shogo Ichimaru; Shunsuke Imamura; Keitaro Sawada	4:02.008	+9.856	
13	Belarus; Raman Tsishkou; Yauheni Akhramenka; Yauheni Karaliok; Mikhail Shemetau	4:02.303	+10.151	
14	Russia; Lev Gonov; Dmitry Mukhomediarov; Ivan Smirnov; Gleb Syritsa	4:02.363	+10.211	
15	South Korea; Park Sang-hoon; Im Jae-yeon; Min Kyeong-ho; Shin Don-gin	4:04.168	+12.016	
16	France; Benjamin Thomas; Florian Maitre; Bryan Coquard; Aurélien Costeplane	4:05.792	+13.640	
17	China; Chen Zhiwen; Guo Liang; Shen Pingan; Xu Zhaoliang	4:06.523	+14.371	
18	Ukraine; Vitaliy Hryniv; Roman Gladysh; Timur Malieiev; Vladyslav Shcherban	4:08.125	+15.973	

=== First round ===
The first round was started on 27 February at 20:27.

First round heats were held as follows:
Heat 1: 6th v 7th fastest
Heat 2: 5th v 8th fastest
Heat 3: 2nd v 3rd fastest
Heat 4: 1st v 4th fastest

The winners of heats three and four proceeded to the gold medal race. The remaining six teams were ranked on time, from which the top two proceeded to the bronze medal race.

Rank	Heat	Nation	Time	Behind	Notes
1	1	Germany; Felix Groß; Theo Reinhardt; Leon Rohde; Domenic Weinstein	3:56.897		
2	1	Switzerland; Claudio Imhof; Stefan Bissegger; Robin Froidevaux; Frank Pasche	3:59.108	+0.211	
1	2	Canada; Derek Gee; Michael Foley; Adam Jamieson; Jay Lamoureux	3:54.670		QB
2	2	Poland; Adrian Kaiser; Szymon Krawczyk; Bartosz Rudyk; Daniel Staniszewski	4:00.711	+6.041	
1	3	Great Britain; Ethan Hayter; Ed Clancy; Kian Emadi; Charlie Tanfield	3:51.635		QG
2	3	Denmark; Niklas Larsen; Lasse Norman Hansen; Rasmus Pedersen; Casper von Folsach	3:55.602	+3.977	QB
1	4	Australia; Sam Welsford; Kelland O'Brien; Leigh Howard; Alexander Porter	3:51.529		QG
2	4	New Zealand; Thomas Sexton; Aaron Gate; Nicholas Kergozou; Corbin Strong	4:05.861	+14.332	

- QG = qualified for gold medal final
- QB = qualified for bronze medal final

=== Finals ===
The finals were started at 19:23.

Rank	Nation	Time	Behind	Notes
Gold medal race
1st place, gold medalist(s)	Australia; Sam Welsford; Kelland O'Brien; Leigh Howard; Alexander Porter	3:48.012		WR
2nd place, silver medalist(s)	Great Britain; Ethan Hayter; Ed Clancy; Kian Emadi; Charlie Tanfield	3:50.810	+2.798	
Bronze medal race
3rd place, bronze medalist(s)	Denmark; Niklas Larsen; Lasse Norman Hansen; Rasmus Pedersen; Casper von Folsach	3:51.804		
4	Canada; Derek Gee; Michael Foley; Adam Jamieson; Jay Lamoureux	3:56.382	+4.578	
