= 2021 UEC European Track Championships – Men's team pursuit =

Men's team pursuit at the 2021 UEC European Track Championships
- Venue: Tissot Velodrome, Grenchen
- Date: 5–6 October
- Competitors: 37 from 9 nations
- Winning time: 3:51.382

Medalists
gold medal	Carl-Frederik Bévort; Tobias Hansen; Matias Malmberg; Rasmus Pedersen	Denmark
silver medal	Claudio Imhof; Valère Thiébaud; Simon Vitzthum; Alex Vogel	Switzerland
bronze medal	Rhys Britton; Charlie Tanfield; William Tidball; Oliver Wood	Great Britain

The men's team pursuit competition at the 2021 UEC European Track Championships was held on 5 and 6 October 2021.

== Results ==
=== Qualifying ===
The eight fastest teams advanced to the first round.

Rank	Nation	Time	Behind	Notes
1	Switzerland; Claudio Imhof; Valère Thiébaud; Simon Vitzthum; Alex Vogel	3:53.398		Q
2	Denmark; Carl-Frederik Bévort; Tobias Hansen; Matias Malmberg; Rasmus Pedersen	3:53.476	+0.078	Q
3	Italy; Liam Bertazzo; Francesco Lamon; Stefano Moro; Michele Scartezzini	3:54.197	+0.799	Q
4	Russia; Lev Gonov; Egor Igoshev; Ivan Novolodskii; Gleb Syritsa	3:54.429	+1.031	Q
5	Great Britain; Rhys Britton; Charlie Tanfield; William Tidball; Oliver Wood	3:55.127	+1.729	q
6	Germany; Tobias Buck-Gramcko; Felix Groß; Nicolas Heinrich; Theo Reinhardt	3:55.810	+2.412	q
7	Poland; Alan Banaszek; Szymon Krawczyk; Bartosz Rudyk; Daniel Staniszewski	3:57.569	+4.171	q
8	Belgium; Tuur Dens; Gianluca Pollefliet; Brent Van Mulders; Noah Vandenbranden	3:59.052	+5.654	q
9	Ukraine; Volodymyr Dzhus; Roman Gladysh; Vitaliy Hryniv; Maksym Vasilyev	4:03.908	+10.510	

=== First round ===
First round heats were held as follows:
Heat 1: 6th v 7th fastest
Heat 2: 5th v 8th fastest
Heat 3: 2nd v 3rd fastest
Heat 4: 1st v 4th fastest

The winners of heats 3 and 4 proceeded to the gold medal race. The remaining six teams were ranked on time, from which the top two proceeded to the bronze medal race.

Heat	Rank	Nation	Time	Notes
1	1	Germany; Tobias Buck-Gramcko; Felix Groß; Nicolas Heinrich; Theo Reinhardt	3:52.043	QB
1	2	Poland; Alan Banaszek; Szymon Krawczyk; Bartosz Rudyk; Daniel Staniszewski	3:57.780	
2	1	Great Britain; Rhys Britton; Charlie Tanfield; William Tidball; Oliver Wood	3:51.497	QB
2	2	Belgium; Tuur Dens; Gianluca Pollefliet; Brent Van Mulders; Noah Vandenbranden	3:58.781	
3	1	Denmark; Carl-Frederik Bévort; Tobias Hansen; Matias Malmberg; Rasmus Pedersen	3:52.062	QG
3	2	Italy; Liam Bertazzo; Francesco Lamon; Jonathan Milan; Michele Scartezzini	3:52.199	
4	1	Switzerland; Claudio Imhof; Valère Thiébaud; Simon Vitzthum; Alex Vogel		QG
4	2	Russia; Lev Gonov; Egor Igoshev; Ivan Novolodskii; Gleb Syritsa	4:05.557	

=== Finals ===
Rank	Nation	Time	Behind	Notes
Gold medal final
1st place, gold medalist(s)	Denmark; Carl-Frederik Bévort; Tobias Hansen; Matias Malmberg; Rasmus Pedersen	3:51.382		
2nd place, silver medalist(s)	Switzerland; Claudio Imhof; Valère Thiébaud; Simon Vitzthum; Alex Vogel	3:52.646	+1.264	
Bronze medal final
3rd place, bronze medalist(s)	Great Britain; Rhys Britton; Charlie Tanfield; William Tidball; Oliver Wood	3:55.595		
4	Germany; Tobias Buck-Gramcko; Felix Groß; Nicolas Heinrich; Theo Reinhardt	3:55.617	+0.022	
