= 2024 UEC European Track Championships – Men's individual pursuit =

Men's individual pursuit at the 2024 UEC European Track Championships
- Venue: Omnisport Apeldoorn, Apeldoorn
- Date: 12 January
- Competitors: 22 from 13 nations
- Winning time: 4:05.783

Medalists
gold medal	Daniel Bigham	Great Britain
silver medal	Charlie Tanfield	Great Britain
bronze medal	Rasmus Pedersen	Denmark

The men's individual pursuit competition at the 2024 UEC European Track Championships was held on 12 January 2024.

== Results ==
=== Qualifying ===
The first two racers raced for gold, the third and fourth fastest rider raced for the bronze medal.

Rank	Name	Nation	Time	Behind	Notes
1	Daniel Bigham	Great Britain	4:05.490		QG
2	Charlie Tanfield	Great Britain	4:05.563	+0.073	QG
3	Rasmus Pedersen	Denmark	4:06.504	+1.014	QB
4	Tobias Buck-Gramcko	Germany	4:07.715	+2.225	QB
5	Carl-Frederik Bévort	Denmark	4:09.711	+4.221	
6	Valère Thiébaud	Switzerland	4:13.950	+8.460	
7	Thomas Denis	France	4:14.041	+9.551	
8	Iver Knotten	Norway	4:16.251	+10.761	
9	Corentin Ermenault	France	4:16.388	+10.898	
10	Milan Van den Haute	Belgium	4:16.802	+11.312	
11	Niccolò Galli	Italy	4:16.940	+11.450	
12	Luca Giaimi	Italy	4:17.379	+11.889	
13	Adam Woźniak	Poland	4:17.628	+12.138	
14	Noah Vandenbranden	Belgium	4:19.535	+14.045	
15	Rodrigo Caixas	Portugal	4:22.735	+17.245	
16	Noah Bögli	Switzerland	4:23.562	+18.072	
17	Erik Martorell	Spain	4:24.830	+19.340	
18	Joan Martí Bennassar	Spain	4:26.919	+21.429	
19	Vitaliy Hryniv	Ukraine	4:27.346	+21.856	
20	Heorhii Antonenko	Ukraine	4:31.565	+26.075	
21	Vitālijs Korņilovs	Latvia	4:37.424	+31.934	
—	Nicolas Heinrich	Germany	Disqualified		

=== Finals ===
Rank	Name	Nation	Time	Behind	Notes
Gold medal final
1st place, gold medalist(s)	Daniel Bigham	Great Britain	4:05.783		
2nd place, silver medalist(s)	Charlie Tanfield	Great Britain	4:07.777	+1.994	
Bronze medal final
3rd place, bronze medalist(s)	Rasmus Pedersen	Denmark	4:10.119		
4	Tobias Buck-Gramcko	Germany	4:10.802	+0.683	
