= 2016 UCI Junior Track Cycling World Championships =

- Venue: (Switzerland) World Cycling Centre in Aigle
- Date: 20–24 July 2016

The 2016 UCI Junior Track Cycling World Championships were the 42nd annual Junior World Championships for track cycling, held at the World Cycling Centre in Aigle, Switzerland from 20 to 24 July.

The Championships had ten events for men (sprint, points race, individual pursuit, team pursuit, 1 kilometre time trial, team sprint, keirin, madison, scratch race, omnium) and nine for women (sprint, individual pursuit, 500 metre time trial, points race, keirin, scratch race, team sprint, team pursuit, omnium), and one demonstration event for women (madison).

== Medal summary ==
| Event | Gold | Silver | Bronze |
|---|---|---|---|
Men's Events
| Sprint | Bradly Knipe; New Zealand | Conor Rowley; Australia | Stefan Ritter; Canada |
| Points race | Szymon Krawczyk; Poland | Matthew Walls; Great Britain | Li Wen Chao; Chinese Taipei |
| Individual pursuit | Stefan Bissegger; Switzerland | Rasmus Pedersen; Denmark | Bastian Flicke; Germany |
| Team pursuit | Campbell Stewart; Jared Gray; Thomas Sexton; Connor Brown; New Zealand | Rasmus Pedersen; Mathias Larsen; Julius Johansen; Kristian Eriksen; Denmark | Matthew Walls; Reece Wood; Ethan Hayter; Rhys Britton; Great Britain |
| Time trial | Stefan Ritter; Canada | Bradly Knipe; New Zealand | Na Junggyu; South Korea |
| Team sprint | Mikhail Dmitriev; Pavel Rostov; Dmitry Nesterov; Russia | Cameron Scott; Conor Rowley; Harrison Lodge; Australia | Nik Schröter; Felix Zschocke; Carl Hinze; Germany |
| Keirin | Conor Rowley; Australia | Martin Čechman; Czech Republic | David Orgambide; Spain |
| Madison | Marc Hirschi; Reto Müller; Switzerland | Campbell Stewart; Thomas Sexton; New Zealand | Kelland O'Brien; Cameron Scott; Australia |
| Scratch race | Tegshbayar Batsaikhan; Mongolia | Daniel Babor; Czech Republic | Moreno Marchetti; Italy |
| Omnium | Campbell Stewart; New Zealand | Tomás Contte; Argentina | Julius Johansen; Denmark |

| Event | Gold | Silver | Bronze |
|---|---|---|---|
Women's Events
| Sprint | Pauline Grabosch; Germany | Guo Yufang; China | Hetty van de Wouw; Netherlands |
| Individual pursuit | Maria Novolodskaya; Russia | Jade Haines; Australia | Ellesse Andrews; New Zealand |
| Time trial | Pauline Grabosch; Germany | Guo Yufang; China | Kim Soohyun; South Korea |
| Points race | Letizia Paternoster; Italy | Jessica Roberts; Great Britain | Wiktoria Pikulik; Poland |
| Keirin | Sára Kaňkovská; Czech Republic | Gloria Manzoni; Italy | Guo Yufang; China |
| Scratch race | Rebecca Raybould; Great Britain | Devaney Collier; Canada | Kristina Clonan; Australia |
| Team sprint | Emma Cumming; Ellesse Andrews; New Zealand | Gloria Manzoni; Martina Fidanza; Italy | Guo Yufang; Shen Chaoyue; China |
| Team pursuit | Elisa Balsamo; Martina Stefani; Chiara Consonni; Letizia Paternoster; Italy | Michaela Drummond; Emily Shearman; Kate Smith; Nicole Shields; New Zealand | Pauline Clouard; Typhaine Laurance; Clara Copponi; Valentine Fortin; France |
| Omnium | Elisa Balsamo; Italy | Michaela Drummond; New Zealand | Maggie Coles-Lyster; Canada |
| Madison | Jade Haines; Ruby Roseman-Gannon; Australia | Lauren Dolan; Jenny Holl; Great Britain | Nicola MacDonald; Kristina Clonan; Australia |

== Medal table ==
* Host nation (Switzerland)

| Rank | Nation | Gold | Silver | Bronze | Total |
|---|---|---|---|---|---|
| 1 | New Zealand (NZL) | 4 | 4 | 1 | 9 |
| 2 | Italy (ITA) | 3 | 2 | 1 | 6 |
| 3 | Germany (GER) | 2 | 0 | 2 | 4 |
| 4 | Russia (RUS) | 2 | 0 | 0 | 2 |
| 4 | Switzerland (SUI)* | 2 | 0 | 0 | 2 |
| 6 | Australia (AUS) | 1 | 3 | 2 | 6 |
| 7 | Great Britain (GBR) | 1 | 2 | 1 | 4 |
| 8 | Czech Republic (CZE) | 1 | 2 | 0 | 3 |
| 9 | Canada (CAN) | 1 | 1 | 2 | 4 |
| 10 | Poland (POL) | 1 | 0 | 1 | 2 |
| 11 | Mongolia (MGL) | 1 | 0 | 0 | 1 |
| 12 | China (CHN) | 0 | 2 | 2 | 4 |
| 13 | Denmark (DEN) | 0 | 2 | 1 | 3 |
| 14 | Argentina (ARG) | 0 | 1 | 0 | 1 |
| 15 | South Korea (KOR) | 0 | 0 | 2 | 2 |
| 16 | Chinese Taipei (TPE) | 0 | 0 | 1 | 1 |
| 16 | France (FRA) | 0 | 0 | 1 | 1 |
| 16 | Netherlands (NED) | 0 | 0 | 1 | 1 |
| 16 | Spain (ESP) | 0 | 0 | 1 | 1 |
| Totals (19 entries) | | 19 | 19 | 19 | 57 |
