= 2014 UEC European Track Championships – Men's scratch =

Men's scratch race at the 2014 UEC European Track Championships
- UEC European Champion jersey
- Venue: Vélodrome Amédée Détraux, Baie-Mahault
- Date: 16 October
- Competitors: 31 from 17 nations

Medalists
| gold medal | Otto Vergaerde | Belgium |
| silver medal | Eloy Teruel | Spain |
| bronze medal | Ed Clancy | Great Britain |

The Men's scratch was held on 16 October 2014.

== Results ==
| Rank | Name | Nation | Laps down |
|---|---|---|---|
| 1st place, gold medalist(s) | Otto Vergaerde | Belgium | |
| 2nd place, silver medalist(s) | Eloy Teruel | Spain | |
| 3rd place, bronze medalist(s) | Ed Clancy | Great Britain | -1 |
| 4 | Alex Buttazzoni | Italy | -1 |
| 5 | Tristan Marguet | Switzerland | -1 |
| 6 | Andreas Müller | Austria | -1 |
| 7 | Adrian Tekliński | Poland | -1 |
| 8 | Morgan Kneisky | France | -1 |
| 9 | František Sisr | Czech Republic | -1 |
| 10 | Maksym Vasyliev | Ukraine | -1 |
| 11 | Theo Bos | Netherlands | -1 |
| 12 | Ioannis Spanopoulos | Greece | -1 |
| 13 | Mateusz Nowak | Poland | -1 |
| 14 | Hardzei Tsishchanka | Belarus | -1 |
| 15 | Ahmet Örken | Turkey | -1 |
| 16 | Andreas Graf | Austria | -1 |
| 17 | Javan Nulty | Ireland | -1 |
| 18 | Benjamin Thomas | France | -1 |
| 19 | Kersten Thiele | Germany | -1 |
| 20 | Roman Shevchuk | Ukraine | -1 |
| 21 | Mark Christian | Great Britain | -1 |
| 22 | Roy Eefting | Netherlands | -1 |
| 23 | Ivan Kovalev | Russia | -1 |
| 24 | Michele Scartezzini | Italy | -1 |
| 25 | Aleh Ahiyevich | Belarus | -1 |
| 26 | Moreno De Pauw | Belgium | -1 |
| 27 | Alexey Kurbatov | Russia | -1 |
| 28 | Martyn Irvine | Ireland | -1 |
| 29 | Leon Rohde | Germany | -1 |
| 30 | Frank Pasche | Switzerland | -1 |
| — | Albert Torres | Spain | DNF |
