= Frederik Rodenberg =

Danish cyclist (born 1998)

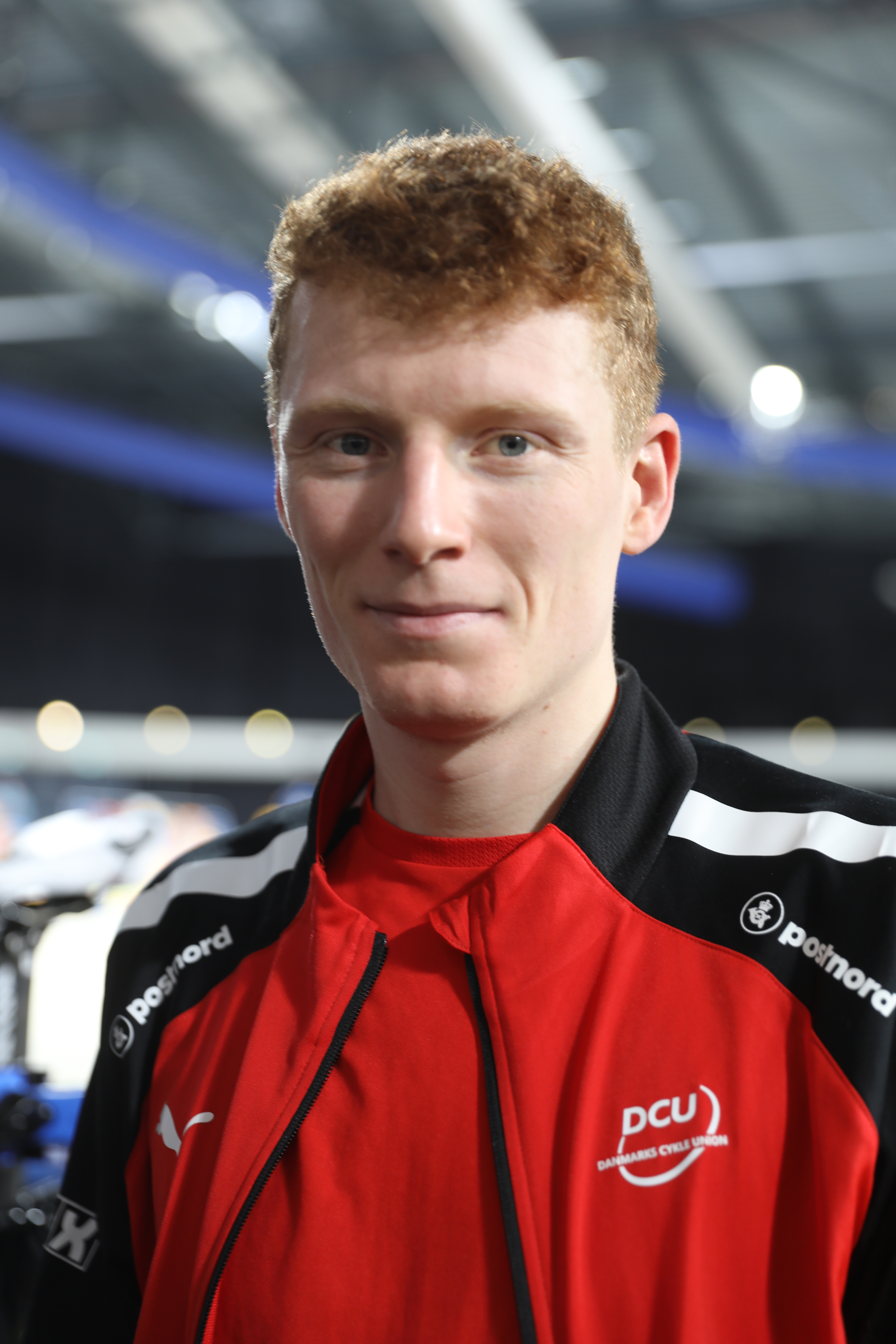
- Rodenberg in 2024

Personal information
- Full name: Frederik Rodenberg Madsen
- Born: 22 January 1998 (age 28) Værløse, Denmark
- Height: 1.87 m (6 ft 2 in)
- Weight: 73 kg (161 lb)

Cycling career
- Sport: Cycling
- Current team: Team CO:PLAY–Giant Store
- Disciplines: Track; Road
- Role: Rider

Amateur team
- 2024–: Team CO:PLAY–Giant Store

Professional teams
- 2017: Team Giant–Castelli
- 2018–2019: Team ColoQuick
- 2020–2021: Uno-X Norwegian Development Team
- 2022–2023: Team DSM

Major wins
- Track World Championships Team pursuit (2020, 2023, 2024, 2025, 2026)
Medal record
Men's track cycling
Representing Denmark
Olympic Games
| Silver medal – second place | 2020 Tokyo | Team pursuit |
| Bronze medal – third place | 2016 Rio de Janeiro | Team pursuit |
World Championships
| Gold medal – first place | 2020 Berlin | Team pursuit |
| Gold medal – first place | 2023 Glasgow | Team pursuit |
| Gold medal – first place | 2024 Ballerup | Team pursuit |
| Gold medal – first place | 2025 Santiago | Team pursuit |
| Gold medal – first place | 2026 Shanghai | Team pursuit |
| Silver medal – second place | 2018 Apeldoorn | Team pursuit |
| Silver medal – second place | 2026 Shanghai | Individual pursuit |
| Bronze medal – third place | 2016 London | Team pursuit |
European Championships
| Gold medal – first place | 2019 Apeldoorn | Team pursuit |
| Gold medal – first place | 2026 Konya | Team pursuit |
| Silver medal – second place | 2024 Apeldoorn | Team pursuit |

Frederik Rodenberg Madsen (born 22 January 1998) is a Danish professional road and track cyclist, who currently rides for club team Team CO:PLAY–Giant Store. He rode in the men's team pursuit at the 2016 UCI Track Cycling World Championships winning a bronze medal.

== Major results ==
=== Road ===
2015
3rd Road race, National Junior Championships
2016
National Junior Championships

1st Road race
2nd Time trial

1st Stage 2a (ITT) Keizer der Juniores
2017
4th Overall Paris–Arras Tour

1st Stage 2

2019
1st Road race, National Under-23 Championships
1st Skive–Løbet
1st Eschborn–Frankfurt Under-23
2020
1st Stage 2 Bałtyk–Karkonosze Tour
7th Paris–Tours Espoirs

=== Track ===
2015
2nd Team pursuit, UEC European Championships
2016
1st Madison, National Championships (with Casper von Folsach)
3rd Team pursuit, Olympic Games
3rd Team pursuit, UCI World Championships
2017
1st Team pursuit, UCI World Cup, Cali
2018
2nd Team pursuit, UCI World Championships
2019
1st Team pursuit, UEC European Championships
UCI World Cup

1st Team pursuit, Glasgow
1st Team pursuit, Minsk

2020
1st Team pursuit, UCI World Championships
2021
2nd Team pursuit, Olympic Games
2023
1st Team pursuit, UCI World Championships
2024
1st Team pursuit, UCI World Championships
2nd Team pursuit, UEC European Championships
2025
1st Team pursuit, UCI World Championships
2026
UCI World Championships

1st Team pursuit
2nd Individual pursuit
