= 2018 UCI Track Cycling World Championships – Men's team pursuit =

Men's team pursuit at the 2018 UCI Track Cycling World Championships
- Venue: Omnisport Apeldoorn
- Location: Apeldoorn, Netherlands
- Dates: 28 February 2018–1 March 2018
- Competitors: 64 from 16 nations
- Teams: 16
- Winning time: 3:53.389

Medalists
gold medal	Ed Clancy; Kian Emadi; Ethan Hayter; Charlie Tanfield	Great Britain
silver medal	Niklas Larsen; Julius Johansen; Frederik Madsen; Casper von Folsach	Denmark
bronze medal	Simone Consonni; Liam Bertazzo; Filippo Ganna; Francesco Lamon	Italy

The Men's team pursuit competition at the 2018 UCI Track Cycling World Championships was held on 28 February and 1 March 2018 at the Omnisport Apeldoorn in Apeldoorn, Netherlands.

== Results ==
=== Qualifying ===
The eight fastest teams advance to the first round.

Rank	Nation	Time	Behind	Notes
1	Great Britain; Ed Clancy; Kian Emadi; Ethan Hayter; Charlie Tanfield	3:55.714		Q
2	Italy; Simone Consonni; Liam Bertazzo; Filippo Ganna; Francesco Lamon	3:56.406	+0.692	Q
3	Denmark; Niklas Larsen; Julius Johansen; Frederik Madsen; Casper von Folsach	3:56.740	+1.026	Q
4	Germany; Maximilian Beyer; Felix Groß; Theo Reinhardt; Kersten Thiele	3:57.447	+1.733	Q
5	New Zealand; Campbell Stewart; Regan Gough; Dylan Kennett; Nicholas Kergozou	3:57.622	+1.908	q
6	Russia; Mamyr Stash; Alexander Evtushenko; Ivan Smirnov; Kirill Sveshnikov	3:59.362	+3.648	q
7	Switzerland; Claudio Imhof; Cyrille Thièry; Frank Pasche; Valère Thiébaud	3:59.543	+3.829	q
8	Canada; Michael Foley; Derek Gee; Adam Jamieson; Jay Lamoureux	4:00.584	+4.870	q
9	Japan; Ryo Chikatani; Shogo Ichimaru; Shunsuke Imamura; Keitaro Sawada	4:01.753	+6.039	
10	Poland; Szymon Sajnok; Alan Banaszek; Szymon Krawczyk; Adrian Tekliński	4:01.963	+6.249	
11	France; Benjamin Thomas; Adrien Garel; Florian Maitre; Louis Pijourlet	4:02.415	+6.701	
12	Belgium; Lindsay De Vylder; Kenny De Ketele; Moreno De Pauw; Robbe Ghys	4:03.367	+7.653	
13	United States; Eric Young; Gavin Hoover; Ashton Lambie; Daniel Summerhill	4:04.203	+8.489	
14	Belarus; Raman Tsishkou; Yauheni Akhramenka; Yauheni Karaliok; Mikhail Shemetau	4:06.629	+10.915	
15	China; Hou Ya Ke; Jiang Zhihui; Shen Pingan; Wang Fengnian	4:08.266	+12.552	
16	Spain; Eloy Teruel; Xavier Cañellas; Vicente García de Mateos; Illart Zuazubiskar	4:10.677	+14.963	

=== First round ===
First round heats were held as follows:
Heat 1: 6th v 7th fastest
Heat 2: 5th v 8th fastest
Heat 3: 2nd v 3rd fastest
Heat 4: 1st v 4th fastest

The winners of heats 3 and 4 proceeded to the gold medal race. The remaining six teams were ranked on time, from which the top two proceeded to the bronze medal race.

Rank	Heat	Nation	Time	Notes
1	3	Denmark; Niklas Larsen; Julius Johansen; Frederik Madsen; Casper von Folsach	3:54.496	QG
2	3	Italy; Simone Consonni; Liam Bertazzo; Filippo Ganna; Francesco Lamon	3:54.884	QB
3	4	Great Britain; Ed Clancy; Kian Emadi; Ethan Hayter; Charlie Tanfield	3:56.335	QG
4	4	Germany; Maximilian Beyer; Felix Groß; Theo Reinhardt; Kersten Thiele	3:58.047	QB
5	2	New Zealand; Campbell Stewart; Regan Gough; Dylan Kennett; Nicholas Kergozou	3:58.932	
6	1	Switzerland; Claudio Imhof; Cyrille Thièry; Gaël Suter; Valère Thiébaud	3:59.648	
7	1	Russia; Lev Gonov; Alexander Evtushenko; Ivan Smirnov; Sergei Shilov	4:00.320	
8	2	Canada; Michael Foley; Derek Gee; Adam Jamieson; Jay Lamoureux	4:02.235	

- QG = qualified for gold medal final
- QB = qualified for bronze medal final

=== Finals ===
The final was held at 19:23.

Rank	Nation	Time	Behind	Notes
Gold medal final
1st place, gold medalist(s)	Great Britain; Ed Clancy; Kian Emadi; Ethan Hayter; Charlie Tanfield	3:53.389		
2nd place, silver medalist(s)	Denmark; Niklas Larsen; Julius Johansen; Frederik Madsen; Casper von Folsach	3:55.232	+1.843	
Bronze medal final
3rd place, bronze medalist(s)	Italy; Simone Consonni; Liam Bertazzo; Filippo Ganna; Francesco Lamon	3:54.606		
4	Germany; Nils Schomber; Felix Groß; Theo Reinhardt; Kersten Thiele	3:56.594	1.988	
