= Kian Emadi =

British cyclist (born 1992)

Kian Emadi-Coffin
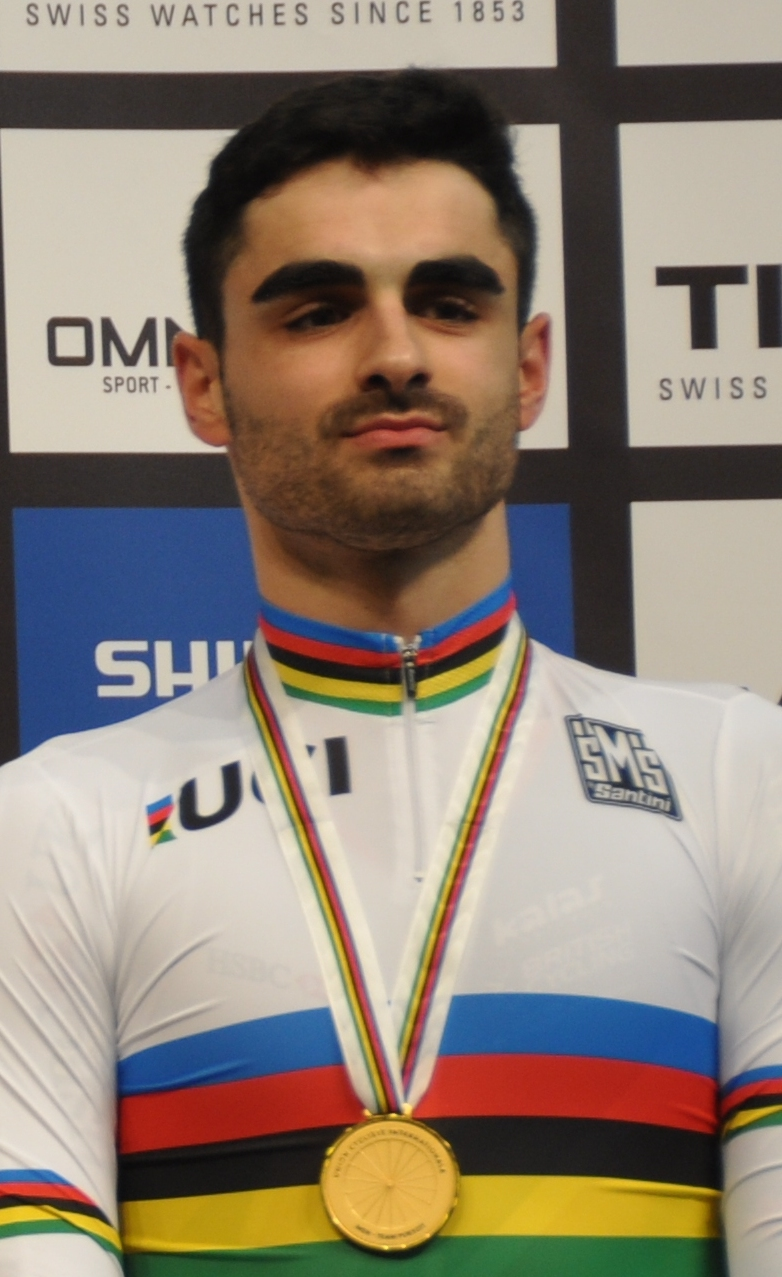
- Emadi at the 2018 Track Cycling World Championships

Personal information
- Born: 29 July 1992 (age 34) Stoke-on-Trent, England
- Height: 1.60 m (5 ft 3 in)
- Weight: 84 kg (185 lb)

Cycling career
- Sport: Cycling
- Discipline: Track cycling
- Role: Rider
- Rider type: Endurance; Sprinter (formerly)

Professional team
- 2012–present: Sky Track Cycling

Major wins
- Track World Championships Team pursuit (2018)
Medal record
Men's track cycling
Representing Great Britain
World Championships
Gold medal – first place	2018 Apeldoorn	Team pursuit
Silver medal – second place	2019 Pruszków	Team pursuit
Bronze medal – third place	2021 Roubaix	Team pursuit
European Championships
Bronze medal – third place	2016 Yvelines	Team pursuit
Bronze medal – third place	2018 Glasgow	Team pursuit
Bronze medal – third place	2022 Munich	Team pursuit
Representing England
Commonwealth Games
Silver medal – second place	2014 Glasgow	Team sprint
Silver medal – second place	2018 Gold Coast	Team pursuit

Kian Emadi-Coffin (born 29 July 1992) is a former British track cyclist. He has represented Great Britain and England at international level, and is a three-time British National Track champion. Originally a sprinter, he transferred following injury to the endurance squad, and in 2018 won a gold medal as part of the team pursuit squad for Great Britain at the 2018 UCI Track Cycling World Championships.

== Career ==
Born and raised in Stoke-on-Trent, Emadi-Coffin started cycling competitively at the age of 13, and raced in many disciplines (track, road and cyclo-cross), before concentrating on the sprint disciplines of track racing. Emadi moved to Manchester at the age of 18 as a member of the British Cycling Podium Programme.

He represented Great Britain at the 2013 UCI Track Cycling World Championships and England at the 2014 Commonwealth Games. He won his first senior medal, a silver in the team sprint, at the latter event.

After suffering a back injury in September 2014, which limited the amount of gym work he could do to attempt to secure a place in the British team sprint squad for the 2016 Summer Olympics, Emadi-Coffin switched to the endurance squad.

In December 2022, following the recurrence of a back injury, Emadi-Coffin stepped away from the British team, and retired as a professional cyclist shortly afterwards.

== Personal life ==
Emadi-Coffin, born to an American academic mother and an Iranian father, attended St Peter's Church of England High School and then moved to St Joseph's College Sixth Form in Stoke to study for A-levels.

== Major results ==
=== Track ===
2009
National Junior Championships

1st Sprint
1st Kilo
3rd Keirin

Apeldoorn Interland

1st Team sprint
2nd Sprint
2nd Elimination
3rd Keirin

2010
National Junior Championships

1st Kilo
1st Keirin
2nd Sprint

2011
3rd Team sprint, National Championships
Revolution 33 – 2nd Sprint, Revolution Series
2012
1st Kilo, National Championships
2nd Kilo, UCI World Cup, Cali
2nd Sprint omnium, Six Days of Bremen
2013
National Championships

1st Kilo
1st Team sprint

1st Team sprint, Cottbuser Nächte
UCI World Cup

2nd Team sprint, Aguascalientes
3rd Team sprint, Manchester

Dutch Summer Trophy, Alkmaar

2nd Kilo
3rd Sprint

2014
2nd Team sprint, Commonwealth Games
2016
UCI World Cup

1st Team pursuit, Glasgow
3rd Team pursuit, Hong Kong

3rd Team pursuit, UEC European Championships
2017
1st Team pursuit, UCI World Cup, Manchester
2018
1st Team pursuit, UCI World Championships
2nd Team pursuit, Commonwealth Games
2019
2nd Team pursuit, UCI World Championships
2021
3rd Team pursuit, UCI World Championships
