= Matias Malmberg =

Danish cyclist (born 2000)

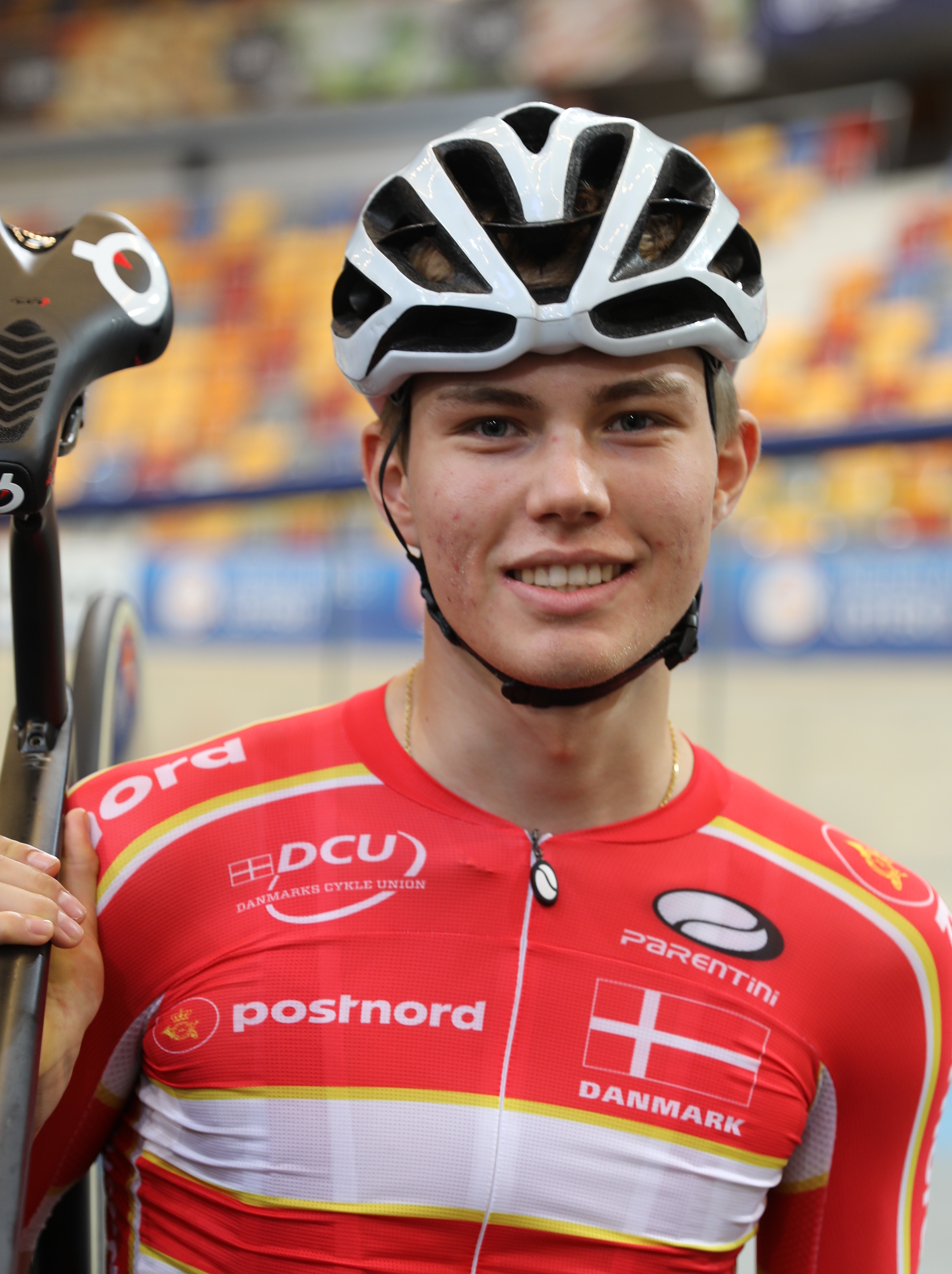
- Matias Malmberg (2019)

Personal information
- Full name: Matias Gunnar Malmberg
- Born: 31 August 2000 (age 26) Frederiksberg, Denmark
- Height: 1.77 m (5 ft 10 in)
- Weight: 68 kg (150 lb)

Cycling career
- Sport: Cycling
- Current team: Swatt Club
- Disciplines: Track, road
- Role: Rider

Amateur teams
- 2019–2021: IBT–Ridley Sydkisten
- 2026: DBC Ballerup

Professional teams
- 2022: Team ColoQuick
- 2023–2024: Maloja Pushbikers
- 2025: Airtox–Carl Ras
- 2026–: Swatt Club
Medal record
Representing Denmark
Men's track cycling
European Championships
Gold medal – first place	2021 Grenchen	Team pursuit
Bronze medal – third place	2021 Grenchen	Omnium

Matias Gunnar Malmberg (born 31 August 2000) is a Danish road and track cyclist, who currently rides for UCI Continental team Swatt Club.

He won the team pursuit at the 2021 UEC European Track Championships.

== Major results ==
=== Track ===
2016
1st Team pursuit, National Championships
2018
3rd Madison (with Oliver Frederiksen), UCI Junior World Championships
3rd Omnium, National Track Championships
2019
National Championships

1st Madison (with Lasse Norman Hansen)
2nd Omnium

2020
1st Omnium, National Championships
2021
UEC European Championships

1st Team pursuit
3rd Omnium

1st Omnium, UEC European Under-23 Championships
1st Madison (with Rasmus Pedersen), National Championships
2024
National Championships

1st Scratch
1st Elimination
1st Points race
3rd Individual pursuit

=== Road ===
2022
1st Time trial, National Under-23 Championships
1st Stage 1 (TTT) Kreiz Breizh Elites
7th Overall Flanders Tomorrow Tour

1st Stage 3a (ITT)

2023
2nd Overall Tour of Estonia
8th Fyen Rundt
10th GP Slovenian Istria
2024
9th Overall Dookoła Mazowsza
2025
1st Colne Grand Prix
10th Overall Olympia's Tour
2026 (1 pro win)
1st Stage 1a Sibiu Cycling Tour
1st Stage 5 Olympia's Tour
