= Rasmus Pedersen =

Danish cyclist (born 1998)

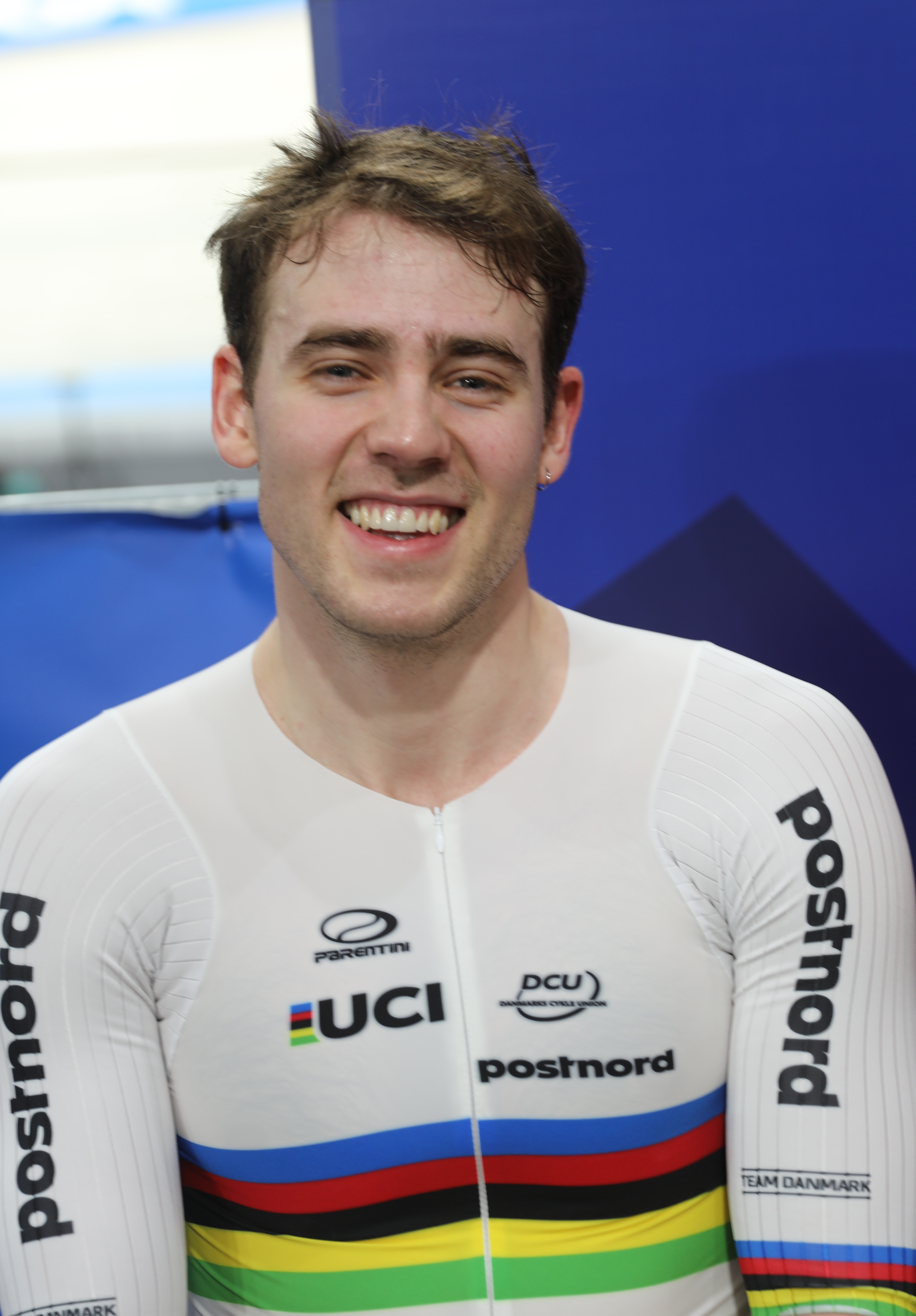
- Pedersen in 2024

Personal information
- Full name: Rasmus Lund Pedersen
- Born: 9 July 1998 (age 28) Odense, Denmark
- Height: 1.83 m (6 ft 0 in)
- Weight: 84 kg (185 lb)

Cycling career
- Sport: Cycling
- Current team: Airtox–Carl Ras
- Disciplines: Road; Track
- Role: Rider

Professional teams
- 2019–2020: Team ColoQuick
- 2021–: Restaurant Suri–Carl Ras

Major wins
- Track World Championships Team pursuit (2020, 2023, 2024, 2025, 2026)
Medal record
Representing Denmark
Men's track cycling
Olympic Games
Silver medal – second place	2020 Tokyo	Team pursuit
World Championships
Gold medal – first place	2020 Berlin	Team pursuit
Gold medal – first place	2023 Glasgow	Team pursuit
Gold medal – first place	2024 Ballerup	Team pursuit
Gold medal – first place	2025 Santiago	Team pursuit
Gold medal – first place	2026 Shanghai	Team pursuit
Silver medal – second place	2025 Santiago	Individual pursuit
Bronze medal – third place	2019 Pruszków	Team pursuit
Bronze medal – third place	2022 Saint-Quentin-en-Yvelines	Team pursuit
European Championships
Gold medal – first place	2019 Apeldoorn	Team pursuit
Gold medal – first place	2021 Grenchen	Team pursuit
Gold medal – first place	2026 Konya	Team pursuit
Silver medal – second place	2022 Munich	Team pursuit
Silver medal – second place	2024 Apeldoorn	Team pursuit
Bronze medal – third place	2024 Apeldoorn	Individual pursuit
Men's road bicycle racing
World Championships
Bronze medal – third place	2015 Richmond	Junior road race

Rasmus Lund Pedersen (born 9 July 1998) is a Danish road and track cyclist, who currently rides for UCI Continental team Airtox–Carl Ras. He competed at the 2019 UCI Track Cycling World Championships, winning a bronze medal.

== Major results ==
=== Road ===
2015
1st Road race, National Junior Championships
3rd Road race, UCI World Junior Championships
8th Overall Trophée Centre Morbihan
10th Overall Course de la Paix Juniors

1st Stage 4

2016
3rd Road race, National Junior Championships
5th Overall Course de la Paix Juniors

1st Stage 1

5th Overall Trophée Centre Morbihan

1st Stage 3

=== Track ===
2015
2nd Team pursuit, UEC European Junior Championships
2nd Team pursuit, UCI World Cup, Hong Kong
2016
2nd Individual pursuit, UCI World Junior Championships
2018
UCI World Cup

1st Team pursuit, Saint-Quentin-en-Yvelines
1st Team pursuit, Milton
2nd Team pursuit, Berlin

2019
1st Team pursuit, UEC European Championships
UCI World Cup

1st Team pursuit, Glasgow
1st Team pursuit, Minsk

3rd Team pursuit, UCI World Championships
2020
1st Team pursuit, UCI World Championships
2021
1st Team pursuit, UEC European Championships
1st Madison, National Championships (with Matias Malmberg)
2nd Team pursuit, Olympic Games
2022
2nd Team pursuit, UEC European Championships
3rd Team pursuit, UCI World Championships
3rd Team pursuit, UCI Nations Cup, Glasgow
2023
1st Team pursuit, UCI World Championships
2024
1st Team pursuit, UCI World Championships
UEC European Championships

2nd Team pursuit
3rd Individual pursuit

2025
UCI World Championships

1st Team pursuit
2nd Individual pursuit

2026
1st Team pursuit, UCI World Championships
