= Alexander Porter (cyclist) =

Australian cyclist

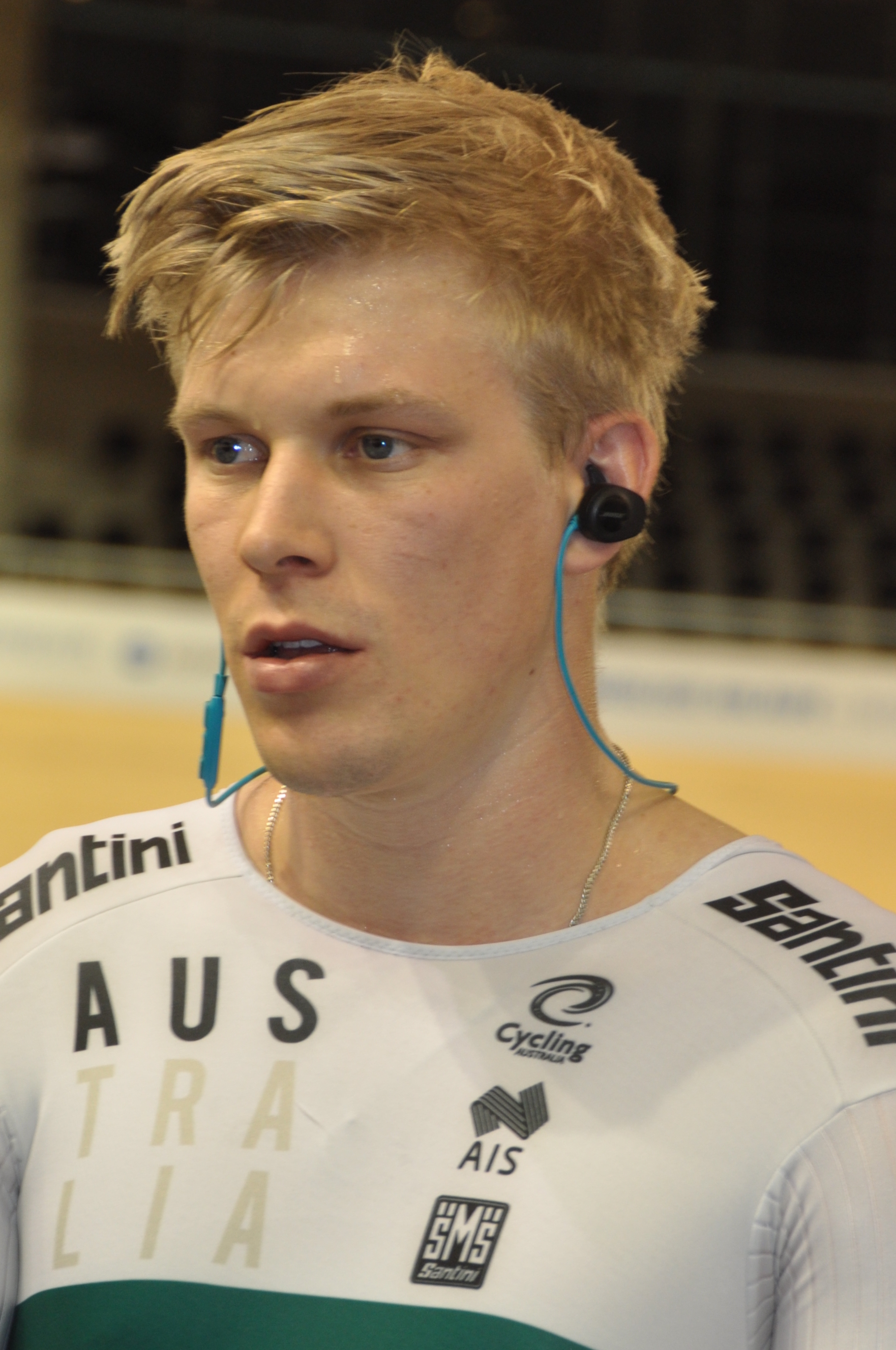
- Porter in 2018

Personal information
- Born: 13 May 1996 (age 30) Adelaide, Australia
- Height: 1.81 m (5 ft 11 in)
- Weight: 72 kg (159 lb)

Cycling career
- Sport: Cycling
- Current team: Bennelong SwissWellness Cycling Team
- Disciplines: Track, road
- Role: Rider

Amateur teams
- 2016: ILLI-Bikes Cycling Team
- 2017: Mitchelton Scott
- 2020: Lexus of Blackburn
- 2020: Scotch College South Australia CC

Professional teams
- 2018: Bennelong SwissWellness Cycling Team
- 2019: Pro Racing Sunshine Coast
Medal record
Representing Australia
Men's track cycling
Olympic Games
Bronze medal – third place	2020 Tokyo	Team pursuit
World Championships
Gold medal – first place	2016 London	Team pursuit
Gold medal – first place	2017 Hong Kong	Team pursuit
Gold medal – first place	2019 Pruszków	Team pursuit
Commonwealth Games
Gold medal – first place	2018 Gold Coast	Team pursuit

Alexander Porter (born 13 May 1996) is an Australian professional racing cyclist. Porter qualified for the Tokyo 2020 Olympics and was part of the Men's team pursuit together with Kelland O'Brien, Sam Weisford and Leigh Howard. They secured a bronze medal after overlapping New Zealand who had crashed. Porter also competed in the Men's Madison where the team finished fifth with a time of 3:48.448 and therefore did not qualify for the final.

Porter rode in the men's team pursuit at the 2016 UCI Track Cycling World Championships winning a gold medal.

== Major results ==
=== Track ===
2014
1st Team pursuit, UCI Junior Track World Championships
Oceania Junior Track Championships

1st Scratch race
2nd Omnium

2nd Scratch race, Oceania Track Championships
2015
1st Team pursuit, National Track Championships
UCI Track World Cup

1st Team pursuit, Hong Kong
3rd Team pursuit, Cali

2016
1st Team pursuit, UCI Track World Championships
Oceania Track Championships

1st Scratch race
1st Team pursuit

1st Team pursuit, National Track Championships
2017
1st Team pursuit, UCI Track World Championships
2018
1st Team pursuit, Commonwealth Games
UCI Track World Cup

1st Team pursuit, Berlin

Oceania Track Championships

1st Madison
2nd Points race

2019
1st Team pursuit, UCI Track World Championships
UCI Track World Cup

1st Team pursuit, Brisbane
2nd Team pursuit, Cambridge

2021
3rd Team pursuit, Summer Olympics

=== Road ===
2016
1st Stage 3 Tour of the Great South Coast
2nd Overall Tour of the King Valley
2017
National Under-23 Road Championships

1st Criterium
2nd Road race
3rd Time trial

4th Time trial, National Road Championships
