= Cameron Scott (cyclist) =

Australian cyclist (born 1998)

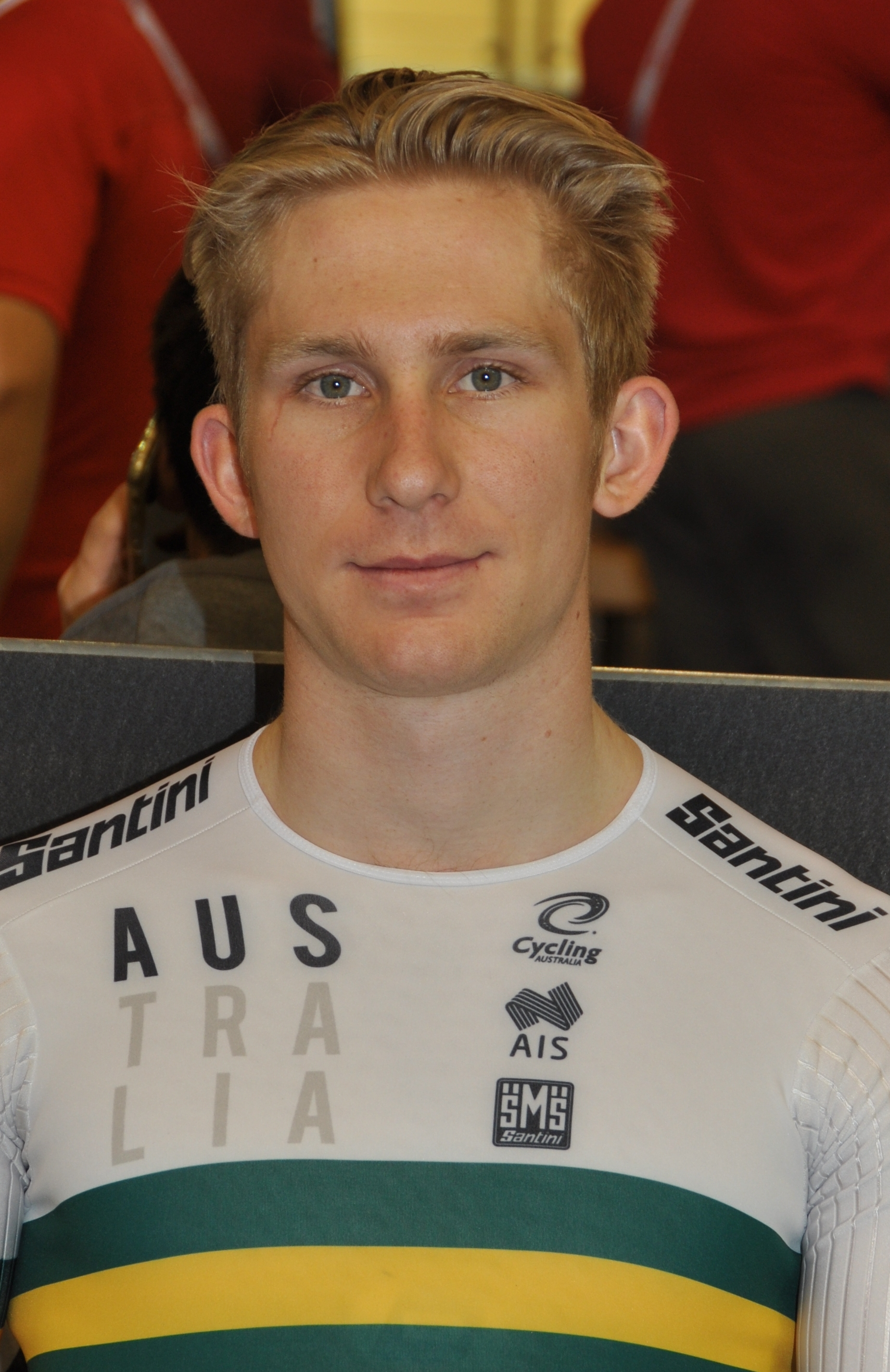
- Scott in 2018

Personal information
- Full name: Cameron Scott
- Born: 4 January 1998 (age 28) Wagga Wagga, Australia
- Height: 1.83 m (6 ft 0 in)
- Weight: 80 kg (176 lb)

Cycling career
- Sport: Cycling
- Current team: Team Bahrain Victorious
- Disciplines: Road; Track
- Role: Rider

Amateur teams
- 2016: Team UC Nantes Atlantique Junior
- 2017: New South Wales Institute of Sport

Professional teams
- 2018–2019: ACA–Ride Sunshine Coast
- 2021–2022: ARA Pro Racing Sunshine Coast
- 2023–2024: Team Bahrain Victorious
- 2025: CCACHE x Par Küp
- 2026–: Li-Ning Star
Medal record
World Championships
Gold medal – first place	2019 Pruszków	Team pursuit

Cameron Scott (born 4 January 1998) is an Australian cyclist, who currently rides for UCI Continental team Li-Ning Star.

== Major results ==
=== Road ===
2018
1st National Under-23 Criterium Championships
1st Stage 5 Tour of Qinghai Lake
1st Stage 2 New Zealand Cycle Classic
2019
1st Stage 4 Tour of the Great South Coast
3rd National Under-23 Criterium Championships
2022
1st Memorial Van Coningsloo
1st Melbourne to Warrnambool Classic
Tour of Gippsland

1st Stages 2 & 3

2nd Ronde van Overijssel
3rd National Criterium Championships
2026
1st Stage 3 Pune Grand Tour

=== Track ===
2014
Oceania Junior Championships

1st Kilometer
1st Team sprint
2nd Keirin

2015
UCI World Junior Championships

2nd Team sprint
3rd Kilometer

2016
Oceania Championships

2nd Madison
3rd Team pursuit

UCI World Junior Championships

2nd Team sprint
3rd Madison

2017
1st Six Days of Melbourne (with Leigh Howard)
3rd Scratch, Oceania Championships
2018
1st Team pursuit, Berlin, UCI World Cup
National Championships

2nd Madison (with Sam Welsford)
3rd Kilometer

3rd Scratch, Oceania Championships
2019
1st Team pursuit, UCI World Championships
2nd Team pursuit, Cambridge, UCI World Cup
2nd Six Days of Melbourne (with Sam Welsford)
3rd Madison (with Leigh Howard), National Championships
