= Jordan Kerby =

Australian-born New Zealand cyclist

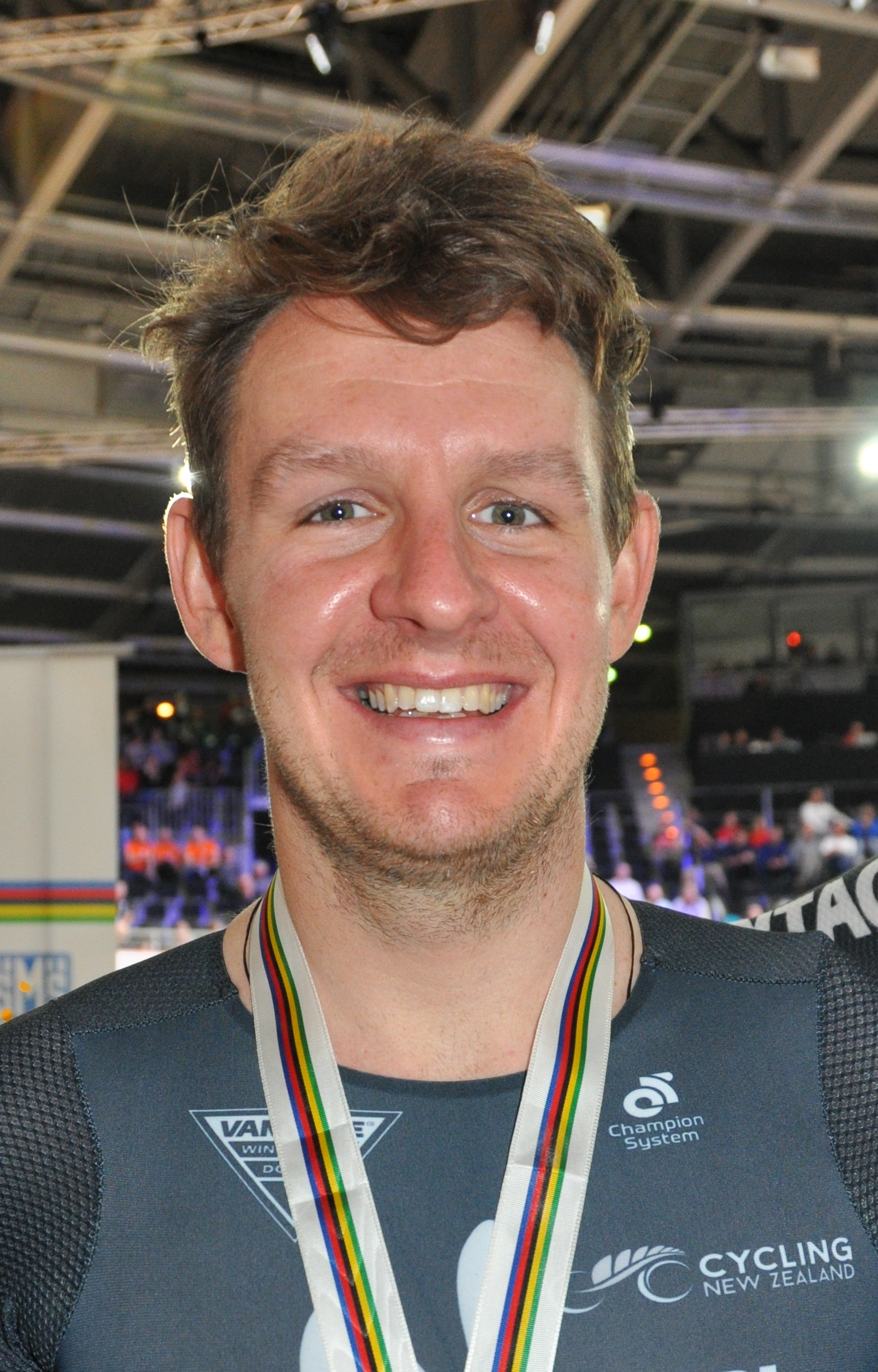
- Kerby at the 2020 UCI Track Cycling World Championships

Personal information
- Full name: Jordan Kerby
- Born: 15 August 1992 (age 34) Hervey Bay, Australia
- Height: 1.79 m (5 ft 10 in)
- Weight: 71 kg (157 lb)

Cycling career
- Sport: Cycling
- Disciplines: Road; Track
- Role: Rider
- Rider type: Time trialist (road); Pursuitist (track)

Amateur team
- 2011: Team Jayco–AIS

Professional teams
- 2013: Christina Watches–Onfone
- 2014–2016: Drapac Professional Cycling
- 2018: Brisbane Continental Cycling Team
- 2021–2022: Meiyo CCN Pro Cycling

Major wins
- Track World Championships Individual pursuit (2017)
Medal record
Men's track cycling
Representing Australia
World Championships
| Gold medal – first place | 2017 Hong Kong | Individual pursuit |
Commonwealth Games
| Gold medal – first place | 2018 Gold Coast | Team pursuit |
Representing New Zealand
World Championships
| Silver medal – second place | 2020 Berlin | Team pursuit |
Commonwealth Games
| Gold medal – first place | 2022 Birmingham | Team pursuit |

Jordan Kerby (born 15 August 1992) is an Australian-born New Zealand professional road and track cyclist, who last rode for UCI Continental team Meiyo CCN Pro Cycling. In 2017, he became the UCI Track Cycling World Champion in the men's individual pursuit in Hong Kong.

Kerby was part of the Australian team that took gold in the team pursuit at the 2018 Commonwealth Games on the Gold Coast. He subsequently switched allegiance to New Zealand and took gold in the same event at the 2022 Commonwealth Games in Birmingham.

== Major results ==
=== Track ===
2009
Australian National Junior Championships

1st Team pursuit
3rd Points race

2010
UCI World Junior Championships

1st Team pursuit
1st Points race

Oceanian Championships

1st Points race
3rd Team pursuit

1st Points race, Australian National Junior Championships
2011
2nd Team pursuit, Australian National Championships
2017
1st Individual pursuit, UCI World Championships
Oceanian Championships

1st Individual pursuit
1st Team pursuit
2nd Scratch

Australian National Championships

1st Individual pursuit
3rd Points race
3rd Scratch

2018
1st Team pursuit, Commonwealth Games
Australian National Championships

1st Individual pursuit
1st Points race

1st Team pursuit, UCI World Cup, Cambridge
2019
Oceanian Championships

1st Scratch
2nd Individual pursuit
3rd Madison

New Zealand National Championships

1st Omnium
1st Madison (with Campbell Stewart)
2nd Individual pursuit
2nd Points race

UCI World Cup

2nd Team pursuit, Brisbane
3rd Team pursuit, Cambridge

2020
1st Scratch, New Zealand National Championships
2nd Team pursuit, UCI World Championships
2022
1st Team pursuit, Commonwealth Games
3rd Individual pursuit, Oceanian Championships

=== Road ===
2012
1st Prologue Tour of Thailand
Oceania Championships

5th Under-23 road race
9th Road race

10th Overall Tour of China II
2013
1st Road race, Australian National Under-23 Championships
1st Prologue Herald Sun Tour
2014
1st Time trial, Australian National Under-23 Championships
9th Chrono Champenois
2015
Oceania Championships

2nd Road race
7th Time trial

2017
7th Overall New Zealand Cycle Classic
2018
1st Stage 5 New Zealand Cycle Classic
