= Charlie Tanfield =

British cyclist (born 1996)

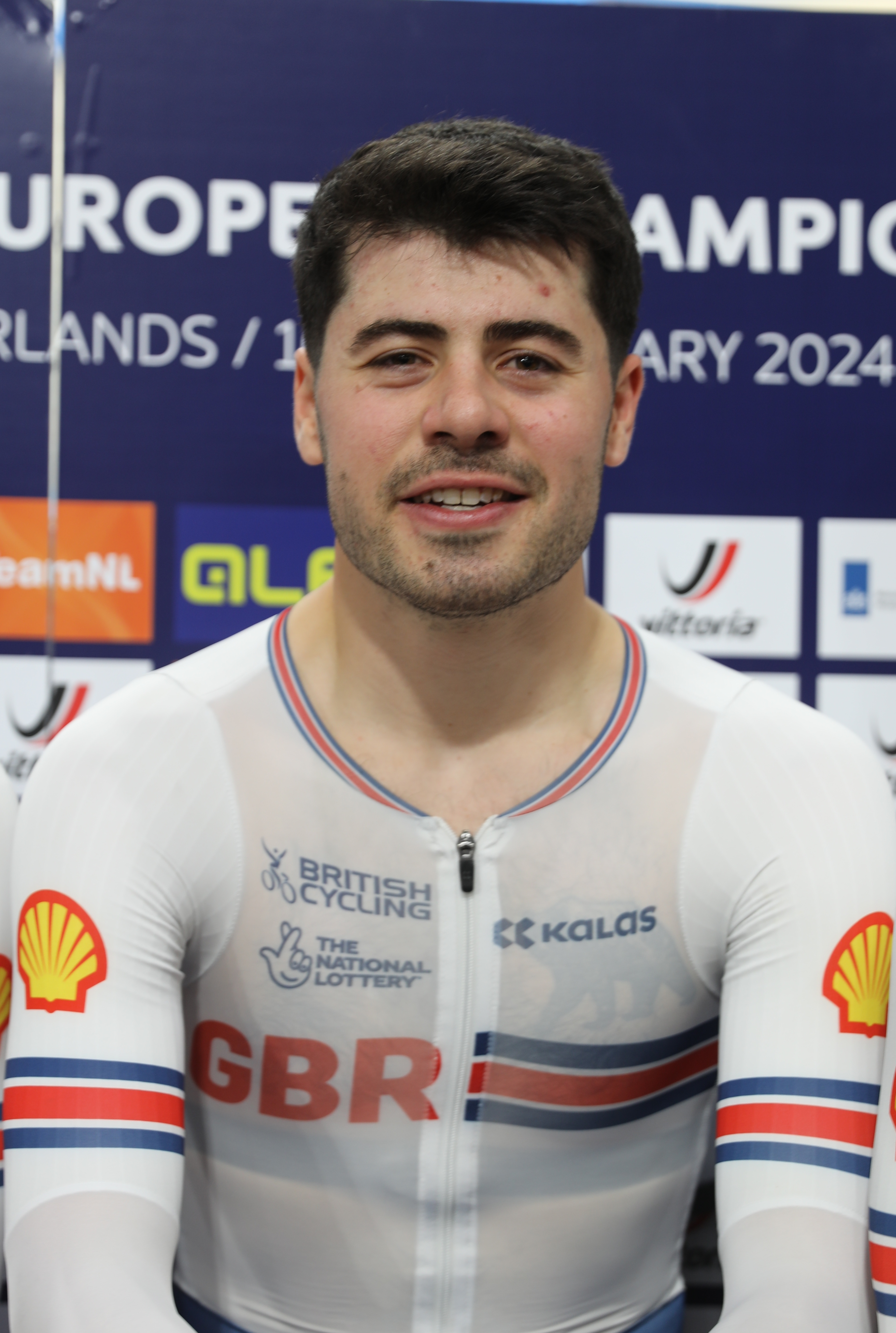
- Tanfield in 2024

Personal information
- Full name: Charles Tanfield
- Born: 17 November 1996 (age 29) Great Ayton, North Yorkshire, England
- Height: 1.90 m (6 ft 3 in)
- Weight: 82 kg (181 lb)

Cycling career
- Sport: Cycling
- Current team: Saint Piran
- Disciplines: Road; track
- Role: Rider
- Rider type: Pursuitist (track)

Amateur teams
- 2015: Easton Ritte Road Racing
- 2016: Planet X–Northside
- 2017: Brother NRG DriverPlan
- 2017: Bike Channel–Canyon (stagiaire)

Professional teams
- 2018–2021: Canyon Eisberg
- 2022: Ribble Weldtite
- 2023–: Saint Piran

Major wins
- Track World Championships Team pursuit (2018)
Medal record
Men's track cycling
Representing Great Britain
Olympic Games
Silver medal – second place	2024 Paris	Team pursuit
World Championships
Gold medal – first place	2018 Apeldoorn	Team pursuit
Silver medal – second place	2019 Pruszków	Team pursuit
Silver medal – second place	2024 Ballerup	Team pursuit
Bronze medal – third place	2021 Roubaix	Team pursuit
European Championships
Gold medal – first place	2024 Apeldoorn	Team pursuit
Silver medal – second place	2023 Grenchen	Team pursuit
Silver medal – second place	2024 Apeldoorn	Individual pursuit
Bronze medal – third place	2018 Glasgow	Team pursuit
Bronze medal – third place	2019 Apeldoorn	Team pursuit
Bronze medal – third place	2021 Grenchen	Team pursuit
Bronze medal – third place	2022 Munich	Team pursuit
Representing England
Commonwealth Games
Gold medal – first place	2018 Gold Coast	Individual pursuit
Gold medal – first place	2026 Glasgow	Team pursuit
Silver medal – second place	2018 Gold Coast	Team pursuit
Silver medal – second place	2022 Birmingham	Team pursuit

Charles Tanfield (born 17 November 1996) is a British racing cyclist, who rides for UCI Continental team Saint Piran and the Great Britain national track cycling team.

He competed at the 2024 Summer Olympics in Paris winning the silver medal in the Team pursuit. He also competed at the 2020 Summer Olympics in Tokyo in the team pursuit.

Tanfield was the 2018 Commonwealth Games individual pursuit champion, the 2018 World Championships team pursuit world champion and 2024 UEC European Track Championships and 2026 Commonwealth Games team pursuit champion.

== Early life ==
Tanfield grew up in Great Ayton in North Yorkshire. He attended Stokesley School.

== Career ==
He rode in the men's team pursuit event at the 2018 UCI Track Cycling World Championships, winning the gold medal. Tanfield won silver in the team pursuit and gold in the individual pursuit at the 2018 Commonwealth Games where he set of time of 4:11.455, the third fastest individual pursuit time in history. Tanfield went on to claim a second silver in the team pursuit at the 2022 Commonwealth Games.

Tanfield won two more national titles at the 2023 British Cycling National Track Championships bringing his total to five at the time. He won the individual pursuit for the second time and the team pursuit for the third time.

He went on to win a silver medal at the 2024 Summer Olympics in the team pursuit, his second Olympic Games.

On 30 July 2026, Tanfield was part of the England team pursuit lineup that won the gold medal at the 2026 Commonwealth Games in Glasgow, beating Australia in the final having lost to them previously in the 2024 Olympic Games final.

== Personal life ==
His brother Harry Tanfield, who is two years older than him, is also a cyclist and a silver medallist at the 2018 Commonwealth Games road time trial.

== Major results ==
=== Road ===
2017
3rd Time trial, National Under-23 Championships
5th Duo Normand (with Harry Tanfield)
2018
1st Time trial, National Under-23 Championships
8th Time trial, Commonwealth Games
2021
1st Castle Douglas, Tour Series
2023
4th Time trial, National Championships

=== Track ===
2017
National Championships

1st Team pursuit
2nd Individual pursuit

2018
1st Team pursuit, UCI World Championships
Commonwealth Games

1st Individual pursuit
2nd Team pursuit

UCI World Cup, Minsk

1st Individual pursuit
1st Team pursuit

National Championships

1st Individual pursuit
2nd Team pursuit

3rd Team pursuit, UEC European Championships
2019
1st Team pursuit, National Championships
2nd Team pursuit, UCI World Championships
3rd Team pursuit, UEC European Championships
2021
3rd Team pursuit, UCI World Championships
3rd Team pursuit, UEC European Championships
2022
UCI Nations Cup, Glasgow

2nd Team pursuit
3rd Individual pursuit

2nd Team pursuit, Commonwealth Games
2nd Individual pursuit, National Championships
3rd Team pursuit, UEC European Championships
2023
National Championships

1st Individual pursuit
1st Team pursuit

2nd Team pursuit, UEC European Championships
3rd Team pursuit, UCI Nations Cup, Jakarta
2024
UEC European Championships

1st Team pursuit
2nd Individual pursuit

UCI Nations Cup

1st Team pursuit, Adelaide
1st Team pursuit, Milton

2nd Team pursuit, Olympic Games
2nd Team pursuit, UCI World Championships
2026
1st Team pursuit, Commonwealth Games
National Championships

1st Individual pursuit
2nd Points race
3rd Elimination
