= Julius Johansen =

Danish cyclist (born 1999)

Personal information
- Full name: Julius Johansen
- Born: 13 September 1999 (age 27) Blovstrød, Denmark
- Height: 1.88 m (6 ft 2 in)
- Weight: 75 kg (165 lb)

Cycling career
- Sport: Cycling
- Current team: UAE Team Emirates XRG
- Disciplines: Road; Track
- Role: Rider
- Rider type: Time trialist, Rouleur

Professional teams
- 2018–2019: Team ColoQuick
- 2020–2021: Uno-X Norwegian Development Team
- 2022–2023: Intermarché–Wanty–Gobert Matériaux
- 2024: Sabgal–Anicolor
- 2025–: UAE Team Emirates XRG

Major wins
- Track World Championships Team pursuit (2020)
Medal record
Men's track cycling
Representing Denmark
World Championships
Gold medal – first place	2020 Berlin	Team pursuit
Silver medal – second place	2018 Apeldoorn	Team pursuit
Bronze medal – third place	2019 Pruszków	Team pursuit
European Championships
Gold medal – first place	2019 Apeldoorn	Team pursuit
Silver medal – second place	2017 Berlin	Omnium

Julius Johansen (born 13 September 1999) is a Danish professional racing cyclist, who currently rides for UCI WorldTeam UAE Team Emirates XRG. He rode in the men's team pursuit event at the 2017 UCI Track Cycling World Championships and won gold at the 2017 UCI Road World Championships in the junior men's road race.

== Major results ==
=== Road ===
2016
1st Stage 1 Aubel–Thimister–La Gleize
7th Overall Trophée Centre Morbihan
2017
1st Road race, UCI World Junior Championships
National Junior Championships

1st Road race
1st Time trial

1st Overall Trofeo Karlsberg

1st Stage 3b (ITT)

2nd Time trial, UEC European Junior Championships
2018
1st Road race, National Under-23 Championships
1st Overall Olympia's Tour

1st Young rider classification
1st Stage 1

5th Overall Danmark Rundt

1st Young rider classification

2019
2nd Overall Tour du Loir-et-Cher

1st Young rider classification

2020
National Under-23 Championships

1st Road race
1st Time trial

8th Overall Tour Poitou-Charentes en Nouvelle-Aquitaine
2021
3rd Time trial, National Under-23 Championships
6th Paris–Tours Espoirs
2026 (5 pro wins)
1st Prologue Boucles de la Mayenne
1st Stage 1 (ITT) O Gran Camiño
1st Stage 1b (ITT) Sibiu Cycling Tour
1st Prologue & Stage 5 (ITT) Volta a Portugal

==== Grand Tour general classification results timeline ====
Grand Tour	2022	2023	2024	2025	2026
Giro d'Italia	—	—	—	—	—
Tour de France	—	—	—	—	—
Vuelta a España	129	98	—	—	

Legend
—	Did not compete
DNF	Did not finish

=== Track ===
2017
UCI World Junior Championships

1st Omnium
1st Madison (with Mathias Alexander Larsen)

UCI World Cup

1st Team pursuit, Cali
2nd Team pursuit, Pruszków

2nd Omnium, UEC European Championships
2018
1st Team pursuit, UCI World Cup, Saint-Quentin-en-Yvelines
2nd Team pursuit, UCI World Championships
2019
1st Team pursuit, UEC European Championships
UCI World Cup

1st Team pursuit, Glasgow
1st Team pursuit, Minsk

3rd Team pursuit, UCI World Championships
2020
1st Team pursuit, UCI World Championships
