= Ethan Hayter =

British cyclist (born 1998)

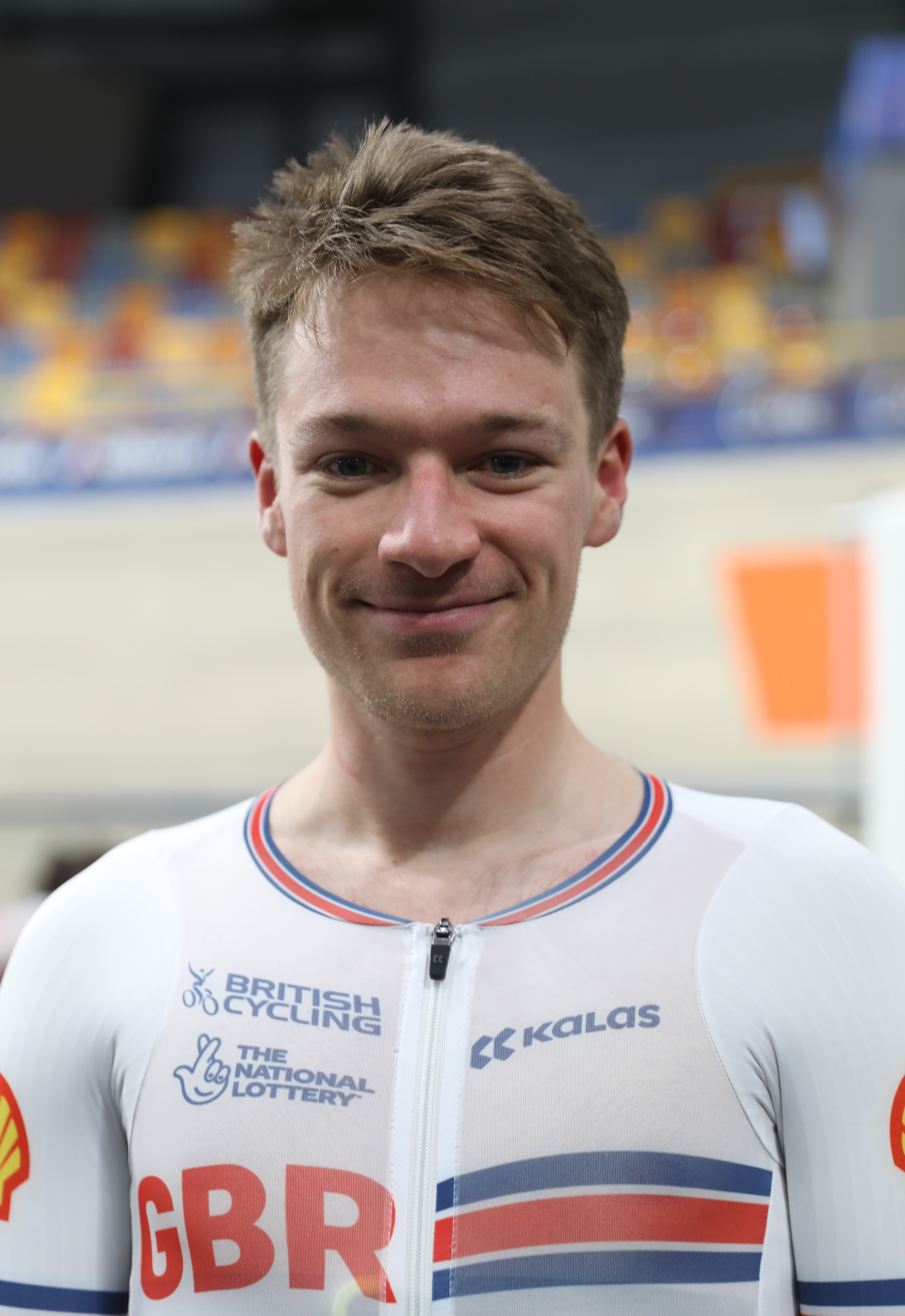
- Hayter in 2024

Personal information
- Full name: Ethan Edward Hayter
- Born: 18 September 1998 (age 28) London, England
- Height: 1.80 m (5 ft 11 in)
- Weight: 69 kg (152 lb)

Cycling career
- Sport: Cycling
- Current team: Soudal–Quick-Step
- Disciplines: Road; Track
- Role: Rider
- Rider type: All-rounder (road); Time trialist

Amateur teams
- 2012–2016: VC Londres
- 2017–2018: 100% Me
- 2018: Team Sky (stagiaire)
- 2019: VC Londres

Professional teams
- 2020–2024: Team INEOS
- 2025–: Soudal–Quick-Step

Major wins
- Road Stage races Tour de Pologne (2022) Tour of Norway (2021) One-day races and Classics National Road Race Championships (2024) National Time Trial Championships (2021, 2022, 2025, 2026) Track World Championships Team pursuit (2018, 2022) Omnium (2021, 2022)
Medal record
Men's track cycling
Representing Great Britain
Olympic Games
Silver medal – second place	2020 Tokyo	Madison
Silver medal – second place	2024 Paris	Team pursuit
World Championships
Gold medal – first place	2018 Apeldoorn	Team pursuit
Gold medal – first place	2021 Roubaix	Omnium
Gold medal – first place	2022 Saint-Quentin-en-Yvelines	Team pursuit
Gold medal – first place	2022 Saint-Quentin-en-Yvelines	Omnium
Silver medal – second place	2019 Pruszków	Team pursuit
Silver medal – second place	2022 Saint-Quentin-en-Yvelines	Madison
Silver medal – second place	2024 Ballerup	Team pursuit
Bronze medal – third place	2019 Pruszków	Omnium
Bronze medal – third place	2021 Roubaix	Team pursuit
European Championships
Gold medal – first place	2018 Glasgow	Omnium
Gold medal – first place	2024 Apeldoorn	Omnium
Gold medal – first place	2024 Apeldoorn	Team pursuit
Bronze medal – third place	2018 Glasgow	Madison
Bronze medal – third place	2018 Glasgow	Team pursuit
Bronze medal – third place	2019 Apeldoorn	Team pursuit
Representing England
Commonwealth Games
Silver medal – second place	2018 Gold Coast	Team pursuit
Bronze medal – third place	2018 Gold Coast	Points race

Ethan Edward Hayter (born 18 September 1998) is an English road and track cyclist, who currently rides for UCI WorldTeam Soudal–Quick-Step.

== Career ==
Hayter started riding at Herne Hill Velodrome in 2012, aged 13. He raced for the VC Londres cycling club from 2012 to 2016, and remains an honorary member. In 2016 he joined British Cycling's Senior Academy squad, relinquishing his A-level studies in order to join the programme.

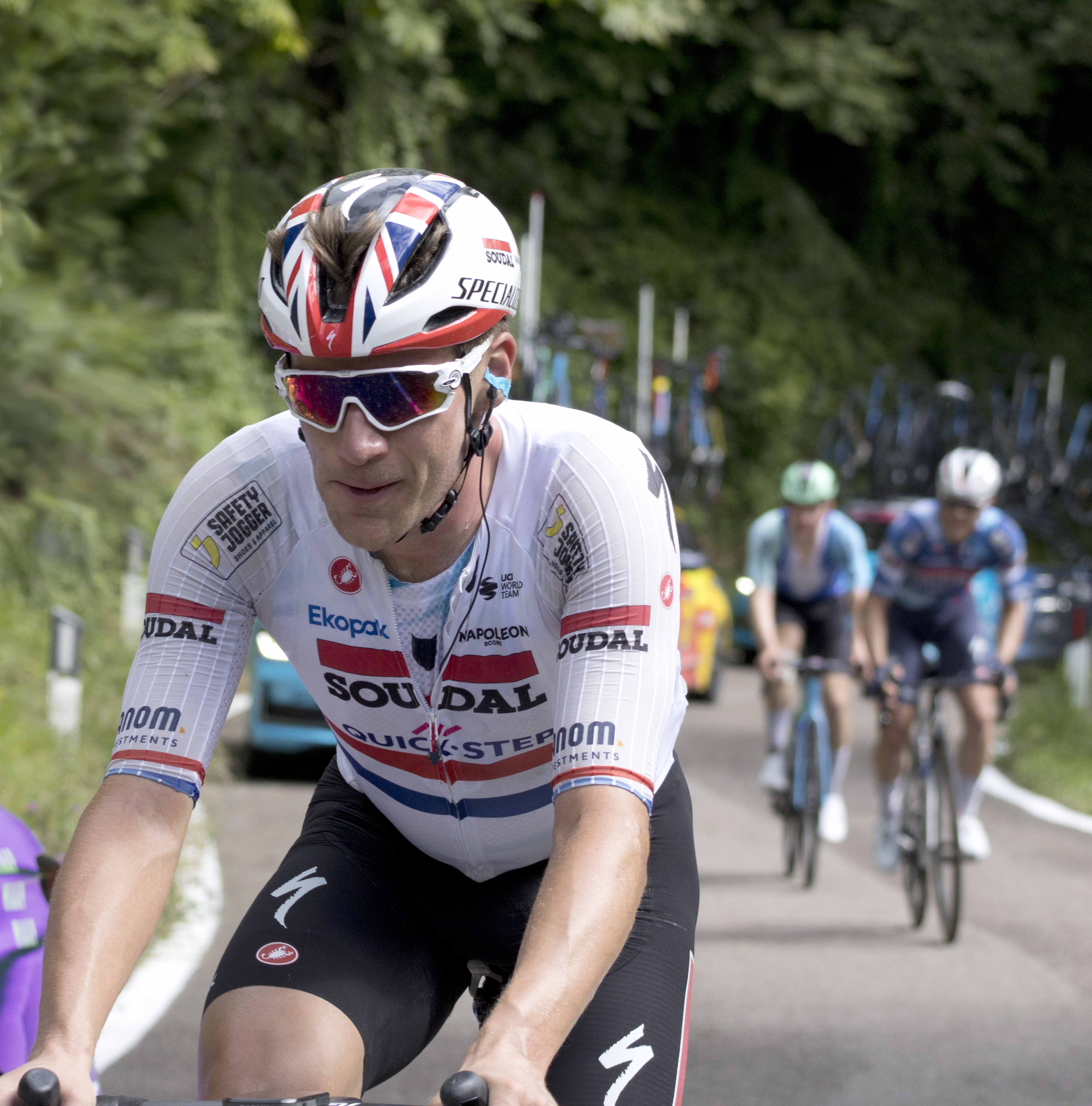
Hayter wearing his national champion jersey during the 2025 Giro d'Italia

He rode in the men's team pursuit event at the 2018 UCI Track Cycling World Championships, winning a gold medal. In August 2018 it was reported that Hayter had joined Team Sky as a stagiaire until the end of the year. That month he also competed at the European Track Championships in Glasgow, where he took bronze medals as part of the British team pursuit squad, the Madison pairing alongside Oliver Wood and an individual gold in the omnium.

In November 2019, it was announced that Hayter would race for Team INEOS from 2020, on a three-year contract. Hayter competed in the Paris 2024 Olympics.

In August 2024 it was announced that Hayter would be leaving INEOS Grenadiers and would move to Soudal–Quick-Step from 2025 on a two-season contract.

== Personal life ==
As of 2021 he was living in Manchester with fellow cyclist Fred Wright. He is the older brother and Team Ineos teammate of Leo Hayter.

== Major results ==
=== Road ===
2015
2nd Overall Keizer der Juniores
2016
1st Kuurne–Brussels–Kuurne Juniores
2nd Overall Trofeo Karlsberg
2nd Overall Junior Tour of Wales
2nd Gent–Wevelgem Junioren
2nd Guido Reybrouck Classic
8th Overall Grand Prix Rüebliland
2017
7th Gran Premio di Poggiana
2018
4th Time trial, National Under-23 Championships
UCI World Under-23 Championships

5th Time trial
8th Road race

5th Overall Ronde de l'Oise
2019
National Under-23 Championships

1st Road race
2nd Time trial

1st Overall Paris–Arras Tour

1st Young rider classification
1st Stage 2

Giro Ciclistico d'Italia

1st Points classification
1st Prologue & Stage 1

1st Stage 3 Tour de l'Avenir
5th Road race, National Championships
8th Overall Orlen Nations Grand Prix
10th London–Surrey Classic
2020 (1 pro win)
1st Giro dell'Appennino
2nd Memorial Marco Pantani
3rd Giro della Toscana
9th Coppa Sabatini
2021 (9)
National Championships

1st Time trial
1st Circuit race
3rd Road race

1st Overall Tour of Norway

1st Stages 1 & 2

2nd Overall Tour of Britain

1st Points classification
1st Stages 3 (TTT) & 5

2nd Overall Volta ao Algarve

1st Stage 2

4th Overall Settimana Internazionale di Coppi e Bartali

1st Young rider classification
1st Stage 3

4th Bretagne Classic
7th Overall Vuelta a Andalucía

1st Points classification
1st Stages 2 & 5

8th Time trial, UCI World Championships
2022 (6)
1st Time trial, National Championships
1st Overall Tour de Pologne
Tour de Romandie

1st Points classification
1st Prologue & Stage 2

Settimana Internazionale di Coppi e Bartali

1st Points classification
1st Stage 2

1st Stage 2 Tour of Norway
4th Overall Volta ao Algarve
UCI World Championships

4th Time trial
9th Road race

Vuelta a España

Held after Stages 1–4

2023 (2)
Tour de Romandie

1st Points classification
1st Stage 2

1st Stage 1 Tour of the Basque Country
3rd Overall Tour of Guangxi

1st Young rider classification

3rd Overall CRO Race
7th Giro della Toscana
2024 (1)
1st Road race, National Championships
7th Overall Tour of Norway
2025 (5)
National Championships

1st Time trial
4th Road race

Tour of Holland

1st Prologue & Stage 2 (ITT)

1st Stage 4 (ITT) Tour de Luxembourg
2nd Overall Tour of Belgium

1st Stage 3 (ITT)

4th Time trial, UEC European Championships
2026 (1)
1st Time trial, National Championships
Vuelta a España

Combativity award Stages 2, 5 & 11

==== Grand Tour general classification results timeline ====
Grand Tour	2022
Giro d'Italia	—
Tour de France	—
Vuelta a España	DNF

=== Track ===
2015
National Junior Championships

1st Individual pursuit
1st Madison (with Fred Wright)
2nd Scratch

2016
1st Madison, National Championships (with Joe Holt)
National Junior Championships

1st Individual pursuit
3rd Madison

UEC European Junior Championships

1st Team pursuit
2nd Omnium

3rd Team pursuit, UCI World Junior Championships
2017
National Championships

1st Madison (with Matt Walls)
1st Scratch
2nd Omnium
2nd Points race
2nd Team pursuit
3rd Individual pursuit

UEC European Under-23 Championships

1st Team pursuit
2nd Points race

1st Six Days of Berlin Under-23 (with Matt Walls)
2018
1st Team pursuit, UCI World Championships
UEC European Championships

1st Omnium
3rd Team pursuit
3rd Madison (with Oli Wood)

UEC European Under-23 Championships

1st Madison (with Matt Walls)
1st Omnium

Commonwealth Games

2nd Team pursuit
3rd Points race

National Championships

1st Team pursuit
2nd Points race

2019
National Championships

1st Omnium
1st Scratch

UCI World Championships

2nd Team pursuit
3rd Omnium

3rd Team pursuit, UEC European Championships
2021
UCI World Championships

1st Omnium
3rd Team pursuit

2nd Madison, Olympic Games (with Matt Walls)
2022
UCI World Championships

1st Team pursuit
1st Omnium
2nd Madison (with Oli Wood)

UCI Nations Cup, Milton

1st Omnium
2nd Madison (with Rhys Britton)

2024
UEC European Championships

1st Team pursuit
1st Omnium

UCI Nations Cup, Milton

1st Omnium
1st Team pursuit

2nd Team pursuit, Olympic Games
2nd Team pursuit, UCI World Championships
