= Valère Thiébaud =

Swiss cyclist (born 1999)

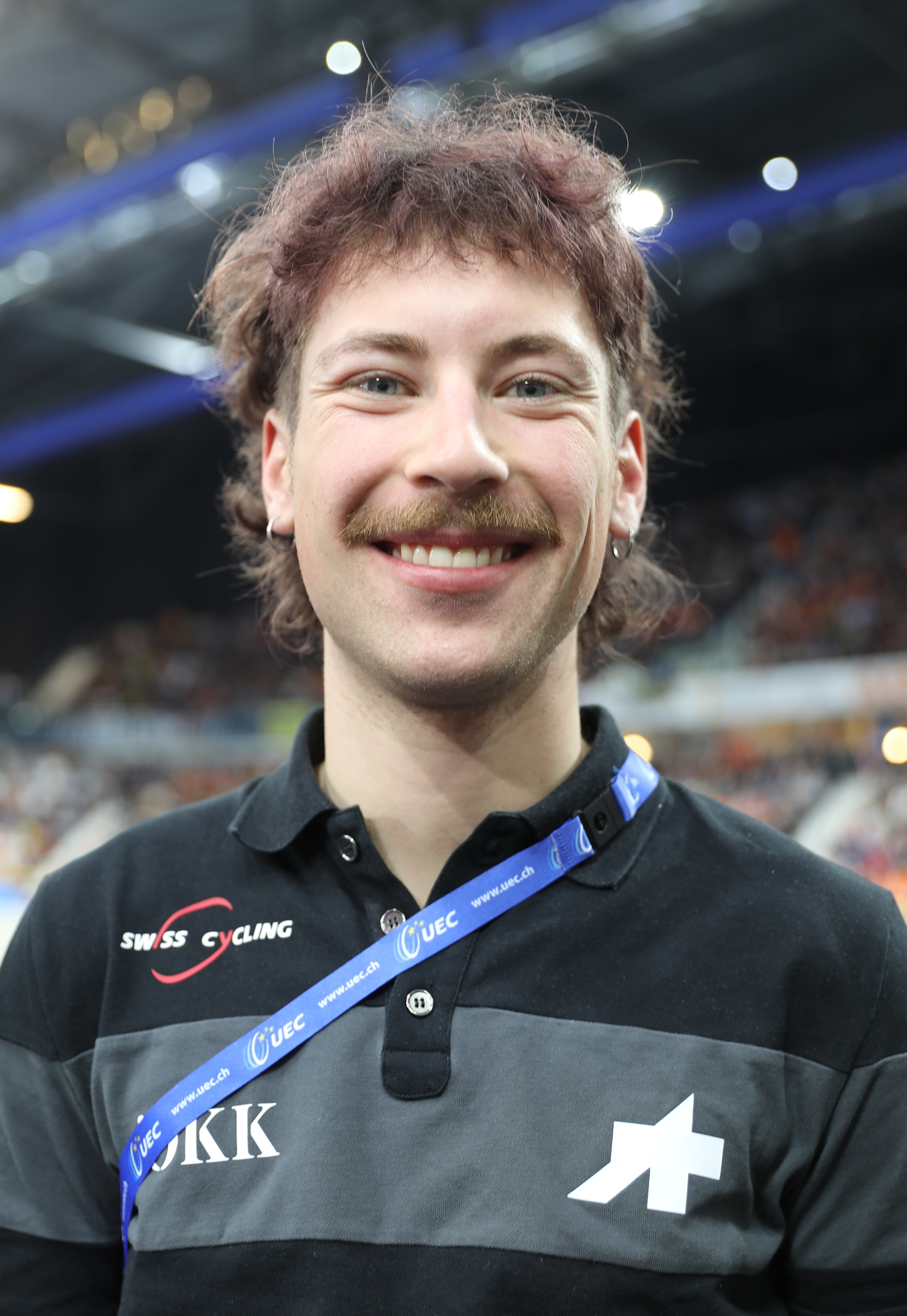
- Thiébaud in 2024

Personal information
- Full name: Valère Thiébaud
- Born: 26 January 1999 (age 27) Neuchâtel, Switzerland

Cycling career
- Sport: Cycling
- Current team: Elite Fondations Cycling Team
- Disciplines: Road; Track
- Role: Rider

Amateur teams
- 2016–2018: Zeta Cycling Club
- 2021: Cogeas–Sogecoma–Akros
- 2022: AVC Aix-en-Provence
- 2023–: Elite Fondations Cycling Team

Professional team
- 2019–2020: Akros–Thömus
Medal record
Representing Switzerland
Men's track cycling
European Championships
Silver medal – second place	2021 Grenchen	Team pursuit

Valère Thiébaud (born 26 January 1999) is a Swiss racing cyclist, who currently rides for Swiss amateur team Elite Foundations Cycling Team. He rode in the men's team pursuit event at the 2018 UCI Track Cycling World Championships.

== Major results ==
=== Road ===
2017
National Junior Road Championships

1st Road race
3rd Time trial

2018
10th Overall Tour of Black Sea
2021
National Under-23 Road Championships

1st Road race
1st Time trial

=== Track ===
2017
3rd Team pursuit, UEC European Junior Championships
2018
2nd Team pursuit, UEC European Under-23 Championships
National Championships

2nd Individual pursuit
2nd Madison

2019
UEC European Under-23 Championships

2nd Points race
3rd Team pursuit

National Championships

2nd Points race
3rd Madison

2020
2nd Madison (with Robin Froidevaux), UEC European Under-23 Championships
2021
2nd Team pursuit, UEC European Championships
2022
National Championships

1st Scratch
1st Madison
