= Ed Clancy =

English racing cyclist (born 1985)

Ed Clancy OBE
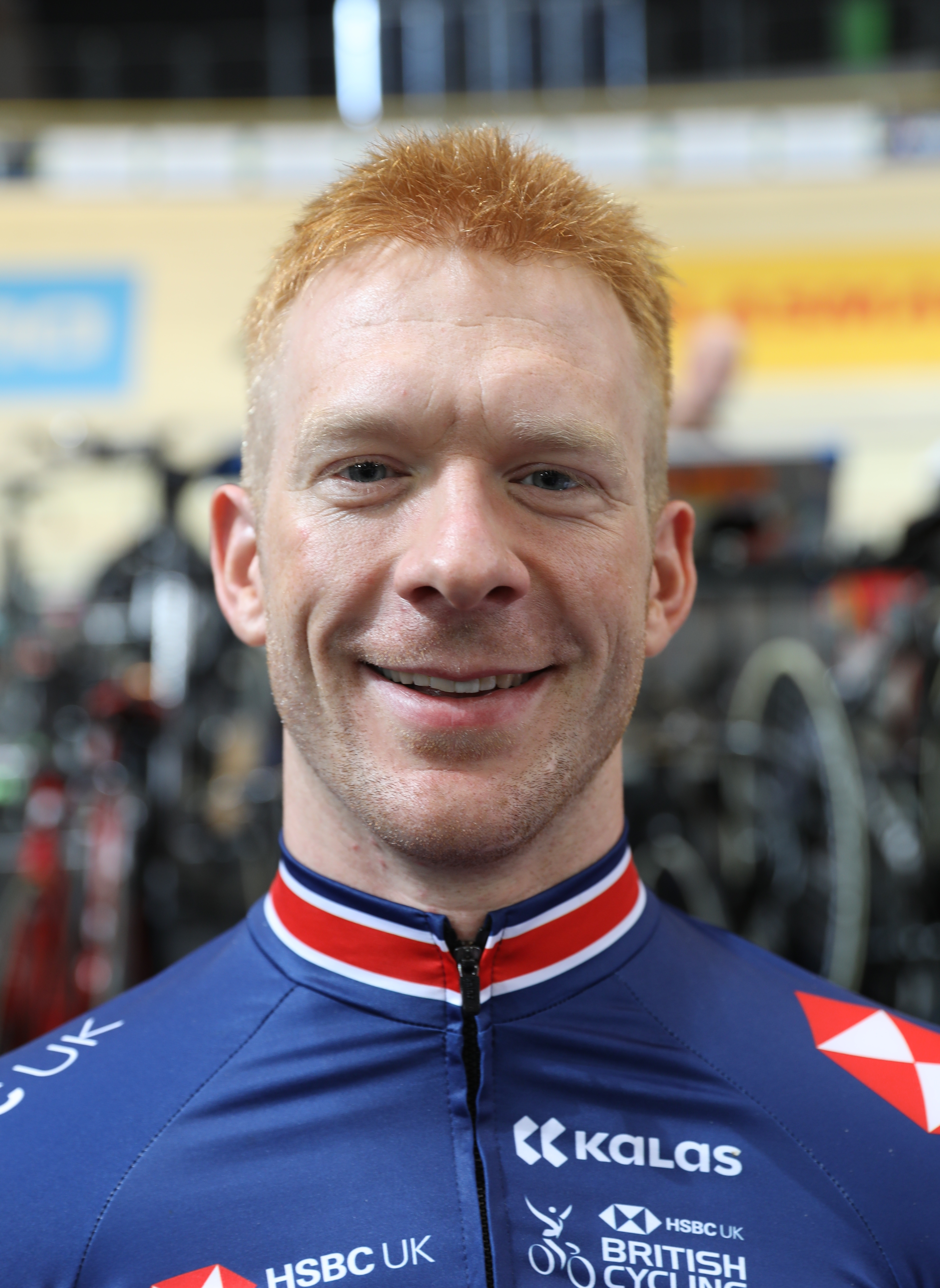
- Clancy in 2019

Personal information
- Full name: Edward Franklin Clancy
- Born: 12 March 1985 (age 41) Barnsley, South Yorkshire, England
- Height: 1.86 m (6 ft 1 in)
- Weight: 78 kg (172 lb)

Cycling career
- Sport: Cycling
- Disciplines: Road; Track
- Role: Rider
- Rider type: Endurance

Amateur teams
- 2005–2006: Sparkasse
- 2006: Landbouwkrediet–Colnago (stagiaire)
- 2020–2021: Clancy Briggs Cycling Academy

Professional teams
- 2007–2008: Landbouwkrediet–Tönissteiner
- 2009: Team Halfords
- 2010: Motorpoint–Marshalls Pasta
- 2011–2018: Rapha Condor–Sharp
- 2019: Vitus Pro Cycling Team p/b Brother UK

Major wins
- Track Olympic Games Team pursuit (2008, 2012, 2016) World Championships Team pursuit (2005, 2007, 2008, 2012, 2018) Omnium (2010)
Medal record
Men's track cycling
Representing Great Britain
Olympic Games
Gold medal – first place	2008 Beijing	Team pursuit
Gold medal – first place	2012 London	Team pursuit
Gold medal – first place	2016 Rio de Janeiro	Team pursuit
Bronze medal – third place	2012 London	Omnium
World Championships
Gold medal – first place	2005 Los Angeles	Team pursuit
Gold medal – first place	2007 Palma de Mallorca	Team pursuit
Gold medal – first place	2008 Manchester	Team pursuit
Gold medal – first place	2010 Ballerup	Omnium
Gold medal – first place	2012 Melbourne	Team pursuit
Gold medal – first place	2018 Apeldoorn	Team pursuit
Silver medal – second place	2010 Ballerup	Team pursuit
Silver medal – second place	2013 Minsk	Team pursuit
Silver medal – second place	2015 Yvelines	Team pursuit
Silver medal – second place	2016 London	Team pursuit
Silver medal – second place	2019 Pruszków	Team pursuit
Bronze medal – third place	2011 Apeldoorn	Team pursuit
European Championships
Gold medal – first place	2010 Pruszków	Team pursuit
Gold medal – first place	2011 Apeldoorn	Team pursuit
Gold medal – first place	2011 Apeldoorn	Omnium
Gold medal – first place	2013 Apeldoorn	Team pursuit
Gold medal – first place	2014 Guadeloupe	Team pursuit
Bronze medal – third place	2014 Guadeloupe	Scratch
Bronze medal – third place	2019 Apeldoorn	Team pursuit
Representing England
Commonwealth Games
Silver medal – second place	2014 Glasgow	Team pursuit

Edward Franklin Clancy (born 12 March 1985) is a British former professional track and road bicycle racer, who competed between 2004 and 2021.

During his career, Clancy won four medals (three gold, one bronze) at the Summer Olympic Games, twelve medals (six gold, five silver and one bronze) at the UCI Track Cycling World Championships, seven medals (five gold, two bronze) at the UEC European Track Championships, as well as a silver medal at the 2014 Commonwealth Games. He also was part of eight world record times in the team pursuit, and was appointed a Member of the Order of the British Empire (MBE) in the 2009 New Year Honours, and an Officer of the Order of the British Empire (OBE) in the 2017 New Year Honours for services to cycling.

== Career ==
On 17 August 2008, Clancy was a member of the Olympic team pursuit squad which broke the world record in the heats with 3:55.202, beating Russia to the ride-off for silver and gold. The next day, on their way to winning the gold medal, the British team broke their own world record in 3:53.314, beating Denmark by 6.7 seconds.

On 4 April 2012, Clancy was part of the Great Britain team which set a new world record of 3:53.295 in winning the gold medal in the team pursuit at the 2012 World Track Cycling Championships in Melbourne.

After the 2012 Olympic Games, where he set a time of 1:00.981 in the Omnium Kilo Time Trial, British Cycling announced that Clancy would replace Sir Chris Hoy in the Great Britain team for the team sprint event, where he rode in the Man 3 position. Despite finishing 2nd in the Glasgow round of the World Cup, Clancy returned to the endurance team for the 2013 World Championships.

In November 2018, it was announced that Clancy would join the Vitus Pro Cycling Team p/b Brother UK for the 2019 season, after the JLT–Condor team which he had been part of for eight years confirmed that it would be disbanding at the end of the year.

In August 2021, during the delayed 2020 Summer Olympics, Clancy announced his retirement. His final competition was the 2021 UCI Track Champions League, which concluded in December of that year with a double header at the Lee Valley VeloPark.

In February 2023 Clancy was announced as the new active travel commissioner for South Yorkshire, following Dame Sarah Storey and working for South Yorkshire Mayor Oliver Coppard.

== Personal life ==
He lives in Holmfirth, West Yorkshire.

== Career achievements ==
=== Major results ===
==== Road ====
2005
4th Overall Tour de Berlin

1st Stage 1

2006
10th Overall Tour de Berlin
2007
2nd National Criterium Championships
2009
1st Eddy Soens Memorial Road Race
1st Southport, Tour Series
2010
1st National Criterium Championships
2011
1st Aberystwyth, Tour Series
1st Stage 5 Tour de Korea
2012
1st Peterborough, Tour Series
2013
Tour Series

1st Aberystwyth
1st Torquay
1st Woking

2015
Tour Series

1st Aberystwyth
1st Peterborough

1st London Nocturne
3rd Milk Race
2018
1st London Nocturne
1st Prologue Herald Sun Tour

==== Track ====
2004
National Championships

2nd Madison (with Mark Cavendish)
2nd Team pursuit

2005
1st Team pursuit, UCI World Championships
1st Team pursuit, National Championships
UCI World Cup Classics, Sydney

2nd Individual pursuit
2nd Team pursuit

2006
1st Team pursuit, UEC European Under-23 Championships
1st Team pursuit, National Championships
UCI World Cup Classics

1st Team pursuit, Moscow
3rd Team pursuit, Sydney

2007
1st Team pursuit, UCI World Championships
UCI World Cup Classics

1st Team pursuit, Manchester
1st Team pursuit, Sydney
1st Team pursuit, Beijing

National Championships

2nd Individual pursuit
2nd Kilo

2008
1st Team pursuit, Olympic Games
1st Team pursuit, UCI World Championships
UCI World Cup Classics

1st Team pursuit, Copenhagen
1st Individual pursuit, Manchester
1st Team pursuit, Manchester

2009
UCI World Cup Classics

1st Team pursuit, Copenhagen
1st Team pursuit, Manchester
2nd Team pursuit, Melbourne

2nd Kilo, National Championships
2010
UCI World Championships

1st Omnium
2nd Team pursuit

1st Team pursuit, UEC European Championships
UCI World Cup Classics

1st Omnium, Cali
3rd Omnium, Melbourne
3rd Team pursuit, Melbourne

2011
UEC European Championships

1st Omnium
1st Team pursuit

1st Team pursuit, UCI World Cup Classics, Manchester
3rd Team pursuit, UCI World Championships
2012
Olympic Games

1st Team pursuit
3rd Omnium

1st Team pursuit, UCI World Championships
UCI World Cup

2nd Team pursuit, London
2nd Team sprint, Glasgow

2013
1st Team pursuit, UEC European Championships
National Championships

1st Individual pursuit
1st Points race
2nd Kilo
2nd Scratch

1st Team pursuit, UCI World Cup, Manchester
2nd Team pursuit, UCI World Championships
2014
UEC European Championships

1st Team pursuit
3rd Scratch

2nd Team pursuit, Commonwealth Games
2015
2nd Team pursuit, UCI World Championships
2016
1st Team pursuit, Olympic Games
2nd Team pursuit, UCI World Championships
2017
1st Team pursuit, UCI World Cup, Manchester
2018
1st Team pursuit, UCI World Championships
UCI World Cup

2nd Team pursuit, Saint-Quentin-en-Yvelines
3rd Team pursuit, Milton

2019
2nd Team pursuit, UCI World Championships
3rd Team pursuit, UEC European Championships

=== World records ===
Discipline	Record	Date	Event	Velodrome	Ref
Team pursuit	3:56.322	27 March 2008	World Championships	Manchester	
Team pursuit	3:55.202	17 August 2008	Olympic Games	Laoshan (Beijing)	
Team pursuit	3:53.314	18 August 2008	Olympic Games	Laoshan (Beijing)	
Team pursuit	3:53.295	4 April 2012	World Championships	Hisense Arena (Melbourne)	
Team pursuit	3:52.499	2 August 2012	Olympic Games	Lee Valley (London)	
Team pursuit	3:51.659	3 August 2012	Olympic Games	Lee Valley (London)	
Team pursuit	3:50.570	12 August 2016	Olympic Games	Rio Olympic	
Team pursuit	3:50.265	12 August 2016	Olympic Games	Rio Olympic	

== See also ==
- 2012 Summer Olympics and Paralympics gold post boxes
