= Szymon Krawczyk =

Polish cyclist (born 1998)

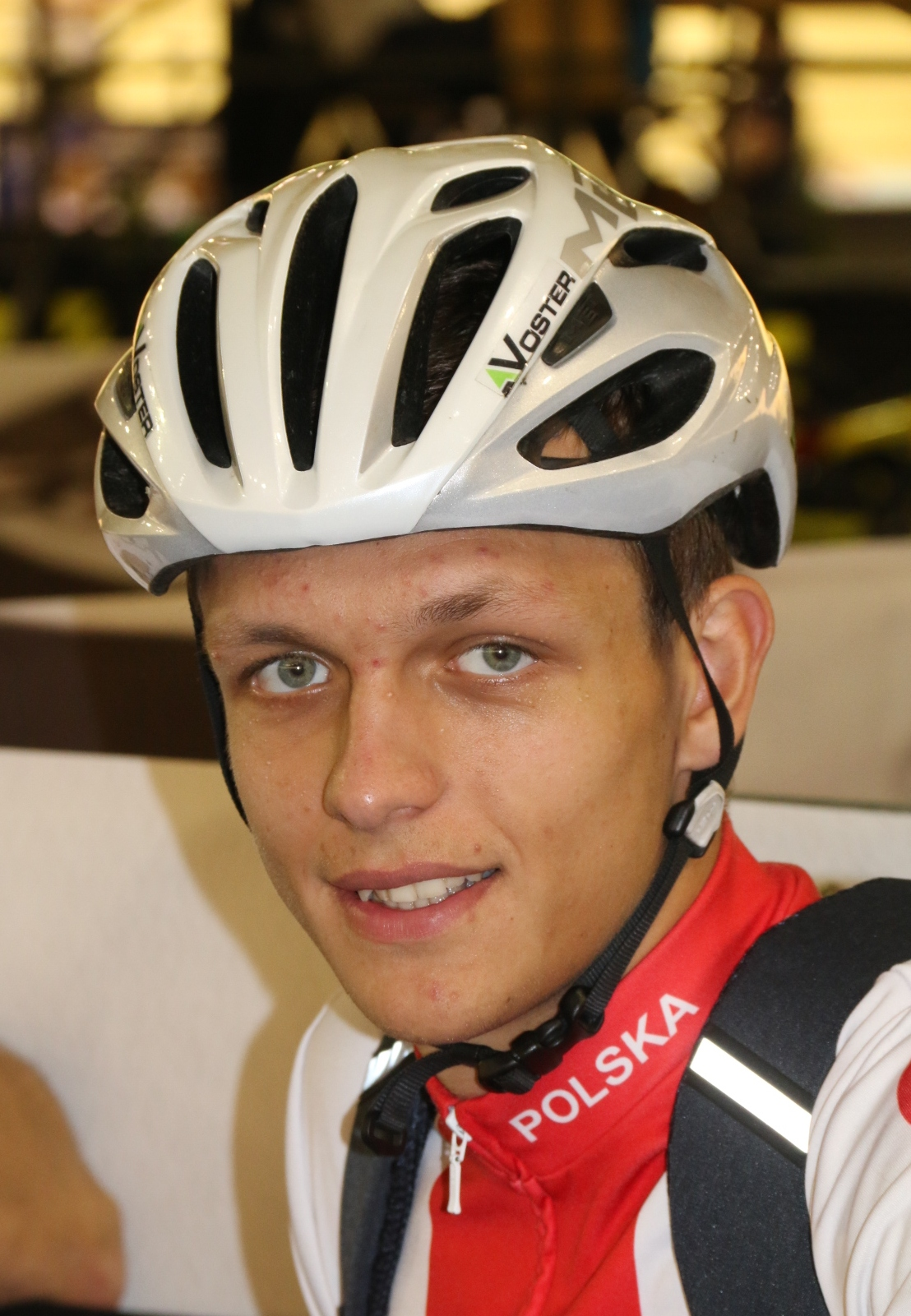
- Krawczyk in 2017

Personal information
- Full name: Szymon Krawczyk
- Born: 8 August 1998 (age 28) Jarocin, Poland
- Height: 1.89 m (6 ft 2 in)
- Weight: 79 kg (174 lb)

Cycling career
- Sport: Cycling
- Current team: Voster Team
- Disciplines: Track; Road
- Role: Rider

Professional teams
- 2017–2019: Voster Uniwheels Team
- 2020: CCC Development Team
- 2021–: Voster ATS Team
Medal record
Representing Poland
Men's track cycling
European Championships
Bronze medal – third place	2018 Glasgow	Elimination race

Szymon Krawczyk (born 8 August 1998) is a Polish racing cyclist, who currently rides for UCI Continental team Voster Team. He rode in the men's team pursuit event at the 2018 UCI Track Cycling World Championships.

== Major results ==
2015
1st Road race, National Junior Road Championships
1st Team pursuit, National Track Championships
UEC European Junior Track Championships

2nd Points race
3rd Team pursuit

3rd Overall La Coupe du Président de la Ville de Grudziądz

1st Young rider classification

2016
UEC European Junior Track Championships

1st Omnium
2nd Team pursuit

1st Points, UCI Junior Track World Championships
1st Road race, National Junior Road Championships
2nd Overall La Coupe du Président de la Ville de Grudziądz
2017
National Track Championships

2nd Madison
2nd Points race
3rd Individual pursuit
3rd Omnium

3rd Team pursuit, UEC European Under-23 Track Championships
2018
National Track Championships

1st Madison (with Damian Sławek)
1st Individual pursuit
2nd Scratch

3rd Elimination, UEC European Track Championships
2019
2nd Scratch, National Track Championships
6th GP Slovakia
10th Overall Dookoła Mazowsza
2020
1st Time trial, National Under-23 Road Championships
1st Scratch, National Track Championships
1st Stage 2 Giro del Friuli-Venezia Giulia
3rd Overall Tour of Romania

1st Young rider classification

5th Overall Dookoła Mazowsza
6th Overall Tour of Szeklerland
