= 2015–16 UCI Track Cycling World Cup =

Track cycling competition

2015–2016 UCI Track Cycling World Cup
- Twenty-fourth edition of the UCI Track Cycling World Cup

Details
- Dates: 30 October 2015 – 17 January 2016
- Location: Colombia, New Zealand and Hong Kong
- Races: 3

The 2015–16 UCI Track Cycling World Cup was a multi-race tournament over a track cycling season. It was the 24th series of the UCI Track Cycling World Cup organised by the UCI. The series ran from 30 October 2015 to 17 January 2016 and consisted of three rounds in Cali, Cambridge and Hong Kong.

== Series ==
This season of World Cup consisted of three rounds, in Cali (Colombia), Cambridge (New Zealand) and Hong Kong.

=== Cali, Colombia ===
The first round was hosted in Cali. Cali is the 3rd most populated city in Colombia and a regular host of the World Cup series, hosting the series for the thirteenth time this season. Unlike the other two rounds of this series, the racing was held on three full days between 30 October 2015 and 1 November 2015 at the Velódromo Alcides Nieto Patiño. The venue had hosted the UCI Track Cycling World Championships in 2014.

=== Cambridge, New Zealand ===
The second round was hosted in Cambridge, which is a small town in the North Island of New Zealand. It is 24 kilometers away from the closest city Hamilton. This round was held between 5 and 6 December 2015 at the Avantidrome. Avantidrome is an indoor velodrome built in 2014.

=== Hong Kong ===
The last round of this World Cup series was hosted in Hong Kong. This round was held between 16 and 17 January 2016 at the Hong Kong Velodrome. It was the second international event after the velodrome was built in 2013.

== Overall team standings ==
Overall team standings are calculated based on total number of points gained by the team's riders in each event. The top ten teams after the third and final round are listed below:

Rank	Team	Round 1	Round 2	Round 3	Total Points
1	Great Britain	1275.5	1119.5	1567.0	3962.0
2	Germany	1469.0	1385.0	956.0	3810.0
3	China	1118.0	905.0	1210.0	3233.0
4	Australia	854.5	1096.0	1123.5	3074.0
5	New Zealand	724.5	1297.5	941.0	2963.0
6	Russia	1151.0	739.5	922.0	2812.5
7	Canada	757.0	1081.0	956.0	2794.0
8	France	929.0	756.0	961.5	2646.5
9	Netherlands	977.0	893.0	667.0	2537.0
10	Poland	658.5	545.0	715.5	1919.0

== Results ==
=== Men ===
Event	Winner	Second	Third
Colombia, Cali | 30 October – 1 November 2015
Sprint Details (pdf)	Denis Dmitriev (RUS); 10.422/9.997	Jeffrey Hoogland (NED) +0.008/+0.044	Max Niederlag (GER); 10.467/10.380
Individual Pursuit Details (pdf)	Domenic Weinstein (GER); 4:20.069	Andrew Tennant (GBR); 4:22.095	Dmitri Sokolov (RUS); 4:22.141
Team Pursuit Details (pdf)	Russia; Alexander Serov; Sergey Shilov; Dmitry Sokolov; Kirill Sveshnikov; 4:01.064	Switzerland; Stefan Küng; Patrick Müller; Frank Pasche; Théry Schir; 4:01.972	Australia; Daniel Fitter; Jackson Law; Alexander Porter; Callum Scotson; 4:01.060
Team Sprint Details (pdf)	Germany; René Enders; Max Niederlag; Joachim Eilers; 43.095	Poland; Grzegorz Drejgier; Rafał Sarnecki; Mateusz Lipa; 43.748	Netherlands; Nils van 't Hoenderdaal; Jeffrey Hoogland; Hugo Haak; 43.106
Keirin Details (pdf)	Joachim Eilers (GER); 10.165	Matthew Glaetzer (AUS) +0.093	Edward Dawkins (NZL) +0.201
Points Race Details (pdf)	Cheung King Lok (HKG); 58 pts	Eloy Teruel (ESP); 55 pts	Edwin Ávila (COL); 52 pts
Madison Details (pdf)	Germany; Kersten Thiele; Leon Rohde; 6 pts	Spain; Sebastián Mora; Albert Torres; 4 pts	Switzerland; Stefan Küng; Théry Schir; 19 pts (1 lap down)
Omnium Details (pdf)	Viktor Manakov (RUS); 182 pts	Roger Kluge (GER); 178 pts	Elia Viviani (ITA); 173 pts
New Zealand, Cambridge | 4–6 December 2015
Sprint Details (pdf)	Matthew Glaetzer (AUS) (Team Jayco–AIS); 10.311/10.202	Max Niederlag (GER) +0.029/+0.625	Maximilian Levy (GER) (Team Erdgas.2012); 10.239/+0.006/10.500
Team Pursuit Details (pdf)	Australia; Jack Bobridge; Luke Davison; Alexander Edmondson; Michael Hepburn; 3:53.010	New Zealand; Cameron Karwowski; Pieter Bulling; Alex Frame; Regan Gough; 3:57.612	Germany; Maximilian Beyer; Leif Lampater; Theo Reinhardt; Kersten Thiele; 4:02.517
Team Sprint Details (pdf)	Germany; René Enders; Max Niederlag; Joachim Eilers; 43.130	New Zealand; Ethan Mitchell; Sam Webster; Edward Dawkins; 43.419	Team Jayco–AIS; Nathan Hart; Peter Lewis; Matthew Glaetzer; 43.733
Keirin Details (pdf)	Joachim Eilers (GER); 10.397	Maximilian Levy (GER) (Team Erdgas.2012) +0.002	Matthew Baranoski (USA) +0.090
Scratch Race Details (pdf)	Mark Stewart (GBR)	Brayan Sánchez (COL)	Roman Gladysh (UKR) (1 lap down)
Madison Details (pdf)	France; Morgan Kneisky; Benjamin Thomas; 24 pts	Switzerland; Silvan Dillier; Théry Schir; 24 pts	Great Britain; Germain Burton; Mark Stewart; 13 pts
Omnium Details (pdf)	Lasse Norman Hansen (DEN); 208 pts	Christopher Latham (GBR); 188 pts	Glenn O'Shea (AUS); 165 pts
Hong Kong | 16–17 January 2016
Sprint Details (pdf)	Patrick Constable (AUS); 10.247/10.411	Xu Chao (CHN) +0.982/+0.067	Jason Kenny (GBR); 10.503/10.579
Team Pursuit Details (pdf)	Australia; Sam Welsford; Miles Scotson; Alexander Porter; Rohan Wight; 3:57.461	Denmark; Niklas Larsen; Frederik Madsen; Casper Pedersen; Rasmus Pedersen; 4:00.894	Great Britain; Oliver Wood; Germain Burton; Kian Emadi; Christopher Latham; 3:59.706
Team Sprint Details (pdf)	Great Britain; Philip Hindes; Jason Kenny; Callum Skinner; 43.751	Poland; Maciej Bielecki; Kamil Kuczyński; Mateusz Lipa; 43.802	Russia; Pavel Yakushevskiy; Denis Dmitriev; Nikita Shurshin; 43.910
Keirin Details (pdf)	Matthijs Büchli (NED); 10.420	Hugo Barrette (CAN) +0.012	Im Chae-bin (KOR) +0.205
Scratch Race Details (pdf)	Benjamin Thomas (FRA)	Xavier Cañellas (ESP)	Jordan Parra (COL)
Points Race Details (pdf)	Benjamin Thomas (FRA); 33 pts	Julio Alberto Amores (ESP); 23 pts	Luke Mudgway (NZL); 21 pts
Omnium Details (pdf)	Thomas Boudat (FRA); 181 pts	Lasse Norman Hansen (DEN); 175 pts	Artyom Zakharov (KAZ); 172 pts

=== Women ===
Event	Winner	Second	Third
Colombia, Cali | 30 October – 1 November 2015
Sprint Details (pdf)	Zhong Tianshi (CHN); 11.296/11.424	Guo Shuang (CHN) (Giant-Max Success Sports Pro Cycling) +0.022/+0.009	Lee Wai Sze (HKG); 11.330/11.464
Team Pursuit Details (pdf)	Canada; Jasmin Glaesser; Allison Beveridge; Kirsti Lay; Stephanie Roorda; 4:20.139	United States; Sarah Hammer; Kelly Catlin; Jennifer Valente; Ruth Winder; 4:25.826	Great Britain; Katie Archibald; Elinor Barker; Ciara Horne; Joanna Rowsell; 4:26.662
Team Sprint Details (pdf)	China; Gong Jinjie; Zhong Tianshi; 32.311	Team Jayco–AIS; Anna Meares; Stephanie Morton; 32.588	RusVelo; Daria Shmeleva; Anastasiia Voinova; 32.605
Keirin Details (pdf)	Kristina Vogel (GER); 10.870	Guo Shuang (CHN) (Giant-Max Success Sports Pro Cycling) +0.095	Ekaterina Gnidenko (RUS) +0.244
Scratch Race Details (pdf)	Arlenis Sierra (CUB)	Lotte Kopecky (BEL)	Jennifer Valente (USA)
Omnium Details (pdf)	Laura Trott (GBR); 213 pts	Laurie Berthon (FRA); 160 pts	Sarah Hammer (USA); 153 pts
New Zealand, Cambridge | 4–6 December 2015
Sprint Details (pdf)	Kristina Vogel (GER); 11.475/11.503	Stephanie Morton (AUS) (Team Jayco–AIS) +0.199/+0.237	Simona Krupeckaitė (LTU); 11.316/+0.032/11.428
Team Pursuit Details (pdf)	Australia; Ashlee Ankudinoff; Georgia Baker; Amy Cure; Isabella King; 4:18.213	Canada; Allison Beveridge; Laura Brown; Jasmin Glaesser; Kirsti Lay; 4:18.267	New Zealand; Rushlee Buchanan; Lauren Ellis; Jaime Nielsen; Georgia Williams; 4:23.011
Team Sprint Details (pdf)	China; Gong Jinjie; Zhong Tianshi; 32.682	Team Jayco–AIS; Kaarle McCulloch; Stephanie Morton; 33.200	Netherlands; Laurine Van Riessen; Elis Ligtlee; 33.433
Keirin Details (pdf)	Guo Shuang (CHN) (Giant-Max Success Sports Pro Cycling); 11.122	Anna Meares (AUS) (Team Jayco–AIS)	Monique Sullivan (CAN) +0.458
Scratch Race Details (pdf)	Amy Cure (AUS)	Jolien D'Hoore (BEL)	Amalie Dideriksen (DEN)
Omnium Details (pdf)	Allison Beveridge (CAN); 201 pts	Annette Edmondson (AUS); 188 pts	Jolien D'Hoore (BEL); 182 pts
Hong Kong | 16–17 January 2016
Sprint Details (pdf)	Lin Junhong (CHN); 11.576/11.421	Lee Wai Sze (HKG) +0.006/+0.025	Anastasiia Voinova (RUS) (RusVelo); 11.591/11.676
Team Pursuit Details (pdf)	Canada; Jasmin Glaesser; Georgia Simmerling; Laura Brown; Stephanie Roorda; 4:19.737	Great Britain; Emily Nelson; Elinor Barker; Ciara Horne; Joanna Rowsell; 4:20.034	United States; Chloé Dygert; Kelly Catlin; Jennifer Valente; Ruth Winder; 4:21.412
Team Sprint Details (pdf)	RusVelo; Daria Shmeleva; Anastasiia Voinova; 33.035	Great Britain; Jessica Varnish; Katy Marchant; 33.625	Spain; Tania Calvo; Helena Casas; 33.541
Keirin Details (pdf)	Simona Krupeckaitė (LTU); 11.320	Stephanie Morton (AUS) (Team Jayco–AIS) +0.038	Lee Wai Sze (HKG) +0.056
Scratch Race Details (pdf)	Marina Shmayankova (BLR)	Laura Trott (GBR) (1 lap down)	Yang Qianyu (HKG) (1 lap down)
Points Race Details (pdf)	Jolien D'Hoore (BEL); 17 pts	Jasmin Glaesser (CAN); 13 pts	Emily Nelson (GBR); 11 pts
Omnium Details (pdf)	Laura Trott (GBR); 188 pts	Sarah Hammer (USA); 170 pts	Laurie Berthon (FRA); 166 pts
