= 2015 UCI Track Cycling World Championships – Women's team pursuit =

Women's team pursuit at the 2015 UCI Track Cycling World Championships
- Venue: Vélodrome de Saint-Quentin-en-Yvelines, Saint-Quentin-en-Yvelines
- Date: 18–19 February 2015
- Competitors: 64 from 16 nations
- Winning time: 4:13.683

Medalists
gold medal	Annette Edmondson; Ashlee Ankudinoff; Amy Cure; Melissa Hoskins	Australia
silver medal	Katie Archibald; Laura Trott; Elinor Barker; Joanna Rowsell	Great Britain
bronze medal	Allison Beveridge; Jasmin Glaesser; Kirsti Lay; Stephanie Roorda	Canada

The Women's team pursuit event of the 2015 UCI Track Cycling World Championships was held on 18–19 February 2015.

== Results ==
=== Qualifying ===
The qualifying was held at 14:45.

Rank	Name	Nation	Time	Notes
1	Annette Edmondson; Ashlee Ankudinoff; Amy Cure; Melissa Hoskins	Australia	4:18.135	Q
2	Katie Archibald; Laura Trott; Elinor Barker; Joanna Rowsell	Great Britain	4:18.207	Q
3	Allison Beveridge; Jasmin Glaesser; Kirsti Lay; Stephanie Roorda	Canada	4:20.699	Q
4	Lauren Ellis; Rushlee Buchanan; Jaime Nielsen; Georgia Williams	New Zealand	4:25.406	Q
5	Huang Dongyan; Jiang Wenwen; Jing Yali; Zhao Baofang	China	4:27.645	q
6	Sarah Hammer; Jennifer Valente; Lauren Tamayo; Ruth Winder	United States	4:28.302	q
7	Charlotte Becker; Stephanie Pohl; Mieke Kröger; Gudrun Stock	Germany	4:31.078	q
8	Simona Frapporti; Beatrice Bartelloni; Tatiana Guderzo; Silvia Valsecchi	Italy	4:32.198	q
9	Tamara Balabolina; Gulnaz Badykova; Anastasia Chulkova; Irina Molicheva	Russia	4:32.875	
10	Katarzyna Pawłowska; Małgorzata Wojtyra; Eugenia Bujak; Natalia Rutkowska	Poland	4:34.620	
11	Ina Savenka; Volha Antonava; Polina Pivovarova; Marina Shmayankova	Belarus	4:35.495	
12	Sakura Tsukagoshi; Minami Uwano; Kanako Kase; Yoko Kojima	Japan	4:35.929	
13	Marlies Mejías; Yudelmis Domínguez; Yoanka González; Yumari González	Cuba	4:36.100	
14	Pang Yao; Yang Qianyu; Leung Bo Yee; Meng Zhao Juan	Hong Kong	4:37.798	
15	Soline Lamboley; Élise Delzenne; Eugénie Duval; Pascale Jeuland	France	4:37.808	
16	Caroline Ryan; Lydia Boylan; Lauren Creamer; Josie Knight	Ireland	4:40.388	

=== First round ===
The first round was held at 16:00.

Rank	Name	Nation	Time
1 vs. 4
1	Annette Edmondson; Ashlee Ankudinoff; Amy Cure; Melissa Hoskins	Australia	4:17.396
2	Lauren Ellis; Rushlee Buchanan; Jaime Nielsen; Georgia Williams	New Zealand	4:22.947
2 vs. 3
1	Katie Archibald; Laura Trott; Elinor Barker; Joanna Rowsell	Great Britain	4:16.975
2	Allison Beveridge; Jasmin Glaesser; Kirsti Lay; Stephanie Roorda	Canada	4:17.795
5 vs. 8
1	Huang Dongyan; Jiang Wenwen; Jing Yali; Zhao Baofang	China	4:24.260
2	Simona Frapporti; Beatrice Bartelloni; Tatiana Guderzo; Silvia Valsecchi	Italy	4:28.924
6 vs. 7
1	Sarah Hammer; Jennifer Valente; Lauren Tamayo; Ruth Winder	United States	4:24.136
2	Charlotte Becker; Stephanie Pohl; Mieke Kröger; Gudrun Stock	Germany	4:29.914

=== Finals ===
The finals were started at 20:20.

Rank	Name	Nation	Time
Gold medal race
1st place, gold medalist(s)	Annette Edmondson; Ashlee Ankudinoff; Amy Cure; Melissa Hoskins	Australia	4:13.683
2nd place, silver medalist(s)	Katie Archibald; Laura Trott; Elinor Barker; Joanna Rowsell	Great Britain	4:16.606
Bronze medal race
3rd place, bronze medalist(s)	Allison Beveridge; Jasmin Glaesser; Kirsti Lay; Stephanie Roorda	Canada	4:17.824
4	Lauren Ellis; Rushlee Buchanan; Jaime Nielsen; Georgia Williams	New Zealand	4:22.673
Fifth place race
5	Sarah Hammer; Jennifer Valente; Lauren Tamayo; Ruth Winder	United States	4:25.644
6	Huang Dongyan; Jiang Wenwen; Jing Yali; Zhao Baofang	China	4:28.548
Seventh place race
7	Charlotte Becker; Stephanie Pohl; Mieke Kröger; Gudrun Stock	Germany	4:30.026
8	Simona Frapporti; Beatrice Bartelloni; Tatiana Guderzo; Silvia Valsecchi	Italy	4:31.431
