= World record progression track cycling – Women's individual pursuit =

The following is an overview of the progression of the World track cycling record of the women's 3000m and 4000m individual pursuit as recognised by the Union Cycliste Internationale (UCI).

== Progression ==
=== Amateurs (1964–1992) ===
Time	Cyclist	Location	Track	Date
4'29"20	S. Killingbeck (GBR)	London (GBR), Herne Hill	open air	25 April 1964
4'16"60	Beryl Burton (GBR)	Nottingham (GBR)	open air	30 May 1964
4'14"90	Beryl Burton (GBR)	Newcastle (GBR)	open air	18 July 1964
4'09"30	Morena Tartagni (ITA)	Rome (ITA), Olympic Velodrome	open air	28 October 1968
4'01"70	Raissa Obodowskaja (URS)	Brno (TCH)	open air	20 August 1969
3'52"50	Tamara Garkouchina (URS)	Montreal (CAN), Olympic Velodrome	open air	18 August 1974
3'58"908	Jeannie Longo (FRA)	Paris (FRA), Palais Omnisport Bercy	indoor	5 February 1984
3'58"025	Nadejda Kibardina (URS)	Moscow (URS)	indoor	21 August 1984
3'49"780	Rebecca Twigg (USA)	Barcelona (ESP)	open air	29 August 1984
3'55"835	Erika Salumäe (URS)	Moscow (URS)	indoor	8 September 1984
3'49"646	Jeannie Longo (FRA)	Paris (FRA), Palais Omnisport Bercy	indoor	17 November 1984
3'45"386	Jeannie Longo (FRA)	Paris (FRA), Palais Omnisport Bercy	indoor	12 November 1986
3'43"490	Jeannie Longo (FRA)	Paris (FRA), Palais Omnisport Bercy	indoor	14 November 1986
3'41"640	Jeannie Longo (FRA)	Mexico (MEX)	open air	25 September 1989
3'38"190	Jeannie Longo (FRA)	Mexico (MEX)	open air	5 October 1989
3'41"290	Jeannie Longo (FRA)	Grenoble (FRA), Palais Des Sports	indoor	4 November 1991
3'41"061	Jeannie Longo (FRA)	Bordeaux (FRA)	indoor	25 May 1992

=== Open (from 1993) ===
==== 3000m ====
Time	Cyclist	Location	Track	Date	Meet	Ref
3:37.347	Rebecca Twigg (USA)	Hamar (NOR)	Indoor	20 August 1993	World Championships	
3:36.227	Marion Clignet (FRA)	Bogotá (COL)	Open air	29 September 1995	World Championships	
3:36.081	Rebecca Twigg (USA)	Bogotá (COL)	Open air	30 September 1995	World Championships	
3:31.924	Antonella Bellutti (ITA)	Cali (COL)	Open air	6 April 1996		
3:30.974	Marion Clignet (FRA)	Manchester (GBR)	Indoor	31 August 1996	World Championships	
3:30.816	Leontien Zijlaard (NED)	Sydney (AUS)	Indoor	17 September 2000	Olympic Games	
3:30.604	Sarah Ulmer (NZL)	Melbourne (AUS)	Indoor	27 May 2004	World Championships	
3:26.400	Sarah Ulmer (NZL)	Athens (GRE)	Indoor	21 August 2004	Olympic Games	
3:24.537	Sarah Ulmer (NZL)	Athens (GRE)	Indoor	22 August 2004	Olympic Games	
3:22.269	Sarah Hammer (USA)	Aguascalientes (MEX)	Indoor	11 May 2010	Pan American Championships	
3:20.072	Chloé Dygert (USA)	Apeldoorn (NED)	Indoor	3 March 2018	World Championships	
3:20.060	Chloé Dygert (USA)	Apeldoorn (NED)	Indoor	3 March 2018	World Championships	
3:17.283	Chloé Dygert (USA)	Berlin (GER)	Indoor	29 February 2020	World Championships	
3:16.937	Chloé Dygert (USA)	Berlin (GER)	Indoor	29 February 2020	World Championships	
3:15.663	Chloé Dygert (USA)	Ballerup (DEN)	Indoor	19 October 2024	World Championships	

==== 4000m ====
Time	Cyclist	Location	Track	Date	Meet	Ref
4:42.730	Marion Borras (FRA)	Loudéac (FRA)	Indoor	4 January 2025	French Championships	
4:42.145	Hélène Hesters (BEL)	Heusden-Zolder (BEL)	Indoor	25 January 2025	Belgian Championships	
4:31.446	Bryony Botha (NZL)	Brisbane (AUS)	Indoor	12 February 2025	Oceania Championships	
4:30.752	Bryony Botha (NZL)	Brisbane (AUS)	Indoor	12 February 2025	Oceania Championships	
4:28.306	Anna Morris (GBR)	Heusden-Zolder (BEL)	Indoor	15 February 2025	European Championships	
4:25.874	Anna Morris (GBR)	Heusden-Zolder (BEL)	Indoor	15 February 2025	European Championships	
4:24.060	Anna Morris (GBR)	Manchester (GBR)	Indoor	22 February 2025	British Championships	
4:23.642	Vittoria Bussi (ITA)	Aguascalientes (MEX)	Indoor	16 May 2025		
4:19.461	Josie Knight (GBR)	Konya (TUR)	Indoor	4 February 2026	European Championships	
