= 2014 UCI Track Cycling World Championships – Women's team pursuit =

The Women's team sprint at the 2014 UCI Track Cycling World Championships was held on 27 February 2014. 11 nations participated in the contest. After all teams have contested qualifying, the fastest two squads advanced to the final and raced for the gold medal, while the teams ranked third and fourth, raced for the bronze medal.

== Medalists ==
Gold	Great Britain; Laura Trott; Katie Archibald; Elinor Barker; Joanna Rowsell
Silver	Canada; Laura Brown; Jasmin Glaesser; Allison Beveridge; Stephanie Roorda
Bronze	Australia; Annette Edmondson; Amy Cure; Melissa Hoskins; Isabella King

== Results ==
=== Qualifying ===
The qualifying was started at 13:30.

Rank	Name	Nation	Time	Notes
1	Laura Trott; Katie Archibald; Elinor Barker; Joanna Rowsell	Great Britain	4:28.597	Q
2	Laura Brown; Jasmin Glaesser; Allison Beveridge; Stephanie Roorda	Canada	4:30.721	Q
3	Annette Edmondson; Amy Cure; Melissa Hoskins; Isabella King	Australia	4:31.504	Q
4	Katarzyna Pawłowska; Małgorzata Wojtyra; Eugenia Bujak; Edyta Jasińska	Poland	4:37.786	Q
5	Cari Higgins; Lauren Tamayo; Jennifer Valente; Ruth Winder	United States	4:39.026	
6	Huang Dong Yan; Jing Yali; Ma Shanshan; Zhao Baofang	China	4:39.949	
7	Gulnaz Badykova; Lidia Malakhova; Lidia Molicheva; Evgenia Romanyuta	Russia	4:41.765	
8	Stephanie Pohl; Mieke Kröger; Lisa Küllmer; Gudrun Stock	Germany	4:43.279	
9	Milena Salcedo; Valentina Paniagua; Jessica Parra; Lorena Vargas	Colombia	4:49.772	
10	Jolien D'Hoore; Kelly Druyts; Els Belmans; Lotte Kopecky	Belgium	4:49.856	
11	Simona Frapporti; Elena Cecchini; Maria Giulia Confalonieri; Marta Tagliaferro	Italy	4:54.105	

=== Finals ===
The finals were started at 21:05.

Rank	Name	Nation	Time
Gold Medal Race
1st place, gold medalist(s)	Laura Trott; Katie Archibald; Elinor Barker; Joanna Rowsell	Great Britain	4:23.407
2nd place, silver medalist(s)	Laura Brown; Jasmin Glaesser; Allison Beveridge; Stephanie Roorda	Canada	4:24.696
Bronze Medal Race
3rd place, bronze medalist(s)	Annette Edmondson; Amy Cure; Melissa Hoskins; Isabella King	Australia	
4	Katarzyna Pawłowska; Małgorzata Wojtyra; Eugenia Bujak; Edyta Jasińska	Poland	OVL
