= 2013–14 UCI Track Cycling World Cup =

International track cycling competition

2013–2014 UCI Track Cycling World Cup
- Twenty-second edition of the UCI Track Cycling World Cup
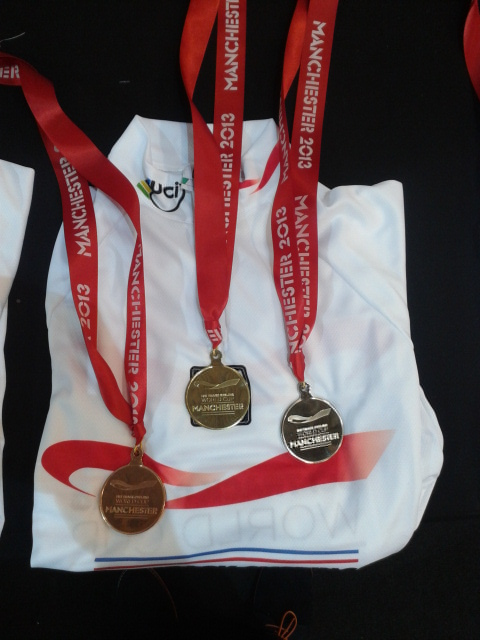
- World Cup medals and jersey

Details
- Dates: 1 November 2013 – 19 January 2014
- Location: United Kingdom and Mexico
- Races: 3

The 2013–2014 UCI Track Cycling World Cup was a multi race tournament over a track cycling season. It was the twenty-second series of the UCI Track Cycling World Cup organised by the Union Cycliste Internationale. The series ran from 1 November 2013 to 19 January 2014 and consisted of three rounds in Manchester, Aguascalientes and Guadalajara.

== Series ==
The 2013–2014 UCI Track Cycling World Cup consisted of three rounds, in Manchester (United Kingdom), Aguascalientes (Mexico) and Guadalajara (Mexico).

=== Manchester, United Kingdom ===
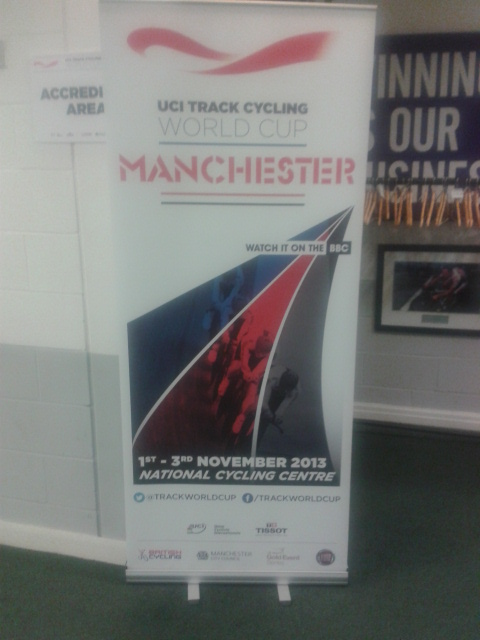
Banner of the World Cup in Manchester

The first round of the World Cup was hosted in Manchester. Manchester has hosted the World Cup on eight occasions. This round was held between 1 and 3 November 2013 at the Manchester Velodrome.

=== Aguascalientes, Mexico ===
The second round of the World Cup was hosted in Aguascalientes. This round was held between 5 and 7 December 2013 at the Aguascalientes Bicentenary Velodrome.

=== Guadalajara, Mexico ===
The third round of the World Cup will be hosted in Guadalajara. This round was held between 17 and 19 January 2014 at the Velódromo Panamericano.

== Overall team standings ==
Overall team standings are calculated based on total number of points gained by the team's riders in each event. The top ten teams after the third and final round are listed below:

Rank	Team	Round 1	Round 2	Round 3	Total Points
1	Great Britain	2342.0	2396.5	1458.0	6196.5
2	Australia	1807.5	2062.0	1701.5	5571.0
3	Russia	1647.5	1373.0	1733.0	4753.5
4	Germany	1556.1	1710.0	1454.5	4720.6
5	Spain	1211.0	1174.0	1372.0	3757.0
6	France	1192.0	1017.0	1391.5	3600.5
7	Netherlands	991.0	988.5	1208.0	3187.5
8	New Zealand	724.5	778.0	1156.0	2658.5
9	Italy	1121.0	676.0	780.0	2577.0
10	Poland	905.0	696.0	946.5	2547.5

== Results ==
=== Men ===
Event	Winner	Second	Third
Great Britain, Manchester – 1–3 November 2013
Sprint Details (PDF)	Robert Förstemann (GER)	Njisane Phillip (TTO)	Shane Perkins (AUS)
Individual Pursuit Details (PDF)	Marco Coledan (ITA); 4:22.641	Alexander Serov (RUS); 4:23.296	Sebastián Mora (ESP); 4:25.022
Team Pursuit Details (PDF)	Great Britain; Ed Clancy; Steven Burke; Andy Tennant; Owain Doull; 3:58.654	Australia; Luke Davison; Alex Edmondson; Mitchell Mulhern; Miles Scotson; 3:59.293	Denmark; Lasse Norman Hansen; Matthias Muller; Rasmus Christian Quaade; Alex Rasmussen; 4:01.934
Team Sprint Details (PDF)	Germany; René Enders; Robert Förstemann; Max Niederlag; 43.293	Russia; Denis Dmitriev; Andrey Kubeev; Pavel Yakushevskiy; 43.844	Great Britain; Philip Hindes; Jason Kenny; Matthew Crampton; Kian Emadi(q); 43.972
Keirin Details (PDF)	François Pervis (FRA)	Maximilian Levy (GER) (Team Erdgas 2012)	Hersony Canelón (VEN)
Scratch Race Details (PDF)	Andreas Müller (AUT)	Elia Viviani (ITA)	Jonathan Mould (GBR) (Team USN)
Points Race Details (PDF)	Martyn Irvine (IRL); 20 pts	Lasse Norman Hansen (DEN); 17 pts	Elia Viviani (ITA); 13 pts
Omnium Details (PDF)	Jasper De Buyst (BEL); 17 pts	Tim Veldt (NED); 18 pts	Aaron Gate (NZL); 24 pts
Mexico, Aguascalientes – 5–7 December 2013
Sprint Details (PDF)	Matthew Glaetzer (AUS)	Jason Kenny (GBR)	Pavel Kelemen (CZE)
Kilo Time Trial Details (PDF)	François Pervis (FRA); 56.303 WR	Maximilian Levy (GER) (Team Erdgas 2012); 57.949	Joachim Eilers (GER); 57.980
Team Pursuit Details (PDF)	Australia; Glenn O'Shea; Alex Edmondson; Mitchell Mulhern; Alexander Morgan; 3:55.841	Denmark; Lasse Norman Hansen; Casper Folsach; Rasmus Christian Quaade; Alex Rasmussen; 3:58.275	Great Britain; Sam Harrison; Steven Burke; Jonathan Dibben; Owain Doull; 3:59.009
Team Sprint Details (PDF)	Germany; René Enders; Robert Förstemann; Joachim Eilers; 42.117 (Note: Germany set a World Record in qualifying of 41.871. The time of 42.117 was also under the previous record of 42.600s.)	Great Britain; Philip Hindes; Jason Kenny; Matthew Crampton; Kian Emadi(q); 43.325	Australia; Nathan Hart; Shane Perkins; Matthew Glaetzer; 43.201
Keirin Details (PDF)	Matthew Crampton (GBR)	Tobias Wachter (GER)	Shane Perkins (AUS)
Scratch Race Details (PDF)	Owain Doull (GBR)	King Lok Cheung (HKG)	Roman Lutsyshyn (UKR)
Madison Details (PDF)	Spain; David Muntaner; Albert Torres	Belgium; Jasper De Buyst; Kenny De Ketele	Russia; Artur Ershov; Alexander Serov
Omnium Details (PDF)	Luke Davison (AUS); 30 pts	Jasper De Buyst (BEL); 34 pts	Artyom Zakharov (KAZ); 36 pts
Mexico, Guadalajara – 17–19 January 2014
Sprint Details (PDF)	Hugo Haak (NED)	Max Niederlag (GER)	Sam Webster (NZL)
Kilo Time Trial Details (PDF)	Scott Sunderland (AUS); 59.675	Krzysztof Maksel (POL); 59.820	Hugo Haak (NED); 59.976
Individual Pursuit Details (PDF)	Jenning Huizenga (NED); 4:21.931	Mauro Agostini (ARG); 4:25.708	Stefan Küng (SUI); 4:19.542
Team Pursuit Details (PDF)	Australia; Tirian McManus; Joshua Harrison; Callum Scotson; Scott Sunderland; 4:01.494	Switzerland; Théry Schir; Stefan Küng; Loïc Perizzolo; Cyrille Thièry; 4:06.312	Germany; Theo Reinhardt; Maximilian Beyer; Henning Bommel; Nils Schomber caught opponents
Team Sprint Details (PDF)	Netherlands; Nils van 't Hoenderdaal; Hugo Haak; Matthijs Büchli; 43.311	Germany; Erik Balzer; Max Niederlag; Joachim Eilers; 43.465	Great Britain; John Paul; Callum Skinner; Lewis Oliva; 43.854
Keirin Details (PDF)	Matthijs Büchli (NED)	Santiago Ramírez (COL)	Lewis Oliva (GBR)
Points Race Details (PDF)	Kirill Sveshnikov (RUS); 40 pts	Thomas Scully (NZL); 38 pts	Roman Lutsyshyn (UKR); 34 pts
Madison Details (PDF)	New Zealand; Patrick Bevin; Thomas Scully	Belgium; Jasper De Buyst; Kenny De Ketele	Switzerland; Stefan Küng; Théry Schir
Omnium Details (PDF)	Tirian McManus (AUS); 26 pts	Jasper De Buyst (BEL); 27 pts	Thomas Boudet (FRA); 30 pts

=== Women ===
Event	Winner	Second	Third
Great Britain, Manchester – 1–3 November 2013
Sprint Details (PDF)	Kristina Vogel (GER)	Wai Sze Lee (HKG)	Becky James (GBR)
Individual Pursuit Details (PDF)	Joanna Rowsell (GBR); 3:34.904	Rebecca Wiasak (AUS); 3:36.830	Katie Archibald (GBR) (Scottish Cycling Braveheart.com); 3:37.093
Team Pursuit Details (PDF)	Great Britain; Laura Trott; Elinor Barker; Joanna Rowsell; Dani King; 4:19.604 WR	Canada; Gillian Carleton; Laura Brown; Jasmin Glaesser; Stephanie Roorda; 4:27.083	Australia; Annette Edmondson; Georgia Baker; Rebecca Wiasak; Elissa Wundersitz; 4:30.831
Team Sprint Details (PDF)	Germany; Miriam Welte; Kristina Vogel; 32.788	Great Britain; Victoria Williamson; Becky James; 33.635	Max Success Pro Cycling; Junhong Lin; Tianshi Zhong; 33.372
Keirin Details (PDF)	Kristina Vogel (GER)	Becky James (GBR)	Sandie Clair (FRA)
Scratch Race Details (PDF)	Małgorzata Wojtyra (POL)	Katie Archibald (GBR) (Scottish Cycling Braveheart.com)	Tetyana Klimchenko (UKR)
Points Race Details (PDF)	Laura Brown (CAN); 29 pts	Elizabeth Newell (USA); 26 pts	Jamie Wong (HKG); 26 pts
Omnium Details (PDF)	Laura Trott (GBR); 19 pts	Gillian Carleton (CAN); 24 pts	Laurie Berthon (FRA); 26 pts
Mexico, Aguascalientes – 5–7 December 2013
Sprint Details (PDF)	Kristina Vogel (GER)	Anna Meares (AUS)	Wai Sze Lee (HKG)
500m Time Trial Details (PDF)	Anna Meares (AUS); 32.836 WR	Miriam Welte (GER); 33.062	Wai Sze Lee (HKG); 33.296
Individual Pursuit Details (PDF)	Rebecca Wiasak (AUS); 3:28.884	Elinor Barker (GBR); 3:31.070	Caroline Ryan (IRL); 3:34.257
Team Pursuit Details (PDF)	Great Britain; Katie Archibald; Elinor Barker; Joanna Rowsell; Dani King; 4:16.552 WR	Canada; Gillian Carleton; Laura Brown; Jasmin Glaesser; Stephanie Roorda; 4:23.172	Australia; Rebecca Wiasak; Melissa Hoskins; Amy Cure; Isabella King; 4:22.533
Team Sprint Details (PDF)	Germany; Miriam Welte; Kristina Vogel; 32.212	Great Britain; Jess Varnish; Becky James; 32.602	Russia; Yelena Brezhniva; Anastasiya Voynova; 32.579
Keirin Details (PDF)	Kristina Vogel (GER)	Wai Sze Lee (HKG)	Becky James (GBR)
Points Race Details (PDF)	Stephanie Pohl (GER); 20 pts	Jasmin Glaesser (CAN); 13 pts	Jarmila Machačová (CZE); 12 pts
Omnium Details (PDF)	Sarah Hammer (USA); 19 pts	Laura Trott (GBR); 26 pts	Jolien D'Hoore (BEL); 27 pts
Mexico, Guadalajara – 17–19 January 2014
Sprint Details (PDF)	Junhong Lin (CHN) (Max Success Pro Cycling)	Tianshi Zhong (CHN) (Max Success Pro Cycling)	Wai Sze Lee (HKG)
500m Time Trial Details (PDF)	Anastasiia Voinova (RUS); 33.645	Miriam Welte (GER); 33.736	Wai Sze Lee (HKG); 33.928
Team Pursuit Details (PDF)	Canada; Allison Beveridge; Laura Brown; Jasmin Glaesser; Stephanie Roorda caught opponents	United States; Jennifer Valente; Cari Higgins; Lauren Tamayo; Jade Wilcoxson overtaken	Australia; Isabella King; Georgia Baker; Rebecca Wiasak; Elissa Wundersitz; 4:30.668
Team Sprint Details (PDF)	Max Success Pro Cycling; Junhong Lin; Tianshi Zhong; 33.016	Russia; Anastasiia Voinova; Ekaterina Gnidenko; 33.269	Great Britain; Victoria Williamson; Dannielle Khan; 33.569
Keirin Details (PDF)	Wai Sze Lee (HKG)	Fatehah Mustapa (MYS) (YSD Track Team)	Sandie Clair (FRA)
Scratch Race Details (PDF)	Xiao Juan Diao (HKG)	Milena Salcedo (COL)	Evgenia Romanyuta (RUS)
Omnium Details (PDF)	Katarzyna Pawłowska (POL); 20 pts	Isabella King (AUS); 21 pts	Laurie Berthon (FRA); 25 pts
