= Cycling at the 2015 Pan American Games – Women's road time trial =

Women's road time trial at the 2015 Pan American Games
- Venue: Milton Time Trial Course
- Dates: July 22
- Competitors: 15 from 10 nations
- Winning time: 26:25.58

Medalists
Gold medal	Kelly Catlin	United States
Silver medal	Jasmin Glaesser	Canada
Bronze medal	Evelyn García	El Salvador

The women's road time trial competition of the cycling events at the 2015 Pan American Games was held on July 22 at the Milton Time Trial Course.

== Schedule ==
All times are Eastern Standard Time (UTC−3).

Date	Time	Round
July 22, 2015	11:05	Final

== Results ==
Rank	Rider	Nation	Time
1st place, gold medalist(s)	Kelly Catlin	United States	26:25.58
2nd place, silver medalist(s)	Jasmin Glaesser	Canada	27:01.31
3rd place, bronze medalist(s)	Evelyn García	El Salvador	27:20.24
4	Laura Brown	Canada	27:23.32
5	Ana Paula Polegatch	Brazil	27:53.39
6	Íngrid Drexel	Mexico	28:13.14
7	Jennifer Cesar	Venezuela	28:34.50
8	Camila Valbuena	Colombia	28:54.44
9	Clemilda Fernandes	Brazil	29:21.36
10	Leidimar Suarez Medina	Venezuela	29:23.32
11	Cristina Irma Greve	Argentina	29:42.16
12	Tamiko Butler	Antigua and Barbuda	30:19.17
13	Mariela Delgado	Argentina	30:42.37
	Zoenique Williams	Bermuda	DNS
	María Luisa Calle	Colombia	DNS
