= 2017 UCI Track Cycling World Championships – Women's individual pursuit =

Women's individual pursuit at the 2017 UCI Track Cycling World Championships
- Venue: Hong Kong Velodrome
- Location: Hong Kong
- Dates: 15 April
- Competitors: 24 from 16 nations
- Winning time: 3:24.641

Medalists
gold medal	Chloé Dygert	United States
silver medal	Ashlee Ankudinoff	Australia
bronze medal	Kelly Catlin	United States

The Women's individual pursuit competition at the 2017 World Championships was held on 15 April 2017.

== Results ==
=== Qualifying ===
The first two racers raced for gold, the third and fourth fastest riders raced for the bronze medal.

Rank	Name	Nation	Time	Behind	Notes
1	Chloé Dygert	United States	3:22.920		Q, CR
2	Ashlee Ankudinoff	Australia	3:29.554	+6.634	Q
3	Rebecca Wiasak	Australia	3:30.938	+8.018	q
4	Kelly Catlin	United States	3:31.073	+8.153	q
5	Katie Archibald	Great Britain	3:31.331	+8.411	
6	Jaime Nielsen	New Zealand	3:31.653	+8.733	
7	Kirsti Lay	Canada	3:32.936	+10.016	
8	Silvia Valsecchi	Italy	3:33.088	+10.168	
9	Gudrun Stock	Germany	3:34.325	+11.405	
10	Annie Foreman-Mackey	Canada	3:34.955	+12.035	
11	Justyna Kaczkowska	Poland	3:34.958	+12.038	
12	Eleanor Dickinson	Great Britain	3:34.982	+12.062	
13	Marion Borras	France	3:36.194	+13.274	
14	Kirstie James	New Zealand	3:36.250	+13.330	
15	Francesca Pattaro	Italy	3:37.531	+14.611	
16	Élise Delzenne	France	3:38.744	+15.824	
17	Anna Turvey	Ireland	3:40.484	+17.564	
18	Polina Pivovarova	Belarus	3:41.497	+18.577	
19	Gloria Rodríguez	Spain	3:43.369	+20.449	
20	Annelies Dom	Belgium	3:44.903	+21.983	
21	Yumi Kajihara	Japan	3:47.356	+24.436	
22	Yang Qianyu	Hong Kong	3:48.449	+25.529	
23	Aušrinė Trebaitė	Lithuania	3:56.001	+33.081	
24	Daria Pikulik	Poland	4:09.892	+46.972	

=== Finals ===
The finals were started at 21:01.

Rank	Name	Nation	Time	Behind
Gold Medal Race
1st place, gold medalist(s)	Chloé Dygert	United States	3:24.641	
2nd place, silver medalist(s)	Ashlee Ankudinoff	Australia	3:31.784	+7.143
Bronze Medal Race
3rd place, bronze medalist(s)	Kelly Catlin	United States	3:30.365	
4	Rebecca Wiasak	Australia	3:31.173	+0.788
