= Jasmin Duehring =

Canadian cyclist

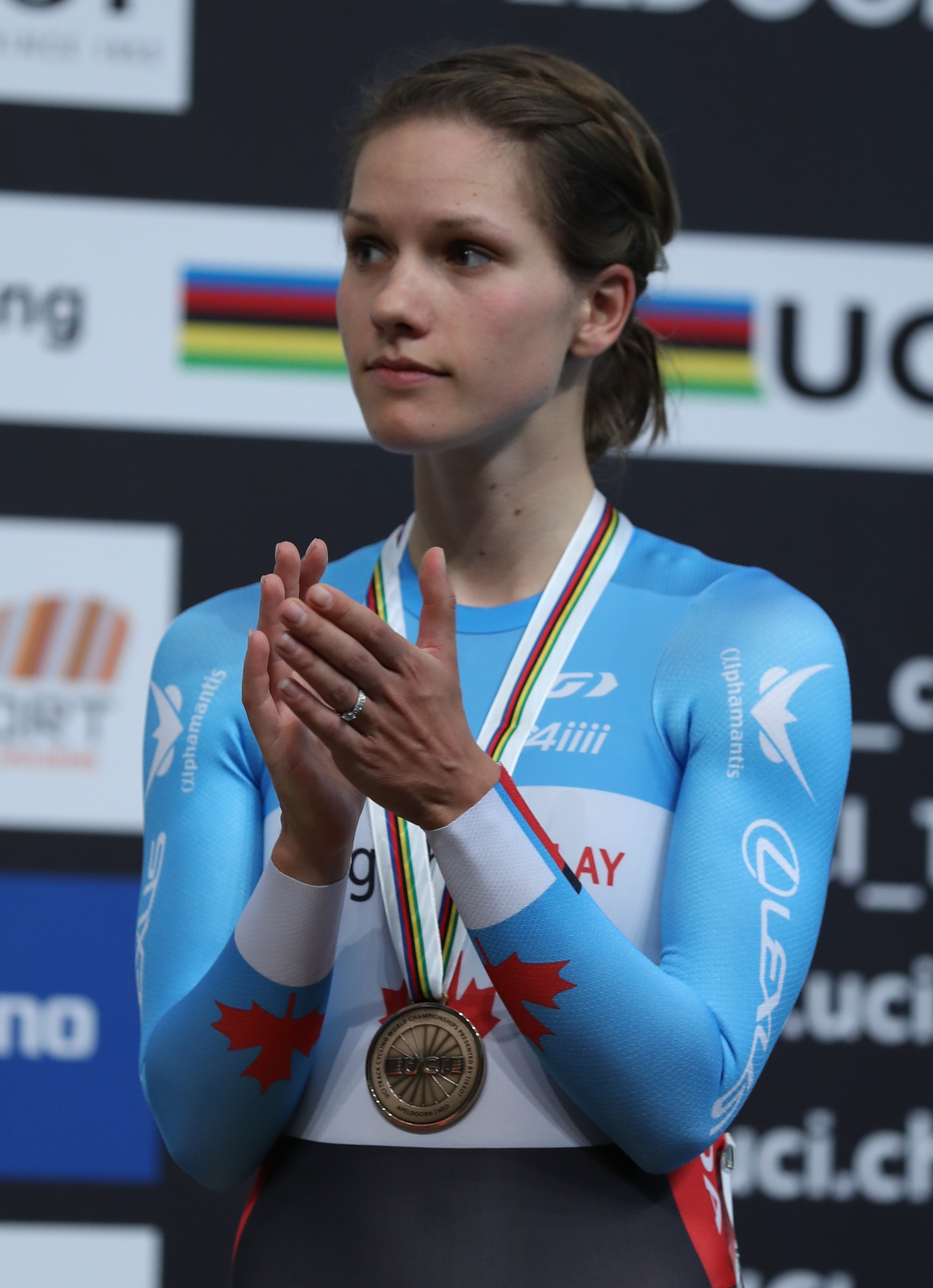
- Duehring at the 2018 UCI Track Cycling World Championships.

Personal information
- Full name: Jasmin Duehring
- Born: Jasmin Glaesser; July 8, 1992 (age 34) Paderborn, Germany
- Height: 167 cm (5 ft 6 in)
- Weight: 58 kg (128 lb)

Cycling career
- Sport: Cycling
- Current team: Virginia's Blue Ridge–Twenty28
- Disciplines: Road; Track
- Role: Rider
- Rider type: Time trialist (road); Endurance (track)

Amateur teams
- 2012: Colavita–espnW
- 2020–: Twenty20 Pro Cycling

Professional teams
- 2013–2014: Team TIBCO–To The Top
- 2015: Optum–KBS
- 2016: Rally Cycling
- 2017–2019: Sho-Air Twenty20
Medal record
Representing Canada
Women's track cycling
Olympic Games
Bronze medal – third place	2012 London	Team pursuit
Bronze medal – third place	2016 Rio de Janeiro	Team pursuit
World Championships
Silver medal – second place	2012 Melbourne	Points race
Silver medal – second place	2014 Cali	Team pursuit
Silver medal – second place	2016 London	Team pursuit
Silver medal – second place	2016 London	Points race
Bronze medal – third place	2012 Melbourne	Team pursuit
Bronze medal – third place	2013 Minsk	Team pursuit
Bronze medal – third place	2014 Cali	Points race
Bronze medal – third place	2015 Yvelines	Team pursuit
Bronze medal – third place	2018 Apeldoorn	Points race
Pan American Games
Gold medal – first place	2011 Guadalajara	Team pursuit
Gold medal – first place	2015 Toronto	Team pursuit
Silver medal – second place	2015 Toronto	Omnium
Pan American Championships
Gold medal – first place	2016 Aguascalientes	Team pursuit
Gold medal – first place	2016 Aguascalientes	Points race
Bronze medal – third place	2016 Aguascalientes	Individual pursuit
Women's road cycling
Pan American Games
Gold medal – first place	2015 Toronto	Road race
Silver medal – second place	2015 Toronto	Time trial

Jasmin Duehring (née Glaesser; born July 8, 1992) is a German-born Canadian cyclist, who currently rides for American amateur team Virginia's Blue Ridge–Twenty28. Duehring was part of the Canadian team that won bronze medals at the 2012 Summer Olympics and the 2016 Summer Olympics in the women's team pursuit. She was also part of the team that won gold at the 2011 Pan American Games in the team pursuit.

== Career ==
Duehring took up cycling in 2009 when seeking a lower-impact sport after suffering hip injuries as a runner whilst at Terry Fox Secondary School. Glaesser also participated in ballet and figure skating whilst growing up.

Her first competition for Canada was at the 2011 Pan American Games where she won gold for her new nation. Duehring then appeared for Canada at the 2012 UCI Track Cycling World Championships, there she won a silver in the points race before adding a bronze as a member of the team pursuit. She built onto this the next season, where she finished in preparation for the Olympics second in the team pursuit at the Track Cycling World Cup in London in February 2012 and won bronze as a part of the Canada's women's team pursuit at the 2012 Olympics together with Tara Whitten and Gillian Carleton. After winning the bronze Duehring said "We were so ready to just go out there and do our best. Team Canada, in coming here, has a saying, ‘Give Your Everything, and that was kind of our motto — leave everything out there."

In 2016, she was officially named in Canada's 2016 Olympic team, and again won a bronze medal.

She has qualified to represent Canada at the 2020 Summer Olympics.

== Personal ==
Duehring was born in Paderborn, Germany and currently resides in Vancouver, British Columbia. She moved to Canada at the age of eight when her father took a position at Simon Fraser University teaching computer science. She received her Canadian citizenship shortly before the 2012 Olympics.

== Major results ==
=== Track ===
2011
1st Team pursuit, Pan American Games
2012
UCI Track World Championships

2nd Points race
3rd Team pursuit

2nd Team pursuit, 2011–12 UCI Track Cycling World Cup, London
3rd Team pursuit, Olympic Games
2013
1st Team pursuit, 2012–13 UCI Track Cycling World Cup, Aguascalientes
1st Team pursuit, Los Angeles Grand Prix (with Allison Beveridge, Laura Brown, Gillian Carleton and Stephanie Roorda)
2013–14 UCI Track Cycling World Cup

2nd Team pursuit, Manchester
2nd Points race, Aguascalientes
2nd Team pursuit, Aguascalientes

3rd Team pursuit, UCI Track World Championships
2014
1st Team pursuit, 2013–14 UCI Track Cycling World Cup, Guadalajara
Pan American Track Championships

1st Points race
1st Individual pursuit

UCI Track World Championships

2nd Team pursuit
3rd Points race

2014–15 UCI Track Cycling World Cup

2nd Team pursuit, Guadalajara
2nd Points race, London
3rd Team pursuit, London

2nd Omnium, Los Angeles Grand Prix
2015
Pan American Games

1st Team pursuit (with Allison Beveridge, Laura Brown and Kirsti Lay)
2nd Omnium

Team pursuit, 2015–16 UCI Track Cycling World Cup

1st Cali
2nd Cambridge

Milton International Challenge

1st Omnium
1st Team pursuit (with Allison Beveridge, Laura Brown and Kirsti Lay)

3rd Team pursuit, UCI Track World Championships
2016
Pan American Track Championships

1st Points race
1st Team pursuit (with Ariane Bonhomme, Kinley Gibson and Jamie Gilgen)
3rd Individual pursuit

2015–16 UCI Track Cycling World Cup, Hong Kong

1st Team pursuit
2nd Points race

UCI Track World Championships

2nd Points race
2nd Team pursuit (with Allison Beveridge, Kirsti Lay and Georgia Simmerling)

3rd Team pursuit, Olympic Games (with Allison Beveridge, Kirsti Lay and Georgia Simmerling)
2017
2016–17 UCI Track Cycling World Cup, Los Angeles

2nd Scratch
3rd Team pursuit

2nd Points race, 2017–18 UCI Track Cycling World Cup, Milton
7th Overall Six Days of London

1st Scratch

2018
3rd Points race, UCI Track World Championships
2019
Team pursuit, 2019–20 UCI Track Cycling World Cup

3rd Cambridge
3rd Brisbane

=== Road ===
2013
3rd Time trial, National Road Championships
2014
2nd Time trial, National Road Championships
3rd Chrono Gatineau
3rd Grand Prix cycliste de Gatineau
10th Time trial, Commonwealth Games
2015
Pan American Games

1st Road race
2nd Time trial

2nd Time trial, National Road Championships
4th Overall Tour of the Gila

1st Young rider classification

6th Overall San Dimas Stage Race

1st Young rider classification

10th Chrono Gatineau
2016
3rd Overall Tour of the Gila

1st Young rider classification
1st Stage 2

2017
3rd Overall Cascade Cycling Classic
7th Chrono Gatineau
2018
1st Overall San Dimas Stage Race

1st Stages 1 (ITT) & 2

3rd Chrono Kristin Armstrong
5th Overall Redlands Bicycle Classic

1st Stage 3

6th Overall Tour of the Gila
9th Winston-Salem Cycling Classic
2019
3rd Overall Tour of the Gila
6th Chrono Kristin Armstrong
9th Overall Joe Martin Stage Race
