= Allison Beveridge =

Canadian cyclist (born 1993)

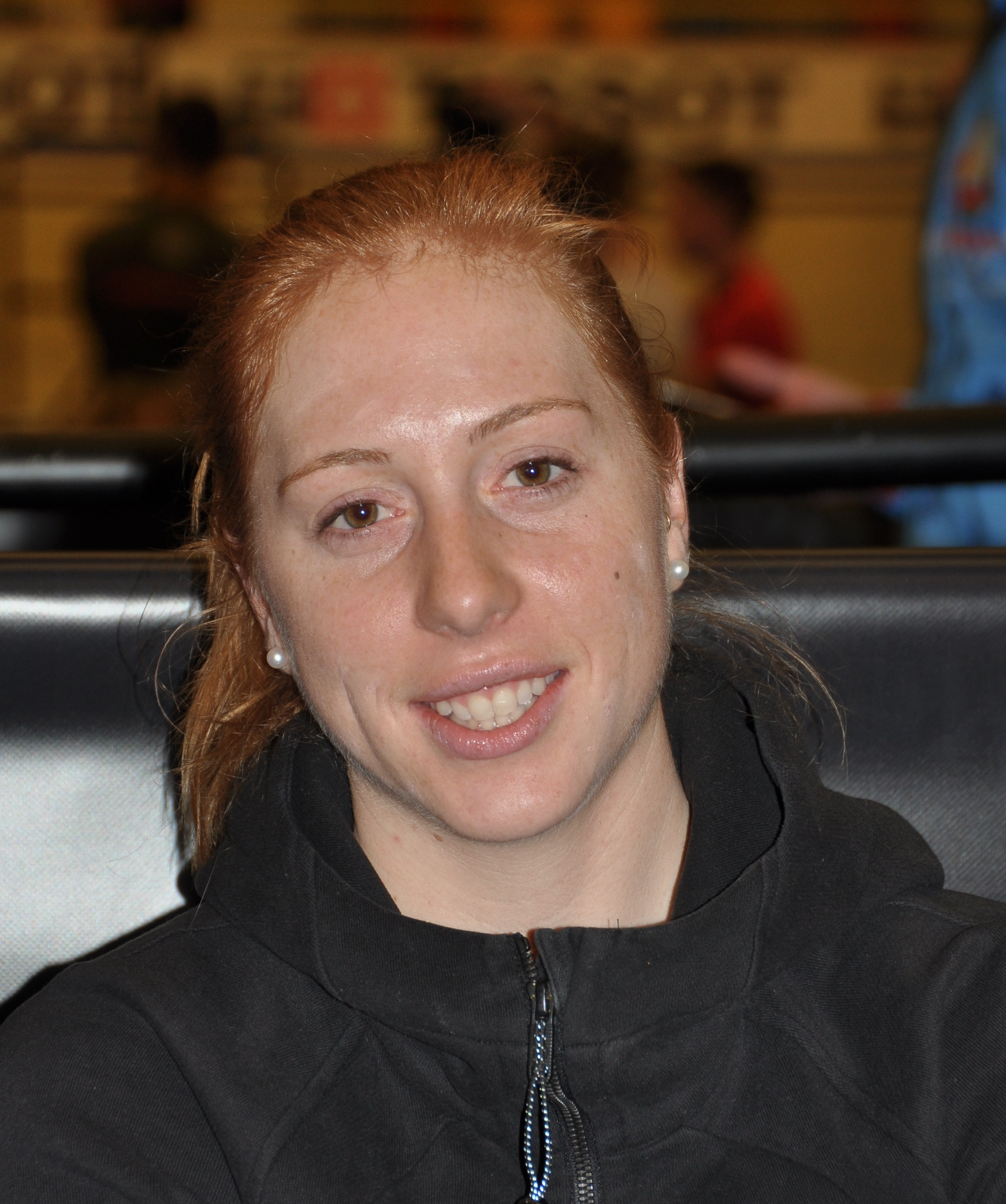
- Beveridge in 2018.

Personal information
- Full name: Allison Beveridge
- Born: 1 June 1993 (age 33) Calgary, Alberta, Canada
- Height: 169 cm (5 ft 7 in)
- Weight: 62 kg (137 lb)

Cycling career
- Sport: Cycling
- Disciplines: Road; Track
- Role: Rider
- Rider type: Pursuitist

Professional team
- 2017–2020: Rally Cycling
Medal record
Representing Canada
Women's track cycling
Olympic Games
Bronze medal – third place	2016 Rio de Janeiro	Team pursuit
World Championships
Silver medal – second place	2014 Cali	Team pursuit
Silver medal – second place	2016 London	Team pursuit
Bronze medal – third place	2015 Yvelines	Team pursuit
Bronze medal – third place	2015 Yvelines	Scratch race
Pan American Games
Gold medal – first place	2015 Toronto	Team pursuit
Pan American Championships
Gold medal – first place	2017 Balmain	Madison
Gold medal – first place	2017 Balmain	Team pursuit
Gold medal – first place	2019 Cochabamba	Team pursuit
Silver medal – second place	2015 Santiago	Omnium
Silver medal – second place	2015 Santiago	Scratch race
Silver medal – second place	2015 Santiago	Team pursuit
Silver medal – second place	2018 Aguascalientes	Madison
Silver medal – second place	2019 Cochabamba	Omnium
Bronze medal – third place	2017 Balmain	Scratch race
Commonwealth Games
Bronze medal – third place	2018 Gold Coast	Team pursuit
Women's road cycling
Pan American Games
Bronze medal – third place	2015 Toronto	Road race

Allison Beveridge (born 1 June 1993) is a Canadian former professional racing cyclist, who rode professionally between 2017 and 2020, entirely for UCI Women's Continental Team Rally Cycling.

Primarily competing in track cycling, Beveridge won medals at the Summer Olympic Games (1 bronze), the UCI Track Cycling World Championships (2 silver, 2 bronze), the Pan American Games (1 gold, 1 bronze), the Pan American Cycling Championships (3 gold, 5 silver and 1 bronze) and the Commonwealth Games (1 bronze).

== Personal life ==
Beveridge has an undergraduate degree in kinesiology from the University of Calgary, and a master's degree in physical therapy from the University of Alberta.

== Major results ==
2012
1st Team pursuit, Pan American Track Championships
2013
1st Team pursuit, Los Angeles Grand Prix (with Laura Brown, Gillian Carleton, Jasmin Glaesser and Stephanie Roorda)
2014
1st Team pursuit, 2013–14 UCI Track Cycling World Cup, Guadalajara
2nd Team pursuit, UCI Track World Championships
2014–15 UCI Track Cycling World Cup

2nd Team pursuit, Guadalajara
3rd Team pursuit, London

2015
Pan American Games

1st Team pursuit (with Laura Brown, Jasmin Glaesser and Kirsti Lay)
3rd Road race

2015–16 UCI Track Cycling World Cup

1st Team pursuit, Cali
1st Omnium, Cambridge
2nd Team pursuit, Cambridge

Milton International Challenge

1st Team pursuit (with Laura Brown, Jasmin Glaesser and Kirsti Lay)
3rd Omnium

Pan American Track Championships

2nd Omnium
2nd Scratch
2nd Team pursuit (with Annie Foreman-Mackey, Kirsti Lay and Stephanie Roorda)

UCI Track World Championships

3rd Scratch
3rd Team pursuit

2016
2nd Team pursuit, UCI Track World Championships
3rd Team pursuit, Olympic Games
2017
2017–18 UCI Track Cycling World Cup

1st Team pursuit, Milton
2nd Team pursuit, Pruszków (with Ariane Bonhomme, Annie Foreman-Mackey and Kinley Gibson)
2nd Omnium, Milton

Pan American Track Championships

1st Madison (with Stephanie Roorda)
3rd Scratch

1st Road race, National Road Championships
2018
2nd Madison, Pan American Track Championships (with Stephanie Roorda)
2018–19 UCI Track Cycling World Cup

3rd Madison, Milton (with Stephanie Roorda)
3rd Team pursuit, Berlin
3rd Omnium, London

3rd Team pursuit, Commonwealth Games
2019
Pan American Track Championships

1st Team pursuit
2nd Omnium

2018–19 UCI Track Cycling World Cup, Cambridge

2nd Omnium
2nd Team pursuit

2019–20 UCI Track Cycling World Cup

2nd Omnium, Brisbane
3rd Team pursuit, Cambridge
3rd Omnium, Cambridge
3rd Team pursuit, Brisbane

2nd Grand Prix Cycliste de Gatineau
