= 2014 UCI Track Cycling World Championships – Women's points race =

The Women's points race at the 2014 UCI Track Cycling World Championships was held on 1 March 2014. 19 cyclists participated in the contest, which was contested over 100 laps, equating to a distance of 25 km (15.5 mi).

== Medalists ==
Gold	Amy Cure (AUS)
Silver	Stephanie Pohl (GER)
Bronze	Jasmin Glaesser (CAN)

== Results ==
The race was started at 19:50.

Rank	Name	Nation	Sprint points	Lap points	Total points
1st place, gold medalist(s)	Amy Cure	Australia	18	20	38
2nd place, silver medalist(s)	Stephanie Pohl	Germany	15	20	35
3rd place, bronze medalist(s)	Jasmin Glaesser	Canada	12	20	32
4	Katie Archibald	Great Britain	5	20	25
5	María Luisa Calle	Colombia	4	20	24
6	Caroline Ryan	Ireland	1	20	21
7	Giorgia Bronzini	Italy	21	0	21
8	Anastasia Chulkova	Russia	1	20	21
9	Julie Leth	Denmark	9	0	9
10	Yudelmis Domínguez	Cuba	6	0	6
11	Jamie Wong	Hong Kong	6	0	6
12	Małgorzata Wojtyra	Poland	4	0	4
13	Kelly Druyts	Belgium	4	0	4
14	Elizabeth Newell	United States	3	0	3
15	Jarmila Machačová	Czech Republic	1	0	1
16	Volha Masiukovich	Belarus	0	0	0
17	Íngrid Drexel	Mexico	0	0	0
18	Ana Usabiaga	Spain	0	0	0
19	Valeriya Kononenko	Ukraine	0	−20	−20
