= Cycling at the 2015 Pan American Games – Women's road race =

Women's road race at the 2015 Pan American Games
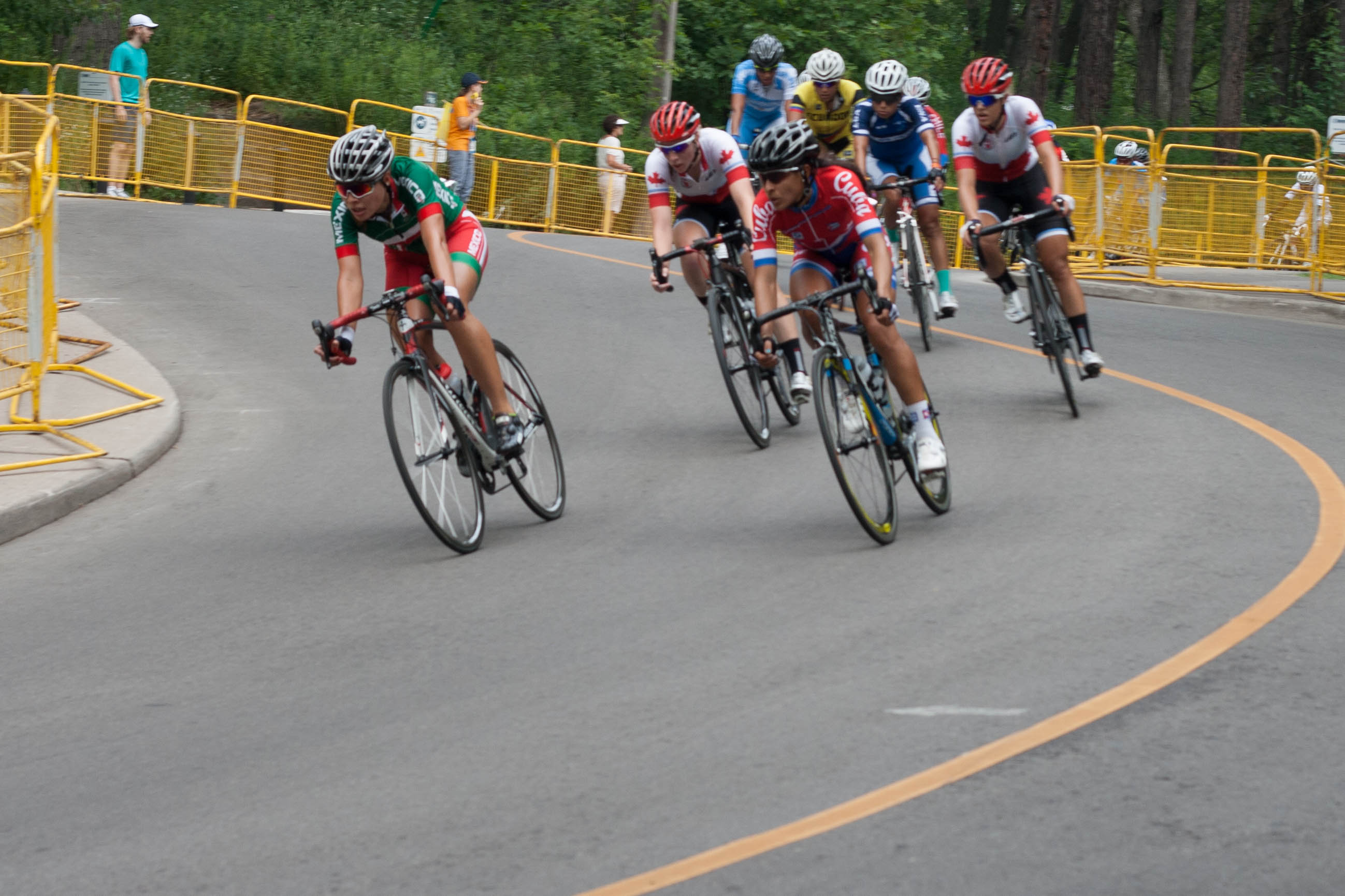
- Venue: Exhibition Place
- Dates: July 25
- Competitors: 34 from 15 nations
- Winning time: 2:07:17

Medalists
| Gold medal | Jasmin Glaesser | Canada |
| Silver medal | Marlies Mejías | Cuba |
| Bronze medal | Allison Beveridge | Canada |

The women's road race competition of the cycling events at the 2015 Pan American Games was held on July 25 in the streets of Downtown Toronto and High Park with the start and finish being at Exhibition Place.

== Schedule ==
All times are Eastern Daylight Time (UTC−4).

| Date | Time | Round |
|---|---|---|
| July 25, 2015 | 13:05 | Final |

== Results ==
| Rank | Rider | Nation | Time |
|---|---|---|---|
| 1st place, gold medalist(s) | Jasmin Glaesser | Canada | 2:07:17 |
| 2nd place, silver medalist(s) | Marlies Mejías | Cuba | 2:07:17 |
| 3rd place, bronze medalist(s) | Allison Beveridge | Canada | 2:07:51 |
| 4 | Arlenis Sierra | Cuba | 2:07:51 |
| 5 | Cristina Irma Greve | Argentina | 2:07:51 |
| 6 | Paola Muñoz | Chile | 2:07:51 |
| 7 | Ruth Winder | United States | 2:07:52 |
| 8 | Yumari González | Cuba | 2:07:52 |
| 9 | Rocha Guerrero | Mexico | 2:07:52 |
| 10 | Gleydimar Tapia | Venezuela | 2:07:52 |
| 11 | Íngrid Drexel | Mexico | 2:07:52 |
| 12 | Karla Vallejos | Chile | 2:07:52 |
| 13 | Ana Paula Polegatch | Brazil | 2:07:52 |
| 14 | Jennifer Cesar | Venezuela | 2:07:52 |
| 15 | Zuralmy Rivas | Venezuela | 2:07:52 |
| 16 | Lorena Colmenares | Colombia | 2:07:52 |
| 17 | Edith Guillén | Costa Rica | 2:07:53 |
| 18 | Evelyn García | El Salvador | 2:07:53 |
| 19 | Daniela Guajardo | Chile | 2:07:53 |
| 20 | Lizbeth Salazar | Mexico | 2:07:53 |
| 21 | Emelyn Galicia Ramirez | Guatemala | 2:07:54 |
| 22 | Mariela Delgado | Argentina | 2:07:54 |
| 23 | Miryam Nuzez Padilla | Ecuador | 2:07:55 |
| 24 | Clemilda Fernandes | Brazil | 2:07:55 |
| 25 | Camila Valbuena | Colombia | 2:07:55 |
| 26 | Milagro Mena Solano | Costa Rica | 2:07:55 |
| 27 | Tamiko Butler | Antigua and Barbuda | 2:07:56 |
| 28 | Janildes Fernandes | Brazil | 2:07:56 |
| 29 | Kirsti Lay | Canada | 2:07:57 |
| 30 | Lauren Tamayo | United States | 2:08:00 |
| 31 | Cynthia Lee Lopez | Guatemala | 2:22:56 |
| 32 | Jasmin Soto Lopez | Guatemala | 2:22:56 |
| 33 | María Vargas | Costa Rica | 2:29:17 |
| | Zoenique Williams | Bermuda | DNF |
