= 2012 UCI Track Cycling World Championships – Women's points race =

Rainbow jersey

The Women's points race at the 2012 UCI Track Cycling World Championships was held on April 5. Eighteen athletes participated in the contest.

== Medalists ==
Gold	Anastasia Chulkova (RUS)
Silver	Jasmin Glaesser (CAN)
Bronze	Caroline Ryan (IRL)

== Results ==
The final was held at 22:05.

Rank	Name	Nation	Sprint points	Lap points	Total points
1st place, gold medalist(s)	Anastasia Chulkova	Russia	11	20	31
2nd place, silver medalist(s)	Jasmin Glaesser	Canada	8	20	28
3rd place, bronze medalist(s)	Caroline Ryan	Ireland	4	20	24
4	Giorgia Bronzini	Italy	23	0	23
5	Wong Wan Yiu	Hong Kong	2	20	22
6	Leire Olaberria	Spain	11	0	11
7	Jarmila Machačová	Czech Republic	10	0	10
8	Katarzyna Pawłowska	Poland	8	0	8
9	Tatsiana Sharakova	Belarus	7	0	7
10	Amy Cure	Australia	6	0	6
11	Kelly Druyts	Belgium	6	0	6
12	Maki Tabata	Japan	4	0	4
13	Anna Nahirna	Ukraine	3	0	3
14	Rushlee Buchanan	New Zealand	2	0	2
15	Cari Higgins	United States	1	0	1
16	Yumari González	Cuba	1	0	1
17	Angie Sabrina González	Venezuela	0	0	0
	Stephanie Pohl	Germany	3		DNF
