= Cycling at the 2015 Pan American Games – Women's team pursuit =

Cycling – Women's team pursuit at the 2015 Pan American Games
- Venue: Milton Velodrome
- Dates: July 16–17
- Competitors: 38 from 9 nations

Medalists
Gold medal	Allison Beveridge; Laura Brown; Jasmin Glaesser; Kirsti Lay	Canada
Silver medal	Jennifer Valente; Sarah Hammer; Kelly Catlin; Lauren Tamayo; Ruth Winder	United States
Bronze medal	Sofía Arreola; Íngrid Drexel; Mayra Del Rocio Rocha; Lizbeth Salazar	Mexico

The women's team pursuit competition of the cycling events at the 2015 Pan American Games was held on July 16 and 17 at the Milton Velodrome in Milton, Ontario.

== Schedule ==
All times are Eastern Standard Time (UTC−3).

Date	Time	Round
July 16, 2015	11:05	Qualifying
July 16, 2015	18:13	First round
July 17, 2015	18:19	Finals

== Results ==
8 teams of four competitors competed. The top two teams will race for gold, while third and fourth race for the bronze medals.

=== Qualification ===
Rank	Nation	Name	Time	Notes
1	Canada	Allison Beveridge; Laura Brown; Jasmin Glaesser; Kirsti Lay	4:24.368	Q
2	United States	Jennifer Valente; Ruth Winder; Sarah Hammer; Kelly Catlin	4:25.051	Q
3	Mexico	Sofía Arreola; Íngrid Drexel; Mayra Del Rocio Rocha; Lizbeth Salazar	4:37.075	Q
4	Cuba	Yoanka González; Yumari González; Arlenis Sierra; Yeima Torres	4:40.019	Q
5	Venezuela	Jennifer Cesar; Zuralmy Rivas; Leidimar Suarez Medina; Gleydimar Tapia	4:44.176	Q
6	Chile	Denísse Ahumada; Daniela Guajardo; Valentina Monsalve; Flor Palma	4:46.067	Q
7	Colombia	María Luisa Calle; Yeny Colmenares; Jannie Salcedo; Camila Valbuena	4:49.287	Q
8	Guatemala	Nicolle Bruderer; Emelyn Galicia Ramirez; Cynthia Lee Lopez; Jasmin Soto Lopez	4:57.091	Q
9	Costa Rica	Edith Guillén; Paula Herrera Hernandez; Marcela Rubiano; María Vargas Barrientos	5:07.156	

=== First round ===
Rank	Heat	Nation	Name	Time	Notes
1	3	United States	Jennifer Valente; Sarah Hammer; Kelly Catlin; Lauren Tamayo		Q
2	4	Canada	Allison Beveridge; Laura Brown; Jasmin Glaesser; Kirsti Lay		Q
3	3	Mexico	Sofía Arreola; Íngrid Drexel; Mayra Del Rocio Rocha; Lizbeth Salazar	4:36.183	
4	1	Colombia	María Luisa Calle; Yeny Colmenares; Jannie Salcedo; Camila Valbuena	4:38.332	
5	4	Cuba	Yoanka González; Yumari González; Arlenis Sierra; Yeima Torres	4:40.356	
6	2	Venezuela	Jennifer Cesar; Zuralmy Rivas; Leidimar Suarez Medina; Gleydimar Tapia	4:42.692	
7	1	Chile	Denísse Ahumada; Daniela Guajardo; Valentina Monsalve; Flor Palma	4:42.817	
8	2	Guatemala	Emelyn Galicia Ramirez; Cynthia Lee Lopez; Jasmin Soto Lopez; Joanne Rodriguez Haconen	5:04.573	

=== Finals ===
Rank	Heat	Nation	Name	Time	Notes
1st place, gold medalist(s)	For Gold	Canada	Allison Beveridge; Laura Brown; Jasmin Glaesser; Kirsti Lay	4:19.664	PR
2nd place, silver medalist(s)	For Gold	United States	Jennifer Valente; Sarah Hammer; Kelly Catlin; Lauren Tamayo	4:26.426	
3rd place, bronze medalist(s)	For Bronze	Mexico	Sofía Arreola; Íngrid Drexel; Mayra Del Rocio Rocha; Lizbeth Salazar		
DQ	For Bronze	Colombia	María Luisa Calle; Yeny Colmenares; Jannie Salcedo; Camila Valbuena	OVL	
4	For 5–6	Venezuela	Jennifer Cesar; Zuralmy Rivas; Leidimar Suarez Medina; Gleydimar Tapia	4:41.652	
5	For 5–6	Cuba	Yoanka González; Yumari González; Arlenis Sierra; Yeima Torres	4:42.971	
6	For 7–8	Chile	Denísse Ahumada; Daniela Guajardo; Valentina Monsalve; Flor Palma		
7	For 7–8	Guatemala	Emelyn Galicia Ramirez; Cynthia Lee Lopez; Jasmin Soto Lopez; Nicolle Bruderer	OVL	

- María Luisa Calle was disqualified to testing positive for steroids.
