= Cycling at the 2011 Pan American Games – Women's team pursuit =

Cycling – Women's team pursuit at the 2011 Pan American Games
- Venue: Pan American Velodrome
- Dates: October 18
- Competitors: 24 from 8 nations

Medalists
Gold medal	Laura Brown; Jasmin Glaesser; Stephanie Roorda	Canada
Silver medal	Yumari González; Dalila Rodriguez; Yudelmis Domínguez	Cuba
Bronze medal	María Luisa Calle; Sérika Gulumá; Lorena Vargas	Colombia

The women's team pursuit competition of the cycling events at the 2011 Pan American Games will be held on October 18 at the Pan American Velodrome in Guadalajara. This will be the first time this event is held at the Pan American Games.

== Schedule ==
All times are Central Standard Time (UTC−6).

Date	Time	Round
October 18, 2011	10:20	Qualifying
October 18, 2011	18:00	Final

== Results ==
8 teams of three competitors competed. The top two teams will race for gold, while third and fourth race for the bronze medals.

=== Qualification ===
Rank	Name	Nation	Time	Notes
1	Laura Brown; Jasmin Glaesser; Stephanie Roorda	Canada	3:25.093	Q PR
2	Yumari González; Dalila Rodriguez; Yudelmis Domínguez	Cuba	3:26.745	Q
3	María Luisa Calle; Sérika Gulumá; Lorena Vargas	Colombia	3:27.753	q
4	Lilibeth Chacón; Danielys García; Angie Sabrina González	Venezuela	3:28.629	q
5	Íngrid Drexel; Jessica Jurado; Mayra Rocha	Mexico	3:33.687	
6	Daniela Guajardo; Francisca Navarro; Claudia Aravena	Chile	3:37.730	
7	Uênia de Souza; Clemilda Silva; Janildes Silva	Brazil	3:37.903	
8	Talia Aguirre; Alejandra Feszczuk; Valeria Müller	Argentina	3:40.329	

=== Finals ===
Rank	Name	Nation	Time	Notes
Gold Medal Race
1st place, gold medalist(s)	Laura Brown; Jasmin Glaesser; Stephanie Roorda	Canada	3:21.448	PR
2nd place, silver medalist(s)	Yumari González; Dalila Rodriguez; Yudelmis Domínguez	Cuba	3:25.335	
Bronze Medal Race
3rd place, bronze medalist(s)	María Luisa Calle; Sérika Gulumá; Lorena Vargas	Colombia	3:26.888	
4	Lilibeth Chacón; Danielys García; Angie Sabrina González	Venezuela	3:30.823	
