= 2018 UCI Track Cycling World Championships – Women's individual pursuit =

Women's individual pursuit at the 2018 UCI Track Cycling World Championships
- Venue: Omnisport Apeldoorn
- Location: Apeldoorn, Netherlands
- Dates: 3 March
- Competitors: 22 from 14 nations
- Winning time: 3:20.060

Medalists
gold medal	Chloé Dygert	United States
silver medal	Annemiek van Vleuten	Netherlands
bronze medal	Kelly Catlin	United States

The Women's individual pursuit competition at the 2018 UCI Track Cycling World Championships was held on 3 March 2018 at the Omnisport Apeldoorn in Apeldoorn, Netherlands.

== Results ==
=== Qualifying ===
The first two racers race for gold, the third and fourth fastest rider race for the bronze medal.

Rank	Name	Nation	Time	Behind	Notes
1	Chloé Dygert	United States	3:20.072		Q, WR
2	Annemiek van Vleuten	Netherlands	3:29.319	+9.247	Q
3	Lisa Brennauer	Germany	3:32.485	+12.413	q
4	Kelly Catlin	United States	3:33.084	+13.012	q
5	Justyna Kaczkowska	Poland	3:33.675	+13.603	
6	Kirstie James	New Zealand	3:34.150	+14.078	
7	Ellie Dickinson	Great Britain	3:34.507	+14.435	
8	Silvia Valsecchi	Italy	3:35.395	+15.323	
9	Emily Nelson	Great Britain	3:35.519	+15.447	
10	Gudrun Stock	Germany	3:36.438	+16.366	
11	Annie Foreman-Mackey	Canada	3:36.475	+16.403	
12	Martina Alzini	Italy	3:36.692	+16.620	
13	Bryony Botha	New Zealand	3:38.065	+17.993	
14	Marion Borras	France	3:38.392	+18.320	
15	Kinley Gibson	Canada	3:39.328	+19.256	
16	Pia Pensaari	Finland	3:39.517	+19.445	
17	Annelies Dom	Belgium	3:40.781	+20.709	
18	Ina Savenka	Belarus	3:40.882	+20.810	
19	Yuya Hashimoto	Japan	3:43.676	+23.604	
20	Marie Le Net	France	3:44.023	+23.951	
21	Nikola Rozynska	Poland	3:51.359	+31.287	
22	Yang Qianyu	Hong Kong	3:55.709	+35.637	

=== Finals ===
The finals were held at 20:25.

Rank	Name	Nation	Time	Notes
Gold medal race
1st place, gold medalist(s)	Chloé Dygert	United States	3:20.060	WR
2nd place, silver medalist(s)	Annemiek van Vleuten	Netherlands		OVL
Bronze medal race
3rd place, bronze medalist(s)	Kelly Catlin	United States	3:34.658	
4	Lisa Brennauer	Germany	3:35.920	+1.262
