= 2023 UCI Track Cycling World Championships – Women's individual pursuit =

Women's individual pursuit at the 2023 UCI Track Cycling World Championships
- Venue: Sir Chris Hoy Velodrome
- Location: Glasgow, United Kingdom
- Dates: 3 August
- Competitors: 24 from 15 nations
- Winning time: 3:17.542

Medalists
gold medal	Chloé Dygert	United States
silver medal	Franziska Brauße	Germany
bronze medal	Bryony Botha	New Zealand

The Women's individual pursuit competition at the 2023 UCI Track Cycling World Championships was held on 3 August 2023.

== Results ==
=== Qualifying ===
The qualifying was held at 12:43. The two fasters riders race for gold, the third and fourth fastest riders race for bronze.

Rank	Name	Nation	Time	Behind	Notes
1	Chloé Dygert	United States	3:17.713		QG
2	Franziska Brauße	Germany	3:20.101	+2.388	QG
3	Bryony Botha	New Zealand	3:20.327	+2.614	QB
4	Neah Evans	Great Britain	3:21.811	+4.098	QB
5	Maeve Plouffe	Australia	3:21.940	+4.227	
6	Lisa Klein	Germany	3:25.728	+8.015	
7	Maggie Coles-Lyster	Canada	3:27.241	+9.528	
8	Marion Borras	France	3:27.601	+9.888	
9	Samantha Donnelly	New Zealand	3:27.616	+9.903	
10	Jessica Roberts	Great Britain	3:27.979	+10.266	
11	Kelly Murphy	Ireland	3:29.967	+12.254	
12	Ariane Bonhomme	Canada	3:30.015	+12.302	
13	Sarah Van Dam	Canada	3:30.831	+13.118	
14	Laura Süßemilch	Germany	3:31.278	+13.565	
15	Martina Alzini	Italy	3:32.101	+14.388	
16	Wei Suwan	China	3:36.898	+19.185	
17	Wang Xiaoyue	China	3:37.107	+19.394	
18	Olga Wankiewicz	Poland	3:37.266	+19.564	
19	Jasmin Liechti	Switzerland	3:38.286	+20.573	
20	Isabella Escalera	Spain	3:38.567	+20.854	
21	Huang Zhilin	China	3:42.678	+24.965	
22	Kie Furuyama	Japan	3:44.511	+26.798	
23	Yang Qianyu	Hong Kong	3:49.099	+31.386	
–	Vittoria Guazzini	Italy	Did not finish		

=== Finals ===
The finals were started at 19:50.

Rank	Name	Nation	Time	Behind
Gold medal race
1st place, gold medalist(s)	Chloé Dygert	United States	3:17.542	
2nd place, silver medalist(s)	Franziska Brauße	Germany	OVL	
Bronze medal race
3rd place, bronze medalist(s)	Bryony Botha	New Zealand	3:22.210	
4	Neah Evans	Great Britain	3:23.264	+1.054
