= Ruth Edwards (cyclist) =

American racing cyclist

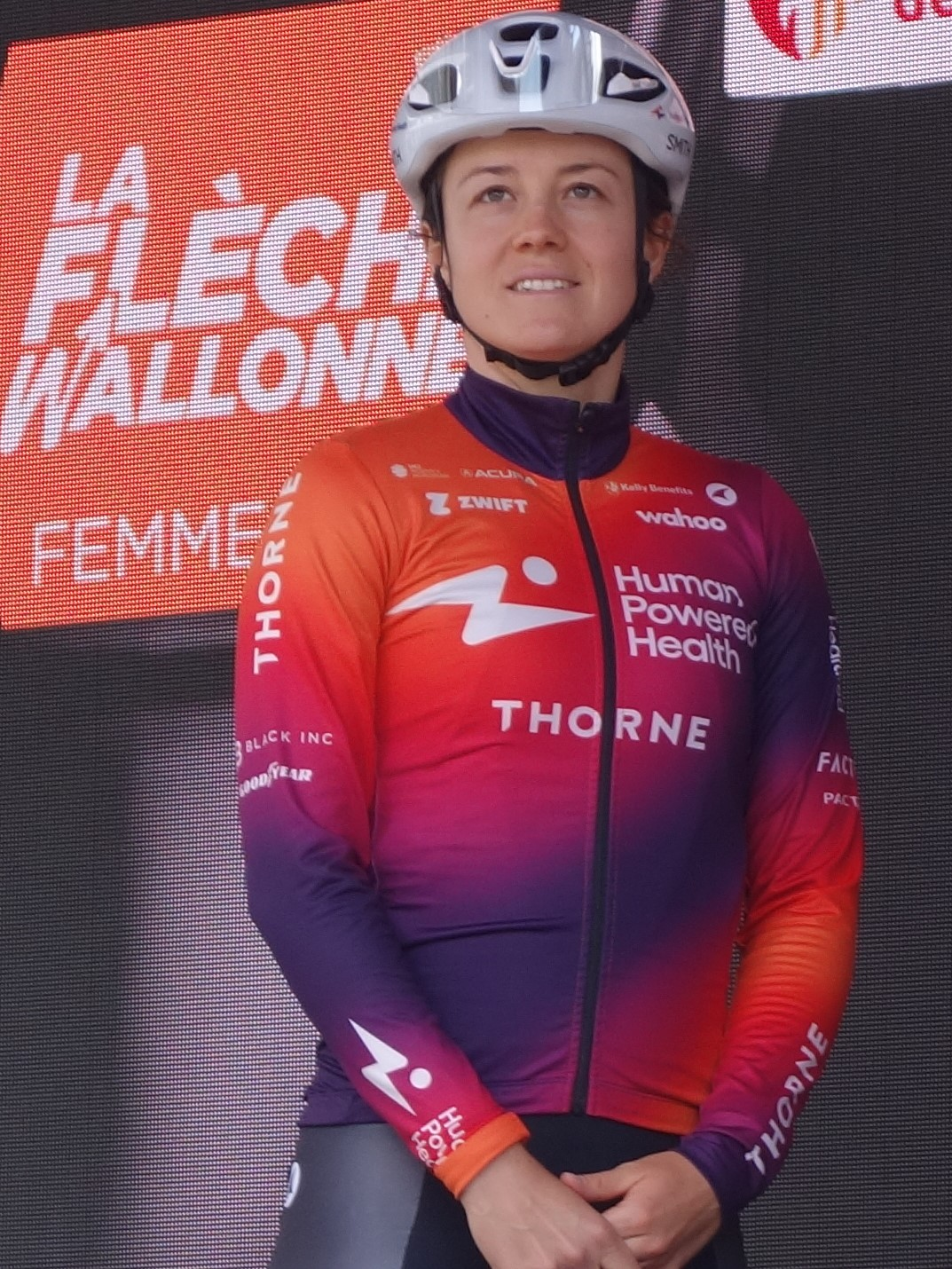
- Winder in 2024

Personal information
- Full name: Ruth Joyce Edwards
- Born: Ruth Joyce Winder; July 9, 1993 (age 33) Keighley, West Yorkshire, United Kingdom
- Height: 5 ft 4 in (163 cm)
- Weight: 130 lb (59 kg)

Cycling career
- Sport: Cycling
- Current team: Human Powered Health
- Disciplines: Road; Track
- Role: Rider
- Rider type: All rounder

Amateur teams
- 2010: Peanut Butter P/B 2012
- 2011: HDR P/B Lombardi Sports
- 2012–2013: Vanderkitten

Professional teams
- 2014–2015: UnitedHealthcare
- 2017: UnitedHealthcare
- 2018: Team Sunweb
- 2019–2021: Trek–Segafredo
- 2024–: Human Powered Health

Major wins
- Stage races Tour Down Under (2020) One-day races and Classics National Road Race Championships (2019) Brabantse Pijl (2021)
Medal record
Representing United States
Women's track cycling
Pan American Games
Silver medal – second place	2015 Toronto	Team pursuit
Pan American Championships
Gold medal – first place	2015 Santiago	Team pursuit

Ruth Joyce Edwards (née Winder born July 9, 1993) is a British-born American professional cyclist. She took up the sport as a teenager, and went on to turn professional with UnitedHealthcare in 2014. In July 2021, Winder announced that she would retire from professional competition at the end of the season. During the 2021 UCI Road World Championships in Flanders, she was elected to a four-year term as a representative for road cycling on the Union Cycliste Internationale Athletes' Commission, winning 83 percent of the vote. In 2024, after a two-year "sabbatical", she rejoined the professional peloton, signing a contract with Human Powered Health.

== Major results ==
=== Road ===
2009
National Junior Road Championships

1st Road race
2nd Time trial

2012
1st Tour of Somerville
1st Cherry Pie Criterium
2nd Johnson Health Grand Prix
2013
1st Land Park Criterium
8th Grand Prix GSB
9th Grand Prix el Salvador
2015
5th Overall Joe Martin Stage Race

1st Young rider classification

7th Road race, Pan American Games
2017
1st Overall Tour de Feminin-O cenu Českého Švýcarska

1st Points classification
1st Stages 1 & 2

1st Overall Joe Martin Stage Race

1st Stages 1 (ITT), 2 & 4

1st Overall Redlands Bicycle Classic

1st Stage 5

1st Anniston McClellan Road Race
2nd Overall Belgium Tour
2nd Cadel Evans Great Ocean Road Race
3rd Road race, National Road Championships
3rd Overall North Star Grand Prix

1st Stages 3 & 5

4th Overall Tour of the Gila

1st Young rider classification

5th Overall Tour of California
8th Overall Women's Tour Down Under
10th Overall Thüringen Rundfahrt der Frauen
2018
1st Team time trial, Ladies Tour of Norway
Giro Rosa

1st Stage 1 (TTT) & 5
Held after Stage 5

4th Overall Tour Cycliste Féminin International de l'Ardèche

1st Points classification
1st Stages 3 & 6

10th Road race, UCI Road World Championships
2019
1st Road race, National Road Championships
1st Postnord UCI WWT Vårgårda West Sweden TTT
1st Stage 1 Setmana Ciclista Valenciana
6th Overall Belgium Tour

1st Prologue

7th Overall Women's Herald Sun Tour
8th Postnord UCI WWT Vårgårda West Sweden
9th Cadel Evans Great Ocean Road Race
9th GP de Plouay – Bretagne
10th Overall Women's Tour Down Under
2020
1st Overall Women's Tour Down Under

1st Stage 3

1st Stage 1 (TTT) Giro Rosa
8th Cadel Evans Great Ocean Road Race
2021
1st Brabantse Pijl
Giro Rosa

1st Stage 1 (TTT)
Held after Stage 1

1st Stage 4 Tour Cycliste Féminin International de l'Ardèche
2nd Donostia San Sebastián Klasikoa
7th Overall Festival Elsy Jacobs
7th La Flèche Wallonne
10th Emakumeen Nafarroako Klasikoa
2024
1st Overall Thüringen Ladies Tour
National Road Championships

2nd Road race
4th Time trial

4th Cadel Evans Great Ocean Road Race
10th Tre Valli Varesine
2025
6th Cadel Evans Great Ocean Road Race
9th Overall Women's Tour Down Under

=== Track ===
2010
National Track Championships

1st Team pursuit
1st Junior scratch

2011
2nd Team pursuit, National Track Championships
2013
1st Team pursuit, Pan American Track Championships
1st Team pursuit, National Track Championships
2nd Team pursuit, Los Angeles Grand Prix (with Kimberly Geist, Sarah Hammer and Jennifer Valente)
2015
1st Team pursuit, Pan American Track Championships (with Kelly Catlin, Sarah Hammer and Jennifer Valente)
2nd Team pursuit, Pan American Games (with Kelly Catlin, Sarah Hammer, Lauren Tamayo and Jennifer Valente)
2nd Team pursuit, 2015–16 UCI Track Cycling World Cup, Cali
3rd Team pursuit, 2014–15 UCI Track Cycling World Cup, Cali
2016
3rd Team pursuit, 2015–16 UCI Track Cycling World Cup, Hong Kong
