= 2020 UCI Track Cycling World Championships – Women's individual pursuit =

Women's individual pursuit at the 2020 UCI Track Cycling World Championships
- Venue: Velodrom
- Location: Berlin, Germany
- Dates: 29 February
- Competitors: 22 from 12 nations

Medalists
gold medal	Chloé Dygert Owen	United States
silver medal	Lisa Brennauer	Germany
bronze medal	Franziska Brauße	Germany

The Women's individual pursuit competition at the 2020 UCI Track Cycling World Championships was held on 29 February 2020.

== Results ==
=== Qualifying ===
The qualifying was started at 13:13. The first two riders raced for gold, the third and fourth fastest rider raced for the bronze medal.

Rank	Name	Nation	Time	Behind	Notes
1	Chloé Dygert Owen	United States	3:17.283		QG, WR
2	Lisa Brennauer	Germany	3:18.320	+1.037	QG
3	Franziska Brauße	Germany	3:20.222	+2.939	QB
4	Lisa Klein	Germany	3:21.828	+4.545	QB
5	Annie Foreman-Mackey	Canada	3:24.968	+7.685	
6	Emma White	United States	3:25.667	+8.384	
7	Jaime Nielsen	New Zealand	3:26.508	+9.225	
8	Ariane Bonhomme	Canada	3:26.513	+9.230	
9	Georgia Simmerling	Canada	3:26.712	+9.429	
10	Maeve Plouffe	Australia	3:26.742	+9.459	
11	Bryony Botha	New Zealand	3:26.837	+9.554	
12	Josie Knight	Great Britain	3:27.875	+10.592	
13	Kirstie James	New Zealand	3:28.006	+10.723	
14	Ashlee Ankudinoff	Australia	3:28.118	+10.835	
15	Kelly Murphy	Ireland	3:29.699	+12.416	
16	Silvia Valsecchi	Italy	3:30.640	+13.357	
17	Tamara Dronova	Russia	3:32.304	+15.021	
18	Coralie Demay	France	3:33.870	+16.587	
19	Marta Cavalli	Italy	3:36.142	+18.859	
20	Palina Pivavarava	Belarus	3:37.467	+20.184	
21	Ina Savenka	Belarus	3:37.530	+20.247	
22	Tereza Medveďová	Slovakia	3:48.471	+31.188	

=== Finals ===
The finals were started at 18:41.

Rank	Name	Nation	Time	Behind
Gold medal race
1st place, gold medalist(s)	Chloé Dygert Owen	United States	3:16.937, WR	
2nd place, silver medalist(s)	Lisa Brennauer	Germany	3:23.229	+6.282
Bronze medal race
3rd place, bronze medalist(s)	Franziska Brauße	Germany	3:24.284	
4	Lisa Klein	Germany	3:26.342	+1.058
