= Chloé Dygert =

American cyclist (born 1997)

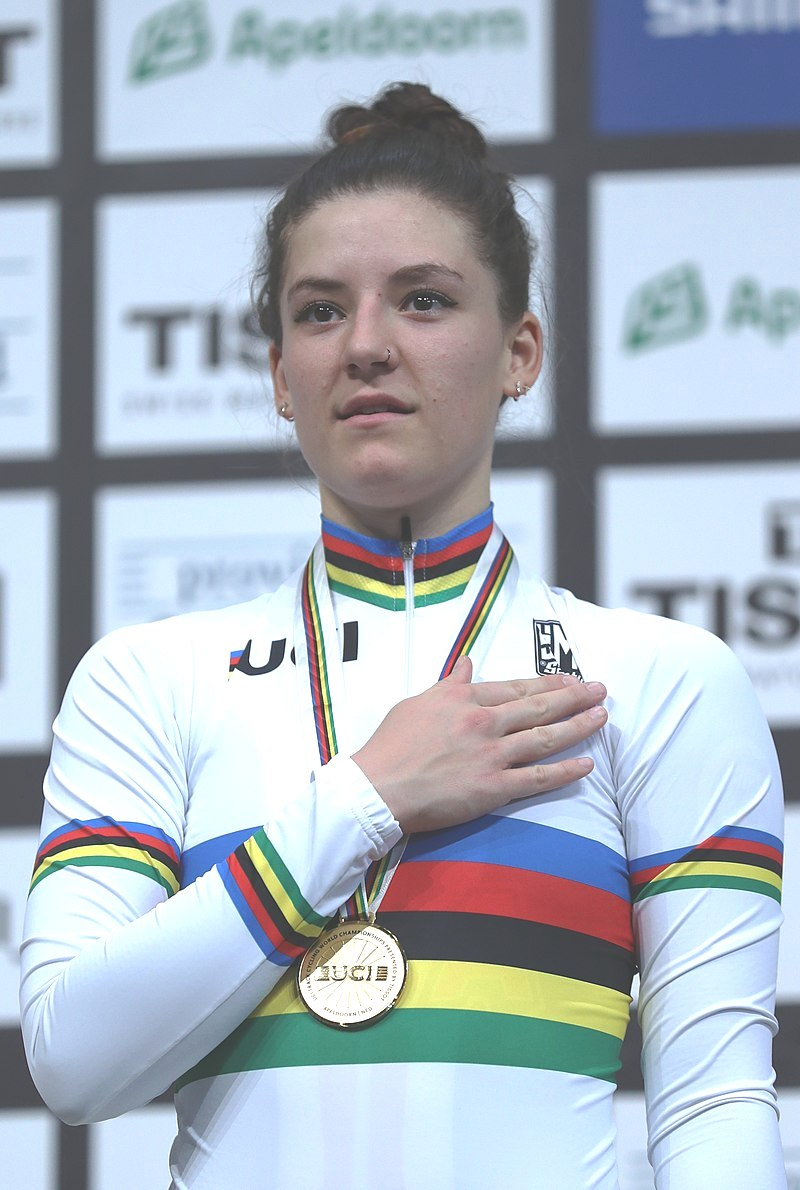
- Dygert in 2018

Personal information
- Full name: Chloé Dygert
- Born: January 1, 1997 (age 29) Brownsburg, Indiana, U.S.
- Height: 5 ft 9 in (175 cm)
- Weight: 147 lb (67 kg)

Cycling career
- Sport: Cycling
- Current team: Canyon//SRAM
- Disciplines: Road; Track
- Role: Rider
- Rider type: Time trialist (road); Pursuitist (track)

Amateur team
- 2020: Twenty20 Pro Cycling

Professional teams
- 2016–2019: Twenty16–Ridebiker
- 2021–: Canyon//SRAM

Major wins
- Road One-day races and Classics World Time Trial Championships (2019, 2023) National Time Trial Championships (2021, 2023) Track Olympic Games Team pursuit (2024) World Championships Individual pursuit (2017, 2018, 2020, 2023) Team pursuit (2016, 2017, 2018, 2020)
Medal record
Representing the United States
Women's track cycling
Olympic Games
Gold medal – first place	2024 Paris	Team pursuit
Silver medal – second place	2016 Rio de Janeiro	Team pursuit
Bronze medal – third place	2020 Tokyo	Team pursuit
World Championships
Gold medal – first place	2016 London	Team pursuit
Gold medal – first place	2017 Hong Kong	Individual pursuit
Gold medal – first place	2017 Hong Kong	Team pursuit
Gold medal – first place	2018 Apeldoorn	Individual pursuit
Gold medal – first place	2018 Apeldoorn	Team pursuit
Gold medal – first place	2020 Berlin	Individual pursuit
Gold medal – first place	2020 Berlin	Team pursuit
Gold medal – first place	2023 Glasgow	Individual pursuit
Silver medal – second place	2024 Ballerup	Individual pursuit
Bronze medal – third place	2025 Santiago	Individual pursuit
Pan American Games
Gold medal – first place	2019 Lima	Team pursuit
Women's road bicycle racing
Olympic Games
Bronze medal – third place	2024 Paris	Time trial
World Championships
Gold medal – first place	2015 Richmond	Time trial (junior)
Gold medal – first place	2015 Richmond	Road race (junior)
Gold medal – first place	2019 Harrogate	Time trial
Gold medal – first place	2023 Glasgow	Time trial
Silver medal – second place	2024 Zurich	Road race
Bronze medal – third place	2024 Zurich	Time trial
Pan American Games
Gold medal – first place	2019 Lima	Time trial
Pan American Championships
Gold medal – first place	2017 Santo Domingo	Time trial

Chloé Dygert (/ˈkloʊ.iː ˈdaɪɡərt/ KLOH-ee DYE-ghərt; born January 1, 1997) is an American professional racing cyclist who rides for UCI Women's WorldTeam Canyon//SRAM. She has won eight gold medals at the UCI Track Cycling World Championships and four medals (one gold, one silver, and two bronze) at the Olympic Games. She also won the Women's junior road race and Women's junior time trial at the 2015 UCI Road World Championships.

== Career ==
Chloé Dygert was athletic from childhood on and played mainly basketball in her early years. However, she did not take cycling seriously until after a shoulder injury in 2013. After another injury she was forced to retire from basketball. In 2015 she became national junior champion, in road racing and individual time trial, as well as two-time Junior World Champion in the same disciplines. Then she received an invitation from the US cycling federation USA Cycling.

In March 2016, Dygert started at the World Cup in London as a member of the US four-in-four team pursuit and won the world title with the team. In the same year, nineteen-year-old Dygert was nominated to participate in the Olympic Games in Rio de Janeiro, where she won a silver medal in the team pursuit.

The 2016 Olympic Pursuit Team was marked by controversy. The head coach, Andy Sparks, was fired for fostering a hostile environment. Dygert supported Sparks and continued to work with him until 2018.

At the 2017 UCI Track Cycling World Championships in Hong Kong, she became World Champion in the team pursuit for the second time, along with Kelly Catlin, Jennifer Valente and Kimberly Geist and clinched the world title in the singles pursuit. In May 2017, she won her first Panamerican title, in the individual time trial on the road.

At the 2018 UCI Track Cycling World Championships, Dygert won two titles: along with Kelly Catlin, Jennifer Valente and Kimberly Geist in the team pursuit and in the individual pursuit. She succeeded the victory in the individual pursuit in an outstanding manner: she set a world record two times in a row, in the qualification as well as in the final (3:20.060 minutes). Her record from the final caught the record of road cycling time-trial world champion, the Dutchwoman Annemiek van Vleuten. In the Pan American Games in 2019 she won gold in the individual time trial.

On September 24, 2020, at the UCI Road World Championships, Dygert crashed during the women's time trial event, suffering a laceration to her left leg which required surgery. That November, Dygert signed a four-year contract with UCI Women's WorldTeam Canyon//SRAM, from the 2021 season.

== Personal life ==
In November 2016, she married fellow professional cyclist Logan Owen and took his surname. The marriage ended in divorce in January 2020.

In 2024, Dygert was in a relationship and living with former professional cyclist Axel Merckx. They have since broken up.

=== Views ===
A 2020 profile by her sponsor Red Bull noted that she is a conservative who does not believe in feminism.

Dygert issued a public apology in November 2020 for her social media conduct that was deemed inappropriate. Apparel manufacturer Rapha criticized her apology as "not sufficient".

At the 2025 UCI World Championship Time Trial race, Dygert included a sticker on her bicycle that said "I stand for truth, I stand with Charlie Kirk" expressing support for the recently murdered conservative activist.

== Career achievements ==
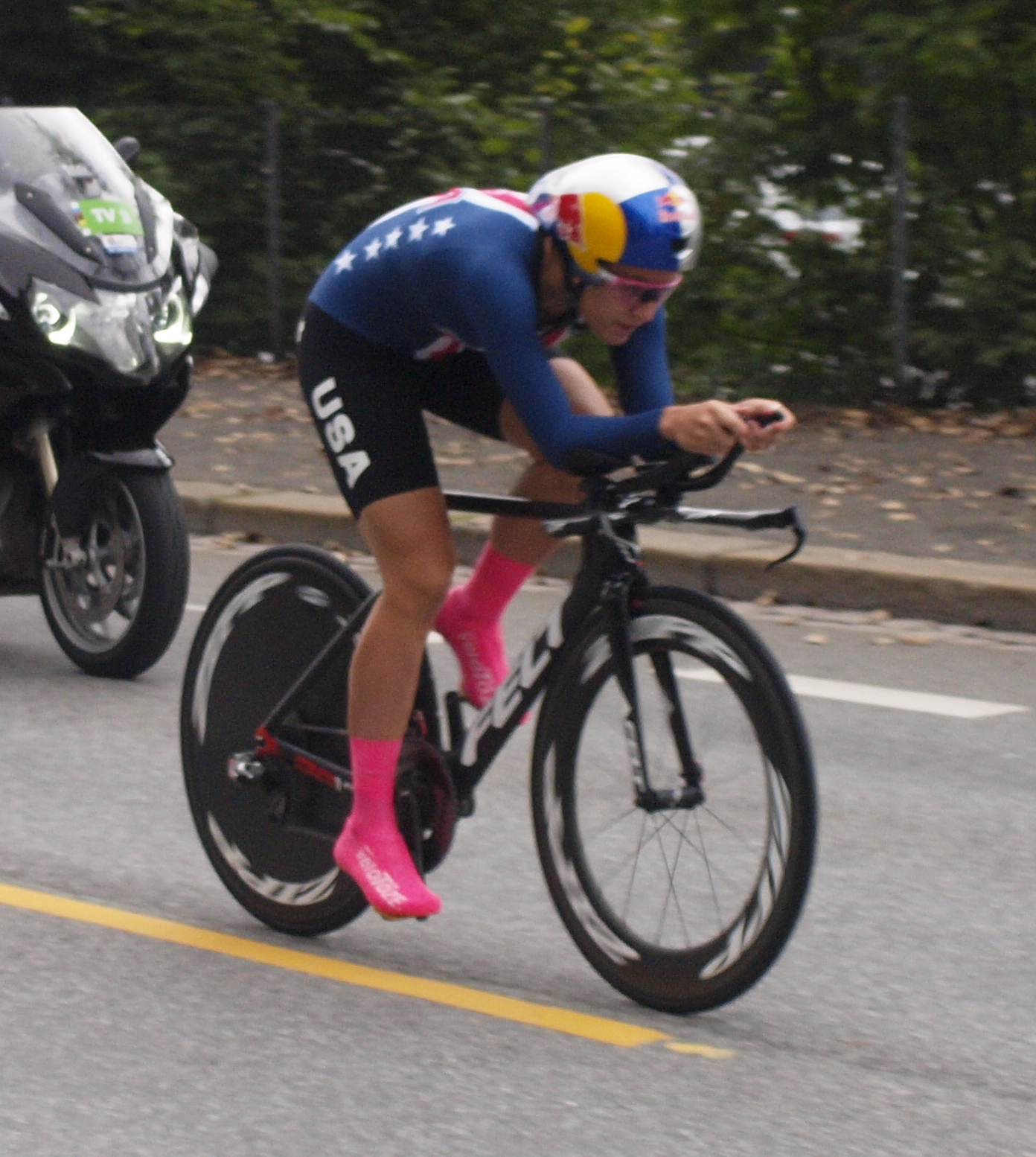
Dygert in 2017.

=== Major results ===
==== Road ====
2013
National Amateur Championships

3rd Road race
3rd Time trial

2015
UCI World Junior Championships

1st Road race
1st Time trial

National Amateur Championships

1st Road race
1st Time trial

2016
6th Overall Tour of California

1st Young rider classification
1st Stage 2 (TTT)

2017
1st Time trial, Pan American Championships
4th UCI Road World Championships – Women's time trial
2018
Tour of the Gila

1st Stages 2 & 3 (ITT)

2nd Chrono Kristin Armstrong
6th Overall Joe Martin Stage Race

1st Young rider classification
1st Stage 4

2019
1st UCI Road World Championships – Women's time trial
1st Time trial, Pan American Games
1st Overall Colorado Classic

1st Points classification
1st Mountains classification
1st Young rider classification
1st Stages 1, 2, 3 & 4

1st Overall Joe Martin Stage Race

1st Points classification
1st Mountains classification
1st Young rider classification
1st Stages 1 & 4

1st Chrono Kristin Armstrong
2nd Overall Tour of the Gila

1st Young rider classification
1st Stages 3 (ITT) & 4

National Championships

2nd Time trial
4th Road race

2021
1st Time trial, National Championships
7th Time trial, Olympic Games
2023
1st UCI Road World Championships – Women's time trial
National Championships

1st Road race
1st Time trial

2nd Overall RideLondon Classique

1st Stage 2

4th Overall Vuelta a Burgos
2024
2nd UCI Road World Championships – Women's road race
2nd Classic Lorient Agglomération
3rd UCI Road World Championships – Women's time trial
3rd Time trial, Olympic Games
6th Classic Brugge–De Panne
2025
1st Stage 3 Tour Down Under
2nd Surf Coast Classic
4th Cadel Evans Great Ocean Road Race
8th Paris–Roubaix
9th UCI Road World Championships – Women's time trial

==== Track ====
2016
1st Team pursuit, UCI World Championships
2nd Team pursuit, Olympic Games
2017
UCI World Championships

1st Individual pursuit
1st Team pursuit

UCI World Cup

1st Individual pursuit, Los Angeles
1st Team pursuit, Los Angeles

2018
UCI World Championships

1st Team pursuit
1st Individual pursuit

2019
1st Team pursuit, Pan American Championships
2020
UCI World Championships

1st Team pursuit
1st Individual pursuit

2021
3rd Team pursuit, Olympic Games
2023
1st Individual pursuit, UCI World Championships
2024
1st Team pursuit, Olympic Games
2nd Individual pursuit, UCI World Championships
2025
3rd Individual pursuit, UCI World Championships

=== World records ===
Event	Record	Date	Meet	Location	Ref
Individual pursuit	3:17.283	February 29, 2020	World Championships	Berlin, Germany	
Individual pursuit	3:16.937	February 29, 2020	World Championships	Berlin, Germany	
