= Kirsti Lay =

Canadian cyclist and speed skater

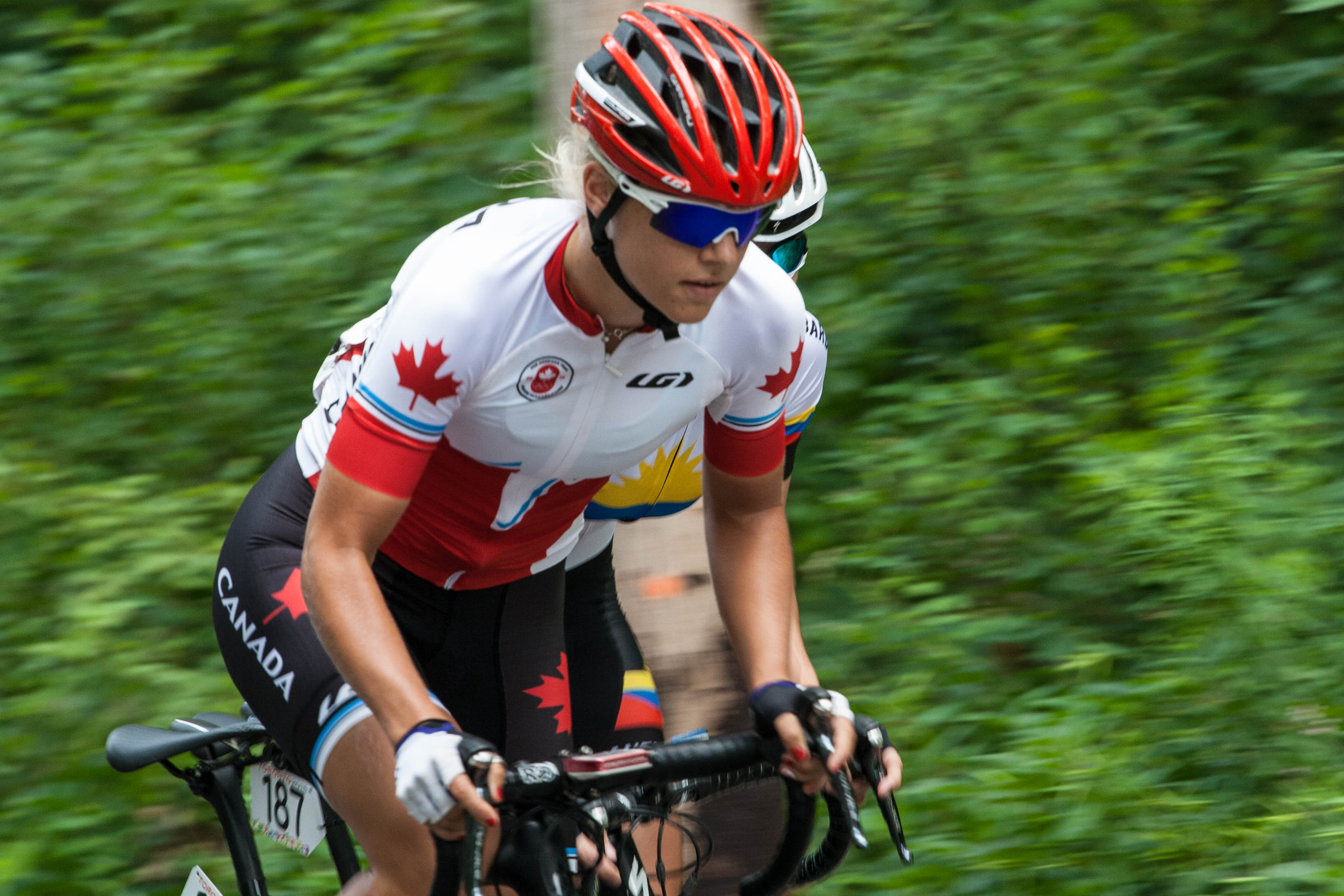
- Lay in 2015

Personal information
- Full name: Kirsti Lay
- Born: 7 April 1988 (age 38) Medicine Hat, Alberta, Canada

Cycling career
- Sport: Cycling
- Current team: Retired
- Disciplines: Road; Track
- Role: Rider

Amateur team
- 2014–2015: SAS–Mazda–Macogep

Professional team
- 2016–2019: Rally Cycling
Medal record
Representing Canada
Women's track cycling
Olympic Games
Bronze medal – third place	2016 Rio de Janeiro	Team pursuit
World Championships
Silver medal – second place	2016 London	Team pursuit
Bronze medal – third place	2015 Yvelines	Team pursuit
Pan American Games
Gold medal – first place	2015 Toronto	Team pursuit
Pan American Championships
Silver medal – second place	2015 Santiago	Team pursuit

Kirsti Lay (born 7 April 1988) is a Canadian former professional racing cyclist, who rode professionally for UCI Women's Team Rally UHC Cycling between 2016 and 2019. She rode at the 2015 UCI Track Cycling World Championships, winning a bronze medal in the Team Pursuit. In 2016, she was named in Canada's 2016 Olympic team. She won the bronze medal in the team pursuit event.

Prior to taking up cycling Lay was a speed skater, competing at the World Junior Speed Skating Championships in 2005, 2006 and 2007 and at the 2009 Winter Universiade. She also took part in two speed skating weekends (at Moscow and at Salt Lake City) of the 2010–11 ISU Speed Skating World Cup.

== Personal life ==
Lay is married to Canadian former speed skater Mathieu Giroux.

== Major results ==
=== Track ===
2014
Team pursuit, 2014–15 UCI Track Cycling World Cup

2nd Guadalajara
3rd London

2015
1st Team pursuit, Pan American Games (with Allison Beveridge, Laura Brown and Jasmin Glaesser)
Team pursuit, 2015–16 UCI Track Cycling World Cup

1st Cali
2nd Cambridge

2nd Team pursuit, Pan American Track Championships (with Allison Beveridge, Annie Foreman-Mackey and Stephanie Roorda)
3rd Team pursuit, UCI Track World Championships
2016
2nd Team pursuit, UCI Track World Championships
3rd Team pursuit, Olympic Games
2017
3rd Team pursuit, 2016–17 UCI Track Cycling World Cup, Los Angeles

=== Road ===
2014
5th Grand Prix cycliste de Gatineau
2015
1st Mountains classification Tour of California
10th Overall San Dimas Stage Race
2017
1st Stage 1 Cascade Cycling Classic
2nd Road race, National Road Championships
2nd Grand Prix Cycliste de Gatineau
8th Chrono Gatineau
9th Winston-Salem Cycling Classic
2018
3rd Time trial, National Road Championships
3rd White Spot / Delta Road Race
4th Winston-Salem Cycling Classic
10th Overall Tour of the Gila
