= Stephanie Roorda =

Canadian cyclist (born 1986)

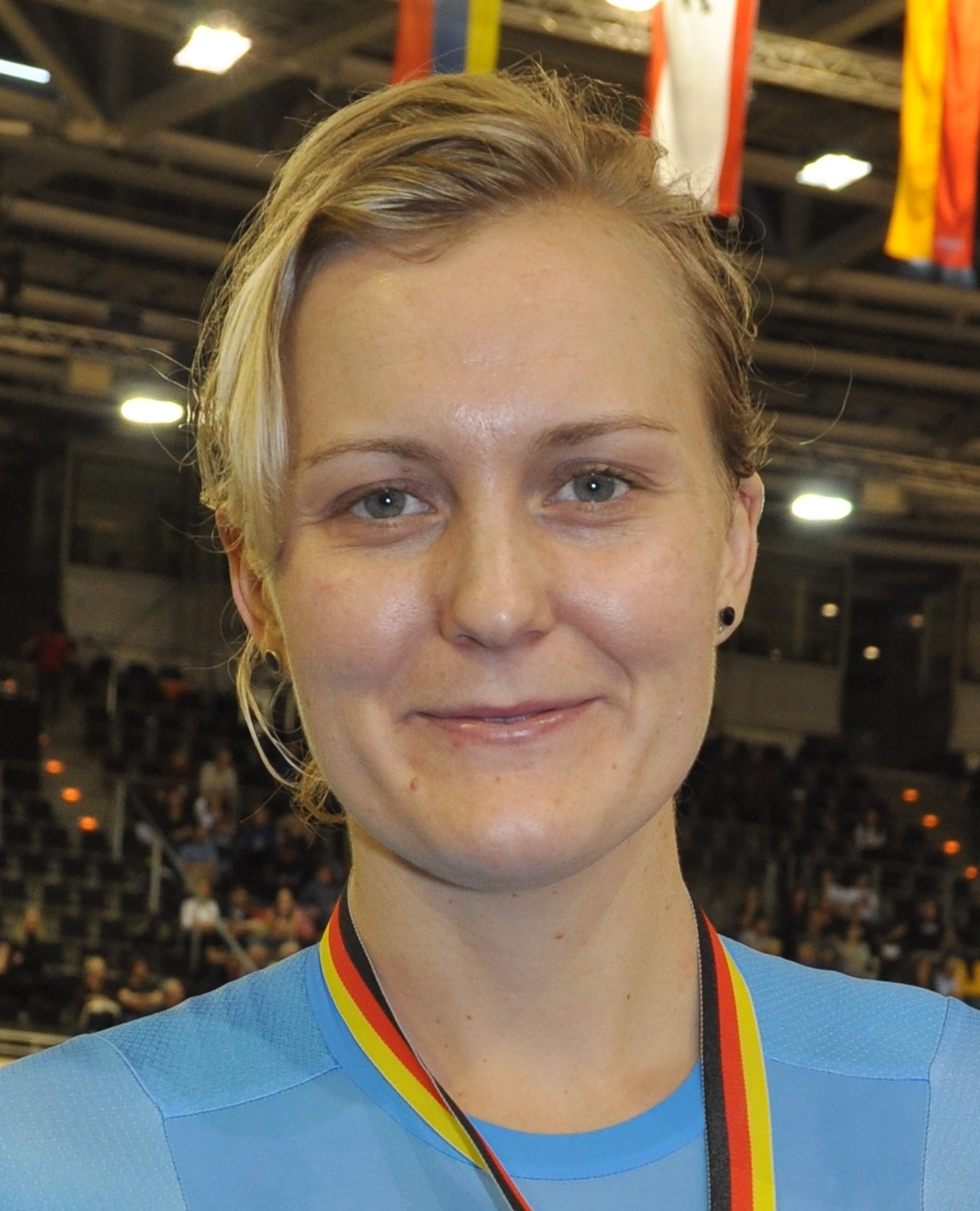
- Roorda in 2018.

Personal information
- Full name: Stephanie Roorda
- Born: 3 December 1986 (age 39) Calgary, Alberta, Canada
- Height: 171 cm (5 ft 7 in)
- Weight: 70 kg (154 lb)

Cycling career
- Sport: Cycling
- Current team: Virginia's Blue Ridge–Twenty28
- Disciplines: Road; Track
- Role: Rider

Amateur teams
- 2008: Team R.A.C.E.
- 2009: Vanderkitten Racing

Professional teams
- 2013–2015: GSD Gestion–Kallisto
- 2017–: Sho-Air Twenty20
Medal record
Representing Canada
Women's track cycling
World Championships
Silver medal – second place	2014 Cali	Team pursuit
Bronze medal – third place	2015 Yvelines	Team pursuit
Bronze medal – third place	2016 London	Scratch race
Pan American Games
Gold medal – first place	2011 Guadalajara	Team pursuit
Pan American Championships
Gold medal – first place	2015 Santiago	Points race
Gold medal – first place	2017 Balmain	Madison
Silver medal – second place	2015 Santiago	Team pursuit
Silver medal – second place	2017 Balmain	Team sprint
Silver medal – second place	2018 Aguascalientes	Madison
Bronze medal – third place	2017 Balmain	Points race
Commonwealth Games
Bronze medal – third place	2018 Gold Coast	Team pursuit

Stephanie Roorda (born 3 December 1986) is a Canadian professional racing cyclist, who currently rides for UCI Women's Team Virginia's Blue Ridge–Twenty28. She rode at the 2015 UCI Track Cycling World Championships, winning a bronze medal in the Team Pursuit.

== Major results ==
2007
National Track Championships

1st Points race
1st Keirin

2008
National Track Championships

1st Scratch
1st Team pursuit

1st Young rider classification Liberty Classic
2009
1st Team pursuit, 2009–10 UCI Track Cycling World Cup Classics, Cali
1st Team pursuit, National Track Championships
2010
1st Team pursuit, National Track Championships
3rd Team pursuit, 2009–10 UCI Track Cycling World Cup Classics, Beijing
2011
2nd Team pursuit, 2010–11 UCI Track Cycling World Cup Classics, Beijing
2013
1st Team pursuit, Los Angeles Grand Prix (with Allison Beveridge, Laura Brown, Gillian Carleton and Jasmin Glaesser)
2014
2nd Team pursuit, UCI Track World Championships
3rd Omnium, Los Angeles Grand Prix
2015
Pan American Track Championships

1st Points race
2nd Team pursuit (with Allison Beveridge, Annie Foreman-Mackey and Kirsti Lay)

2nd Omnium, Milton International Challenge
Independence Day Grand Prix

2nd Points race
3rd Scratch

Grand Prix of Colorado Springs

2nd Individual pursuit
3rd Omnium

3rd Team pursuit, UCI Track World Championships
2016
3rd Scratch, UCI Track World Championships
3rd Omnium, Track-Cycling Challenge Grenchen
