= Caroline Ryan =

Irish cyclist

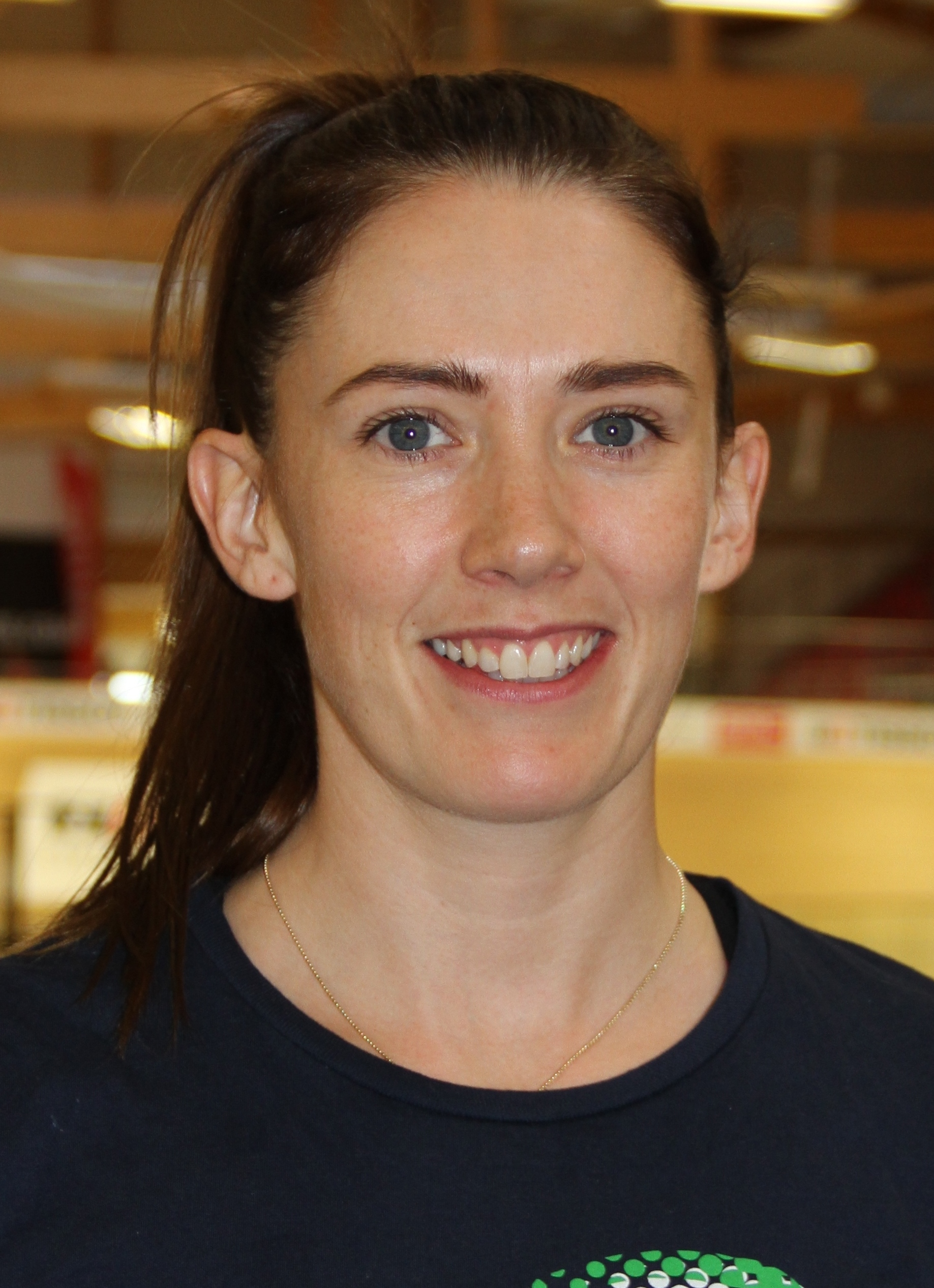
- Ryan at the 2015 UEC European Track Championships

Personal information
- Born: 10 October 1979 (age 47)
- Height: 1.76 m (5 ft 9 in)

Cycling career
- Sport: Cycling
- Current team: Retired
- Disciplines: Track; Road
- Role: Rider
- Rider type: Endurance

Amateur team
- -: Garda/Richies Bikestore/Ethos Cycling Club
Medal record
Representing Ireland
Women's track cycling
World Championship
Bronze medal – third place	2012 Melbourne	Points race

Caroline Ryan (born 10 October 1979) is an Irish former rower, and racing cyclist.

== Biography ==
In 2008, Ryan won the Princess Royal Challenge Cup (the premier women's singles sculls event) at the Henley Royal Regatta, rowing for the Garda Siochana Boat Club.

Ryan won the bronze medal in the women's points race at the 2012 UCI Track Cycling World Championships, Ireland's first medal at a senior track cycling world championship since Harry Reynolds took gold in 1896 and bronze in 1897. Ryan won the time trial at the Irish National Cycling Championships three times (2011, 2013 & 2014).

== Major results ==
2010
1st Combes Conor Memorial
2011
National Road Championships

1st Time trial
3rd Road race

National Track Championships

1st 500m time trial
1st Individual pursuit

1st Stage 5 Rás na mBan
7th Team pursuit, UEC European Track Championships (with Ciara Horne & Sinéad Jennings)
9th Individual pursuit, UCI Track Cycling World Championships
2012
UCI Track Cycling World Championships

3rd Points race
9th Individual pursuit

2013
1st Time trial, National Road Championships
1st Individual pursuit, National Track Championships
1st Dunsany GP
1st Sorrento CC I.T.T.
2nd Individual pursuit, 3 Jours d'Aigle
3rd Individual pursuit, 2013–14 UCI Track Cycling World Cup, Aguascalientes
3rd Individual pursuit, International Belgian Open
2014
1st Time trial, National Road Championships
1st Omnium, Irish International Track GP
2015
1st Individual pursuit, Irish International Track GP
3rd Time trial, National Road Championships
3rd Points race, Belgian Xmas Meetings
