= Kelly Catlin =

American cyclist (1995-2019)

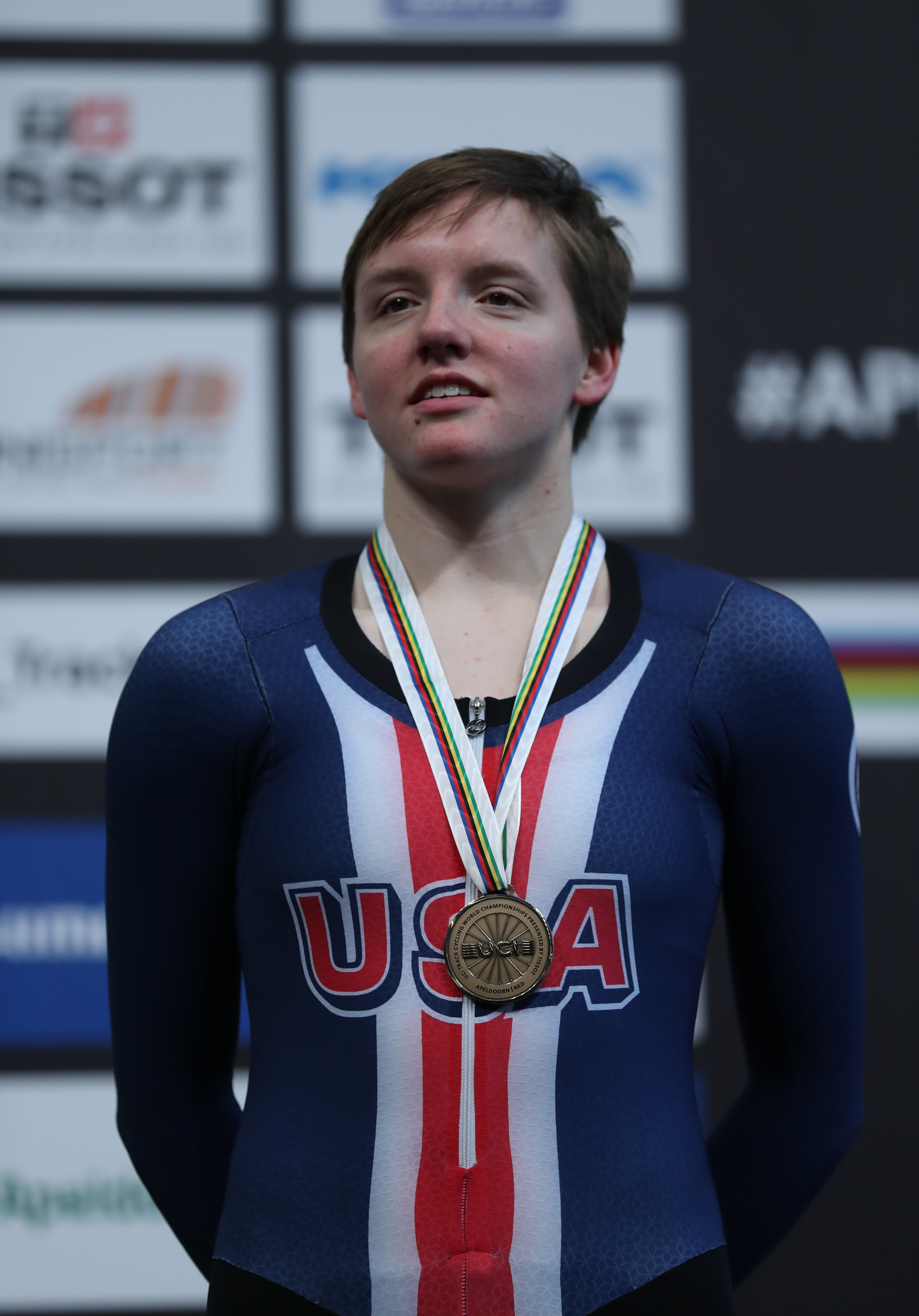
- Catlin at the 2018 UCI Track Cycling World Championships

Personal information
- Full name: Kelly Catlin
- Born: November 3, 1995 St. Paul, Minnesota, United States
- Died: March 7, 2019 (aged 23) Stanford, California, United States
- Height: 5 ft 6 in (168 cm)
- Weight: 145 lb (66 kg)

Cycling career
- Sport: Cycling
- Disciplines: Road; Track
- Role: Rider

Amateur team
- 2014–2016: NorthStar Development Cycling

Professional team
- 2017–2019: Rally Cycling
Medal record
Women's track cycling
Representing United States
Olympic Games
Silver medal – second place	2016 Rio de Janeiro	Team pursuit
World Championships
Gold medal – first place	2016 London	Team pursuit
Gold medal – first place	2017 Hong Kong	Team pursuit
Gold medal – first place	2018 Apeldoorn	Team pursuit
Bronze medal – third place	2017 Hong Kong	Individual pursuit
Bronze medal – third place	2018 Apeldoorn	Individual pursuit
Pan American Games
Silver medal – second place	2015 Toronto	Team pursuit
Pan American Championships
Gold medal – first place	2015 Santiago	Team pursuit
Gold medal – first place	2016 Aguascalientes	Individual pursuit
Gold medal – first place	2017 Couva	Individual pursuit
Gold medal – first place	2018 Aguascalientes	Individual pursuit
Gold medal – first place	2018 Aguascalientes	Team pursuit
Silver medal – second place	2015 Santiago	Individual pursuit
Women's road cycling
Pan American Games
Gold medal – first place	2015 Toronto	Time trial

Kelly Catlin (November 3, 1995 – March 7, 2019) was an American professional racing cyclist who rode for UCI Women's Team Human Powered Health. Catlin won gold medals in the women's team pursuit at the 2016, 2017, and 2018 UCI Track Cycling World Championships. She also won a silver medal in the same event at the 2016 Summer Olympics.

== Biography ==
Catlin was born in St. Paul, Minnesota; she was a triplet, with a brother and sister. She earned a degree in mathematics and Chinese from the University of Minnesota, and was studying at Stanford University for a graduate degree in computational and mathematical engineering. In addition to her career as a professional road cyclist, Catlin was an artist and a violinist.

Catlin died on March 7, 2019, at Stanford University following an episode of depression. According to her sister, she died by suicide months after suffering a concussion due to a cycling accident. The university issued a statement saying that Catlin's roommate found her dead in her on-campus residence without any sign of foul play. Following her death, her family donated Catlin's brain to the Concussion Legacy Foundation Brain Bank at Boston University for further research into concussions.

== Cycling ==
Catlin started cycling at age 17. She participated in the UCI Track Cycling World Championships three times and won gold medals in all of them. Catlin won gold medals in the women's team pursuit at the 2016, 2017, and 2018 UCI Track Cycling World Championships. She also won a silver medal in the same event at the 2016 Summer Olympics. She was a member of the women's team of Rally UHC Cycling.

== Major results ==
2015
2nd Individual pursuit, Independence Day Grand Prix
2016
1st Team pursuit, UCI Track World Championships
2nd Team pursuit, Olympic Games
2017
UCI Track World Championships

1st Team pursuit
3rd Individual pursuit

2018
UCI Track World Championships

1st Team pursuit
3rd Individual pursuit

2nd Criterium, National Road Championships
