= Stephanie Gaumnitz =

German cyclist (born 1987)

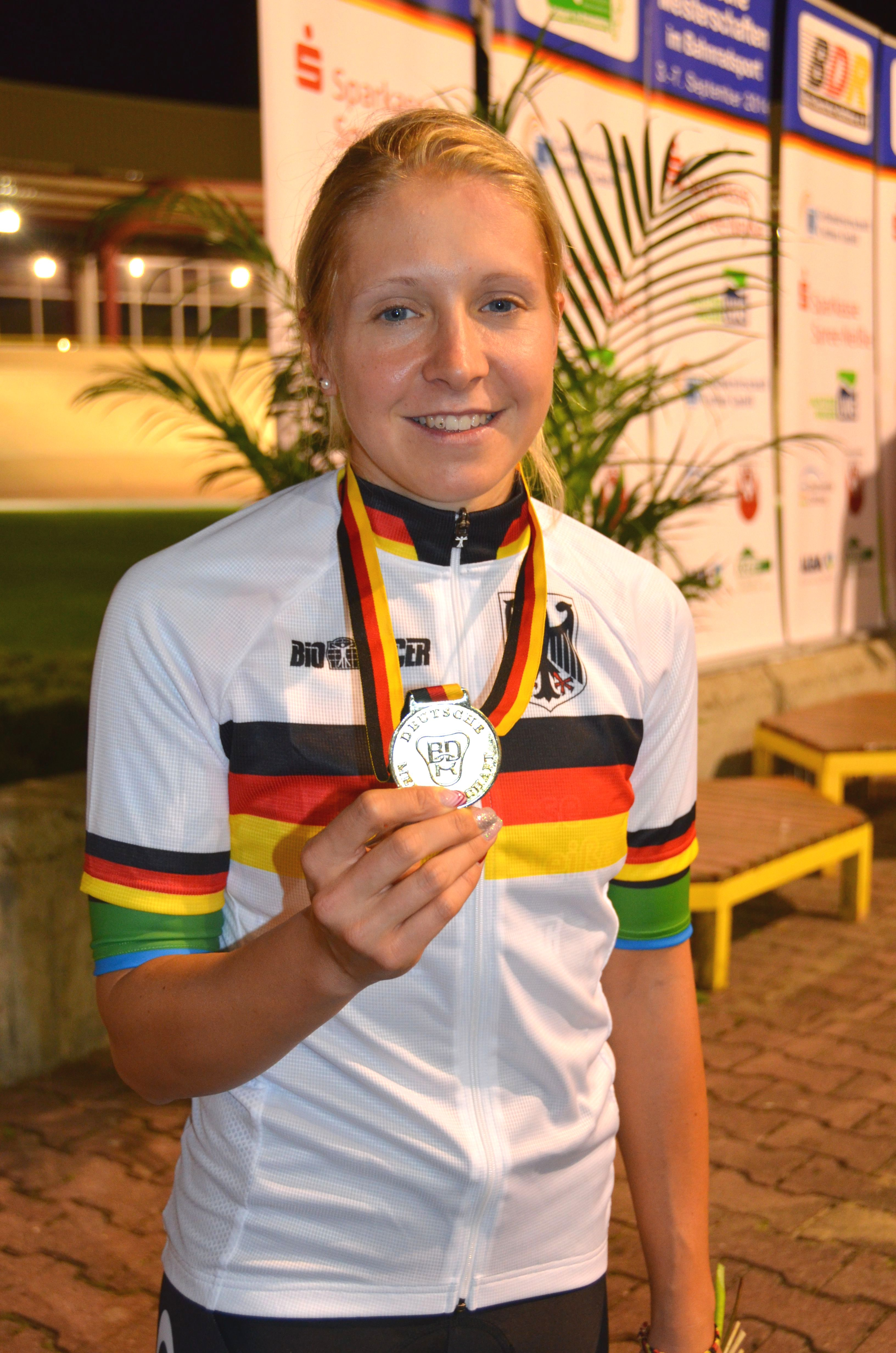
- Gaumitz in 2014

Personal information
- Born: Stephanie Pohl; 21 October 1987 (age 38) Cottbus, East Germany

Cycling career
- Sport: Cycling
- Current team: Retired
- Disciplines: Road and track
- Role: Rider

Amateur teams
- 2007: Team Getränke Hoffmann
- 2008: Brothers Bikes Team
- 2015: Euregio Ladies Cycling Team

Professional teams
- 2009–2010: Team Cycling Noris
- 2013: Team Futurumshop.nl
- 2016–2017: Cervélo–Bigla Pro Cycling
Medal record
Women's track cycling
Representing Germany
UCI Track World Championships
Gold medal – first place	2015 Yvelines	Points race
Silver medal – second place	2014 Cali	Points race
UEC European Track Championships
Gold medal – first place	2012 Panevėžys	Points race
Bronze medal – third place	2015 Grenchen	Points race
Women's road cycling
Representing Cervélo–Bigla Pro Cycling
UCI Road World Championships
Bronze medal – third place	2016 Doha	Team time trial
Bronze medal – third place	2017 Bergen	Team time trial

Stephanie Gaumnitz (née Pohl; born 21 October 1987) is a German retired racing cyclist. She rode at the 2014 UCI Road World Championships. At the 2015 UCI Track Cycling World Championships she won the gold medal in the points race.

In September 2015 the Cervélo–Bigla Pro Cycling announced that she would join them for the 2016 season. After two seasons she ended her career in September 2017.

== Major results ==
2012
1st Points Race, UEC European Track Championships
2014
2nd Points Race, UCI Track World Championships
3rd Omnium, Grand Prix of Poland
2015
1st Points Race, UCI Track World Championships
3rd Points Race, UEC European Track Championships
1st Overall Rás na mBan Tour of Ireland
2016
3rd Team Time Trial, UCI Road World Championships
2017
3rd Team Time Trial, UCI Road World Championships
