= Laura Brown (cyclist) =

Canadian cyclist

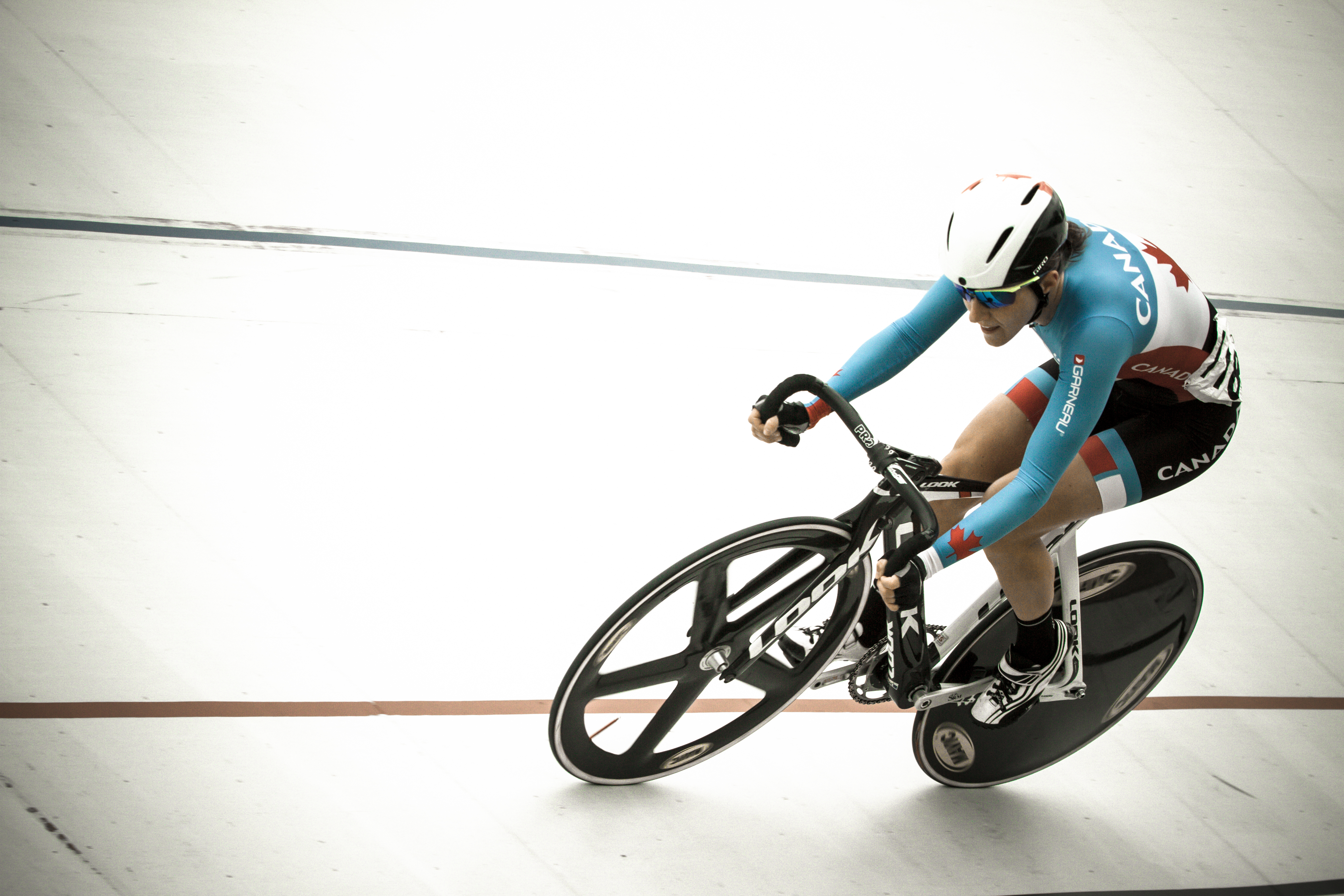
- Brown in 2013

Personal information
- Born: 27 November 1986 (age 39) Calgary, Alberta, Canada
- Height: 1.67 m (5 ft 6 in)

Cycling career
- Sport: Cycling
- Current team: UnitedHealthcare Women's Team
- Disciplines: Track and road
- Role: Rider
- Rider type: Endurance (track), time trialist (road)

Professional teams
- 2013–2014: Colavita-Fine Cooking Pro Cycling
- 2015–: UnitedHealthcare Women's Team
Medal record
Representing Canada
Women's track cycling
Olympic Games
Bronze medal – third place	2016 Rio de Janeiro	Team pursuit
World Championships
Silver medal – second place	2014 Cali	Team pursuit
Bronze medal – third place	2013 Minsk	Team pursuit
Pan American Games
Gold medal – first place	2011 Guadalaraja	Team pursuit
Gold medal – first place	2015 Toronto	Team pursuit
Women's road cycling
Pan American Games
Bronze medal – third place	2011 Guadalaraja	Time trial

Laura Brown is a Canadian cyclist who competed on the track and road including a founding member of the Canadian team pursuit team.

As a reserve, Brown was part of the Canadian team that won a bronze medal at the 2012 London Olympics in the women's team pursuit.

Laura raced on the bronze medal winning team in 2016 Rio Olympics.

She was also part of the team that won gold at the 2011 and 2015 Pan American Games in the team pursuit, as well as won a bronze medal in the Individual Time Trial.

She won the points race at the Manchester round of the 2013–14 UCI Track Cycling World Cup and finished 8th in the World Championships Omnium in 2013. She also medalled twice in the Team Pursuit at the World Championships. She held the title for the Overall World Cup leader on many occasions and won countless continental championship titles.

Laura was also a professional road racer, racing for teams such as Colavita-Fine Cooking Pro Cycling and UnitedHealthcare Women's Team. Laura won professional races on the road, including the Tour de Gila Time Trial.

Laura is now a full-time National Team Coach and Track Endurance Lead for Cycling Canada. Laura coached at the 2024 Paris Olympic Summer Games, leading the Men's Pursuit to a 7th place finish.

== Early years ==
As a young gymnast, Laura Brown always wanted to compete at the Olympic Games. But after a back injury as a teenager, she switched sports and started cycling at the Olympic Oval in Calgary. While there, she watched Canada's top speed skaters (including Clara Hughes, Catriona Le May Doan and Cindy Klassen) train before heading off to win multiple medals at Salt Lake City 2002. Those "superheroes" fired up her Olympic dream. She competed at the 2004 Junior Track World Championships and went on to compete for Canada for 10 years.
