= 2010 Team Katusha season =

2010 Team Katusha season
Manager	Andrei Tchmil
One-day victories	2
Stage race overall victories	1
Stage race stage victories	10
Previous season • Next season

The 2010 season for Team Katusha started in January with the Tour de San Luis and ended in October at the Japan Cup. As a UCI ProTour team, they were automatically invited and obliged to attend every event in the ProTour. Andrei Tchmil returns from the team's debut season as its manager. Notable rider additions for 2010 include Kim Kirchen and Joaquim Rodríguez, who have both finished in the top ten in Grand Tours.

== 2010 roster ==
Ages as of January 1, 2010.

Rider	Date of birth
Marco Bandiera (ITA)	June 12, 1984 (aged 25)
László Bodrogi (FRA)	December 11, 1976 (aged 33)
Alexander Bocharov (RUS)	February 26, 1975 (aged 34)
Pavel Brutt (RUS)	January 29, 1982 (aged 27)
Giampaolo Caruso (Note: Caruso joined the team on April 6) (ITA)	August 15, 1980 (aged 29)
Nikita Eskov (RUS)	January 23, 1983 (aged 26)
Denis Galimzyanov (RUS)	March 7, 1987 (aged 22)
Vladimir Gusev (Note: Gusev joined the team on May 5) (RUS)	July 4, 1982 (aged 27)
Joan Horrach (ESP)	March 27, 1974 (aged 35)
Mikhail Ignatiev (RUS)	May 7, 1985 (aged 24)
Sergei Ivanov (RUS)	March 5, 1975 (aged 34)
Vladimir Karpets (RUS)	September 20, 1980 (aged 29)
Mikhaylo Khalilov (UKR)	July 3, 1975 (aged 34)
Kim Kirchen (LUX)	July 3, 1978 (aged 31)
Serguei Klimov (RUS)	July 7, 1980 (aged 29)

Rider	Date of birth
Alexandr Kolobnev (RUS)	May 4, 1981 (aged 28)
Timofey Kritskiy (RUS)	January 24, 1987 (aged 22)
Luca Mazzanti (ITA)	February 4, 1974 (aged 35)
Robbie McEwen (AUS)	June 24, 1972 (aged 37)
Danilo Napolitano (ITA)	January 31, 1981 (aged 28)
Artem Ovechkin (RUS)	July 11, 1986 (aged 23)
Evgeni Petrov (RUS)	May 25, 1978 (aged 31)
Alexandre Pliuschin (MDA)	January 13, 1987 (aged 22)
Filippo Pozzato (ITA)	September 10, 1981 (aged 28)
Joaquim Rodríguez (ESP)	May 12, 1979 (aged 30)
Egor Silin (RUS)	June 25, 1988 (aged 21)
Nikolay Trusov (RUS)	July 2, 1985 (aged 24)
Stijn Vandenbergh (BEL)	April 25, 1984 (aged 25)
Maxime Vantomme (BEL)	March 8, 1986 (aged 23)
Eduard Vorganov (RUS)	December 1, 1982 (aged 27)

Riders who joined the team for the 2010 season

Rider	2009 team
Marco Bandiera	Lampre–NGC
Mikhaylo Khalilov	Ceramica Flaminia
Kim Kirchen	Team Columbia–HTC
Alexandr Kolobnev	Team Saxo Bank
Timofey Kritskiy	Continental Team Katusha
Artem Ovechkin	stagiaire (Team Katusha)
Alexandre Pliuschin	Ag2r–La Mondiale
Joaquim Rodríguez	Caisse d'Epargne
Egor Silin	neo-pro
Eduard Vorganov	Xacobeo–Galicia

Riders who left the team during or after the 2009 season

Rider	2010 team
Antonio Colom	Under suspension
Gennady Mikhaylov	Retired
Christian Pfannberger	Under suspension
Ivan Rovny	Team RadioShack
Gert Steegmans	Team RadioShack
Ben Swift	Team Sky

== One-day races ==
Before the spring season began, Team Katusha scored a victory with McEwen in the Trofeo Palma, part of the Vuelta a Mallorca quasi-stage race, as the veteran Aussie outsprinted Koldo Fernández and Óscar Freire to claim his first win since knee surgery seven months earlier.

== Grand Tours ==
Team Katusha has received invitations to all three Grand Tours in 2010.

=== Giro d'Italia ===
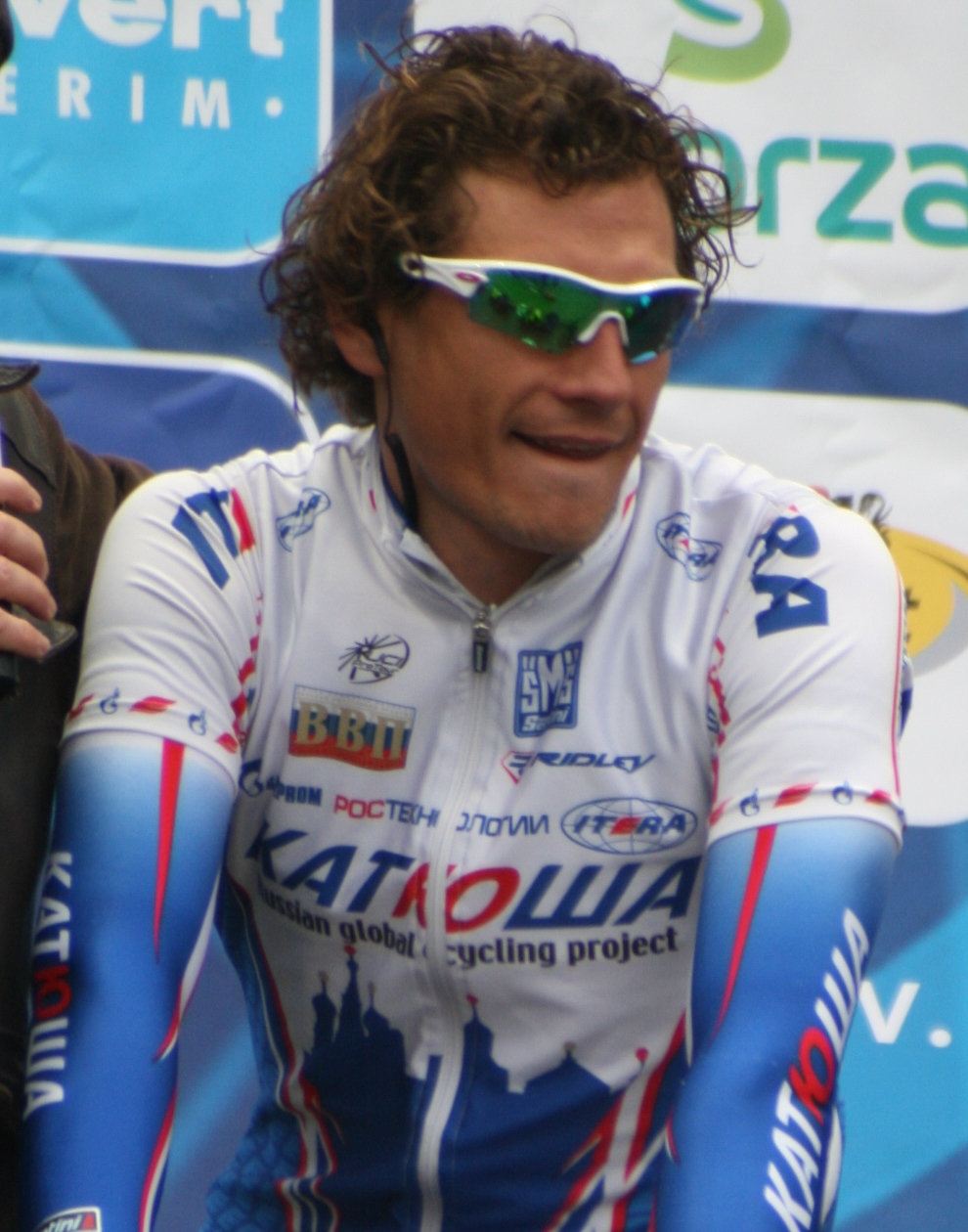
Filippo Pozzato was the first Italian to win a stage at the Giro, and it was his first career Giro stage win.

Team Katusha came to the Giro with a squad headed by McEwen, Pozzato, (both of whom would try for stage wins) and Caruso, the team's general classification hopeful. Caruso had begun the 2010 season under contract to Ceramica Flaminia, but was allowed to leave the team when they were not selected for the Giro. McEwen was present for a depleted group sprint finish to the Giro's first road race stage in Netherlands, taking seventh. He missed the selections the next day, however, and finished 57 seconds behind the leaders. Prior the transfer to Italy, the team's highest-placed rider in the overall standings was Karpets in 12th. The squad took fourth in the stage 4 team time trial, having been first when they completed their ride and bettered by only Team Sky, Team HTC–Columbia, and the winners Liquigas–Doimo. As Karpets was one of the five riders who finished together, the result moved him into seventh in the overall standings. Karpets moved up to fifth after stage 6, when sprinters Matthew Goss and André Greipel, who had been ahead of him, were unable to finish with the peloton due to the hilly parcours. The next day shuffled the standings more. Karpets lost 1'18" in the difficult, muddy stage in Tuscany, but moved up to fourth as other riders were worse off and lost even more time. In the Giro's first mountain stage, concluding with the climb up Monte Terminillo, Petrov climbed with the Giro's elite and was able to slip out the front of the group on the ascent since he did not pose an overall threat. He took fourth on the stage, seven seconds ahead of the rest of the peloton and 49 seconds back of the solo winner. Karpets was dropped on the climb and lost over a minute, falling back to seventh overall. The squad came very close again to stage wins the next two days. Pozzato made a late split in the field in stage 9 and finished second in the group sprint, just behind Goss and ahead of the Giro's only double stage winner Tyler Farrar. In stage 10, Julian Dean's leadout for Farrar caused a split within the final 500 m (1,600 ft) of the stage. McEwen was one of just eight other riders to finish with the same time as stage winner Farrar, taking fourth on the day.

Stage 11 was a very important one. More than fifty riders formed the morning's escape. Petrov, Horrach, and Caruso (who, by this point, was well out of overall contention, sitting in 51st place) made the selection. This group got a maximum time advantage over the peloton of 20 minutes. As the finish line neared, they stopped working as a cohesive group, with the prospective stage win in mind. Ten remained together into the stage's final kilometer, when Petrov rode past an early-attacking Dario Cataldo to take the win. The time gap back to the Giro's overall favorites was still nearly 13 minutes, leading to a massive re-shuffling of the overall standings. The next day, another late split in the field took place. With a field sprint seemingly shaping up, a group of ten consisting mostly of Giro favorites got away. Pozzato made this split and was the strongest sprinter present, taking the victory. Pozzato was the first Italian stage winner at the Giro, and it was his first career Giro stage win. The next day, Klimov made a winning breakaway, and finished ninth in the sprint. During this stage, Karpets launched a solo move against the peloton and stayed out in front of them between the breakaway and the main field for most of the stage. He took back two minutes on the Giro elite, moving up five places in the overall classification with the move. The squad was then quiet for the remainder of the Giro, with Petrov's tenth place in the climbing time trial to Plan de Corones the closest they came to another victory. Karpets finished the race in 14th place, 25'21" behind Giro champion Ivan Basso. Caruso was 46th, over two hours down. The squad finished ninth in the Trofeo Fast Team standings and 11th in the Trofeo Super Team.

=== Tour de France ===
Team Katusha entered the Tour de France with a squad led by Karpets. In stage 2, both Karpets and McEwen were caught up in the crashes on the Col du Stockeu in Spa, with McEwen needing medical attention to a deep wound on his elbow. The veteran Aussie stayed in the race, figuring in the mass sprint finishes to the next three stages, though finishing only as high as fourth. In stage 9, to Saint-Jean-de-Maurienne, Rodríguez finished ninth, moving into the same place in the overall standings. He gained time against a small handful of overall contenders, but he also lost two minutes to Andy Schleck and Alberto Contador, and sat five minutes behind them in the general classification.

In stage 12, Alexander Vinokourov seemed out in front on the stage-concluding climb to Mende and poised for a stage win when Contador attacked the chase group behind his teammate. Rodríguez came with him, and the two easily rode past Vinokourov. As Contador had driven their little breakaway, Rodríguez was much fresher in the final sprint, and took the stage win. The ten seconds they took on the group of contenders moved Rodríguez up to eighth overall. After Schleck and Contador engaged in a bizarre trackstand on the Port de Pailhères in stage 14, Rodríguez, who had been trailing them on the climb, caught up and finished together with them and two others, for fifth on the day. In the Tour's queen stage, stage 17 finishing at the Col du Tourmalet, Rodríguez finished third, just over a minute behind Schleck and Contador at the head of the race. He therefore took time out of every other contender in the race, and moved up in the overall standings again, to seventh. The stage 19 time trial provided for the final changes to the overall standings. The day on which it was run involved a drastic change in wind direction during the time trial, which is part of the reason Rodríguez was 154th on the day, losing ten minutes to stage winner Fabian Cancellara. He also lost considerable time to other members of the top ten in the overall standings, and slipped back to eighth, which was his final placing the next day. The squad finished 18th in the teams classification.

== Season victories ==
Date	Race	Competition	Rider	Country	Location
February 7	Trofeo Palma	UCI Europe Tour	Robbie McEwen (AUS)	Spain	Palma de Mallorca
March 28	Volta a Catalunya, Overall	UCI ProTour	Joaquim Rodríguez (ESP)	Spain	
March 28	Volta a Catalunya, Teams classification	UCI ProTour	(Note: The riders on the squad were Joaquim Rodríguez, Joan Horrach, Pavel Brutt, Vladimir Karpets, Alexandr Pliuschin, Egor Silin, Nikita Eskov, and Artem Ovechkin)	Spain	
April 3	GP Miguel Indurain	UCI Europe Tour	Joaquim Rodríguez (ESP)	Spain	Estella-Lizarra
April 9	Tour of the Basque Country, Stage 5	UCI ProTour	Joaquim Rodríguez (ESP)	Spain	Oriop
May 6	Four Days of Dunkirk, Stage 2	UCI Europe Tour	Danilo Napolitano (ITA)	France	Auby
May 19	Giro d'Italia, Stage 11	UCI World Ranking	Evgeni Petrov (RUS)	Italy	L'Aquila
May 20	Giro d'Italia, Stage 12	UCI World Ranking	Filippo Pozzato (ITA)	Italy	Porto Recanati
June 6	Tour de Luxembourg, Points classification	UCI Europe Tour	Serguei Ivanov (RUS)	Luxembourg	
July 11	Tour of Austria, Youth classification	UCI Europe Tour	Artem Ovechkin (RUS)	Austria	
July 16	Tour de France, Stage 12	UCI World Ranking	Joaquim Rodríguez (ESP)	France	Mende
July 24	Tour de Wallonie, Stage 1	UCI Europe Tour	Danilo Napolitano (ITA)	Belgium	Lessines
August 6	Vuelta a Burgos, Stage 3	UCI Europe Tour	Team time trial (Note: The riders on the squad were Alexander Bocharov, Joan Horrach, Vladimir Karpets, Serguei Klimov, Luca Mazzanti, Filippo Pozzato, Giampaolo Caruso, and Denis Galimzyanov)	Spain	Melgar de Fernamental
August 18	Eneco Tour, Stage 1	UCI ProTour	Robbie McEwen (AUS)	Netherlands	Rhenen
August 19	Tour du Limousin, Stage 3	UCI Europe Tour	Alexandre Botcharov (RUS)	France	Mansac
September 11	Vuelta a España, Stage 14	UCI World Ranking	Joaquim Rodríguez (ESP)	Spain	Peña Cabarga
September 19	Vuelta a España, Teams classification	UCI World Ranking	(Note: The riders on the squad were Joaquim Rodríguez, Vladimir Gusev, Vladimir Karpets, Alexandr Kolobnev, Filippo Pozzato, Giampaolo Caruso, Mikhail Ignatiev, Denis Galimzyanov, and Joan Horrach)	Spain	
October 18	UCI World Ranking	UCI World Ranking	Joaquim Rodríguez (ESP)		
