= 2011 Team Katusha season =

2011 Team Katusha season
Manager	Andrei Tchmil
One-day victories	4
Stage race overall victories	1
Stage race stage victories	12
Previous season • Next season

The 2011 season for Team Katusha began in January at the Tour Down Under and ended in October at the Giro di Lombardia. As a UCI ProTeam, they were automatically invited and obligated to send a squad to every event in the UCI World Tour.

Just days before the competitive season began, the team signed former Giro d'Italia winner Danilo Di Luca, who had recently regained eligibility following a doping ban. He rode in 2011 for no salary.

The team made history by sending an all-Russian selection to the Tour de France, spearheaded by third-year pro and minor 2011 breakout star Denis Galimzyanov. While the squad did not achieve anything notable at the Tour, Galimzyanov won four races on the season and the points jersey at the year's final stage race, the Tour of Beijing.

Though the team was on the whole not as successful as it was in 2010, when leader Joaquim Rodríguez was the UCI world number one rider, they had several, and varied, victories in 2011. They won four single-day races, six jersey awards at five different stage races, the overall at the Vuelta a Burgos and three stages at the Vuelta a España. Rodríguez finished fourth in the UCI standings at the end of the season, winning seven races himself. Rodríguez also had a solid spring classics campaign, finishing on the podium at both the Amstel Gold Race and La Flèche Wallonne.

== 2011 roster ==
Ages as of January 1, 2011.

Rider	Date of birth
Arkimedes Arguelyes (RUS)	July 9, 1988 (aged 22)
Pavel Brutt (RUS)	January 29, 1982 (aged 28)
Giampaolo Caruso (ITA)	August 15, 1980 (aged 30)
Danilo Di Luca (ITA)	January 2, 1976 (aged 34)
Denis Galimzyanov (RUS)	March 7, 1987 (aged 23)
Vladimir Gusev (RUS)	July 4, 1982 (aged 28)
Joan Horrach (ESP)	March 27, 1974 (aged 36)
Leif Hoste (BEL)	July 17, 1977 (aged 33)
Petr Ignatenko (RUS)	September 27, 1987 (aged 23)
Mikhail Ignatiev (RUS)	May 7, 1985 (aged 25)
Vladimir Isaichev (RUS)	April 26, 1986 (aged 24)
Sergei Ivanov (RUS)	March 5, 1975 (aged 35)
Vladimir Karpets (RUS)	September 20, 1980 (aged 30)
Alexandr Kolobnev (RUS)	May 4, 1981 (aged 29)
Aleksandr Kuschynski (BLR)	October 27, 1979 (aged 30)

Rider	Date of birth
Alberto Losada (ESP)	February 28, 1982 (aged 28)
Alexander Mironov (RUS)	January 22, 1984 (aged 26)
Daniel Moreno (ESP)	September 5, 1981 (aged 29)
Artem Ovechkin (RUS)	July 11, 1986 (aged 24)
Luca Paolini (ITA)	January 17, 1977 (aged 33)
Alexandre Pliuschin (MDA)	January 13, 1987 (aged 23)
Alexander Porsev (RUS)	February 21, 1986 (aged 24)
Filippo Pozzato (ITA)	September 10, 1981 (aged 29)
Joaquim Rodríguez (ESP)	May 12, 1979 (aged 31)
Egor Silin (RUS)	June 25, 1988 (aged 22)
Yuri Trofimov (RUS)	January 26, 1984 (aged 26)
Nikolay Trusov (RUS)	July 2, 1985 (aged 25)
Stijn Vandenbergh (BEL)	April 25, 1984 (aged 26)
Maxime Vantomme (BEL)	March 8, 1986 (aged 24)
Eduard Vorganov (RUS)	December 1, 1982 (aged 28)

Riders who joined the team for the 2011 season

Rider	2010 team
Arkimedes Arguelyes	Katusha continental team
Leif Hoste	Omega Pharma–Lotto
Petr Ignatenko	Katusha continental team
Vladimir Isaichev	Xacobeo–Galicia
Aleksandr Kuschynski	Liquigas–Doimo
Alberto Losada	Caisse d'Epargne
Alexander Mironov	Katusha continental team
Daniel Moreno	Omega Pharma–Lotto
Luca Paolini	Acqua & Sapone
Alexander Porsev	Katusha continental team
Yuri Trofimov	Bbox Bouygues Telecom

Riders who left the team during or after the 2010 season

Rider	2011 team
Marco Bandiera	Quick-Step
Alexander Bocharov	Retired
László Bodrogi	Team Type 1–Sanofi Aventis
Nikita Eskov	ASD Lunezia
Kim Kirchen	Retired
Sergey Klimov	None
Luca Mazzanti	Farnese Vini–Neri Sottoli
Robbie McEwen	Team RadioShack
Danilo Napolitano	Acqua & Sapone

== One-day races ==
=== Spring classics ===
Brutt took the team's first win of the season at the Classica Sarda on Sardinia, a race run with the same teams as the Giro di Sardegna stage race earlier in the week. He had been part of a 22-man escape group that formed after only 11 km (6.8 mi). Only 21 riders finished the race, and Brutt crossed the line first ahead of Emanuele Sella and Peter Sagan after a flurry of attacks and counterattacks in the finale. Pozzato was the team's leader at the first monument race of the season, Milan–San Remo, having been the last Italian rider to win the race (in 2006). He made the day's major selection, after a crash occurred on the Le Manie climb 90 km (56 mi) from the finish of the race. Despite not having as many support riders with him as other contenders who made the split, Pozzato made all subsequent selections as well, including an eight-rider group that formed on the Poggio and decided the race. Pozzato finished fifth in the finale sprint. Fellow contender Philippe Gilbert, who had likewise made all the selections, criticized Pozzato after the race for chasing him down multiple times in the race's final kilometers. Pozzato and Ivanov were touted as contenders at the second monument race, the Tour of Flanders. Pozzato marked two accelerations from pre-race favorite Fabian Cancellara on the cobbled climbs, but faded toward the end and finished the race with the first large group on the road over a minute down on race winner Nick Nuyens. One post-race analysis criticized Pozzato for another weak showing and suggested that internal disputes with team manager Tchmil could be to blame. The team had a notably difficult third monument, Paris–Roubaix. While Pozzato again drew mention as a pre-race contender, he and the entire team were struck hard by the notoriously difficult Paris–Roubaix terrain. Gusev was caught out in crashes as the day's principal breakaway formed, during the first cobbled sector. He did not continue in the race. Paolini also was affected by a crash, and abandoned the race from a group trying to chase to the leaders. Pozzato stayed with the group of race favorites for a time, but crashed on the Mons-en-Pévèle sector and he too left the race. In what one post-race analysis called "possibly the lowest moment in the team’s short history," not one rider from their squad so much as finished the race. The mechanical incidents sustained by riders were made worse because even the team car punctured and failed to finish the race. Pozzato in particular had been left stranded – his crash at Mons-en-Pévèle had not injured him, but he needed a full bike change to be able to continue. Neutral service vehicles only provide wheels, so he would need to wait for his team car, which was not coming.

Team leader Rodríguez rode well in the Amstel Gold Race. Katusha had been the team who did most of the work in chasing down the day's principal breakaway group, and Rodríguez effectively stayed at the front of the race most of the day. After Andy Schleck attacked for victory, Rodríguez was part of the chase group that overhauled the Luxembourger on the Cauberg, the final of the race's 31 climbs. However, it was Omega Pharma–Lotto's Philippe Gilbert who was first over the line, leaving Rodríguez second. Rodríguez admitted after the race that the finish suited Gilbert more than him, but he expected to do him better in the upcoming La Flèche Wallonne and Liège–Bastogne–Liège. La Flèche Wallonne played out almost exactly as Amstel Gold did. Rodríguez thought that the Mur de Huy climb which finished Flèche Wallonne would, due to being steeper than anything visited in the Amstel, favor him more than Gilbert, but Gilbert again took the win with Rodríguez second. He was impressed that Gilbert had attacked from far out on the Mur, and that he had held on to win after doing so. The team did not fare well at Liège–Bastogne–Liège. Rodríguez finished 26th, being affected on the day by the high pollen count in the air and had respiratory difficulties. Kolobnev finished 11th, and admitted after the race that he had been distracted and missed the crucial move from the Schleck brothers and Gilbert that had decided the race.

The team also sent squads to the Grand Prix d'Ouverture La Marseillaise, Trofeo Palma, Trofeo Cala Millor, Trofeo Palmanova, Kuurne–Brussels–Kuurne, Nokere Koerse, Gent–Wevelgem, the Brabantse Pijl, the Grand Prix de Denain and Halle–Ingooigem, but placed no higher than 11th in any of these races.

=== Fall races ===
The team also sent squads to the Coppa Bernocchi, the Vattenfall Cyclassics, the GP Ouest-France, the Grote Prijs Jef Scherens, the Grand Prix Cycliste de Québec, the Grand Prix de Fourmies and the Grand Prix Cycliste de Montréal, but placed no higher than 12th in any of these races.

== Stage races ==
After having been shut out in several stage races to open the season, Galimzyanov took the team's first stage win in the Three Days of De Panne. He bested John Degenkolb and Peter Sagan, both of whom had had multiple victories to that point in 2011, at the head of a 64-rider sprint. Adding in a second place in the road race on day three gave Galimzyanov enough points to win the event's points classification. Team leader Rodríguez won stage 1 of the Tour of the Basque Country, finishing a second clear of any other riders, but drawing Samuel Sánchez and Andreas Klöden with him. The Tour of the Basque Country does not award time bonuses at any point in the race, so the three were tied on time after the stage, and remained so after all five road race stages, with only the individual time trial remaining. Rodríguez is a vastly inferior time trialist to Sánchez and Klöden, and while his ride (33rd place out of 131 riders) was perhaps a bit better than expected, he still lost nearly two minutes and slipped from first to eleventh in the overall classification. Brutt took a strong win in the first road race stage at the Tour de Romandie. He had been part of a four-man escape group that formed only 6 km (3.7 mi) into the stage, and he soloed to victory ahead of his three former companions. He took the race lead with this stage win, and held it until the stage 4 time trial, eventually finishing the race in eighth place.

The team also won lesser classifications at the Giro di Sardegna, the Three Days of De Panne, the Critérium du Dauphiné, the Vuelta a Burgos, and the Tour of Beijing. The team also sent squads to the Tour Down Under, Étoile de Bessèges, the Tour Méditerranéen, the Tour of Qatar, the Tour of Oman, the Vuelta a Andalucía, Driedaagse van West-Vlaanderen, Paris–Nice, Tirreno–Adriatico, Volta a Catalunya, the Giro del Trentino, the Four Days of Dunkirk, the Tour of Belgium, the Tour de Suisse, the Tour of Austria, the Tour de Wallonie, the Tour de Pologne, the Eneco Tour, the Tour du Poitou Charentes, the Tour de Wallonie-Picarde and the Herald Sun Tour, but did not achieve a stage win, classification win, or podium finish in any of them.

== Season victories ==
Date	Race	Competition	Rider	Country	Location
February 26	Giro di Sardegna, Sprint classification	UCI Europe Tour	Arkimedes Arguelyes (RUS)	Italy	
February 27	Classica Sarda	UCI Europe Tour	Pavel Brutt (RUS)	Italy	Chiaramonti
March 30	Three Days of De Panne, Stage 2	UCI Europe Tour	Denis Galimzyanov (RUS)	Belgium	Koksijde
March 31	Three Days of De Panne, Points classification	UCI Europe Tour	Denis Galimzyanov (RUS)	Belgium	
April 4	Tour of the Basque Country, Stage 1	UCI World Tour	Joaquim Rodríguez (ESP)	Spain	Zumarraga
April 27	Tour de Romandie, Stage 2	UCI World Tour	Pavel Brutt (RUS)	Switzerland	Leysin
June 2	Tour de Luxembourg, Stage 1	UCI Europe Tour	Denis Galimzyanov (RUS)	Luxembourg	Bascharage
June 11	Critérium du Dauphiné, Stage 6	UCI World Tour	Joaquim Rodríguez (ESP)	France	Le Collet d'Allevard
June 12	Critérium du Dauphiné, Stage 7	UCI World Tour	Joaquim Rodríguez (ESP)	France	La Toussuire
June 12	Critérium du Dauphiné, Mountains classification	UCI World Tour	Joaquim Rodríguez (ESP)	France	
June 12	Critérium du Dauphiné, Points classification	UCI World Tour	Joaquim Rodríguez (ESP)	France	
August 4	Vuelta a Burgos, Stage 2	UCI Europe Tour	Joaquim Rodríguez (ESP)	Spain	Burgos
August 6	Vuelta a Burgos, Stage 4	UCI Europe Tour	Daniel Moreno (ESP)	Spain	Ciudad Romana de Clunia
August 7	Vuelta a Burgos, Overall	UCI Europe Tour	Joaquim Rodríguez (ESP)	Spain	
August 7	Vuelta a Burgos, Points classification	UCI Europe Tour	Joaquim Rodríguez (ESP)	Spain	
August 23	Vuelta a España, Stage 4	UCI World Tour	Daniel Moreno (ESP)	Spain	Sierra Nevada
August 24	Vuelta a España, Stage 5	UCI World Tour	Joaquim Rodríguez (ESP)	Spain	Valdepeñas de Jaén
August 27	Vuelta a España, Stage 8	UCI World Tour	Joaquim Rodríguez (ESP)	Spain	San Lorenzo de El Escorial
September 10	Paris–Brussels	UCI Europe Tour	Denis Galimzyanov (RUS)	(Note: Race held in France and Belgium.)	Brussels
October 9	Tour of Beijing, Stage 5	UCI World Tour	Denis Galimzyanov (RUS)	China	Beijing
October 9	Tour of Beijing, Points classification	UCI World Tour	Denis Galimzyanov (RUS)	China	
October 9	Gran Premio Bruno Beghelli	UCI Europe Tour	Filippo Pozzato (ITA)	Italy	Monteveglio
October 13	Giro del Piemonte	UCI Europe Tour	Daniel Moreno (ESP)	Italy	Novi Ligure
