= List of Irish records in track cycling =

The following are the national records in track cycling in Ireland maintained by Ireland's national cycling federation: Cycling Ireland.

== Men ==
Key to tables: Awaiting ratification Record not kept by Cycling Ireland

Event	Record	Athlete	Date	Meet	Place	Ref
Flying 200m time trial	9.834	Eoin Mullen	6 December 2013	World Cup	Aguascalientes, Mexico	
250m time trial (standing start)	20.196	Maximilian Fitzgerald	2 February 2026	European Championships	Konya, Turkey	
Flying 500m time trial	26.590	Kieran Leahy	7 April 2019			
1km time trial	1:01.804	Maximilian Fitzgerald	2 February 2026	European Championships	Konya, Turkey	
Team sprint						
4000m individual pursuit	4:20.260	Martyn Irvine	21 February 2013	World Championships	Minsk, Belarus	
4000m team pursuit	4:11.539	Fintan Ryan; Sean Downey; Felix English; Martyn Irvine	14 October 2015	European Championships	Grenchen, Switzerland	
Hour record	48.469 km	Greg Swinand	16 November 2017		Aguascalientes, Mexico	

== Women ==
Event	Record	Athlete	Date	Meet	Place	Ref
Flying 200m time trial	10.900	Orla Walsh	14 August 2022	European Championships	Munich, Germany	
250m time trial (standing start)	20.085	Orla Walsh	9 July 2022	Nations Cup	Cali, Colombia	
Flying 500m time trial						
500m time trial	34.468	Orla Walsh	9 July 2022	Nations Cup	Cali, Colombia	
1 km time trial	1:07.229	Emma Jeffers	4 February 2026	European Championship	Konya, Turkey	
Team sprint (500 m)	35.884	Robyn Stewart; Eimear Moran	6 November 2016	World Cup	Glasgow, United Kingdom	
3000m individual pursuit	3:25.142	Kelly Murphy	2 March 2024		Brisbane, Australia	
4000m individual pursuit	4:40.390	Fiona Mangan	25 October 2025	World Championships	Santiago, Chile	
3000m team pursuit	3:30.375	Jennifer O'Reilly; Ciara Horne; Caroline Ryan	18 February 2011	World Cup	Manchester, United Kingdom	
4000m team pursuit	4:12.447	Lara Gillespie; Mia Griffin; Kelly Murphy; Alice Sharpe	6 August 2024	Olympic Games	Saint-Quentin-en-Yvelines, France	
Hour record						
