= 2014 UCI Track Cycling World Championships – Men's scratch =

The Men's scratch at the 2014 UCI Track Cycling World Championships was held on 27 February 2014. 20 cyclists participated in the contest, which was contested over 60 laps, equating to a distance of 15 km (9.3 mi).

== Medalists ==
Gold	Ivan Kovalev (RUS)
Silver	Martyn Irvine (IRL)
Bronze	Cheung King Lok (HKG)

== Results ==
The race was started at 19:25.

Rank	Name	Nation	Laps down
1st place, gold medalist(s)	Ivan Kovalev	Russia	
2nd place, silver medalist(s)	Martyn Irvine	Ireland	
3rd place, bronze medalist(s)	Cheung King Lok	Hong Kong	
4	Roman Lutsyshyn	Ukraine	−1
5	Nolan Hoffman	South Africa	−1
6	Maximilian Beyer	Germany	−1
7	Dylan Kennett	New Zealand	−1
8	Glenn O'Shea	Australia	−1
9	Tim Veldt	Netherlands	−1
10	Frank Pasche	Switzerland	−1
11	Andreas Müller	Austria	−1
12	Moreno De Pauw	Belgium	−1
13	Jonathan Dibben	Great Britain	−1
14	Elia Viviani	Italy	−1
15	Martin Bláha	Czech Republic	−1
16	Vivien Brisse	France	−1
17	Anton Muszychkin	Belarus	−1
18	Alberto Covarrubias	Mexico	−1
19	Julio Amores	Spain	−1
	Jordan Parra	Colombia	REL
