= 2012 UCI Track Cycling World Championships – Women's keirin =

Rainbow jersey

The Women's keirin at the 2012 UCI Track Cycling World Championships was held on April 7. 22 athletes participated in the contest. After the 4 qualifying heats, the 2 fastest riders in each heat advanced to the second round. The riders that did not advance to the second round raced in 4 repechage heats. The first rider in each heat advanced to the second round along with the 8 that qualified before.

The first 3 riders from each of the 2 Second Round heats advanced to the Final and the remaining riders raced a consolation 7–12 final.

== Medalists ==
Gold	Anna Meares (AUS)
Silver	Ekaterina Gnidenko (RUS)
Bronze	Kristina Vogel (GER)

== Results ==
=== First round ===
The first round was held at 14:15.

==== Heat 1 ====
Rank	Name	Nation	Notes
1	Anna Meares	Australia	Q
2	Kristina Vogel	Germany	Q
3	Lee Wai Sze	Hong Kong	
4	Natasha Hansen	New Zealand	
5	Willy Kanis	Netherlands	

==== Heat 2 ====
Rank	Name	Nation	Notes
1	Clara Sanchez	France	Q
2	Kaarle McCulloch	Australia	Q
3	Victoria Pendleton	Great Britain	
4	Miriam Welte	Germany	
5	Viktoria Baranova	Russia	

==== Heat 3 ====
Rank	Name	Nation	Notes
1	Guo Shuang	China	Q
2	Sandie Clair	France	Q
3	Simona Krupeckaitė	Lithuania	
4	Monique Sullivan	Canada	
5	Katie Schofield	New Zealand	
6	Olena Tsyos	Ukraine	

==== Heat 4 ====
Rank	Name	Nation	Notes
1	Di Mu	China	Q
2	Fatehah Mustapa	Malaysia	Q
3	Lisandra Guerra	Cuba	
4	Ekaterina Gnidenko	Russia	
5	Daniela Larreal	Venezuela	
6	Maryia Lohvinava	Belarus	

=== First Round Repechage ===
The first round repechage was held at 15:40.

==== Heat 1 ====
Rank	Name	Nation	Notes
1	Ekaterina Gnidenko	Russia	Q
2	Lee Wai Sze	Hong Kong	
3	Katie Schofield	New Zealand	

==== Heat 2 ====
Rank	Name	Nation	Notes
1	Victoria Pendleton	Great Britain	Q
2	Monique Sullivan	Canada	
3	Viktoria Baranova	Russia	

==== Heat 3 ====
Rank	Name	Nation	Notes
1	Simona Krupeckaitė	Lithuania	Q
2	Willy Kanis	Netherlands	
3	Miriam Welte	Germany	
4	Maryia Lohvinava	Belarus	

==== Heat 4 ====
Rank	Name	Nation	Notes
1	Olena Tsyos	Ukraine	Q
2	Lisandra Guerra	Cuba	
3	Natasha Hansen	New Zealand	
4	Daniela Larreal	Venezuela	

=== Second round ===
The second round was held at 19:30.

==== Heat 1 ====
Rank	Name	Nation	Notes
1	Anna Meares	Australia	Q
2	Di Mu	China	Q
3	Ekaterina Gnidenko	Russia	Q
4	Kaarle McCulloch	Australia	
5	Sandie Clair	France	
6	Olena Tsyos	Ukraine	

==== Heat 2 ====
Rank	Name	Nation	Notes
1	Clara Sanchez	France	Q
2	Guo Shuang	China	Q
3	Kristina Vogel	Germany	Q
4	Fatehah Mustapa	Malaysia	
5	Simona Krupeckaitė	Lithuania	
6	Victoria Pendleton	United Kingdom	

=== Finals ===
The finals were held at 20:20.

==== Small Final ====
Rank	Name	Nation	Notes
7	Sandie Clair	France	
8	Simona Krupeckaitė	Lithuania	
9	Kaarle McCulloch	Australia	
10	Olena Tsyos	Ukraine	
11	Fatehah Mustapa	Malaysia	
12	Victoria Pendleton	United Kingdom	

==== Final ====
Rank	Name	Nation	Notes
1st place, gold medalist(s)	Anna Meares	Australia	
2nd place, silver medalist(s)	Ekaterina Gnidenko	Russia	
3rd place, bronze medalist(s)	Kristina Vogel	Germany	
4	Guo Shuang	China	
5	Clara Sanchez	France	
6	Di Mu	China	
