= 2013 UCI Track Cycling World Championships – Men's individual pursuit =

Men's individual pursuit at the 2013 UCI Track Cycling World Championships
- Venue: Minsk-Arena
- Location: Minsk, Belarus
- Dates: 21 February 2013
- Winning time: 4:16.733

Medalists
gold medal	Michael Hepburn	Australia
silver medal	Martyn Irvine	Ireland
bronze medal	Stefan Küng	Switzerland

The Men's individual pursuit at the 2013 UCI Track Cycling World Championships was held on February 21. Twenty-three athletes participated in the contest. After the qualification, the two fastest riders advanced to the Final and the 3rd- and 4th-fastest riders raced for the bronze medal.

== Results ==
=== Qualifying ===
The Qualifying was held at 13:00.

Rank	Name	Nation	Time	Notes
1	Michael Hepburn	Australia	4:18.456	Q
2	Martyn Irvine	Ireland	4:20.260	Q
3	Stefan Küng	Switzerland	4:22.530	Q
4	Alexander Morgan	Australia	4:22.785	Q
5	Jenning Huizenga	Netherlands	4:23.278	
6	Alexander Serov	Russia	4:23.864	
7	Rasmus Quaade	Denmark	4:24.059	
8	Sebastián Mora Vedri	Spain	4:24.723	
9	Dominique Cornu	Belgium	4:27.268	
10	Dias Omirzakov	Kazakhstan	4:28.222	
11	Asier Maeztu Billelabeitia	Spain	4:28.481	
12	Kersten Thiele	Germany	4:28.681	
13	Ivan Savitskiy	Russia	4:31.451	
14	Maximilian Beyer	Germany	4:31.454	
15	Ondrej Vendolsky	Czech Republic	4:31.776	
16	Marco Coledan	Italy	4:32.148	
17	Steven Burke	Great Britain	4:32.153	
18	Dion Beukeboom	Netherlands	4:32.738	
19	Jonas Rickaert	Belgium	4:33.435	
20	Thomas Boudat	France	4:34.284	
21	Vladimir Tuychiev	Uzbekistan	4:37.400	
22	Roman Furst	Czech Republic	4:39.909	
23	Ignat Malei	Belarus	4:44.370	

=== Finals ===
The finals were held at 19:45.

==== Small Final ====
Rank	Name	Nation	Time	Notes
3rd place, bronze medalist(s)	Stefan Küng	Switzerland	4:22.841	
4	Alexander Morgan	Australia	4:26.800	

==== Final ====
Rank	Name	Nation	Time	Notes
1st place, gold medalist(s)	Michael Hepburn	Australia	4:16.733	
2nd place, silver medalist(s)	Martyn Irvine	Ireland	4:24.528	
