= 2005–06 UCI Track Cycling World Cup Classics =

International track cycling competition

The 2005–2006 UCI Track Cycling World Cup Classics is a multi race tournament over a season of track cycling. The season ran from November 4, 2005, to May 16, 2006. The World Cup is organised by the UCI.

== Results ==
=== Men ===
Event	Winner	Second	Third
Russia, Moscow — November 4–6, 2005
Keirin	Andriy Vynokurov (UKR)	Łukasz Kwiatkowski (POL)	Adam Ptáčník (CZE)
1 km time trial	Jason Queally (GBR)	Carsten Bergemann (GER)	Alois Kaňkovský (CZE)
Scratch	Ivan Kovalev (RUS)	Andreas Müller (GER)	Jérôme Neuville (FRA)
Individual pursuit	Jens Mouris (NED)	Mark Jamieson (AUS)	Alexander Serov (RUS)
Team pursuit	Australia; Peter Dawson; Matthew Harley Goss; Ashley Hutchinson; Mark Jamieson	Russia; Serguei Klimov; Anton Mindlin; Alexander Serov; Nikolai Trussov	Ukraine; Andriy Kutalo; Roman Kononenko; Vitaliy Popkov; Volodymyr Zagorodniy
Sprint	Stefan Nimke (GER)	Craig MacLean (GBR)	Takashi Kaneko (JPN)
Points race	Sebastian Cancio (ARG)	Colby Pearce (USA)	Petr Lazar (CZE)
Team sprint	Germany; Carsten Bergemann; Matthias John; Stefan Nimke	Great Britain; Chris Hoy; Craig MacLean; Jason Queally	Spain; José Antonio Escuredo; Salvador Meliá Mangriñan; José Antonio Villanueva
Madison	Russia; Mikhail Ignatiev; Nikolai Trussov	Germany; Guido Fulst; Leif Lampater	Belgium; Kenny De Ketele; Steve Schets
Great Britain, Manchester — December 9–11, 2005
Keirin	Maximilian Levy (GER)	José Antonio Escuredo (ESP)	Josiah Ng Onn Lam (MYS)
1 km time trial	Chris Hoy (GBR)	Jason Queally (GBR)	Tim Veldt (NED)
Scratch	Rafat Ratajczyk (POL)	Matthew Gilmore (BEL)	Ioannis Tamouridis (GRE)
Individual pursuit	Paul Manning (GBR)	Volodymyr Dyudya (UKR)	Levi Heimans (NED)
Team pursuit	New Zealand; Jason Allen; Hayden Godfrey; Timothy Gudsell; Marc Ryan	Great Britain; Mark Cavendish; Rob Hayles; Paul Manning; Chris Newton	Netherlands; Levi Heimans; Jens Mouris; Wim Stroetinga; Niki Terpstra
Sprint	Theo Bos (NED)	Teun Mulder (NED)	Mickaël Bourgain (FRA)
Points race	Guido Fulst (GER)	Peter Schep (NED)	Martin Bláha (CZE)
Team sprint	Great Britain; Ross Edgar; Chris Hoy; Craig MacLean	Netherlands; Theo Bos; Teun Mulder; Tim Veldt	Germany; Maximilian Levy; Benjamin Wittmann; Robert Förstemann
Madison	Germany; Guido Fulst; Leif Lampater	Russia; Mikhail Ignatiev; Nikolai Trussov	Great Britain; Mark Cavendish; Rob Hayles
United States, Carson — January 20–22, 2006
Keirin	Shane John Kelly (AUS)	Teun Mulder (NED)	Jamie Staff (GBR)
1 km time trial	Ben Kersten (AUS)	Tim Veldt (NED)	François Pervis (FRA)
Scratch	Walter Pérez (ARG)	Ivan Kovalev (RUS)	Taiji Nishitani (JPN)
Individual pursuit	Sergio Escobar Roure (ESP)	Jens Mouris (NED)	Jason Allen (NZL)
Team pursuit	Russia; Serguey Klimov; Ivan Rovny; Alexander Serov; Nikolay Trussov	Netherlands; Levi Heimans; Geert-Jan Jonkman; Jens Mouris; Niki Terpstra	Spain; Sergio Escobar Roure; Guillermo Ferrer Garcia; David Muntaner Juaneda; Carlos Torrent Tarres
Sprint	Grégory Baugé (FRA)	Mickaël Bourgain (FRA)	Michael Blatchford (USA)
Points race	Mikhail Ignatiev (RUS)	Ioannis Tamouridis (GRE)	Joan Llaneras Rossello (ESP)
Team sprint	France; Grégory Baugé; Mickaël Bourgain; François Pervis	Poland; Łukasz Kwiatkowski; Krzysztof Szymanek; Damian Zieliński	Australia; Ryan Bayley; Shane John Kelly; Shane Perkins
Madison	Argentina; Dario Colla; Walter Pérez	Netherlands; Jens Mouris; Niki Terpstra	Russia; Mikhail Ignatiev; Nikolay Trussov
Australia, Sydney — March 3–5, 2005
Keirin	Theo Bos (NED)	Josiah Ng On Lam (MYS)	Jan van Eijden (GER)
1 km time trial	Yong Feng (CHN)	François Pervis (FRA)	Joel Leonard (AUS)
Scratch	Rafał Ratajczyk (POL)	Sun Jae Jang (KOR)	Alexander Khatuntsev (RUS)
Individual pursuit	Rob Hayles (GBR)	Alexander Khatuntsev (RUS)	Michael Ford (AUS)
Team pursuit	Denmark; Casper Jørgensen; Jens-Erik Madsen; Michael Mørkøv; Alex Rasmussen	Ukraine; Lyubomyr Polatayko; Maksym Polyshchuk; Vitaliy Popkov; Vitaliy Shchedov	Great Britain; Edward Clancy; Ian Stannard; Andy Tennant; Geraint Thomas
Sprint	Grégory Baugé (FRA)	Damian Zieliński (POL)	Arnaud Tournant (FRA)
Points race	Niki Terpstra (NED)	Kazuhiro Mori (JPN)	Chris Newton (GBR)
Team sprint	Netherlands; Theo Bos; Teun Mulder; Tim Veldt	France; Grégory Baugé; François Pervis; Arnaud Tournant	Japan; Masaki Inoue; Takashi Kaneko; Kazunari Watanabe
Madison	Denmark; Michael Mørkøv; Alex Rasmussen	Italy; Fabio Masotti; Marco Villa	Great Britain; Mark Cavendish; Geraint Thomas

=== Women ===
Event	Winner	Second	Third
Russia, Moscow — November 4–6, 2005
Keirin	Tamilla Abassova (RUS)	Christin Muche (GER)	Mu Di (CHN)
500 m time trial	Natallia Tsylinskaya (BLR)	Simona Krupeckaitė (LTU)	Tamilla Abassova (RUS)
Scratch	Yoanka González (CUB)	Lyudmyla Vypyraylo (UKR)	Belinda Goss (AUS)
Individual pursuit	Li Meifang (CHN)	Wendy Houvenaghel (GBR)	Olga Slyusareva (RUS)
Sprint	Natallia Tsylinskaya (BLR)	Victoria Pendleton (GBR)	Christin Muche (GER)
Points race	Olga Slyusareva (RUS)	Yoanka González (CUB)	Lada Kozlíková (CZE)
Great Britain, Manchester — December 9–11, 2005
Keirin	Clara Sanchez (FRA)	Elisa Frisoni (ITA)	Victoria Pendleton (GBR)
500 m time trial	Natallia Tsylinskaya (BLR)	Yvonne Hijgenaar (NED)	Victoria Pendleton (GBR)
Scratch	Adrie Visser (NED)	Katherine Bates (AUS)	Gema Pascual Torrecilla (ESP)
Individual pursuit	Katherine Bates (AUS)	Sarah Hammer (USA)	Larissa Kleinmann (GER)
Sprint	Victoria Pendleton (GBR)	Natallia Tsylinskaya (BLR)	Guo Shuang (CHN)
Points race	Sarah Hammer (USA)	Yan Li (CHN)	Gema Pascual Torrecilla (ESP)
United States, Carson — January 20–22, 2006
Keirin	Clara Sanchez (FRA)	Guo Shuang (CHN)	Elisa Frisoni (ITA)
500 m time trial	Natallia Tsylinskaya (BLR)	Guo Shuang (CHN)	Yvonne Hijgenaar (NED)
Scratch	Sarah Hammer (USA)	Rebecca Quinn (USA)	Yulia Arustamova (RUS)
Individual pursuit	Sarah Hammer (USA)	María Luisa Calle (COL)	Yulia Arustamova (RUS)
Sprint	Natallia Tsylinskaya (BLR)	Clara Sanchez (FRA)	Guo Shuang (CHN)
Points race	Giorgia Bronzini (ITA)	Rebecca Quinn (USA)	Yan Li (CHN)
Australia, Sydney — March 3–5, 2006
Keirin	Mu Di (CHN)	Jennie Reed (USA)	Elisa Frisoni (ITA)
500 m time trial	Yvonne Hijgenaar (NED)	Elisa Frisoni (ITA)	Tamilla Abassova (RUS)
Scratch	Yulia Aroustamova (RUS)	Jarmila Machačová (CZE)	Alena Prudnikova (RUS)
Individual pursuit	Wendy Houvenaghel (GBR)	Li Wang (CHN)	Kristin Armstrong (USA)
Sprint	Anna Meares (AUS)	Jennie Reed (USA)	Elisa Frisoni (ITA)
Points race	Vera Carrara (ITA)	Leire Olaberria Dorronsoro (ESP)	Nikki Harris (GBR)
