= 2013 UEC European Track Championships – Men's points race =

Men's points race at the 2013 UEC European Track Championships
- UEC European Champion jersey
- Venue: Omnisport Apeldoorn, Apeldoorn
- Date: 18 October
- Competitors: 24 from 15 nations

Medalists
gold medal	Elia Viviani	Italy
silver medal	Thomas Boudat	France
bronze medal	Eloy Teruel	Spain

The Men's points race was held on 18 October 2013. 24 riders participated over a distance of 40 km (160 laps), with sprints every 10 laps awarding 5, 3, 2 or 1 point to the first four; 20 points are also awarded/withdrawn for each lap gained/lost respectively.

== Results ==
Rank	Name	Nation	Sprint points	Lap points	Finish order	Total points
1st place, gold medalist(s)	Elia Viviani	Italy	36	40	11	76
2nd place, silver medalist(s)	Thomas Boudat	France	24	40	6	64
3rd place, bronze medalist(s)	Eloy Teruel	Spain	11	40	7	51
4	Kenny De Ketele	Belgium	13	20	4	33
5	Sebastián Mora	Spain	11	20	2	31
6	Wim Stroetinga	Netherlands	10	20	1	30
7	Milan Kadlec	Czech Republic	9	20	8	29
8	Wojciech Pszczolarski	Poland	7	20	9	27
9	Kirill Sveshnikov	Russia	5	20	15	25
10	Anton Muzychkin	Belarus	4	20	3	24
11	Jesper Asselman	Netherlands	1	20	12	21
12	Patrick Konrad	Austria	11	0	14	11
13	Vivien Brisse	France	6	0	17	6
14	Roman Lutsyshyn	Ukraine	5	0	5	5
15	Theo Reinhardt	Germany	3	0	13	3
16	Oleksandr Martynenko	Ukraine	0	0	10	0
17	Marco Coledan	Italy	11	-20	16	-9
18	Tristan Marguet	Switzerland	0	-20	—	-20
19	Vojtěch Hačecký	Czech Republic	2	-40	—	-38
—	Viktor Manakov	Russia	5	0	—	DNF
—	Rafał Jeziorski	Poland	0	0	—	DNF
—	Martyn Irvine	Ireland	0	0	—	DNF
—	Jonathan Dibben	Great Britain	0	0	—	DNF
—	Jonas Rickaert	Belgium	2	0	—	DSQ
