= BBC Northern Ireland Sports Personality of the Year =

- Country: Northern Ireland
- Presented by: BBC Northern Ireland
- First award: 2003; 23 years ago
- Currently held by: Rory McIlroy (2025)
- Related: BBC Sports Personality of the Year

The BBC Northern Ireland Sports Personality of the Year is an annual sports award organised by BBC Northern Ireland. It was first awarded in 2003, and has been awarded annually ever since, with the exception of 2016.

The award is conspicuously awarded to athletes whether they represent all of Ireland, Northern Ireland, Great Britain and Northern Ireland or even the Republic of Ireland or Europe (e.g. in golf), so long as they are from Northern Ireland. As of 2025, Rory McIlroy holds the record for most titles, with four. Golf, with five awardees, is the most successful sport at the awards.

== Winners ==
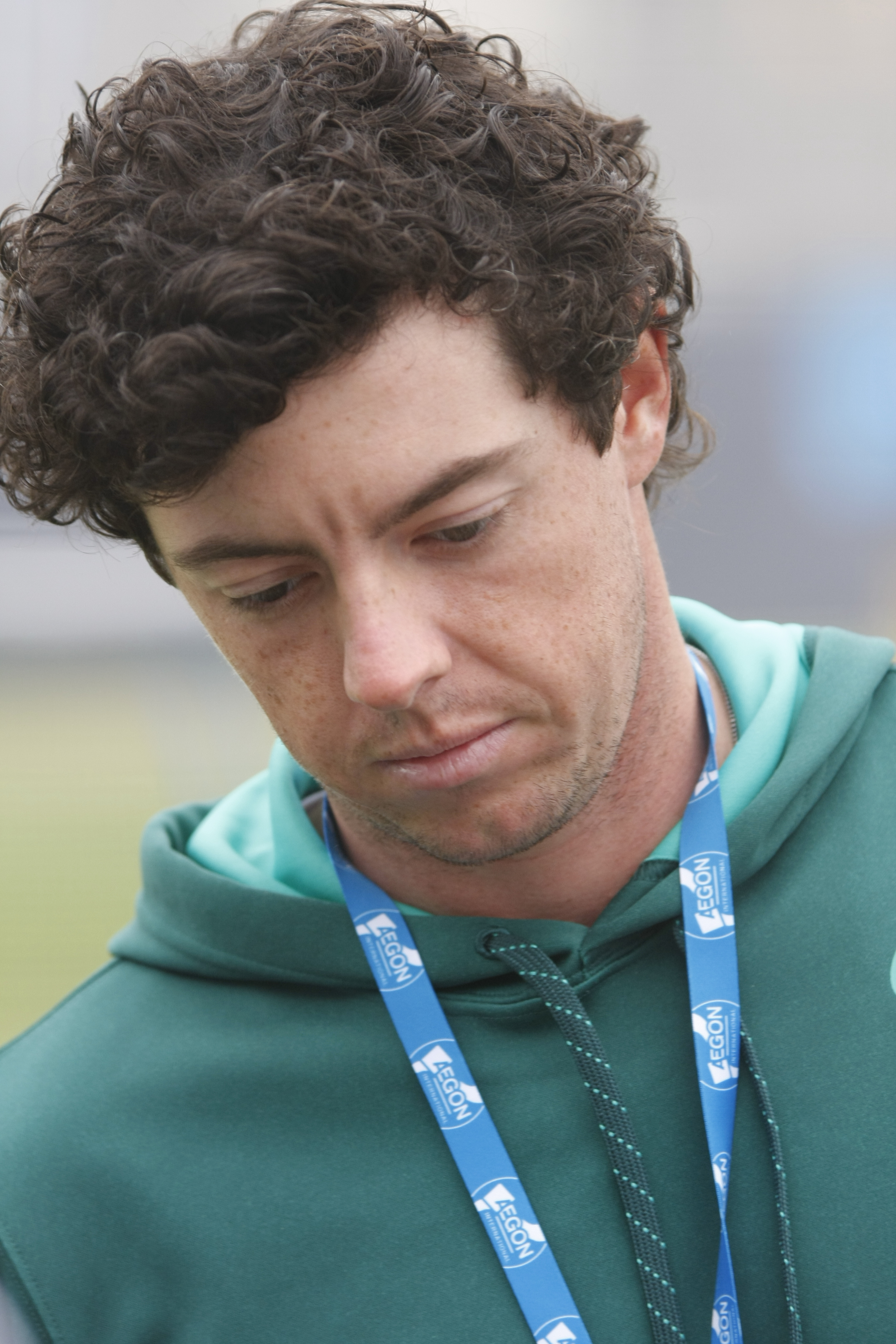
Rory McIlroy, four-time winner

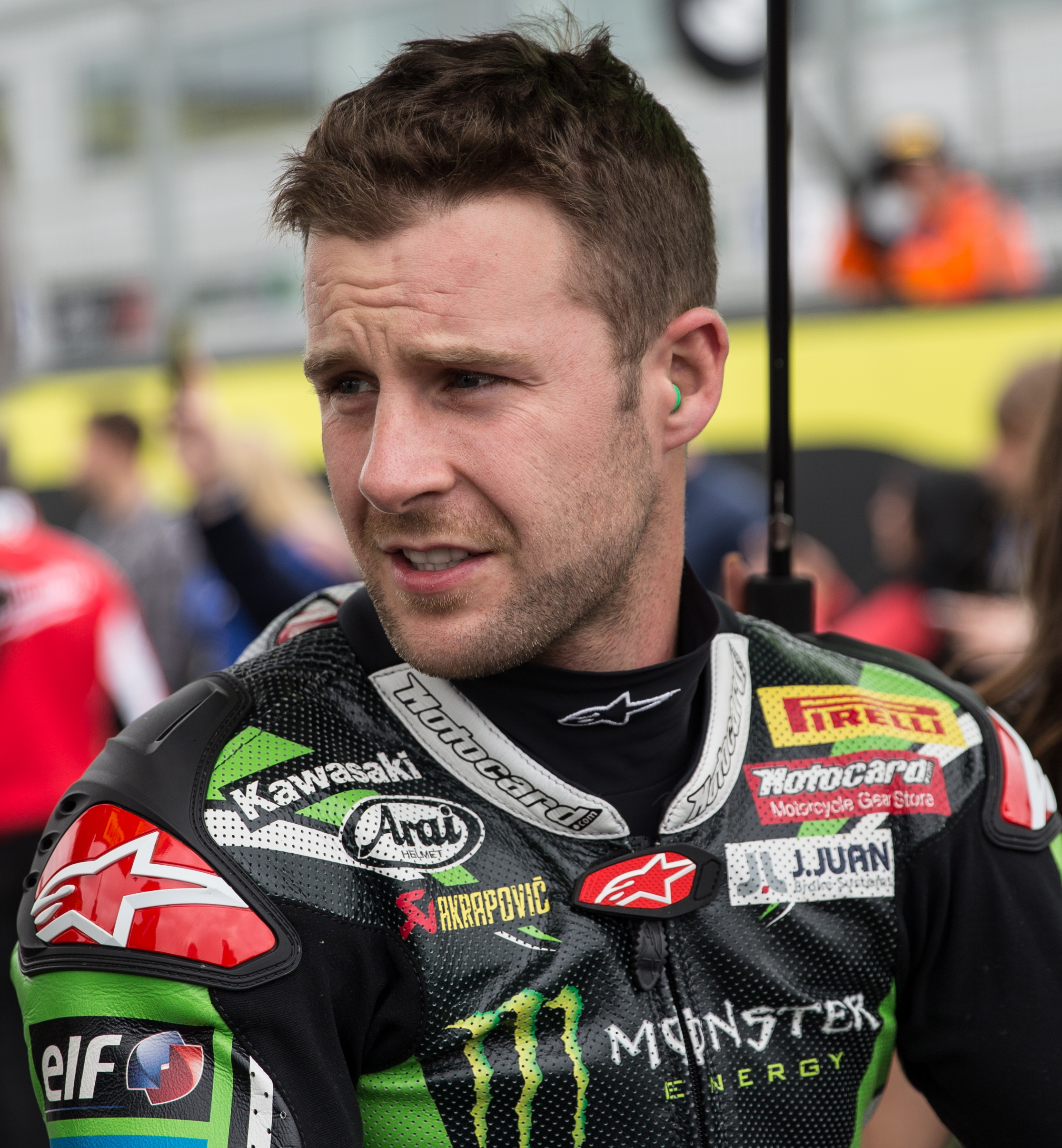
Jonathan Rea, three-time winner

Year	Winner	Sport	Rationale	Ref.
2003	Peter Canavan	Gaelic football	Won the 2003 All-Ireland with Tyrone.	
2004	Margaret Johnston	Lawn bowls	Won a third outdoor World Bowls Championship singles.	
2005	David Healy	Association football	Scored the only goal in iconic 1-0 victory over England at Windsor Park.	
2006	Darren Clarke	Golf	Key role in winning 2006 Ryder Cup with Europe while grieving loss of his wife, Heather.	
2007	David Healy	Association football	Scored a hat-trick against Spain in Euro 2008 qualification. Ended as top scorer with 13 goals.	
2008	Sean Cavanagh	Gaelic football	Man of the match in 2008 All-Ireland final, winning a third title with Tyrone.	
2009	Jason Smyth	Athletics	Became first legally blind athlete to qualify for able-bodied European Athletics Championships.	
2010	Graeme McDowell	Golf	Won the 2010 U.S. Open	
2011	Rory McIlroy	Golf	Won the 2011 U.S. Open	
2012	Rory McIlroy	Golf	Won the 2012 USPGA and 2012 Ryder Cup.	
2013	Martyn Irvine	Cycling	Won the scratch race at the 2013 UCI World Track Championships to become Ireland and Northern Ireland's first track World Champion.	
2014	Rory McIlroy	Golf	Won the 2014 Open and USPGA, won both PGA Tour and European Tour.	
2015	Michael Conlan	Boxing	Won both the World and European Amateur Boxing Championships at bantamweight.	
2017	Jonathan Rea	Motorcycle racing	3rd Superbike World Championship	
2018	Jacob Stockdale	Rugby union	Awarded Player of the 2018 Six Nations Championship, scoring a record seven tries as Ireland won Grand Slam.	
2019	Jonathan Rea	Motorcycle racing	5th Superbike World Championship	
2020	Jonathan Rea	Motorcycle racing	6th Superbike World Championship	
2021	Rachel Furness	Association football		
2022	Rhys McClenaghan	Artistic gymnastics	Became World Artistic Gymnastics champion on pommel horse. Ireland's first world champion in the sport.	
2023	Ciara Mageean	Athletics	Broke the ParkRun 5k world record, and placed 4th in the World Athletics Championships.	
2024	Daniel Wiffen	Swimming	Became Olympic and double World champion in the pool, and Northern Ireland's first individual Olympic gold medalist for almost 40 years.	
2025	Rory McIlroy	Golf	Won the 2025 Masters becoming the sixth player to win the career Grand Slam of all four men's golf majors.	

== See also ==
- Sport in Ireland
- BBC Sports Personality of the Year
