= Sergey Klimov =

Sergey Klimov may refer to:

- Sergey Klimov (cyclist) (born 1980), Soviet-born, Russian cyclist
- Sergey Klimov (canoeist) (born 1933), Soviet canoeist who competed in the late 1950s and early 1960s
