= UCI Track Cycling World Championships – Men's scratch =

The UCI Track Cycling World Championships – Men's scratch is the world championship scratch race held annually at the UCI Track Cycling World Championships. It was first held at the 2002 championships in Ballerup, near Copenhagen, Denmark. As of 2011, the event has had two two-time winners, Franco Marvulli of Switzerland in 2002 and 2003 and Alex Rasmussen of Denmark in 2004 and 2010.

== Medalists ==
Championships	Winner	Runner-up	Third
2002 Ballerup	Franco Marvulli (SUI)	Tony Gibb (GBR)	Stefan Steinweg (GER)
2003 Stuttgart	Franco Marvulli (SUI)	Robert Sassone (FRA)	Jean-Pierre Van Zyl (RSA)
2004 Melbourne	Greg Henderson (NZL)	Robert Slippens (NED)	Walter Pérez (ARG)
2005 Los Angeles	Alex Rasmussen (DEN)	Greg Henderson (NZL)	Matthew Gilmore (BEL)
2006 Bordeaux	Jérôme Neuville (FRA)	Ángel Colla (ARG)	Ioannis Tamouridis (GRE)
2007 Palma de Mallorca	Wong Kam-po (HKG)	Wim Stroetinga (NED)	Rafał Ratajczyk (POL)
2008 Manchester	Aliaksandr Lisouski (BLR)	Wim Stroetinga (NED)	Roger Kluge (GER)
2009 Pruszków	Morgan Kneisky (FRA)	Ángel Colla (ARG)	Andreas Müller (AUT)
2010 Ballerup	Alex Rasmussen (DEN)	Juan Esteban Arango (COL)	Kazuhiro Mori (JPN)
2011 Apeldoorn	Kwok Ho Ting (HKG)	Elia Viviani (ITA)	Morgan Kneisky (FRA)
2012 Melbourne	Ben Swift (GBR)	Nolan Hoffman (RSA)	Wim Stroetinga (NED)
2013 Minsk	Martyn Irvine (IRL)	Andreas Müller (AUT)	Luke Davison (AUS)
2014 Cali	Ivan Kovalev (RUS)	Martyn Irvine (IRL)	Cheung King Lok (HKG)
2015 Yvelines	Lucas Liss (GER)	Albert Torres (ESP)	Bobby Lea (USA)
2016 London	Sebastián Mora (ESP)	Ignacio Prado (MEX)	Claudio Imhof (SUI)
2017 Hong Kong	Adrian Tekliński (POL)	Lucas Liss (GER)	Christopher Latham (GBR)
2018 Apeldoorn	Yauheni Karaliok (BLR)	Michele Scartezzini (ITA)	Callum Scotson (AUS)
2019 Pruszków	Sam Welsford (AUS)	Roy Eefting (NED)	Thomas Sexton (NZL)
2020 Berlin	Yauheni Karaliok (BLR)	Simone Consonni (ITA)	Sebastián Mora (ESP)
2021 Roubaix	Donavan Grondin (FRA)	Tuur Dens (BEL)	Rhys Britton (GBR)
2022 Saint-Quentin-en-Yvelines	Dylan Bibic (CAN)	Kazushige Kuboki (JPN)	Roy Eefting (NED)
2023 Glasgow	William Tidball (GBR)	Kazushige Kuboki (JPN)	Tuur Dens (BEL)
2024 Ballerup	Kazushige Kuboki (JPN)	Tobias Hansen (DEN)	Clément Petit (FRA)
2025 Santiago	Moritz Augenstein (GER)	Yanne Dorenbos (NED)	Iúri Leitão (POR)
2026 Shanghai	Matthew Bostock (GBR)	Thomas Sexton (NZL)	Lindsay De Vylder (BEL)

== Medal table ==
Rank	Nation	Gold	Silver	Bronze	Total
1	France	3	1	2	6
1	Great Britain	3	1	2	6
3	Belarus	3	0	0	3
4	Germany	2	1	2	5
5	Denmark	2	1	0	3
6	Hong Kong	2	0	1	3
6	Switzerland	2	0	1	3
8	Japan	1	2	1	4
8	New Zealand	1	2	1	4
10	Spain	1	1	1	3
11	Ireland	1	1	0	2
12	Australia	1	0	2	3
13	Poland	1	0	1	2
14	Canada	1	0	0	1
14	Russia	1	0	0	1
16	Netherlands	0	5	2	7
17	Italy	0	3	0	3
18	Argentina	0	2	1	3
19	Belgium	0	1	3	4
20	Austria	0	1	1	2
20	South Africa	0	1	1	2
22	Colombia	0	1	0	1
22	Mexico	0	1	0	1
24	Greece	0	0	1	1
24	Portugal	0	0	1	1
24	United States	0	0	1	1
Totals (26 entries)		25	25	25	75
