= Alexander Morgan (cyclist) =

Australian cyclist

Personal information
- Born: 18 July 1994 (age 32)

Cycling career
- Sport: Cycling
- Disciplines: Track cycling Road cycling
- Role: Rider
- Rider type: endurance

Alexander Morgan (born 18 July 1994) is an Australian male road and track cyclist. At the 2013 UCI Track Cycling World Championships he won the gold medal in the team pursuit event. He also competed and finished 4th in the individual pursuit.
