= Alexander Serov (cyclist) =

Russian racing cyclist (born 1982)

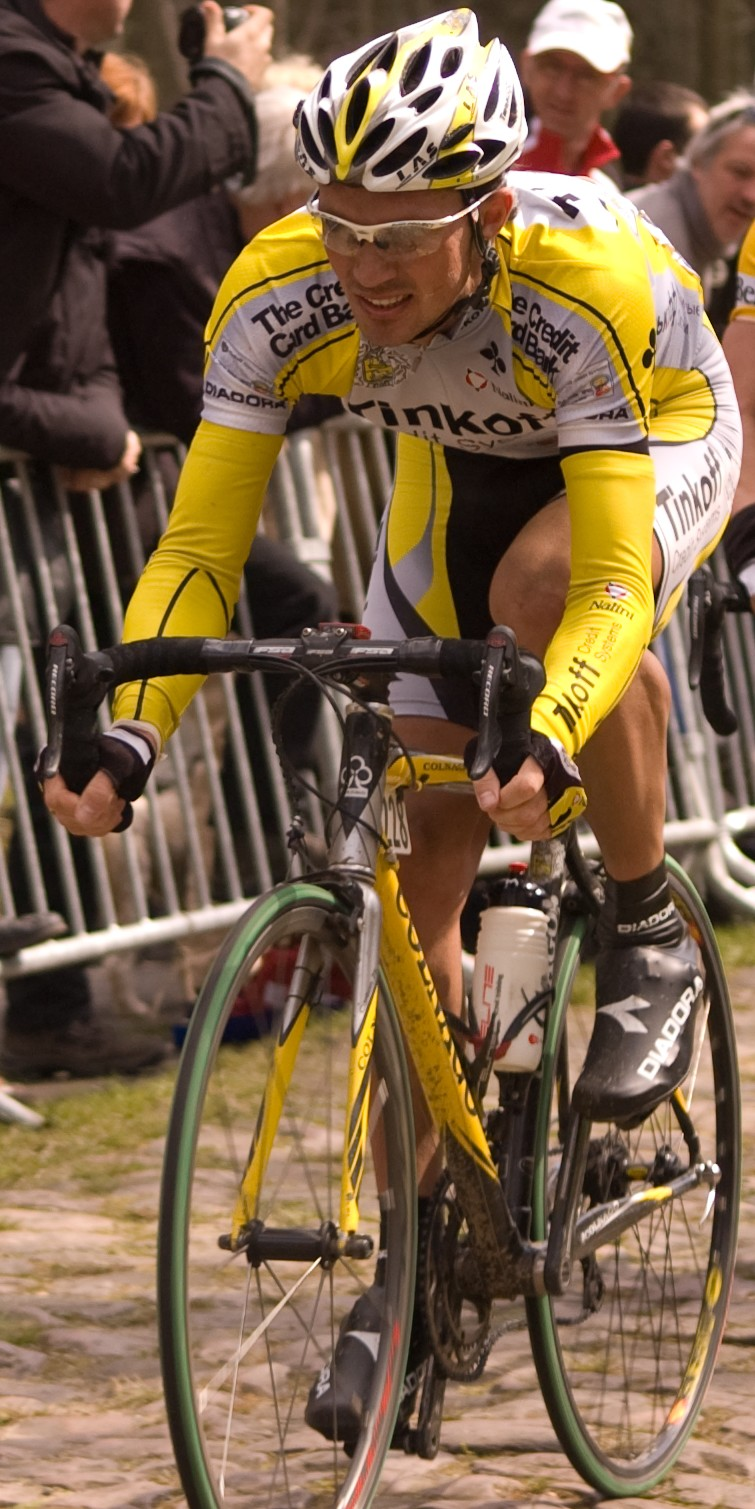

Personal information
- Full name: Alexander Sergeyevich Serov
- Born: 12 November 1982 (age 43): Vyborg, Soviet Union; (now Russia)

Cycling career
- Sport: Cycling
- Current team: Gazprom–RusVelo
- Disciplines: Road; Track
- Role: Rider (retired); Team manager
- Rider type: Sprinter; Time-Trialist

Professional teams
- 2001–2002: Itera
- 2003–2005: Lokomotiv
- 2006–2008: Tinkoff Restaurants
- 2009: Team Katusha
- 2012–2016: RusVelo

Managerial team
- 2017–: Gazprom–RusVelo (directeur sportif)
Medal record
Representing Russia
Men's track cycling
World Championships
Silver medal – second place	2011 Apeldoorn	Team pursuit
European Elite Championships
Gold medal – first place	2012 Panevėžys	Team Pursuit
Silver medal – second place	2010 Pruszków	Team Pursuit
Silver medal – second place	2013 Apeldoorn	Team Pursuit

Alexander Sergeyevich Serov (Russian: Алекса́ндр Серге́евич Серо́в; born 12 November 1982, in Vyborg) is a Russian former road and track racing cyclist, who rode professionally between 2001 and 2017 for the Itera, Lokomotiv, Tinkoff Credit Systems, Team Katusha and Gazprom–RusVelo teams.

== Career achievements ==
=== Major results ===
2002
2002 Track Cycling World Cup

1st, Team Pursuit, Moscow (with Alexei Markov, Sergei Klimov and Denis Smyslov)

2003
2003 Track Cycling World Cup

1st, Team Pursuit, Moscow (with Alexei Markov, Nikita Eskov and Sergei Klimov)

2005
2004–2005 Track Cycling World Cup

3rd, Team Pursuit, Moscow (with Serguei Klimov, Anton Mindlin and Nikolay Trusov)

2005–2006 Track Cycling World Cup

3rd, Individual Pursuit, Moscow
2nd, Team Pursuit, Moscow (with Serguei Klimov, Anton Mindlin and Nikolay Trusov)

2006
2005–2006 Track Cycling World Cup

1st, Team Pursuit, Los Angeles (with Sergei Klimov, Ivan Rovny and Nikolai Trussov)

2006–2007 Track Cycling World Cup

1st, Individual Pursuit, Sydney
1st, Team Pursuit, Sydney (with Mikhail Ignatiev, Ivan Rovny and Nikolai Trussov)
2nd, Team Pursuit, Moscow (with Ivan Kovalev, Nikolay Trusov and Ivan Rovny)
1st, Paris–Mantes-en-Yvelines

2007
2006–2007 Track Cycling World Cup

2nd, Individual Pursuit, Manchester

2nd, Eindhoven Team Time Trial (Tinkoff Credit Systems, with Sergei Klimov, Ivan Rovny, Mikhail Ignatiev, Yevgeni Petrov, Pavel Brutt, Vasil Kiryienka and Nikolay Trusov)
1st, Stage 5, Tour of Britain, Kendal
2007–2008 Track Cycling World Cup

3rd, Individual Pursuit, Sydney
3rd, Individual Pursuit, Beijing

2012
1st, Stage 2, Vuelta a Murcia
2013
1st, Stage 1, Volta a Portugal
1st, Stage 5, Vuelta Ciclista a Costa Rica
2nd European Track Championships – team pursuit (with Artur Ershov, Ivan Kovalev and Evgeny Kovalev)
2014
8th, Grand Prix of Moscow

=== Grand Tour general classification results timeline ===
Grand Tour	2008	2009	2010	2011	2012	2013	2014	2015	2016
Giro d'Italia	124	117	—	—	—	—	—	—	128
Tour de France	—	—	—	—	—	—	—	—	—
Vuelta a España	—	—	—	—	—	—	—	—	—

Legend
—	Did not compete
DNF	Did not finish
