= 2013 UCI Track Cycling World Championships – Men's scratch =

Rainbow jersey

The Men's scratch at the 2013 UCI Track Cycling World Championships was held on February 21. 23 athletes participated in the contest. The competition consisted of 60 laps, making a total of 15 km (9.3 mi).

== Medalists ==
Gold	Martyn Irvine (IRL)
Silver	Andreas Müller (AUT)
Bronze	Luke Davison (AUS)

== Results ==
The race was held at 20:35.

Rank	Name	Nation	Laps down
1st place, gold medalist(s)	Martyn Irvine	Ireland	
2nd place, silver medalist(s)	Andreas Müller	Austria	
3rd place, bronze medalist(s)	Luke Davison	Australia	
4	Tim Veldt	Netherlands	
5	Owain Doull	Great Britain	
6	Morgan Kneisky	France	
7	Theo Reinhardt	Germany	
8	Moreno de Pauw	Belgium	
9	Kwok Ho Ting	Hong Kong	
10	Albert Torres	Spain	
	Juan Esteban Arango	Colombia	DNF
	Artyom Zakharov	Kazakhstan	DNF
	Rajesh Chandrasekar	India	DNF
	Ángel Colla	Argentina	DNF
	Anton Muzychkin	Belarus	DNF
	Jiří Hochmann	Czech Republic	DNF
	Sotirios Bretas	Greece	DNF
	Davide Viganò	Italy	DNF
	Adrian Tekliński	Poland	DNF
	Nolan Hoffman	South Africa	DNF
	Leonid Krasnov	Russia	DNF
	Tristan Marguet	Switzerland	DNF
	Roman Lutsyshyn	Ukraine	DNF
