= Terence O'Reilly =

British medieval historian (1947–2023)

- Born: 1947
- Died: 2023 (aged 75–76)
- Occupation: Hispanist

Academic background
- Education: University of Nottingham

Academic work
- Discipline: Spanish Golden Age
- Institutions: University College Cork

Terence O'Reilly MRIA (1947–2023) was a professor of Spanish at University College Cork who undertook research on the literature, history and art of the Spanish Golden Age.

== Career ==
Terence O'Reilly received his B.A. Honours degree in Spanish and French in 1969 from the University of Nottingham, followed by a PhD for a thesis on the literature of meditation in early sixteenth century Castile and Aragon in 1972. In 1973, he was granted a research fellowship in the University of St Andrews, where he worked in the Spanish department. In 1975 he moved to University College Cork (UCC) to take up a college lectureship in Spanish.

According to his UCC research profile, his principal fields of research included the literature, history and art of Spain during the Golden Age (c. 1470–1700), the prose of the period, religious writings (Ignatius Loyola, Teresa of Avila, John of the Cross), and the paintings of El Greco and Diego Velázquez.‍

== Personal life ==
O'Reilly was born in London to Irish parents and lived for a period in India. In 1968, he married the historian Jennifer O'Reilly (née Williams). He died in 2023, having been diagnosed with motor neurone disease in 2017.

== Honours ==
- Lansdowne Lecturer, University of Victoria, British Columbia (2002)
- Government of Ireland Senior Research Fellow (2004–2005)
- Member of the Royal Irish Academy (2007)
- Veale Chair of Spirituality, Milltown Institute of Theology and Philosophy, Dublin (2009)

== Selected publications ==
- From Ignatius Loyola to John of the Cross: Spirituality and Literature in Sixteenth-Century Spain (Routledge: 1995)
- The Bible in the Literary Imagination of the Spanish Golden Age: Images and Texts from Columbus to Velázquez (Saint Joseph's University Press: 2010)
- The Spiritual Exercises of Saint Ignatius of Loyola: Contexts, Sources, Reception (Leiden & Boston: Brill, 2020)
- Humanism and Religion in Early Modern Spain: John of the Cross, Francisco de Aldana, Luis de León, ed. Stephen Boyd (Routledge: Variorum, 2022)
