= Eoin Mullen =

Irish cyclist (born 1993)

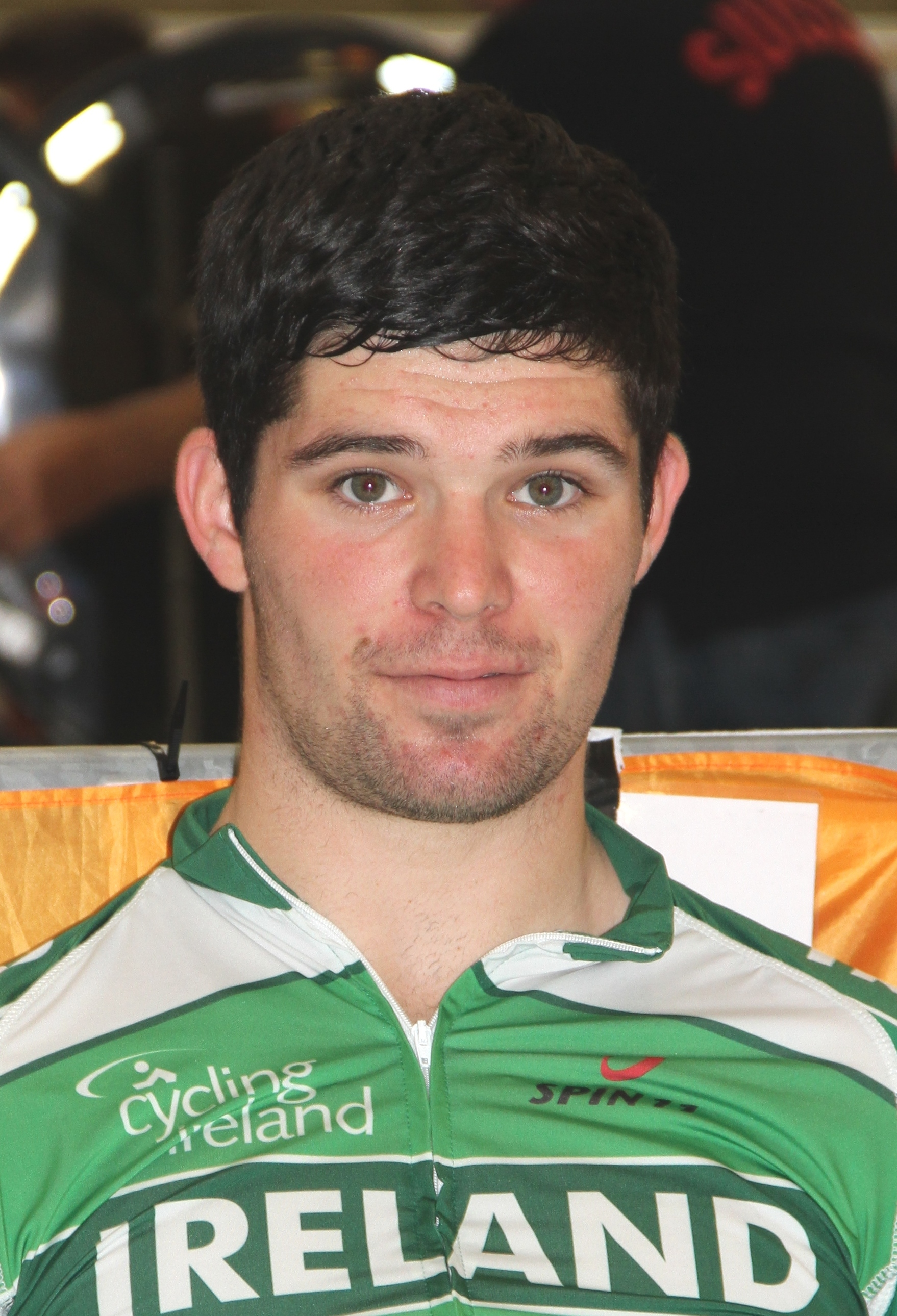
- Mullen at the 2015 UEC European Track Championships

Personal information
- Born: 6 August 1993 (age 33) Kilronan, Ireland

Cycling career
- Sport: Cycling
- Role: Rider

Eoin Mullen (born 6 August 1993) is an Irish professional racing cyclist. He competed in the sprint event at the 2013 UCI Track Cycling World Championships. As of 6 December 2013 he has the Irish national record in the flying 200 m time trial in a time of 9.834, which he rode at the second meeting of the 2013–14 UCI Track Cycling World Cup in Aguascalientes, Mexico. He rode at the 2015 UCI Track Cycling World Championships.

His brother, Paul Mullen, plays international rugby union for the United States national team.
