= Orla Walsh =

Irish cyclist

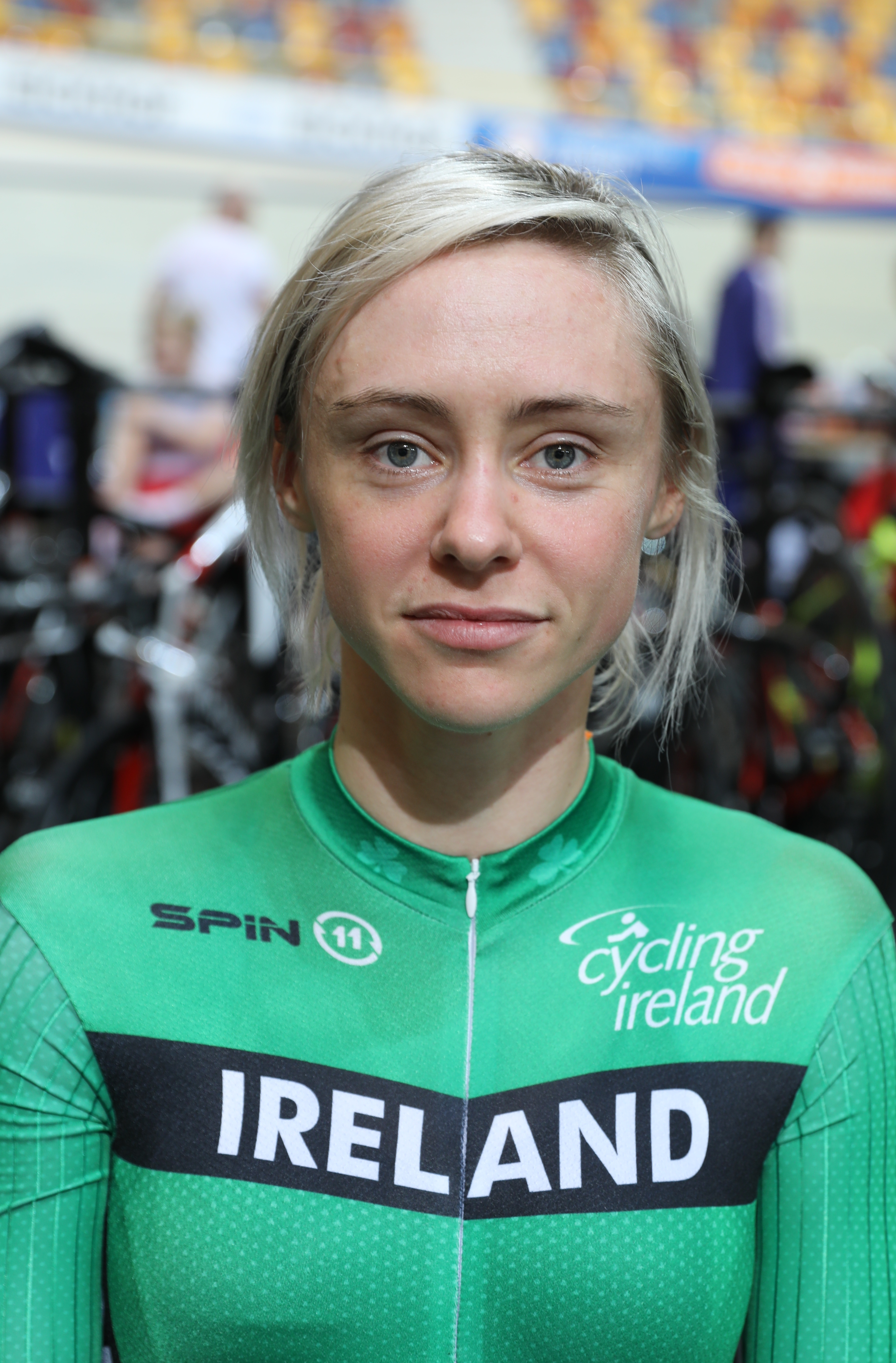
- Orla Walsh (2019)

Personal information
- Born: 9 May 1989 (age 37)

Cycling career
- Sport: Cycling
- Discipline: Track cycling

Amateur team
- 2015 -: Orwell Wheelers

Professional team
- Nopinz Symec

Orla Walsh is an Irish track cyclist. She competed individually in the women's scratch, as well as part of the Irish team, at the 2019 European Games in the team pursuit. As of August 2020, she holds the Irish record for the 500m time trial at 36.220. She started cycling in her twenties, her transition into elite sportswoman was the subject of a 2021 Global Cycling Network documentary Cycling Changed My Life: Orla Walsh.
