= Martyn Irvine =

Northern Ireland-born former cyclist (born 1985)

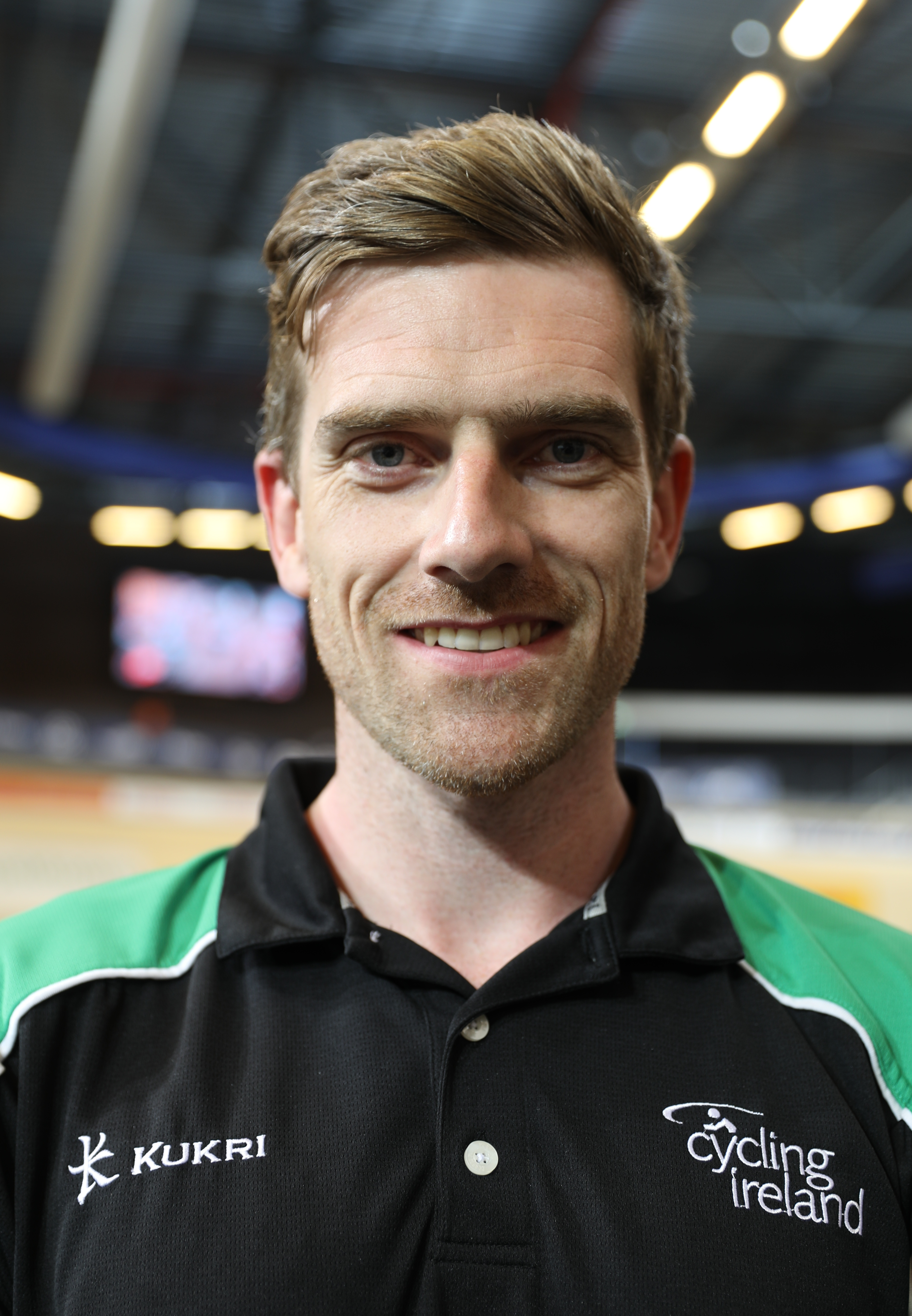
- Irvine at the 2019 UEC European Track Championships

Personal information
- Full name: Martyn Irvine
- Born: 6 June 1985 (age 41) Newtownards, County Down, Northern Ireland
- Height: 1.79 m (5 ft 10 in)

Cycling career
- Sport: Cycling
- Current team: Retired
- Disciplines: Road; Track
- Role: Rider (retired); Directeur sportif
- Rider type: All-rounder

Professional teams
- 2006: Sean Kelly ACLVB–M.Donnelly (stagiaire)
- 2008: Pezula Racing
- 2010: Planet X
- 2011–2012: Giant Kenda Cycling Team
- 2013–2014: UnitedHealthcare
- 2015: Madison Genesis
- 2017: Aqua Blue Sport

Managerial team
- 2018: Aqua Blue Sport

Major wins
- Track Scratch, World Championships (2013)
Medal record
Representing Ireland
Men's track cycling
World Championships
Gold medal – first place	2013 Minsk	Scratch
Silver medal – second place	2013 Minsk	Individual pursuit
Silver medal – second place	2014 Cali	Scratch
European Championships
Bronze medal – third place	2013 Apeldoorn	Omnium
Representing Northern Ireland
Commonwealth Games
Bronze medal – third place	2010 Delhi	Team pursuit

Martyn Irvine (born 6 June 1985) is a Northern Ireland-born former cyclist, who competed professionally between 2008 and 2017 for the Pezula Racing, Planet X, RTS Racing Team, UnitedHealthcare, Madison Genesis and Aqua Blue Sport teams, and rode at the 2012 Olympic Games. He was also a directeur sportif for the Aqua Blue Sport team.

Irvine is a 7-time Irish national track and road cycling champion cyclist, who represented the Irish National track team in the Omnium event at the World Cup Classics, and was world champion in the scratch race in 2013. He was UCI World Ranked 17th at the end of the inaugural 2010/11 Omnium season, with 315 ranking points.

== Career ==
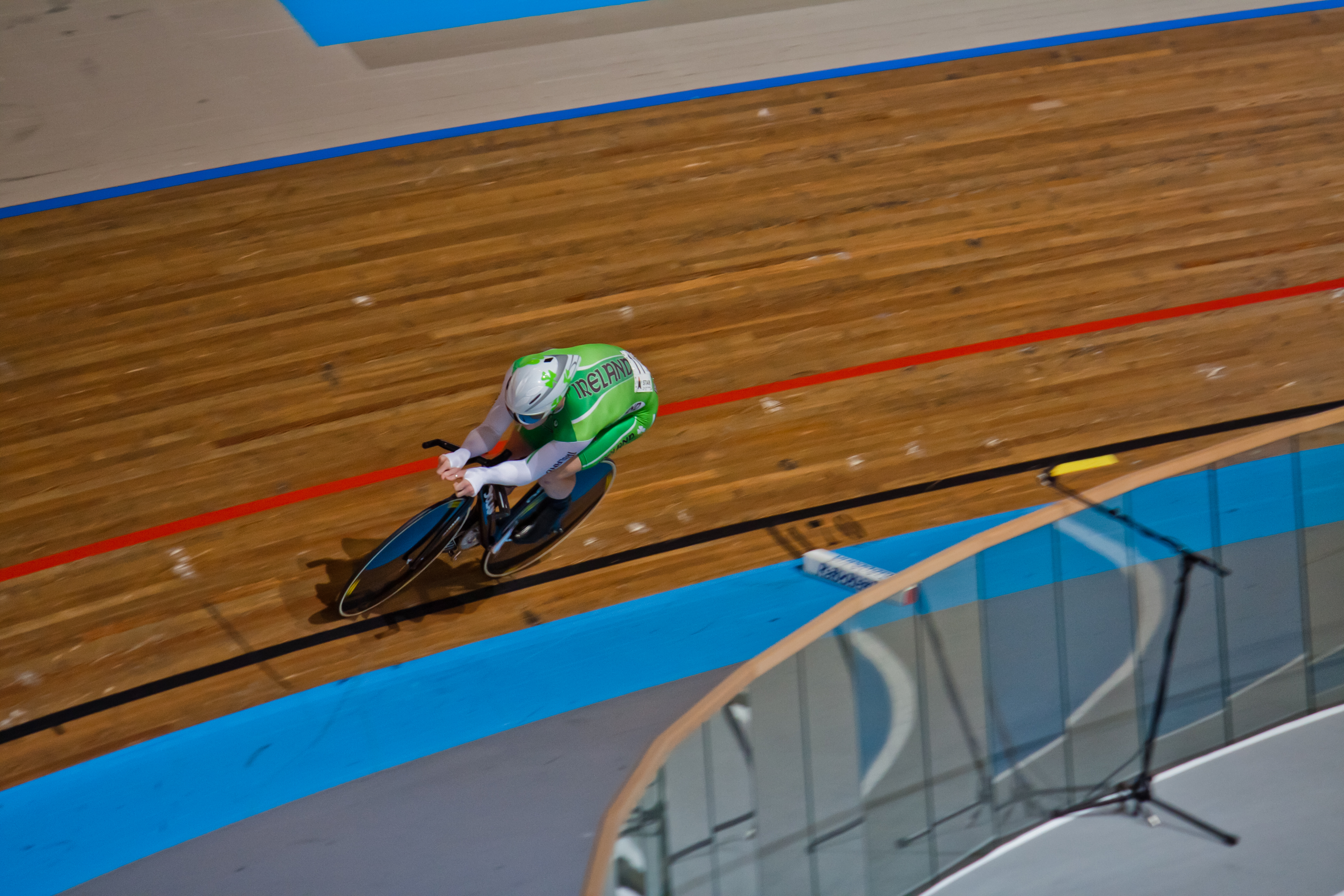
Irvine representing Ireland at the 2011 European Track Cycling Championships.

He signed with the UCI Asia based Giant Kenda Cycling Team for the 2011 season.

After the 2012 London World Cup event, he had 470 ranking points. He qualified for the Omnium event at the London Olympics where he finished 13th.

=== UnitedHealthcare (2013–2014) ===
In November 2012, Irvine signed a contract to ride with the UnitedHealthcare team for the 2013 season.

In February 2013 he won gold at the 2013 UCI Track Cycling World Championships in the Scratch Race, only an hour after winning a silver medal in the Individual Pursuit. Prior to Irvine, no Irish male rider had won a World Championship medal in 116 years. As a result, he was named as BBC Northern Ireland Sports Personality of the Year for 2013.

In February 2014, Irvine won a silver medal in the scratch race at the 2014 UCI Track Cycling World Championships.

=== Madison Genesis (2015) ===
In November 2014 Madison Genesis announced that Irvine would join them for the 2015 season.

=== Retirement ===
After failing to qualify for the 2016 Summer Olympics in Rio de Janeiro, in January 2016 Irvine announced his retirement from competition.

=== Return with Aqua Blue Sport (2017) ===
In October 2016, he announced his comeback to professional cycling, signing with newly created Irish UCI Professional Continental team Aqua Blue Sport for the 2017 season. He retired for the second time at the end of the season, joining the team's backroom staff.

== Major results ==
=== Road ===
2005
3rd Time trial, National Under-23 Championships
2007
National Under-23 Championships

2nd Road race
3rd Time trial

2009
1st Overall Tour of the North
National Championships

2nd Time trial
4th Road race

3rd National Criterium Championships
5th East Midlands International CiCLE Classic
2010
1st National Criterium Championships
2nd Time trial, National Championships
2011
1st National Criterium Championships
1st Stage 7 An Post Rás
5th Time trial, National Championships
8th Lincoln Grand Prix
9th Overall Tour of Ulster

1st Mountains classification

2012
National Championships

2nd Time trial
4th Road race

2013
2nd National Criterium Championships
2014
3rd Time trial, National Championships
2015
3rd Time trial, National Championships
7th Overall An Post Rás

=== Track ===
2010
National Championships

1st Kilo
1st Individual pursuit

3rd Team pursuit, Commonwealth Games
2011
National Championships

1st Kilo
1st Individual pursuit
1st Scratch

2012
UCI World Cup, Glasgow

2nd Scratch
2nd Individual pursuit

2013
UCI Track World Championships

1st Scratch
2nd Individual pursuit

1st Individual pursuit, National Championships
1st Points race, UCI World Cup, Manchester
3rd Omnium, UEC European Championships
2014
2nd Scratch, UCI World Championships

==== Major championship results ====
Event		2010	2011	2012	2013	2014	2015
Olympic Games	Omnium	Not Held		13	Not Held		
World Championships	Individual pursuit	—	—	—	2	12	—
World Championships	Omnium	—	10	7	—	—	17
World Championships	Points race	—	—	—	—	6	—
World Championships	Scratch race	—	—	—	1	2	10
World Championships	Team pursuit	13	—	—	—	—	—
European Championships	Individual pursuit	—	—	—	—	—	10
European Championships	Omnium	9	5	—	3	10	—
European Championships	Points race	—	—	—	DNF	—	—
European Championships	Scratch race	—	—	—	—	28	11
European Championships	Team pursuit	—	—	—	—	DNF	14
Commonwealth Games	Individual pursuit	6	Not Held			—	NH
Commonwealth Games	Points race	7	Not Held			DNF	NH
Commonwealth Games	Scratch race	DNF	Not Held			14	NH
Commonwealth Games	Team pursuit	3	Not Held			—	NH
UCI Track Cycling World Cup	Individual pursuit	—	—	—	2	—	—
UCI Track Cycling World Cup	Omnium	—	23	7	—	—	—
UCI Track Cycling World Cup	Scratch race	—	—	—	2	—	—
UCI Track Cycling World Ranking	Individual pursuit	—	—	—	2	14	79
UCI Track Cycling World Ranking	Omnium	—	17	7	74	34	41
UCI Track Cycling World Ranking	Scratch race	—	—	—	1	—	16
