= Ignat Malei =

Belarusian cyclist

Personal information
- Born: 25 February 1992 (age 34)

Cycling career
- Sport: Cycling
- Discipline: Track cycling
- Role: Rider
- Rider type: individual pursuit

Ignat Malei (born 25 February 1992) is a Belarusian male track cyclist. He competed in the individual pursuit event at the 2013 UCI Track Cycling World Championships.
