= Luke Davison =

Australian cyclist (born 1990)

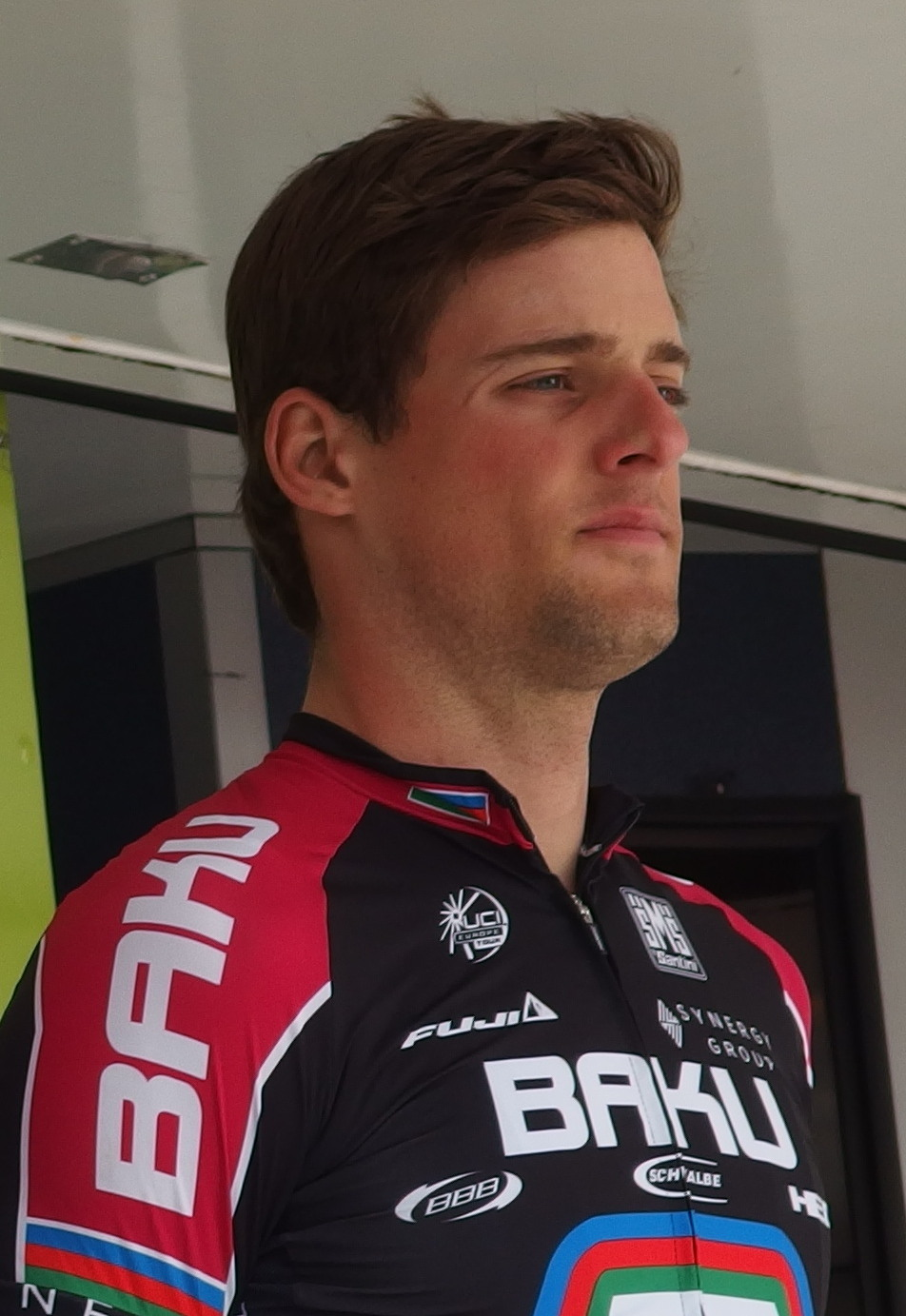

Personal information
- Nickname: Davo
- Born: 8 May 1990 (age 36) Paddington, New South Wales
- Height: 183 cm (6 ft 0 in)
- Weight: 77 kg (170 lb)

Cycling career
- Sport: Cycling
- Current team: Retired
- Disciplines: Track, Road

Amateur team
- 2009: Team AIS

Professional teams
- 2011–2012: Team Budget Forklifts
- 2013: Drapac Cycling
- 2014: BMC Racing Team (stagiaire)
- 2014: Synergy Baku Cycling Project
- 2015: Team Budget Forklifts
Medal record
Representing Australia
Men's track cycling
World Championships
Gold medal – first place	2014 Cali	Team pursuit
Gold medal – first place	2016 London	Team pursuit
Bronze medal – third place	2013 Minsk	Scratch
Bronze medal – third place	2015 Saint-Quentin-en-Yvelines	Team pursuit
Commonwealth Games
Gold medal – first place	2014 Glasgow	team pursuit

Luke Davison (born 8 May 1990) is an Australian former professional road and track cyclist.. In 2012 he won the Goulburn to Sydney Classic. In 2014, he represented Australia at the Track World Championships and the Commonwealth Games and won gold in the team pursuit event at both meetings. On the road he won the Omloop der Kempen. In November 2014 it was announced that he would rejoin Team Budget Forklifts for 2015 alongside fellow members of the Australian endurance track squad Jack Bobridge, Glenn O'Shea, Scott Sunderland and Mitchel Mulhearn, riding a domestic programme with a focus on achieving success on the track at the 2016 Summer Olympics.

== Major results ==
=== Road ===
2011
5th Road race, Oceania Under-23 Road Championships
2012
1st Overall National Road Series
1st Overall Tour of the Murray River

1st Stages 1, 6, 8 & 12

1st Stages 1, 2,4 & 9 Tour of Gippsland
1st Stages 2 & 8 Tour of the Great South Coast
1st Stage 2 Goulburn to Sydney Classic
6th Time trial, Oceania Road Championships
2013
1st Stage 2 Herald Sun Tour
1st Stage 3 Tour of the Murray River
2014
1st Omloop der Kempen
