= Maryia Lohvinava =

Belarusian cyclist

Personal information
- Born: 25 September 1992 (age 34)

Cycling career
- Sport: Cycling
- Discipline: Track cycling
- Role: Rider
- Rider type: sprinter

Maryia Lohvinava (born 25 September 1992) is a Belarusian female track cyclist. She competed in three events at the 2012 UCI Track Cycling World Championships.
