= Alberto Covarrubias =

Mexican cyclist

Personal information
- Full name: Alberto Iván Covarrubias Rocha
- Born: 23 January 1994 (age 32) Monterrey, Nuevo León

Cycling career
- Sport: Cycling
- Discipline: Track cycling
- Role: Rider
- Rider type: scratch

Alberto Iván Covarrubias Rocha (born 23 January 1994) is a Mexican male track cyclist. He competed in the scratch event at the 2014 UCI Track Cycling World Championships.
