= Jennifer O'Reilly =

British medieval historian

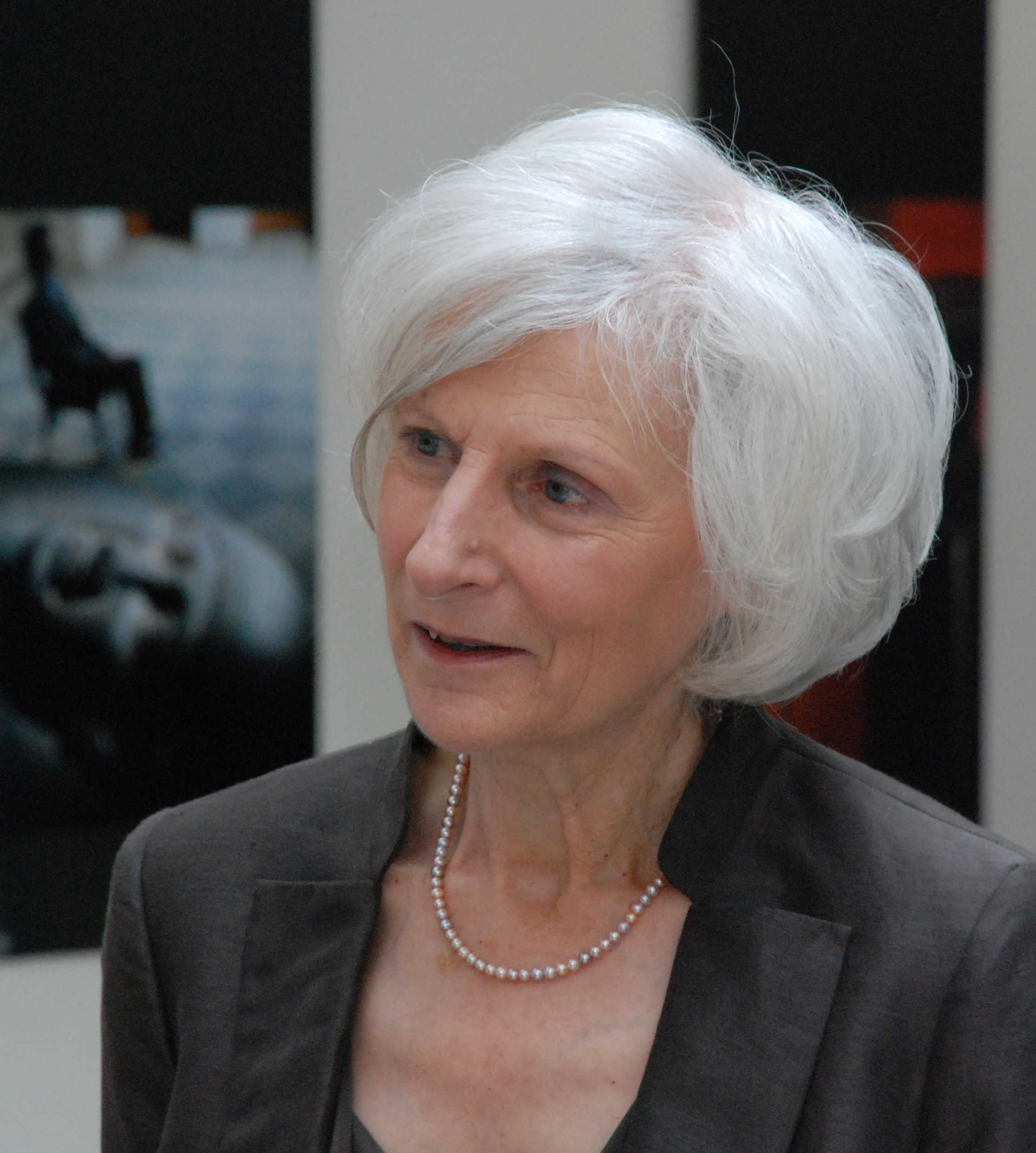
- Born: 1943
- Died: 2016 (aged 72–73)
- Occupations: Medievalist, Art Historian

Academic background
- Education: University of Nottingham

Academic work
- Discipline: Medieval History; Art History
- Institutions: University College Cork

Jennifer O'Reilly FRSA MRIA (1943–2016) was a medieval historian of Britain and Ireland known for her work on text and image, the writings of Bede, and medieval iconography. She was married to the Irish scholar Terence O'Reilly.

== Career ==
Jennifer O’Reilly received her B.A. Honours degree in history in 1964 from the University of Nottingham, followed by a Dip.Ed. (Distinction) from the Department of Education at the University of Oxford in 1965. She returned to Nottingham for her Ph.D in Art History, which was awarded in 1972. Subsequently, she taught at the University of St Andrews (1974–75), before moving to University College Cork (UCC), where she worked until her retirement in 2008. She also had a prominent role in setting up the degree programme in History of Art at UCC.

Her monograph, Studies in the Iconography of the Virtues and Vices in the Middle Ages was published in 1988. A book of essays in her honour was published in 2011, 'Listen, o isles, unto me: studies in medieval word and image in honour of Jennifer O'Reilly'. In retirement she continued to publish extensively and gave the Jarrow Lecture and the Brixworth Lecture in 2014.

Three volumes of her collected essays were published by Routledge in 2019, edited by Diarmuid Scully, Máirín MacCarron, Carol Farr and Elizabeth Mullins, including both previous publications and formerly unpublished work. The first volume includes her work on Bede, Adomnán and Thomas Becket, and the second and third cover the Insular Gospel Books, the Codex Amiatinus, the Book of Kells and Anglo-Saxon Art.

== Honours ==
- Fellow of the Royal Society of Antiquaries (2005)
- Member of the Royal Irish Academy (2007)
- The Jarrow Lecture (2014)
- The Brixworth Lecture (2014)
- Festschrift (2011) Listen, O Isles, Unto Me: studies in medieval word and image in Honour of Jennifer O'Reilly, edited by Elizabeth Mullins and Diarmuid Scully (Cork University Press)

== Selected publications ==
- History, Hagiography and Biblical Exegesis: Essays on Bede, Adomnán and Thomas Becket, eds. Diarmuid Scully and Máirín MacCarron (Routledge, 2019)
- Early Medieval Text and Image: The Insular Gospel Books, eds. Carol Farr and Elizabeth Mullins (Routledge, 2019)
- Early Medieval Text and Image: The Codex Amiatinus, the Book of Kells and Anglo-Saxon Art, eds. Carol Farr and Elizabeth Mullins (Routledge 2019)
- ‘St Paul and the sign of Jonah. Theology and Scripture in Bede’s Historia Ecclesiastica’, (Jarrow Lecture, 2014)
- Studies in the iconography of the Virtues and Vices in the Middle Ages (New York and London, 1988)

== The Jennifer O'Reilly Memorial Lecture series ==
An annual memorial lecture in honour of Jennifer O’Reilly was established in 2017 by the School of History at University College Cork.

- Dr Alan Thacker (Institute of Historical Research, School of Advanced Study), 'Bede and Cassiodorus', 2017
- Professor Jane Hawkes (University of York), ‘Venerating the Cross around the year 800 in Anglo-Saxon England’, 2018
- Professor Máire Herbert (University College Cork), ‘At the Ends of the Earth: Conversion and its consequences in some Insular Sources’, 2019
