= Nikolay Trusov =

Russian road bicycle racer

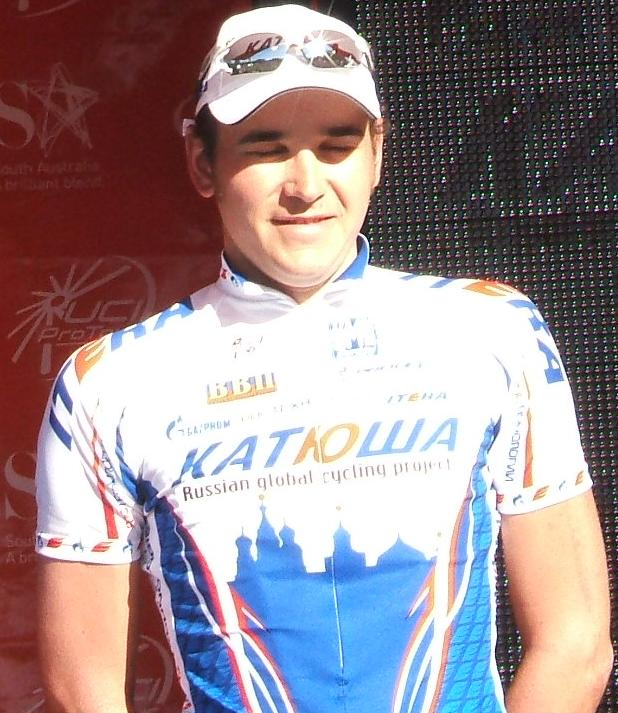

Personal information
- Full name: Nikolay Vasilievich Trusov
- Born: 2 July 1985 (age 41): Leningrad, Soviet Union; (now Saint Petersburg, Russia)
- Height: 1.86 m (6 ft 1 in)
- Weight: 77 kg (170 lb)

Cycling career
- Sport: Cycling
- Disciplines: Road; Track
- Role: Rider

Amateur team
- 2019: Krasnodar

Professional teams
- 2004–2005: Lokomotiv
- 2006–2008: Tinkoff Restaurants
- 2009–2011: Team Katusha
- 2012: RusVelo
- 2013: Cycling Team De Rijke–Shanks
- 2014–2016: Tinkoff–Saxo
- 2017–2018: Gazprom–RusVelo
- 2019: China Continental Team of Gansu Bank

Nikolay Vasilievich Trusov (Russian: Николай Васильевич Трусов; born 2 July 1985, in Leningrad) is a Russian professional racing cyclist, who last rode for UCI Continental team China Continental Team of Gansu Bank. Trusov has been a professional cyclist since 2004.

== Major results ==
2005
2004–2005 Track Cycling World Cup

3rd Team Pursuit, Moscow (with Serguei Klimov, Anton Mindlin and Alexander Serov)
3rd Madison, Los Angeles (with Mikhail Ignatiev)

1st Clásica Memorial Txuma
2005–2006 Track Cycling World Cup

2nd Team Pursuit, Moscow (with Serguei Klimov, Anton Mindlin and Alexander Serov)
1st Madison, Moscow (with Mikhail Ignatiev)
2nd Madison, Manchester (with Mikhail Ignatiev)

2006
2005–2006 Track Cycling World Cup

1st Team Pursuit, Los Angeles (with Sergei Klimov, Ivan Rovny and Alexander Serov)
3rd Madison, Los Angeles (with Mikhail Ignatiev)

1st Stage 1 Cinturón a Mallorca
Five Rings of Moscow

1st Prologue, Stages 1, 2, 3 & 5

1st Stage 5 Volta a Lleida
2006–2007 Track Cycling World Cup

1st Team Pursuit, Sydney (with Mikhail Ignatiev, Ivan Rovny and Alexander Serov)
1st Madison, Sydney (with Mikhail Ignatiev)
2nd Team Pursuit, Moscow (with Ivan Kovalev, Alexander Serov and Ivan Rovny)

2007
2006–2007 Track Cycling World Cup

2nd Team Pursuit, Manchester (with Alexei Bauer, Evgeny Kovalev and Ivan Kovalev)
3rd Madison, Manchester (with Serguei Klimov)

2nd Eindhoven Team Time Trial (Tinkoff Credit Systems, with Sergei Klimov, Ivan Rovny, Mikhail Ignatiev, Yevgeni Petrov, Pavel Brutt and Vasil Kiryienka)
1st Stage 2 Tour of Britain
2009
1st Stage 5 Volta a Catalunya
1st Duo Normand (with Artem Ovechkin)
2012
6th Overall Ster ZLM Toer
2013
8th Overall Volta ao Alentejo
9th Riga–Jūrmala GP
2015
2nd Kampioenschap van Vlaanderen
2016
1st Stage 5 (TTT) Tour of Croatia
9th Overall Tour des Fjords
2018
1st Sprints classification Abu Dhabi Tour
