= Ivan Kovalev (cyclist) =

Russian cyclist

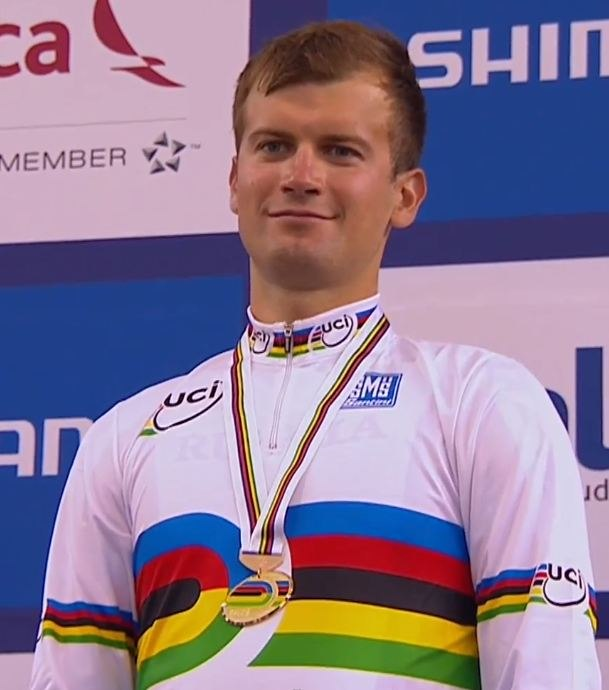

Personal information
- Full name: Ivan Alexandrovich Kovalev
- Born: 26 July 1986 (age 40) Yekaterinburg, Russian SFSR, Soviet Union
- Height: 184 cm (6 ft 0 in)
- Weight: 78 kg (172 lb)

Cycling career
- Sport: Cycling
- Current team: Russian Helicopters
- Disciplines: Road, track
- Role: Rider

Professional teams
- 2006: Omnibike Dynamo Moscow
- 2007: Amore & Vita–McDonald's
- 2008: Katyusha
- 2009–2010: Moscow
- 2012–2013: RusVelo
- 2014: Russian Helicopters

Major wins
- Track Scratch, World Championships (2014)
Medal record
Representing Russia
Men's track cycling
World Championships
Gold medal – first place	2014 Cali	Scratch
Silver medal – second place	2011 Apeldoorn	Team pursuit
European Elite Championships
Silver medal – second place	2010 Pruszków	Team Pursuit
Silver medal – second place	2013 Apeldoorn	Team Pursuit
Bronze medal – third place	2011 Apeldoorn	Team Pursuit

Ivan Alexandrovich Kovalev (Russian: Иван Александрович Ковалёв; born 26 July 1986) is a Russian professional racing cyclist, with the Russian Helicopters team. His brother Evgeny Kovalev is also a racing cyclist.

== Major results ==
2005
UCI Track World Cup Classics

1st Scratch, Moscow
3rd Individual pursuit, Sydney

2006
UCI Track World Cup Classics

1st Scratch, Moscow
2nd Scratch, Los Angeles
2nd Team pursuit, Moscow

2007
2nd Team pursuit, UCI Track World Cup Classics, Manchester
2009
1st Stage 4 Five Rings of Moscow
1st Stage 2 Vuelta a Costa Rica
2010
1st Prologue Five Rings of Moscow
2011
2nd Overall Tour of China
2nd Team pursuit, UCI Track World Championships
2013
1st Grand Prix of Moscow
2nd Team pursuit, UEC European Track Championships
2014
1st Scratch, UCI Track World Championships
