= Di Mu =

Chinese cyclist

Personal information
- Born: 12 June 1985 (age 41)

Cycling career
- Sport: Cycling
- Discipline: Track cycling
- Role: Rider
- Rider type: keirin

Di Mu (born 12 June 1985) is a Chinese female track cyclist. She competed in the keirin event at the 2012 UCI Track Cycling World Championships.
