= Nikita Eskov =

Russian professional racing cyclist

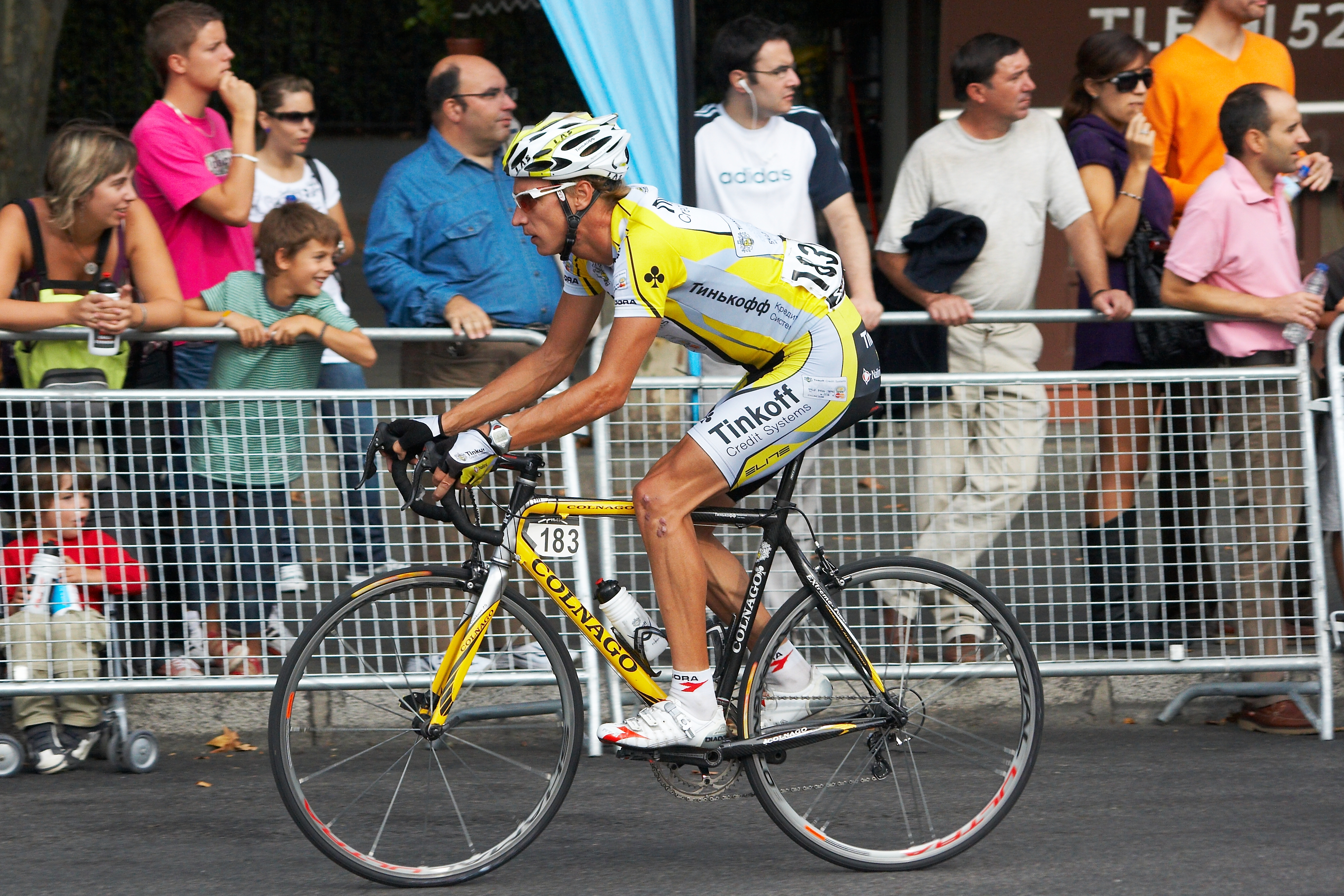

Personal information
- Full name: Nikita Eskov; Никита Еськов
- Born: 23 January 1983 (age 43) Saint Petersburg, Russia

Cycling career
- Sport: Cycling
- Current team: RusVelo
- Discipline: Road
- Role: Rider

Amateur teams
- 2002: Itera (stagiaire)
- 2007: Valdarno Cycling Team

Professional teams
- 2003–2005: Lokomotiv
- 2008: Tinkoff Credit Systems
- 2009–2010: Team Katusha
- 2012–: RusVelo

Nikita Eskov (Russian: Никита Еськов; born 23 January 1983 in Saint Petersburg) is a Russian professional racing cyclist, currently riding for UCI Professional Continental Team RusVelo.

== Palmarès ==
2000
3rd, Track Cycling World Championships Juniors team pursuit
2001
1st, Track Cycling World Championships, Juniors points race
2002
1st, Stage 2, Bidasoa Itzulia
1st, Stage 2, Volta Ciclista Provincia Tarragona
2003
1st, European Track Championships, U23 Points race
Track Cycling World Cup

1st, Team pursuit, Moscow (with Alexei Markov, Alexander Serov and Sergei Klimov)

2005
Track Cycling World Cup

2nd, Points race, Manchester
