= Roman Lutsyshyn =

Ukrainian track cyclist

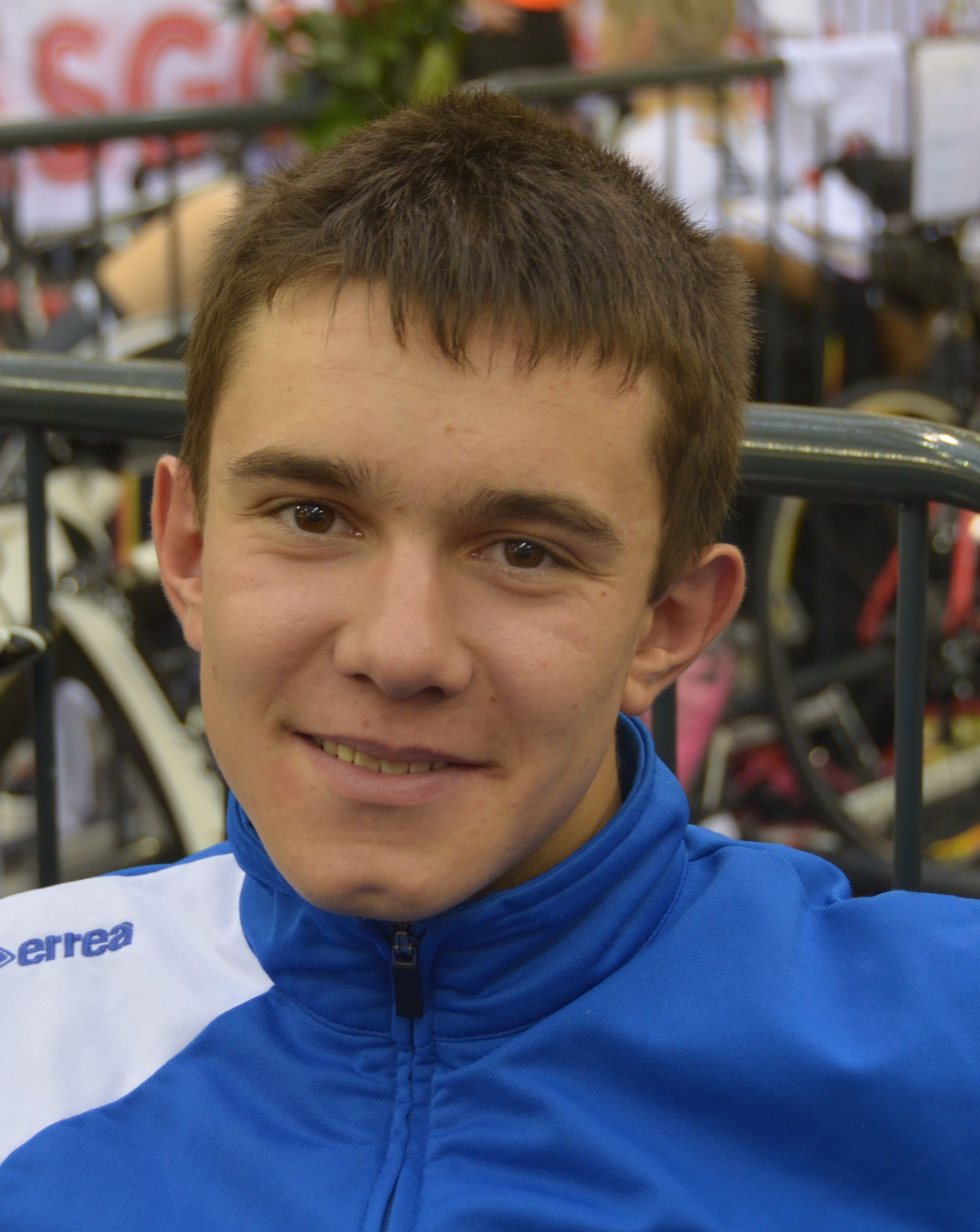

Personal information
- Born: 13 November 1994 (age 31)

Cycling career
- Sport: Cycling
- Discipline: Track cycling
- Role: Rider
- Rider type: scratch points race

Roman Lutsyshyn (born 13 November 1994) is a Ukrainian male track cyclist. He competed at the 2013 UCI Track Cycling World Championships. In 2014 he rode in the scratch event and points race event at the 2014 UCI Track Cycling World Championships.
