= Sergey Klimov (cyclist) =

Russian cyclist

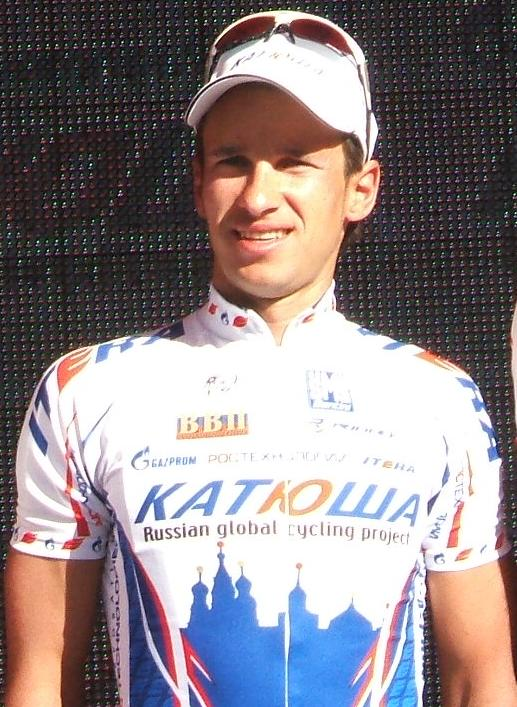

Personal information
- Full name: Sergey Alexandrovich Klimov; Russian: Серге́й Александрович Климов
- Born: 7 July 1980 (age 46): Leningrad, Russian SFSR, Soviet Union; (now Saint Petersburg, Russia)

Cycling career
- Sport: Cycling
- Current team: Roland Le Dévoluy
- Discipline: Road
- Role: Rider (retired); Directeur sportif
- Rider type: All-rounder

Professional teams
- 2001–2002: Itera
- 2003–2005: Lokomotiv
- 2006–2008: Tinkoff Restaurants
- 2009–2010: Team Katusha
- 2012–2014: RusVelo

Managerial teams
- 2016–2017: Gazprom–RusVelo
- 2018–: Cogeas

Sergey Alexandrovich Klimov (Russian: Серге́й Александрович Климов; born 7 July 1980 in Saint Petersburg) is a Russian former professional racing cyclist, who rode professionally between 2001 and 2014 for the Itera, Lokomotiv, Tinkoff Credit Systems, Team Katusha and RusVelo teams. He now works as a directeur sportif for UCI Women's Continental Team Roland Le Dévoluy.

== Major results ==
=== Road ===
2001
1st Stage 3 Tour de Normandie
2003
1st Stage 5b Volta Tarragona
4th Overall Ster Elektrotoer
2007
2nd Eindhoven Team Time Trial
7th Tre Valli Varesine
2008
7th Overall Settimana Ciclistica Lombarda

1st Stage 1 (TTT)

2010
1st Stage 3 (TTT) Vuelta a Burgos
2012
7th Giro di Toscana
2013
3rd Overall Five Rings of Moscow

1st Stage 3

7th Giro di Toscana
2014
2nd Overall Grand Prix Udmurtskaya Pravda
4th Memorial Oleg Dyachenko
8th Overall Five Rings of Moscow

==== Grand Tour general classification results timeline ====
Grand Tour	2008	2009	2010	2011	2012	2013
Giro d'Italia	110	137	94	—	—	—
Tour de France	—	—	—	—	—	—
Vuelta a España	—	—	—	—	—	—

Legend
—	Did not compete
DNF	Did not finish

=== Track ===
2002
1st Team pursuit, UCI World Cup Classics, Moscow (with Alexei Markov, Alexander Serov and Denis Smyslov)
2003
1st Team pursuit, UCI World Cup Classics, Moscow (with Alexei Markov, Alexander Serov and Nikita Eskov)
2004–2005
3rd Team pursuit, UCI World Cup Classics, Moscow (with Nikolay Trusov, Anton Mindlin and Alexander Serov)
2005–2006
UCI World Cup Classics

1st, Team pursuit, Los Angeles (with Nikolay Trusov, Ivan Rovny and Alexander Serov)
2nd, Team pursuit, Moscow (with Nikolay Trusov, Anton Mindlin and Alexander Serov)

2006–2007
UCI World Cup Classics

1st, Points race, Manchester
3rd, Manchester Manchester, Madison (with Nikolay Trusov)
