= 2011 UCI Track Cycling World Championships – Men's omnium =

Rainbow jersey

The Men's omnium at the 2011 UCI Track Cycling World Championships was held on March 25 and 26. 22 athletes participated in the contest. There were six events held.

== Results ==
=== Flying Lap ===
The Flying lap was held at 14:55.

Rank	Name	Nation	Time
1	Zachary Bell	Canada	13.320
2	Bryan Coquard	France	13.362
3	Alois Kaňkovský	Czech Republic	13.378
4	Shane Archbold	New Zealand	13.457
5	Tim Veldt	Netherlands	13.517
6	Sam Harrison	United Kingdom	13.612
7	Martyn Irvine	Ireland	13.628
8	Gijs van Hoecke	Belgium	13.677
9	Elia Viviani	Italy	13.724
10	Lasse Norman Hansen	Denmark	13.740
11	Bobby Lea	United States	13.742
12	Michael Freiberg	Australia	13.761
13	Erik Mohs	Germany	13.799
14	Alexei Markov	Russia	13.839
15	Eloy Teruel Rovira	Spain	13.877
16	Rafał Ratajczyk	Poland	13.904
17	Juan Esteban Arango	Colombia	13.943
18	Ioannis Tamouridis	Greece	13.999
19	Luis Mansilla	Chile	14.106
20	Kazuhiro Mori	Japan	14.173
21	Kwok Ho Ting	Hong Kong	14.263
22	Vladimir Tuychiev	Uzbekistan	14.929

=== Points Race ===
The Points Race was held at 16:00.

Rank	Name	Nation	Laps	Points
1	Juan Esteban Arango	Colombia	1	36
2	Luis Mansilla	Chile	1	35
3	Eloy Teruel Rovira	Spain	1	34
4	Lasse Norman Hansen	Denmark	1	33
5	Michael Freiberg	Australia	1	32
6	Alexei Markov	Russia	1	31
7	Gijs van Hoecke	Belgium	1	23
8	Ioannis Tamouridis	Greece	0	14
9	Kwok Ho Ting	Hong Kong	0	10
10	Elia Viviani	Italy	0	9
11	Martyn Irvine	Ireland	0	6
12	Zachary Bell	Canada	0	2
13	Kazuhiro Mori	Japan	0	2
14	Erik Mohs	Germany	0	2
15	Bryan Coquard	France	0	2
16	Shane Archbold	New Zealand	0	0
17	Vladimir Tuychiev	Uzbekistan	0	0
18	Bobby Lea	United States	0	0
19	Sam Harrison	United Kingdom	0	0
20	Tim Veldt	Netherlands	−1	−20
–	Alois Kaňkovský	Czech Republic	−2	DNF
–	Rafał Ratajczyk	Poland	−1	DNF

=== Elimination Race ===
The Elimination Race was held at 21:50.

Rank	Name	Nation
1	Bryan Coquard	France
2	Elia Viviani	Italy
3	Luis Mansilla	Chile
4	Shane Archbold	New Zealand
5	Michael Freiberg	Australia
6	Eloy Teruel Rovira	Spain
7	Sam Harrison	United Kingdom
8	Kazuhiro Mori	Japan
9	Erik Mohs	Germany
10	Gijs van Hoecke	Belgium
11	Ioannis Tamouridis	Greece
12	Juan Esteban Arango	Colombia
13	Alois Kaňkovský	Czech Republic
14	Zachary Bell	Canada
15	Martyn Irvine	Ireland
16	Bobby Lea	United States
17	Vladimir Tuychiev	Uzbekistan
18	Tim Veldt	Netherlands
19	Kwok Ho Ting	Hong Kong
20	Lasse Norman Hansen	Denmark
21	Alexei Markov	Russia
–	Rafał Ratajczyk	Poland

=== Individual Pursuit ===
The Individual Pursuit was held at 10:30.

Rank	Name	Nation	Time
1	Alexei Markov	Russia	4:25.025
2	Shane Archbold	New Zealand	4:25.826
3	Lasse Norman Hansen	Denmark	4:28.693
4	Juan Esteban Arango	Colombia	4:30.002
5	Michael Freiberg	Australia	4:30.142
6	Eloy Teruel Rovira	Spain	4:30.642
7	Martyn Irvine	Ireland	4:33.007
8	Gijs van Hoecke	Belgium	4:33.285
9	Tim Veldt	Netherlands	4:35.933
10	Zachary Bell	Canada	4:36.301
11	Elia Viviani	Italy	4:36.467
12	Ioannis Tamouridis	Greece	4:36.661
13	Kwok Ho Ting	Hong Kong	4:38.968
14	Sam Harrison	United Kingdom	4:39.497
15	Luis Mansilla	Chile	4:39.825
16	Alois Kaňkovský	Czech Republic	4:41.121
17	Erik Mohs	Germany	4:42.622
18	Bobby Lea	United States	4:44.086
19	Bryan Coquard	France	4:45.636
20	Vladimir Tuychiev	Uzbekistan	4:47.395

=== Scratch Race ===
The Scratch Race was held at 15:10.

Rank	Name	Nation	Laps down
1	Michael Freiberg	Australia	
2	Eloy Teruel Rovira	Spain	
3	Gijs van Hoecke	Belgium	
4	Alexei Markov	Russia	
5	Kwok Ho Ting	Hong Kong	
6	Zachary Bell	Canada	
7	Ioannis Tamouridis	Greece	
8	Elia Viviani	Italy	–1
9	Juan Esteban Arango	Colombia	–1
10	Vladimir Tuychiev	Uzbekistan	–1
11	Shane Archbold	New Zealand	–1
12	Bryan Coquard	France	–1
13	Luis Mansilla	Chile	–1
14	Martyn Irvine	Ireland	–1
15	Tim Veldt	Netherlands	–1
16	Lasse Norman Hansen	Denmark	–1
17	Sam Harrison	United Kingdom	–1
18	Erik Mohs	Germany	–1
19	Kazuhiro Mori	Japan	–1
–	Bobby Lea	United States	DNF
–	Alois Kaňkovský	Czech Republic	DNF

=== Time Trial ===
The Time Trial was held at 16:35.

Rank	Name	Nation	Time
1	Shane Archbold	New Zealand	1:03.879
2	Tim Veldt	Netherlands	1:04.093
3	Sam Harrison	United Kingdom	1:04.325
4	Juan Esteban Arango	Colombia	1:04.338
5	Gijs van Hoecke	Belgium	1:04.451
6	Michael Freiberg	Australia	1:04.729
7	Bryan Coquard	France	1:04.999
8	Martyn Irvine	Ireland	1:05.095
9	Zachary Bell	Canada	1:05.099
10	Lasse Norman Hansen	Denmark	1:05.349
11	Alois Kaňkovský	Czech Republic	1:05.499
12	Elia Viviani	Italy	1:05.598
13	Alexei Markov	Russia	1:05.696
14	Eloy Teruel Rovira	Spain	1:06.007
15	Luis Mansilla	Chile	1:06.568
16	Erik Mohs	Germany	1:06.776
17	Ioannis Tamouridis	Greece	1:06.911
18	Bobby Lea	United States	1:07.142
19	Kwok Ho Ting	Hong Kong	1:09.224
20	Kazuhiro Mori	Japan	1:09.442
21	Vladimir Tuychiev	Uzbekistan	1:11.310

=== Standings ===
Rank	Name	Nation	Total
1st place, gold medalist(s)	Michael Freiberg	Australia	34
2nd place, silver medalist(s)	Shane Archbold	New Zealand	38
3rd place, bronze medalist(s)	Gijs van Hoecke	Belgium	41
4	Eloy Teruel Rovira	Spain	46
5	Juan Esteban Arango	Colombia	47
6	Zachary Bell	Canada	52
7	Elia Viviani	Italy	52
8	Bryan Coquard	France	56
9	Alexei Markov	Russia	59
10	Martyn Irvine	Ireland	62
11	Lasse Norman Hansen	Denmark	63
12	Sam Harrison	United Kingdom	66
13	Luis Mansilla	Chile	67
14	Tim Veldt	Netherlands	69
15	Ioannis Tamouridis	Greece	73
16	Kwok Ho Ting	Hong Kong	86
17	Erik Mohs	Germany	87
18	Kazuhiro Mori	Japan	101
19	Vladimir Tuychiev	Uzbekistan	107
20	Bobby Lea	United States	123
21	Alois Kaňkovský	Czech Republic	128
22	Rafał Ratajczyk	Poland	DNF
