= 2012 UCI Track Cycling World Championships – Men's omnium =

Sports

Rainbow jersey

The Men's omnium at the 2012 UCI Track Cycling World Championships was held on April 5–6. 24 athletes participated in the contest.

== Medalists ==
Gold	Glenn O'Shea (AUS)
Silver	Zachary Bell (CAN)
Bronze	Lasse Norman Hansen (DEN)

== Individual Event Results ==
=== Flying Lap ===
The race was held at 16:35.

Rank	Name	Nation	Time
1	Ed Clancy	United Kingdom	12.881
2	Shane Archbold	New Zealand	13.086
3	Glenn O'Shea	Australia	13.137
4	Bryan Coquard	France	13.168
5	Zachary Bell	Canada	13.270
6	Nikias Arndt	Germany	13.276
7	Lasse Norman Hansen	Denmark	13.292
8	Martyn Irvine	Ireland	13.409
9	Elia Viviani	Italy	13.418
10	Cho Ho-Sung	South Korea	13.419
11	Liu Hao	China	13.450
12	Gijs van Hoecke	Belgium	13.462
13	Bobby Lea	United States	13.464
14	Wu Po Hung	Chinese Taipei	13.477
15	Carlos Linares	Venezuela	13.477
16	Michael Vingerling	Netherlands	13.518
17	Recep Ünalan	Turkey	13.605
18	Eloy Teruel Rovira	Spain	13.614
19	Cristopher Mansilla	Chile	13.662
20	Rafał Ratajczyk	Poland	13.676
21	Choi Ki Ho	Hong Kong	13.847
22	Taiji Nishitani	Japan	13.912
23	Alexey Lyalko	Kazakhstan	13.972
24	Walter Pérez	Argentina	14.019

=== Points Race ===
The race was held at 19:45.

Rank	Name	Nation	Laps	Points
1	Elia Viviani	Italy	1	43
2	Eloy Teruel Rovira	Spain	1	34
3	Zachary Bell	Canada	1	29
4	Cho Ho-Sung	South Korea	1	26
5	Glenn O'Shea	Australia	0	17
6	Lasse Norman Hansen	Denmark	0	10
7	Ed Clancy	United Kingdom	0	9
8	Martyn Irvine	Ireland	0	7
9	Cristopher Mansilla	Chile	0	7
10	Rafał Ratajczyk	Poland	0	5
11	Liu Hao	China	0	5
12	Gijs van Hoecke	Belgium	0	1
13	Recep Ünalan	Turkey	0	1
14	Choi Ki Ho	Hong Kong	0	0
15	Carlos Linares	Venezuela	0	0
16	Shane Archbold	New Zealand	−1	−18
17	Nikias Arndt	Germany	−1	−18
18	Walter Pérez	Argentina	−1	−18
19	Alexey Lyalko	Kazakhstan	−1	−20
20	Michael Vingerling	Netherlands	−1	−20
21	Bobby Lea	United States	−1	−20
22	Taiji Nishitani	Japan	−1	−20
23	Bryan Coquard	France	−2	−28
24	Wu Po Hung	Chinese Taipei	−2	DNF

=== Elimination Race ===
The race was held at 23:00.

Rank	Name	Nation
1	Bryan Coquard	France
2	Glenn O'Shea	Australia
3	Rafał Ratajczyk	Poland
4	Gijs van Hoecke	Belgium
5	Cho Ho-Sung	South Korea
6	Shane Archbold	New Zealand
7	Recep Ünalan	Turkey
8	Zachary Bell	Canada
9	Elia Viviani	Italy
10	Ed Clancy	United Kingdom
11	Lasse Norman Hansen	Denmark
12	Walter Pérez	Argentina
13	Taiji Nishitani	Japan
14	Martyn Irvine	Ireland
15	Carlos Linares	Venezuela
16	Cristopher Mansilla	Chile
17	Liu Hao	China
18	Choi Ki Ho	Hong Kong
19	Bobby Lea	United States
20	Wu Po Hung	Chinese Taipei
21	Michael Vingerling	Netherlands
22	Nikias Arndt	Germany
23	Eloy Teruel Rovira	Spain
24	Alexey Lyalko	Kazakhstan

=== Individual Pursuit ===
The race was held at 15:00.

Rank	Name	Nation	Time
1	Lasse Norman Hansen	Denmark	4:22.330
2	Zachary Bell	Canada	4:26.786
3	Ed Clancy	United Kingdom	4:27.643
4	Martyn Irvine	Ireland	4:28.158
5	Nikias Arndt	Germany	4:28.240
6	Glenn O'Shea	Australia	4:28.919
7	Shane Archbold	New Zealand	4:29.248
8	Cho Ho-Sung	South Korea	4:29.383
9	Eloy Teruel Rovira	Spain	4:29.692
10	Rafał Ratajczyk	Poland	4:31.101
11	Gijs van Hoecke	Belgium	4:33.112
12	Carlos Linares	Venezuela	4:33.724
13	Bobby Lea	United States	4:34.307
14	Alexey Lyalko	Kazakhstan	4:35.333
15	Bryan Coquard	France	4:35.757
16	Cristopher Mansilla	Chile	4:37.348
17	Taiji Nishitani	Japan	4:37.450
18	Michael Vingerling	Netherlands	4:38.602
19	Recep Ünalan	Turkey	4:39.043
20	Liu Hao	China	4:39.173
21	Walter Pérez	Argentina	4:40.327
22	Choi Ki Ho	Hong Kong	4:42.969
23	Wu Po Hung	Chinese Taipei	4:45.796
	Elia Viviani	Italy	DNS

=== Scratch Race ===
The race was held at 19:50.

Rank	Name	Nation	Laps down
1	Lasse Norman Hansen	Denmark	
2	Zachary Bell	Canada	
3	Shane Archbold	New Zealand	
4	Glenn O'Shea	Australia	
5	Eloy Teruel Rovira	Spain	
6	Walter Pérez	Argentina	−1
7	Ed Clancy	United Kingdom	−1
8	Liu Hao	China	−1
9	Martyn Irvine	Ireland	−1
10	Cho Ho-Sung	South Korea	−1
11	Cristopher Mansilla	Chile	−1
12	Carlos Linares	Venezuela	−1
13	Bryan Coquard	France	−1
14	Gijs van Hoecke	Belgium	−1
15	Taiji Nishitani	Japan	−1
16	Rafał Ratajczyk	Poland	−1
17	Choi Ki Ho	Hong Kong	−1
18	Alexey Lyalko	Kazakhstan	−1
19	Michael Vingerling	Netherlands	−1
20	Nikias Arndt	Germany	−1
21	Recep Ünalan	Turkey	−1
22	Bobby Lea	United States	−1
–	Wu Po Hung	Chinese Taipei	DNF

=== 1 km Time Trial ===
The race was held at 21:45.

Rank	Name	Nation	Time
1	Ed Clancy	United Kingdom	1:01.948
2	Glenn O'Shea	Australia	1:03.042
3	Lasse Norman Hansen	Denmark	1:03.102
4	Shane Archbold	New Zealand	1:03.373
5	Bryan Coquard	France	1:03.510
6	Martyn Irvine	Ireland	1:04.081
7	Cho Ho-Sung	South Korea	1:04.134
8	Zachary Bell	Canada	1:04.216
9	Gijs van Hoecke	Belgium	1:04.235
10	Liu Hao	China	1:04.810
11	Cristopher Mansilla	Chile	1:05.081
12	Recep Ünalan	Turkey	1:05.099
13	Bobby Lea	United States	1:05.106
14	Nikias Arndt	Germany	1:05.305
15	Eloy Teruel Rovira	Spain	1:05.829
16	Carlos Linares	Venezuela	1:05.885
17	Michael Vingerling	Netherlands	1:06.091
18	Alexey Lyalko	Kazakhstan	1:06.407
19	Wu Po Hung	Chinese Taipei	1:06.746
20	Taiji Nishitani	Japan	1:06.749
21	Choi Ki Ho	Hong Kong	1:06.988
22	Rafał Ratajczyk	Poland	1:12.351
23	Walter Pérez	Argentina	1:12.534

=== Standings ===
Final results.

Rank	Name	Nation	Points
1st place, gold medalist(s)	Glenn O'Shea	Australia	22
2nd place, silver medalist(s)	Zachary Bell	Canada	28
3rd place, bronze medalist(s)	Lasse Norman Hansen	Denmark	29
4	Ed Clancy	United Kingdom	29
5	Shane Archbold	New Zealand	38
6	Cho Ho-Sung	South Korea	44
7	Martyn Irvine	Ireland	49
8	Bryan Coquard	France	61
9	Gijs van Hoecke	Belgium	62
10	Eloy Teruel Rovira	Spain	72
11	Liu Hao	China	77
12	Rafał Ratajczyk	Poland	81
13	Cristopher Mansilla	Chile	82
14	Nikias Arndt	Germany	84
15	Carlos Linares	Venezuela	85
16	Recep Ünalan	Turkey	89
17	Bobby Lea	United States	101
18	Walter Pérez	Argentina	104
19	Taiji Nishitani	Japan	109
20	Michael Vingerling	Netherlands	111
21	Choi Ki Ho	Hong Kong	113
22	Alexey Lyalko	Kazakhstan	116
23	Wu Po Hung	Chinese Taipei	171
	Elia Viviani	Italy	DNF
