= 2013 UCI Track Cycling World Championships – Men's omnium =

Rainbow jersey

The Men's omnium at the 2013 UCI Track Cycling World Championships was held February 22–23. 19 athletes participated in the contest. The final standings were determined by adding ranks in the six events.

== Medalists ==
Gold	Aaron Gate (NZL)
Silver	Lasse Norman Hansen (DEN)
Bronze	Glenn O'Shea (AUS)

== Individual event results ==
=== Flying Lap ===
250m flying start; the race was held at 14:30.

Rank	Name	Nation	Time
1	Aaron Gate	New Zealand	13.109
2	Lasse Norman Hansen	Denmark	13.121
3	Glenn O'Shea	Australia	13.173
4	Lucas Liss	Germany	13.183
5	Artur Ershov	Russia	13.323
6	Hao Liu	China	13.349
7	Loïc Perizzolo	Switzerland	13.426
8	Ondřej Rybín	Czech Republic	13.444
9	Tim Veldt	Netherlands	13.459
10	Jasper De Buyst	Belgium	13.555
11	Jonathan Dibben	United Kingdom	13.587
12	Unai Elorriaga Zubiaur	Spain	13.633
13	Juan Esteban Arango	Colombia	13.643
13	Vivien Brisse	France	13.643
15	Artyom Zakharov	Kazakhstan	13.718
16	Raman Tsishkou	Belarus	13.765
17	Paolo Simion	Italy	14.045
18	Kwok Ho Ting	Hong Kong	14.094
19	Volodymyr Kogut	Ukraine	14.687

=== Points Race ===
The points race was 120 laps (30 km) with 12 sprints; the race was held at 15:35.

Rank	Name	Nation	Points
1	Glenn O'Shea	Australia	18
2	Lasse Norman Hansen	Denmark	14
3	Vivien Brisse	France	13
4	Unai Elorriaga Zubiaur	Spain	12
5	Kwok Ho Ting	Hong Kong	10
6	Jasper De Buyst	Belgium	8
7	Tim Veldt	Netherlands	7
8	Aaron Gate	New Zealand	7
9	Artur Ershov	Russia	7
10	Lucas Liss	Germany	6
11	Jonathan Dibben	United Kingdom	5
12	Hao Liu	China	5
13	Volodymyr Kogut	Ukraine	5
14	Artyom Zakharov	Kazakhstan	2
15	Raman Tsishkou	Belarus	2
16	Loïc Perizzolo	Switzerland	2
17	Paolo Simion	Italy	−20
DNF	Juan Esteban Arango	Colombia	
DNF	Ondřej Rybín	Czech Republic	

=== Elimination Race ===
An elimination race ended day one; the race was held at 21:45.

Rank	Name	Nation
1	Tim Veldt	Netherlands
2	Aaron Gate	New Zealand
3	Glenn O'Shea	Australia
4	Lucas Liss	Germany
5	Kwok Ho Ting	Hong Kong
6	Lasse Norman Hansen	Denmark
7	Raman Tsishkou	Belarus
8	Ondřej Rybín	Czech Republic
9	Jonathan Dibben	United Kingdom
10	Artur Ershov	Russia
11	Unai Elorriaga Zubiaur	Spain
12	Vivien Brisse	France
13	Loïc Perizzolo	Switzerland
14	Jasper De Buyst	Belgium
15	Artyom Zakharov	Kazakhstan
16	Volodymyr Kogut	Ukraine
17	Juan Esteban Arango	Colombia
18	Paolo Simion	Italy
DSQ	Hao Liu	China

=== Individual Pursuit ===
4 km individual pursuit started day two; the race was held at 13:55.

Rank	Name	Nation	Time
1	Aaron Gate	New Zealand	4:21.607
2	Lasse Norman Hansen	Denmark	4:22.736
3	Artur Ershov	Russia	4:25.922
4	Glenn O'Shea	Australia	4:26.376
5	Jonathan Dibben	United Kingdom	4:28.674
6	Unai Elorriaga Zubiaur	Spain	4:29.784
7	Jasper De Buyst	Belgium	4:31.162
8	Tim Veldt	Netherlands	4:31.192
9	Juan Esteban Arango	Colombia	4:33.195
10	Artyom Zakharov	Kazakhstan	4:33.435
11	Lucas Liss	Germany	4:34.498
12	Loïc Perizzolo	Switzerland	4:35.557
13	Volodymyr Kogut	Ukraine	4:36.603
14	Vivien Brisse	France	4:41.020
15	Raman Tsishkou	Belarus	4:42.172
16	Kwok Ho Ting	Hong Kong	4:44.558
17	Ondřej Rybín	Czech Republic	4:46.152
18	Paolo Simion	Italy	4:46.223

=== Scratch Race ===
A 15 km scratch race was the second event on day two; the race was held at 16:45.

Rank	Name	Nation	Laps down
1	Jonathan Dibben	United Kingdom	
2	Jasper De Buyst	Belgium	
3	Kwok Ho Ting	Hong Kong	−1
4	Lucas Liss	Germany	−1
5	Aaron Gate	New Zealand	−1
6	Glenn O'Shea	Australia	−1
7	Lasse Norman Hansen	Denmark	−1
8	Artur Ershov	Russia	−1
9	Tim Veldt	Netherlands	−1
10	Artyom Zakharov	Kazakhstan	−1
11	Unai Elorriaga Zubiaur	Spain	−1
12	Vivien Brisse	France	−1
13	Loïc Perizzolo	Switzerland	−1
14	Juan Esteban Arango	Colombia	DNF
14	Volodymyr Kogut	Ukraine	DNF
14	Ondřej Rybín	Czech Republic	DNF
14	Paolo Simion	Italy	DNF
14	Raman Tsishkou	Belarus	DNF

=== 1 km Time Trial ===
The last event was 1 km time trial; the race was held at 20:25.

Rank	Name	Nation	Time
1	Aaron Gate	New Zealand	1:02.271
2	Lasse Norman Hansen	Denmark	1:02.437
3	Lucas Liss	Germany	1:02.949
4	Tim Veldt	Netherlands	1:03.200
5	Glenn O'Shea	Australia	1:03.625
6	Loïc Perizzolo	Switzerland	1:04.142
7	Artur Ershov	Russia	1:04.491
8	Ondřej Rybín	Czech Republic	1:04.633
9	Jasper De Buyst	Belgium	1:04.722
10	Juan Esteban Arango	Colombia	1:04.740
11	Artyom Zakharov	Kazakhstan	1:04.867
12	Jonathan Dibben	United Kingdom	1:05.141
13	Unai Elorriaga Zubiaur	Spain	1:05.690
14	Vivien Brisse	France	1:06.180
15	Raman Tsishkou	Belarus	1:06.332
16	Kwok Ho Ting	Hong Kong	1:06.442
17	Paolo Simion	Italy	1:06.479
18	Volodymyr Kogut	Ukraine	1:08.224

== Final standings ==
The final result after six events.

Rank	Name	Nation	Points
1st place, gold medalist(s)	Aaron Gate	New Zealand	18
2nd place, silver medalist(s)	Lasse Norman Hansen	Denmark	21
3rd place, bronze medalist(s)	Glenn O'Shea	Australia	22
4	Lucas Liss	Germany	36
5	Tim Veldt	Netherlands	38
6	Artur Ershov	Russia	42
7	Jasper De Buyst	Belgium	48
8	Jonathan Dibben	United Kingdom	49
9	Unai Elorriaga Zubiaur	Spain	57
10	Kwok Ho Ting	Hong Kong	63
11	Loïc Perizzolo	Switzerland	67
12	Vivien Brisse	France	69
13	Artyom Zakharov	Kazakhstan	75
14	Raman Tsishkou	Belarus	101
15	Volodymyr Kogut	Ukraine	112
16	Ondřej Rybín	Czech Republic	112
17	Juan Esteban Arango	Colombia	119
18	Paolo Simion	Italy	120
DSQ	Hao Liu	China	
