= Cycling at the 2012 Summer Olympics – Men's omnium =

Men's omnium at the Games of the XXX Olympiad
- Venue: London Velopark
- Date: 4 to 5 August
- Competitors: 18 from 18 nations
- Winning points: 27

Medalists
1st place, gold medalist(s)		Lasse Norman Hansen	Denmark
2nd place, silver medalist(s)		Bryan Coquard	France
3rd place, bronze medalist(s)		Ed Clancy	Great Britain

The men's cycling omnium at the 2012 Olympic Games in London took place at the London Velopark on 4 and 5 August.

Lasse Norman Hansen from Denmark won the gold medal. France's Bryan Coquard won silver and Ed Clancy from Great Britain took bronze.

== Competition format ==
The omnium competition consisted of six events, with a point-for-place system. In case of a tie on points the time trial counts.

- Flying lap: an individual time trial over 250 m (820.2 ft) with a "flying start".
- Points race: a 30 km (18.6 mi) points race, with scoring for intermediate sprints as well as for lapping the pack.
- Elimination race: a "miss-and-out" elimination race, with the last rider in every sprint (each two laps) eliminated.
- Individual pursuit: a 4 km (2.5 mi) individual pursuit, with placing based on time.
- Scratch race: a 15 km (9.3 mi) scratch race, with all riders competing at once and first across the line winning.
- Time trial: a 1 km (0.6 mi) time trial, with two riders (starting opposite the track) riding at once.

== Schedule ==
All times are British Summer Time

Date	Time	Round
Saturday 4 August 2012	10:25; 17:00; 18:25	Flying lap 30 km points race Elimination race
Sunday 5 August 2012	10:00; 17:00; 18:10	4 km individual pursuit 15 km scratch race 1 km time trial

== Overall results ==
Rank	Rider	Country	FL	PR	ER	IP	SR	TT	Total
1st place, gold medalist(s)	Lasse Norman Hansen	Denmark	4	2	12	1	6	2	27
2nd place, silver medalist(s)	Bryan Coquard	France	5	4	1	12	3	4	29
3rd place, bronze medalist(s)	Ed Clancy	Great Britain	1	11	5	2	10	1	30
4	Roger Kluge	Germany	11	1	7	5	4	5	33
5	Glenn O'Shea	Australia	3	8	3	3	14	3	34
6	Elia Viviani	Italy	6	5	2	7	5	9	34
7	Shane Archbold	New Zealand	2	15	6	6	13	6	48
8	Zachary Bell	Canada	7	13	10	8	1	10	49
9	Eloy Teruel	Spain	14	3	17	9	2	14	59
10	Juan Esteban Arango	Colombia	8	17	13	4	11	7	60
11	Cho Ho-sung	South Korea	12	10	9	13	8	8	60
12	Bobby Lea	United States	10	12	8	11	7	13	61
13	Martyn Irvine	Ireland	9	6	15	14	9	11	64
14	Walter Pérez	Argentina	17	7	4	15	12	17	72
15	Gijs van Hoecke	Belgium	13	9	18	10	15	12	77
16	Choi Ki Ho	Hong Kong	15	14	11	17	17	15	89
17	Carlos Linarez	Venezuela	16	16	14	16	18	16	96
18	Luis Mansilla	Chile	18	18	16	18	16	18	104

FL: 250m flying lap. PR: Points race. ER: Elimination race.
IP: 4000m individual pursuit. SR: Scratch race. TT: 1000m time trial.

== Event results ==
=== Flying lap ===
Rank	Rider	Time
1	Ed Clancy (GBR)	12.556
2	Shane Archbold (NZL)	13.112
3	Glenn O'Shea (AUS)	13.222
4	Lasse Norman Hansen (DEN)	13.236
5	Bryan Coquard (FRA)	13.347
6	Elia Viviani (ITA)	13.359
7	Zachary Bell (CAN)	13.406
8	Juan Esteban Arango (COL)	13.469
9	Martyn Irvine (IRL)	13.504
10	Bobby Lea (USA)	13.559
11	Roger Kluge (GER)	13.571
12	Cho Ho-Sung (KOR)	13.614
13	Gijs van Hoecke (BEL)	13.633
14	Eloy Teruel (ESP)	13.655
15	Choi Ki Ho (HKG)	13.659
16	Carlos Linarez (VEN)	13.863
17	Walter Pérez (ARG)	14.036
18	Luis Mansilla (CHI)	14.270

=== Points race ===
Rank	Rider	Laps	Points
1	Roger Kluge (GER)	3	79
2	Lasse Norman Hansen (DEN)	2	59
3	Eloy Teruel (ESP)	2	55
4	Bryan Coquard (FRA)	2	51
5	Elia Viviani (ITA)	2	47
6	Martyn Irvine (IRL)	2	47
7	Walter Pérez (ARG)	1	26
8	Glenn O'Shea (AUS)	1	25
9	Gijs van Hoecke (BEL)	1	23
10	Cho Ho-Sung (KOR)	1	20
11	Ed Clancy (GBR)	0	18
12	Bobby Lea (USA)	0	8
13	Zachary Bell (CAN)	0	4
14	Shane Archbold (NZL)	0	3
15	Choi Ki Ho (HKG)	0	3
16	Carlos Linarez (VEN)	−1	−18
17	Juan Esteban Arango (COL)	−1	−18
18	Luis Mansilla (CHI)	−2	−40

=== Elimination race ===
Rank	Rider
1	Bryan Coquard (FRA)
2	Elia Viviani (ITA)
3	Glenn O'Shea (AUS)
4	Walter Pérez (ARG)
5	Ed Clancy (GBR)
6	Shane Archbold (NZL)
7	Roger Kluge (GER)
8	Bobby Lea (USA)
9	Cho Ho-Sung (KOR)
10	Zachary Bell (CAN)
11	Choi Ki Ho (HKG)
12	Lasse Norman Hansen (DEN)
13	Juan Esteban Arango (COL)
14	Carlos Linarez (VEN)
15	Martyn Irvine (IRL)
16	Luis Mansilla (CHI)
17	Eloy Teruel (ESP)
18	Gijs van Hoecke (BEL)

=== Individual pursuit ===
Rank	Rider	Time
1	Lasse Norman Hansen (DEN)	4:20.674
2	Ed Clancy (GBR)	4:20.853
3	Glenn O'Shea (AUS)	4:24.811
4	Juan Esteban Arango (COL)	4:25.477
5	Roger Kluge (GER)	4:25.554
6	Shane Archbold (NZL)	4:26.581
7	Elia Viviani (ITA)	4:28.499
8	Zachary Bell (CAN)	4:29.411
9	Eloy Teruel (ESP)	4:29.874
10	Gijs van Hoecke (BEL)	4:29.992
11	Bobby Lea (USA)	4:30.127
12	Bryan Coquard (FRA)	4:30.780
13	Cho Ho-Sung (KOR)	4:32.382
14	Martyn Irvine (IRL)	4:32.948
15	Walter Pérez (ARG)	4:33.532
16	Carlos Linarez (VEN)	4:36.477
17	Choi Ki Ho (HKG)	4:38.707
18	Luis Mansilla (CHI)	4:53.230

=== Scratch race ===
Rank	Rider	Laps down
1	Zachary Bell (CAN)	0
2	Eloy Teruel (ESP)	0
3	Bryan Coquard (FRA)	0
4	Roger Kluge (GER)	0
5	Elia Viviani (ITA)	0
6	Lasse Norman Hansen (DEN)	0
7	Bobby Lea (USA)	0
8	Cho Ho-Sung (KOR)	0
9	Martyn Irvine (IRL)	0
10	Ed Clancy (GBR)	−1
11	Juan Esteban Arango (COL)	−1
12	Walter Pérez (ARG)	−1
13	Shane Archbold (NZL)	−1
14	Glenn O'Shea (AUS)	−1
15	Gijs van Hoecke (BEL)	−1
16	Luis Mansilla (CHI)	−1
17	Choi Ki Ho (HKG)	−1
18	Carlos Linarez (VEN)	−1

=== Time trial ===
Rank	Rider	Time
1	Ed Clancy (GBR)	1:00.981
2	Lasse Norman Hansen (DEN)	1:02.314
3	Glenn O'Shea (AUS)	1:02.513
4	Bryan Coquard (FRA)	1:03.078
5	Roger Kluge (GER)	1:03.144
6	Shane Archbold (NZL)	1:03.290
7	Juan Esteban Arango (COL)	1:03.793
8	Cho Ho-Sung (KOR)	1:04.150
9	Elia Viviani (ITA)	1:04.239
10	Zachary Bell (CAN)	1:04.328
11	Martyn Irvine (IRL)	1:04.558
12	Gijs van Hoecke (BEL)	1:04.748
13	Bobby Lea (USA)	1:04.853
14	Eloy Teruel (ESP)	1:05.463
15	Choi Ki Ho (HKG)	1:06.071
16	Carlos Linarez (VEN)	1:06.773
17	Walter Pérez (ARG)	1:07.523
18	Luis Mansilla (CHI)	1:08.517
