= UCI Track Cycling World Championships – Men's omnium =

Event at World Championships

The Men's omnium at the UCI Track Cycling World Championships was first competed in 2007 in Spain.

Until 20 June 2014, the Omnium consisted of six events: a one-lap flying start time trial, 5 km scratch race, an elimination race known as "the Devil", a 4 km individual pursuit, a 15 km points race, and a 1 km time trial. The placing a rider achieves in each event is converted to points, and the rider with the fewest points at the end of the competition wins. Prior to the introduction of "the Devil" in 2011, the Omnium consisted of five events.

Effective 20 June 2014, the Omnium consists of six events: a scratch race, a 5 km individual pursuit, an elimination race, a one-lap flying start time trial, a 1 km time trial, and a points race. For the first five events, riders are awarded 40, 38, 36 etc. points for 1st, 2nd 3rd etc. place. Riders ranked 21st and below are awarded 1 point. To this total, riders can add and subtract points based on laps gained and lost and points won in sprints in the Points race. The rider with the highest total of points is the winner.

Four riders have won the event twice, Benjamin Thomas of France, Ethan Hayter of Great Britain, Fernando Gaviria of Colombia and Iúri Leitão of Portugal. Of these, Thomas, with two golds and three silvers has the best record in the event.

== Medalists ==
Championships	Winner	Runner-up	Third
2007 Palma de Mallorca	Alois Kaňkovský (CZE)	Walter Pérez (ARG)	Charles Bradley Huff (USA)
2008 Manchester	Hayden Godfrey (NZL)	Leigh Howard (AUS)	Aliaksandr Lisouski (BLR)
2009 Pruszków	Leigh Howard (AUS)	Zachary Bell (CAN)	Tim Veldt (NED)
2010 Ballerup	Ed Clancy (GBR)	Leigh Howard (AUS)	Taylor Phinney (USA)
2011 Apeldoorn	Michael Freiberg (AUS)	Shane Archbold (NZL)	Gijs van Hoecke (BEL)
2012 Melbourne	Glenn O'Shea (AUS)	Zachary Bell (CAN)	Lasse Norman Hansen (DEN)
2013 Minsk	Aaron Gate (NZL)	Lasse Norman Hansen (DEN)	Glenn O'Shea (AUS)
2014 Cali	Thomas Boudat (FRA)	Tim Veldt (NED)	Viktor Manakov (RUS)
2015 Yvelines	Fernando Gaviria (COL)	Glenn O'Shea (AUS)	Elia Viviani (ITA)
2016 London	Fernando Gaviria (COL)	Roger Kluge (GER)	Glenn O'Shea (AUS)
2017 Hong Kong	Benjamin Thomas (FRA)	Aaron Gate (NZL)	Albert Torres (ESP)
2018 Apeldoorn	Szymon Sajnok (POL)	Jan-Willem van Schip (NED)	Simone Consonni (ITA)
2019 Pruszków	Campbell Stewart (NZL)	Benjamin Thomas (FRA)	Ethan Hayter (GBR)
2020 Berlin	Benjamin Thomas (FRA)	Jan-Willem van Schip (NED)	Matthew Walls (GBR)
2021 Roubaix	Ethan Hayter (GBR)	Aaron Gate (NZL)	Elia Viviani (ITA)
2022 Saint-Quentin-en-Yvelines	Ethan Hayter (GBR)	Benjamin Thomas (FRA)	Aaron Gate (NZL)
2023 Glasgow	Iúri Leitão (POR)	Benjamin Thomas (FRA)	Shunsuke Imamura (JPN)
2024 Ballerup	Lindsay De Vylder (BEL)	Simone Consonni (ITA)	Yanne Dorenbos (NED)
2025 Santiago	Albert Torres (ESP)	Kazushige Kuboki (JPN)	Lindsay De Vylder (BEL)
2026 Shanghai	Iúri Leitão (POR)	Fabio Van Den Bossche (BEL)	Tim Torn Teutenberg (GER)

== Medal table ==
Rank	Nation	Gold	Silver	Bronze	Total
1	Australia	3	3	2	8
2	New Zealand	3	3	1	7
3	France	3	3	0	6
4	Great Britain	3	0	2	5
5	Colombia	2	0	0	2
5	Portugal	2	0	0	2
7	Belgium	1	1	2	4
8	Spain	1	0	1	2
9	Czech Republic	1	0	0	1
9	Poland	1	0	0	1
11	Netherlands	0	3	2	5
12	Canada	0	2	0	2
13	Italy	0	1	3	4
14	Denmark	0	1	1	2
14	Germany	0	1	1	2
14	Japan	0	1	1	2
17	Argentina	0	1	0	1
18	United States	0	0	2	2
19	Belarus	0	0	1	1
19	Russia	0	0	1	1
Totals (20 entries)		20	20	20	60
