= Cycling at the 2016 Summer Olympics – Men's omnium =

Men's Omnium at the Games of the XXXI Olympiad
- Venue: Rio Olympic Velodrome
- Date: 14–15 August 2016
- Competitors: 18 from 18 nations
- Winning points: 207

Medalists
| 1st place, gold medalist(s) | | Elia Viviani | Italy |
| 2nd place, silver medalist(s) | | Mark Cavendish | Great Britain |
| 3rd place, bronze medalist(s) | | Lasse Norman Hansen | Denmark |

The men's cycling omnium at the 2016 Olympic Games in Rio de Janeiro took place at the Rio Olympic Velodrome on 14 and 15 August.

The medals were presented by Marisol Casado, IOC member, Spain and Renato Di Rocco, Member of the UCI Management Committee.

== Competition format ==
The omnium competition consists of six events. During the first five events, riders receive points depending on their place, while during the final points race they can obtain points by winning sprints and taking laps during the event.

- Scratch race: a 15 km (9.3 mi) scratch race, with all riders competing at once and first across the line winning.
- Individual pursuit: a 4 km (2.5 mi) individual pursuit, with placing based on time.
- Elimination race: a "miss-and-out" elimination race, with the last rider in every sprint (each two laps) eliminated.
- Time trial: a 1 km (0.6 mi) time trial, with two riders (starting opposite the track) riding at once.
- Flying lap: an individual time trial over 250 m (820.2 ft) with a "flying start".
- Points race: a 40 km (24.9 mi) points race, with scoring for intermediate sprints as well as for lapping the pack.

== Schedule ==
All times are Brasília Time (UTC−03:00)

| Date | Time | Round |
|---|---|---|
| Sunday 14 August 2016 | 16:40; 17:50; 19:15 | 15 km scratch race 4 km individual pursuit Elimination race |
| Monday 15 August 2016 | 10:21; 16:00; 17:23 | 1 km time trial Flying lap 40 km points race |

== Overall results ==
Final standings after all six events.

| Rank | Rider | SR | IP | ER | TT | FL | PR | Total |
|---|---|---|---|---|---|---|---|---|
| 1st place, gold medalist(s) | Elia Viviani (ITA) | 28 | 36 | 40 | 36 | 38 | 29 | 207 |
| 2nd place, silver medalist(s) | Mark Cavendish (GBR) | 30 | 38 | 28 | 30 | 36 | 32 | 194 |
| 3rd place, bronze medalist(s) | Lasse Norman Hansen (DEN) | 40 | 40 | 6 | 32 | 34 | 40 | 192 |
| 4 | Fernando Gaviria (COL) | 26 | 22 | 36 | 34 | 22 | 41 | 181 |
| 5 | Thomas Boudat (FRA) | 36 | 32 | 38 | 20 | 24 | 22 | 172 |
| 6 | Roger Kluge (GER) | 38 | 34 | 18 | 24 | 20 | 33 | 167 |
| 7 | Glenn O'Shea (AUS) | 34 | 20 | 22 | 38 | 30 | 0 | 144 |
| 8 | Dylan Kennett (NZL) | 32 | 30 | 8 | 40 | 40 | −7 | 143 |
| 9 | Tim Veldt (NED) | 10 | 28 | 10 | 28 | 28 | 7 | 111 |
| 10 | Artyom Zakharov (KAZ) | 22 | 12 | 32 | 22 | 16 | 7 | 111 |
| 11 | Leung Chun Wing (HKG) | 20 | 16 | 16 | 26 | 26 | 1 | 105 |
| 12 | Gaël Suter (SUI) | 12 | 8 | 26 | 16 | 32 | 1 | 95 |
| 13 | Gideoni Monteiro (BRA) | 14 | 24 | 30 | 10 | 12 | 4 | 94 |
| 14 | Kazushige Kuboki (JPN) | 18 | 6 | 34 | 12 | 10 | 1 | 81 |
| 15 | Ignacio Prado (MEX) | 16 | 14 | 24 | 8 | 8 | 3 | 73 |
| 16 | Park Sang-hoon (KOR) | 24 | 18 | 14 | 18 | 14 | DNF | DNF |
| 17 | Bobby Lea (USA) | 8 | 26 | 20 | 14 | 18 | DNF | DNF |
| 18 | Jasper De Buyst (BEL) | 6 | 10 | 12 | DNS | – | – | DNF |

SR: Scratch race. IP: 4000m individual pursuit. ER: Elimination race.
TT: 1000m time trial. FL: 250m flying lap. PR: Points race.

== Event results ==
=== Scratch race ===
| Rank | Rider | Laps down | Points |
|---|---|---|---|
| 1 | Lasse Norman Hansen (DEN) | 0 | 40 |
| 2 | Roger Kluge (GER) | 0 | 38 |
| 3 | Thomas Boudat (FRA) | −1 | 36 |
| 4 | Glenn O'Shea (AUS) | −1 | 34 |
| 5 | Dylan Kennett (NZL) | −1 | 32 |
| 6 | Mark Cavendish (GBR) | −1 | 30 |
| 7 | Elia Viviani (ITA) | −1 | 28 |
| 8 | Fernando Gaviria (COL) | −1 | 26 |
| 9 | Park Sang-hoon (KOR) | −1 | 24 |
| 10 | Artyom Zakharov (KAZ) | −1 | 22 |
| 11 | Leung Chun Wing (HKG) | −1 | 20 |
| 12 | Kazushige Kuboki (JPN) | −1 | 18 |
| 13 | Ignacio Prado (MEX) | −1 | 16 |
| 14 | Gideoni Monteiro (BRA) | −1 | 14 |
| 15 | Gaël Suter (SUI) | −1 | 12 |
| 16 | Tim Veldt (NED) | −1 | 10 |
| 17 | Bobby Lea (USA) | −1 | 8 |
| 18 | Jasper De Buyst (BEL) | −1 | 6 |

=== Individual pursuit ===
| Rank | Rider | Time | Points | Overall | Overall rank |
|---|---|---|---|---|---|
| 1 | Lasse Norman Hansen (DEN) | 4:14.982 OR | 40 | 80 | 1 |
| 2 | Mark Cavendish (GBR) | 4:16.878 | 38 | 68 | 3 |
| 3 | Elia Viviani (ITA) | 4:17.453 | 36 | 64 | 5 |
| 4 | Roger Kluge (GER) | 4:18.907 | 34 | 72 | 2 |
| 5 | Thomas Boudat (FRA) | 4:19.918 | 32 | 68 | 3 |
| 6 | Dylan Kennett (NZL) | 4:20.180 | 30 | 62 | 6 |
| 7 | Tim Veldt (NED) | 4:22.856 | 28 | 38 | 10 |
| 8 | Bobby Lea (USA) | 4:23.942 | 26 | 34 | 13 |
| 9 | Gideoni Monteiro (BRA) | 4:25.808 | 24 | 38 | 10 |
| 10 | Fernando Gaviria (COL) | 4:26.649 | 22 | 48 | 8 |
| 11 | Glenn O'Shea (AUS) | 4:28.350 | 20 | 54 | 7 |
| 12 | Park Sang-hoon (KOR) | 4:29.079 | 18 | 42 | 9 |
| 13 | Leung Chun Wing (HKG) | 4:29.162 | 16 | 36 | 12 |
| 14 | Ignacio Prado (MEX) | 4:29.396 | 14 | 30 | 15 |
| 15 | Artyom Zakharov (KAZ) | 4:32.503 | 12 | 34 | 13 |
| 16 | Jasper De Buyst (BEL) | 4:36.246 | 10 | 16 | 18 |
| 17 | Gaël Suter (SUI) | 4:36.674 | 8 | 20 | 17 |
| 18 | Kazushige Kuboki (JPN) | 4:39.889 | 6 | 24 | 16 |

=== Elimination race ===
| Rank | Rider | Points | Overall | Overall rank |
|---|---|---|---|---|
| 1 | Elia Viviani (ITA) | 40 | 104 | 2 |
| 2 | Thomas Boudat (FRA) | 38 | 106 | 1 |
| 3 | Fernando Gaviria (COL) | 36 | 84 | 6 |
| 4 | Kazushige Kuboki (JPN) | 34 | 58 | 11 |
| 5 | Artyom Zakharov (KAZ) | 32 | 66 | 10 |
| 6 | Gideoni Monteiro (BRA) | 30 | 68 | 9 |
| 7 | Mark Cavendish (GBR) | 28 | 96 | 3 |
| 8 | Gaël Suter (SUI) | 26 | 46 | 17 |
| 9 | Ignacio Prado (MEX) | 24 | 54 | 13 |
| 10 | Glenn O'Shea (AUS) | 22 | 76 | 7 |
| 11 | Bobby Lea (USA) | 20 | 54 | 13 |
| 12 | Roger Kluge (GER) | 18 | 90 | 4 |
| 13 | Leung Chun Wing (HKG) | 16 | 52 | 15 |
| 14 | Park Sang-hoon (KOR) | 14 | 56 | 12 |
| 15 | Jasper De Buyst (BEL) | 12 | 28 | 18 |
| 16 | Tim Veldt (NED) | 10 | 48 | 16 |
| 17 | Dylan Kennett (NZL) | 8 | 70 | 8 |
| 18 | Lasse Norman Hansen (DEN) | 6 | 86 | 5 |

=== Time trial ===
| Rank | Rider | Time | Points | Overall | Overall rank |
|---|---|---|---|---|---|
| 1 | Dylan Kennett (NZL) | 1:00.923 | 40 | 110 | 8 |
| 2 | Glenn O'Shea (AUS) | 1:02.332 | 38 | 114 | 6 |
| 3 | Elia Viviani (ITA) | 1:02.338 | 36 | 140 | 1 |
| 4 | Fernando Gaviria (COL) | 1:02.469 | 34 | 118 | 4 |
| 5 | Lasse Norman Hansen (DEN) | 1:02.538 | 32 | 118 | 4 |
| 6 | Mark Cavendish (GBR) | 1:02.868 | 30 | 126 | 2 |
| 7 | Tim Veldt (NED) | 1:03.464 | 28 | 76 | 12 |
| 8 | Leung Chun Wing (HKG) | 1:03.730 | 26 | 78 | 10 |
| 9 | Roger Kluge (GER) | 1:03.797 | 24 | 114 | 6 |
| 10 | Artyom Zakharov (KAZ) | 1:03.941 | 22 | 88 | 9 |
| 11 | Thomas Boudat (FRA) | 1:04.227 | 20 | 126 | 2 |
| 12 | Park Sang-hoon (KOR) | 1:04.231 | 18 | 74 | 13 |
| 13 | Gaël Suter (SUI) | 1:04.433 | 16 | 62 | 16 |
| 14 | Bobby Lea (USA) | 1:05.339 | 14 | 68 | 15 |
| 15 | Kazushige Kuboki (JPN) | 1:05.498 | 12 | 70 | 14 |
| 16 | Gideoni Monteiro (BRA) | 1:05.505 | 10 | 78 | 10 |
| 17 | Ignacio Prado (MEX) | 1:05.839 | 8 | 62 | 16 |
| 18 | Jasper De Buyst (BEL) | DNS | – | 28 | 18 |

=== Flying lap ===
| Rank | Rider | Time | Points | Overall | Overall rank |
|---|---|---|---|---|---|
| 1 | Dylan Kennett (NZL) | 12.506 | 40 | 150 | 4 |
| 2 | Elia Viviani (ITA) | 12.660 | 38 | 178 | 1 |
| 3 | Mark Cavendish (GBR) | 12.793 | 36 | 162 | 2 |
| 4 | Lasse Norman Hansen (DEN) | 12.832 | 34 | 152 | 3 |
| 5 | Gaël Suter (SUI) | 12.981 | 32 | 94 | 12 |
| 6 | Glenn O'Shea (AUS) | 13.053 | 30 | 144 | 6 |
| 7 | Tim Veldt (NED) | 13.170 | 28 | 104 | 10 |
| 8 | Leung Chun Wing (HKG) | 13.265 | 26 | 104 | 11 |
| 9 | Thomas Boudat (FRA) | 13.272 | 24 | 150 | 5 |
| 10 | Fernando Gaviria (COL) | 13.273 | 22 | 140 | 7 |
| 11 | Roger Kluge (GER) | 13.332 | 20 | 134 | 8 |
| 12 | Bobby Lea (USA) | 13.416 | 18 | 86 | 15 |
| 13 | Artyom Zakharov (KAZ) | 13.446 | 16 | 104 | 9 |
| 14 | Park Sang-hoon (KOR) | 13.489 | 14 | 88 | 14 |
| 15 | Gideoni Monteiro (BRA) | 13.569 | 12 | 90 | 13 |
| 16 | Kazushige Kuboki (JPN) | 13.587 | 10 | 80 | 16 |
| 17 | Ignacio Prado (MEX) | 14.046 | 8 | 70 | 17 |

=== Points race ===
| Rank | Rider | Points | Overall | Overall rank |
|---|---|---|---|---|
| 1 | Fernando Gaviria (COL) | 41 | 181 | 4 |
| 2 | Lasse Norman Hansen (DEN) | 40 | 192 | 3 |
| 3 | Roger Kluge (GER) | 33 | 167 | 6 |
| 4 | Mark Cavendish (GBR) | 32 | 194 | 2 |
| 5 | Elia Viviani (ITA) | 29 | 207 | 1 |
| 6 | Thomas Boudat (FRA) | 22 | 172 | 5 |
| 7 | Tim Veldt (NED) | 7 | 111 | 9 |
| 8 | Artyom Zakharov (KAZ) | 7 | 111 | 10 |
| 9 | Gideoni Monteiro (BRA) | 4 | 94 | 13 |
| 10 | Ignacio Prado (MEX) | 3 | 73 | 15 |
| 11 | Leung Chun Wing (HKG) | 1 | 105 | 11 |
| 12 | Kazushige Kuboki (JPN) | 1 | 81 | 14 |
| 13 | Gaël Suter (SUI) | 1 | 95 | 12 |
| 14 | Glenn O'Shea (AUS) | 0 | 144 | 7 |
| 15 | Dylan Kennett (NZL) | –7 | 143 | 8 |
| 16 | Park Sang-hoon (KOR) | DNF | 88 | DNF |
| 17 | Bobby Lea (USA) | DNF | 86 | DNF |
