= 2014 UCI Track Cycling World Championships – Men's points race =

The Men's points race at the 2014 UCI Track Cycling World Championships was held on 28 February 2014. 20 cyclists participated in the contest, which was contested over 160 laps, equating to a distance of 40 km (24.9 mi).

== Medalists ==
Gold	Edwin Ávila (COL)
Silver	Thomas Scully (NZL)
Bronze	Eloy Teruel (ESP)

== Results ==
The final was started at 20:25.

Rank	Name	Nation	Sprint points	Lap points	Total points
1st place, gold medalist(s)	Edwin Ávila	Colombia	10	60	70
2nd place, silver medalist(s)	Thomas Scully	New Zealand	26	40	66
3rd place, bronze medalist(s)	Eloy Teruel	Spain	18	40	58
4	Andreas Graf	Austria	10	40	50
5	Cheung King Lok	Hong Kong	21	20	41
6	Martyn Irvine	Ireland	15	20	35
7	Theo Reinhardt	Germany	14	20	34
8	Ivan Savitcki	Russia	13	20	33
9	Théry Schir	Switzerland	6	20	26
10	Glenn O'Shea	Australia	4	20	24
11	Milan Kadlec	Czech Republic	3	20	23
12	Kenny De Ketele	Belgium	11	0	11
13	Elia Viviani	Italy	7	0	7
14	Roman Lutsyshyn	Ukraine	4	0	0
15	Vivien Brisse	France	3	0	3
16	Anton Muzychkin	Belarus	0	0	0
17	Owain Doull	Great Britain	0	0	0
–	Lasse Norman Hansen	Denmark	11	0	DNF
–	Ivan Carbajal	Mexico	0	−20	DNF
–	Nolan Hoffman	South Africa	0	0	DNF
