= Cycling at the 2020 Summer Olympics – Men's Madison =

Olympic cycling event

Men's Madison at the Games of the XXXII Olympiad
- Olympic track cycling
- Venues: Izu Velodrome
- Date: 7 August 2021
- Competitors: 32 from 16 nations
- Teams: 16
- Winning points: 43

Medalists
1st place, gold medalist(s)		Lasse Norman Hansen; Michael Mørkøv	Denmark
2nd place, silver medalist(s)		Ethan Hayter; Matthew Walls	Great Britain
3rd place, bronze medalist(s)		Benjamin Thomas; Donavan Grondin	France

The men's madison event at the 2020 Summer Olympics took place on 7 August 2021 at the Izu Velodrome. 32 cyclists (16 teams of 2) from 16 nations competed.

== Background ==
This was the 4th appearance of the event. It was held from 2000 to 2008, then dropped for 2012 and 2016 due to there being no women's equivalent. The event was returning in 2020 with a new women's counterpart.

The reigning (2008) Olympic champions were Juan Curuchet and Walter Pérez of Argentina. The reigning (2020) World Champions were Lasse Norman Hansen and Michael Mørkøv of Denmark.

Russia, Germany, China, Great Britain, Australia, and the Netherlands are traditionally strong track cycling nations.

== Qualification ==
A National Olympic Committee (NOC) could enter up to 1 team of 2 cyclists in the madison. Quota places are allocated to the NOC, which selects the cyclists. Qualification is entirely through the 2018–20 UCI nation rankings. The 8 top nations in the team pursuit rankings automatically qualified a team in the Madison. The best 8 NOCs in the madison rankings (not already qualified through the team pursuit) also qualified to enter madison teams. The NOCs qualifying directly in the madison also earned 1 spot in the omnium. Because qualification was complete by the end of the 2020 UCI Track Cycling World Championships on 1 March 2020 (the last event that contributed to the 2018–20 rankings), qualification was unaffected by the COVID-19 pandemic.

== Competition format ==
A madison race is a tag team points race that involves all 16 teams competing at once. One cyclist from each team competes at a time; the two team members can swap at any time by touching (including pushing and hand-slinging). The distance is 200 laps (50 km). Teams score points in two ways: lapping the field and sprints. A team that gains a lap on the field earns 20 points; one that loses a lap has 20 points deducted. Every 10th lap is a sprint, with the first to finish the lap earning 5 points, second 3 points, third 2 points, and fourth 1 point. The points values are doubled for the final sprint. There is only one round of competition.

== Schedule ==
All times are Japan Standard Time (UTC+9)

Date	Time	Round
7 August 2021	16:55	Final

== Results ==
All three medalists were separated by only three points, and no team able to take a lap in the entire race. Although they won only 3 of the sprints, Denmark's Lasse Norman Hansen and Michael Mørkøv had, with consistent points finishes, sewn up the gold medal before the final sprint for ten points. This left the final sprint between the British pair of Ethan Hayter and Matthew Walls and the French duo of Benjamin Thomas and Donavan Grondin. The British pair held off all challengers to win silver, claiming the ten points for the final sprint, bringing them level with France on 40 points, but leaving the French with the bronze medal based on finishing position in the final sprint.

Rank	Cyclist	Nation	Sprint																				Laps		Finish order	Total
Rank	Cyclist	Nation	1	2	3	4	5	6	7	8	9	10	11	12	13	14	15	16	17	18	19	20	+	−	Finish order	Total
1st place, gold medalist(s)	Lasse Norman Hansen; Michael Mørkøv	Denmark		3		3		5	3			5	3	3	2	1	5	3		3	2	2			4	43
2nd place, silver medalist(s)	Ethan Hayter; Matthew Walls	Great Britain	3	2	5		3	2			3	2	2	1	1		2			1	3	10			1	40
3rd place, bronze medalist(s)	Benjamin Thomas; Donavan Grondin	France	5	5			1			3			5	5	5	3		1	2		1	4			3	40
4	Kenny De Ketele; Robbe Ghys	Belgium				1	5			5					3	2				5	5	6			2	32
5	Yoeri Havik; Jan-Willem van Schip	Netherlands	2			5	2	1		2	1	1		2			1								6	17
6	Sebastián Mora; Albert Torres	Spain			2				1		2							2	5	2					5	14
7	Robin Froidevaux; Théry Schir	Switzerland							2				1					5							7	8
8	Szymon Sajnok; Daniel Staniszewski	Poland																							10	0
9	Roger Kluge; Theo Reinhardt	Germany				2		3		1						5	3							20	9	–6
10	Simone Consonni; Elia Viviani	Italy	1	1					5			3							1					20	11	–9
11	Campbell Stewart; Corbin Strong	New Zealand																	3					20	8	–17
12	Kelland O'Brien; Leigh Howard	Australia			3																			20	DNF	–
12	Adrian Hegyvary; Gavin Hoover	United States			1						5														DNF	–
12	Andreas Graf; Andreas Müller	Austria																						20	DNF	–
12	Mark Downey; Felix English	Ireland																						40	DNF	–
12	Michael Foley; Derek Gee	Canada																						20	DNF	–
