= 2020 UCI Track Cycling World Championships – Men's madison =

Men's madison at the 2020 UCI Track Cycling World Championships
- Venue: Velodrom
- Location: Berlin, Germany
- Dates: 1 March
- Competitors: 34 from 17 nations
- Teams: 17
- Winning points: 62

Medalists
gold medal	Lasse Norman Hansen; Michael Mørkøv	Denmark
silver medal	Campbell Stewart; Aaron Gate	New Zealand
bronze medal	Roger Kluge; Theo Reinhardt	Germany

The Men's madison competition at the 2020 UCI Track Cycling World Championships was held on 1 March 2020.

== Results ==
The race was started at 15:03. 200 laps (50 km) with 20 sprints were raced.

Rank	Nation	Athletes	Laps points	Sprint points	Total points
1st place, gold medalist(s)	Denmark	Lasse Norman Hansen; Michael Mørkøv	20	42	62
2nd place, silver medalist(s)	New Zealand	Campbell Stewart; Aaron Gate	0	33	33
3rd place, bronze medalist(s)	Germany	Roger Kluge; Theo Reinhardt	0	32	32
4	Netherlands	Jan-Willem van Schip; Yoeri Havik	0	29	29
5	Belgium	Kenny De Ketele; Robbe Ghys	0	23	23
6	France	Benjamin Thomas; Donavan Grondin	0	14	14
7	Italy	Elia Viviani; Simone Consonni	0	11	11
8	Switzerland	Théry Schir; Robin Froidevaux	0	9	9
9	Great Britain	Ethan Hayter; Oliver Wood	0	9	9
10	Spain	Sebastián Mora; Albert Torres	0	5	5
11	Ireland	Mark Downey; Felix English	0	3	3
12	Poland	Daniel Staniszewski; Wojciech Pszczolarski	0	2	2
13	Austria	Andreas Graf; Andreas Müller	−20	5	−15
14	Portugal	Iúri Leitão; Ivo Oliveira	−20	3	−17
15	Australia	Cameron Meyer; Sam Welsford	−40	7	−33
	United States	Daniel Holloway; Adrian Hegyvary	−20	Did not finish	
	Hong Kong	Cheung King Lok; Leung Chun Wing	−20	Did not finish	
	Belarus	Raman Tsishkou; Yauheni Karaliok	Did not start		
