= 2011 European Track Championships – Men's team pursuit =

UEC European Champion jersey

The Men's team pursuit was held on 21 October 2011 with 13 teams participating.

== Medalists ==
Gold	Great Britain; Steven Burke; Ed Clancy; Peter Kennaugh; Andy Tennant
Silver	Denmark; Michael Mørkøv; Casper Folsach; Lasse Norman Hansen; Rasmus Quaade
Bronze	Russia; Valery Kaykov; Evgeny Kovalev; Ivan Kovalev; Victor Manakov

== Results ==
=== Qualifying ===
Fastest 2 teams race for gold and 3rd and 4th teams race for bronze. It was held at 14:10.

Rank	Name	Nation	Time	Notes
1	Steven Burke; Ed Clancy; Peter Kennaugh; Geraint Thomas	Great Britain	4:01.475	Q
2	Michael Mørkøv; Casper Folsach; Lasse Hansen; Rasmus Quaade	Denmark	4:05.018	Q
3	Sebastián Mora; David Muntaner; Eloy Teruel; Albert Torres	Spain	4:06.644	q
4	Valery Kaykov; Ivan Kovalev; Evgeny Kovalev; Victor Manakov	Russia	4:07.170	q
5	Levi Heimans; Jenning Huizenga; Tim Veldt; Arno van der Zwet	Netherlands	4:07.932	
6	Oleksandr Lobov; Maksym Polishchuk; Vitaliy Popkov; Vitaliy Shchedov	Ukraine	4:09.787	
7	Dominique Cornu; Moreno De Pauw; Ingmar De Poortere; Gijs Van Hoecke	Belgium	4:10.122	
8	Nikias Arndt; Henning Bommel; Stefan Schäfer; Jakob Steigmiller	Germany	4:11.198	
9	Vivien Brisse; Julien Duval; Julien Morice; Laurent Pichon	France	4:11.438	
10	Pawel Brylowski; Dawid Głowacki; Mateusz Nowaczek; Mateusz Nowak	Poland	4:11.679	
11	Jiří Bareš; Jan Kaduch; Alois Kaňkovský; Ondřej Vendolský	Czech Republic	4:12.296	
12	Cyrille Thièry; Silvan Dillier; Claudio Imhof; Loïc Perizzolo	Switzerland	4:12.591	
13	Omar Bertazzo; Alessandro De Marchi; Giairo Ermeti; Elia Viviani	Italy	4:15.356	

=== Finals ===
The final was held at 20:15.

Rank	Name	Nation	Time
Gold Medal Race
1st place, gold medalist(s)	Steven Burke; Ed Clancy; Peter Kennaugh; Geraint Thomas	Great Britain	4:00.008
2nd place, silver medalist(s)	Michael Mørkøv; Casper Folsach; Lasse Hansen; Rasmus Quaade	Denmark	4:06.787
Bronze Medal Race
3rd place, bronze medalist(s)	Valery Kaykov; Ivan Kovalev; Evgeny Kovalev; Victor Manakov	Russia	4:04.508
4	Sebastián Mora; David Muntaner; Eloy Teruel; Albert Torres	Spain	4:10.153
