= 2019 UCI Track Cycling World Championships – Men's madison =

Men's madison at the 2019 UCI Track Cycling World Championships
- Venue: BGŻ Arena
- Location: Pruszków, Poland
- Dates: 3 March
- Competitors: 36 from 18 nations
- Teams: 18
- Winning points: 105

Medalists
gold medal	Roger Kluge; Theo Reinhardt	Germany
silver medal	Lasse Norman Hansen; Casper von Folsach	Denmark
bronze medal	Kenny De Ketele; Robbe Ghys	Belgium

The Men's madison competition at the 2019 UCI Track Cycling World Championships was held on 3 March 2019.

== Results ==
The race was started at 14:59. 200 laps (50 km) with 20 sprints were raced.

Rank	Nation	Athletes	Laps points	Sprint points	Total points
1st place, gold medalist(s)	Germany	Roger Kluge; Theo Reinhardt	60	45	105
2nd place, silver medalist(s)	Denmark	Lasse Norman Hansen; Casper von Folsach	60	24	84
3rd place, bronze medalist(s)	Belgium	Kenny De Ketele; Robbe Ghys	60	22	82
4	Australia	Leigh Howard; Cameron Meyer	40	31	71
5	Spain	Albert Torres; Sebastián Mora	20	20	40
6	France	Benjamin Thomas; Bryan Coquard	20	12	32
7	Great Britain	Ethan Hayter; Oliver Wood	20	11	31
8	Poland	Wojciech Pszczolarski; Daniel Staniszewski	20	11	31
9	Italy	Simone Consonni; Michele Scartezzini	0	17	17
10	Switzerland	Robin Froidevaux; Nico Selenati	0	14	14
11	Ireland	Mark Downey; Felix English	0	7	7
12	Austria	Andreas Graf; Andreas Müller	0	6	6
13	Belarus	Raman Tsishkou; Yauheni Karaliok	0	3	3
14	Hong Kong	Cheung King Lok; Leung Chun Wing	0	2	2
15	United States	Daniel Holloway; Adrian Hegyvary	0	2	2
16	Russia	Artur Ershov; Viktor Manakov	−40	1	−39
17	Portugal	Ivo Oliveira; Rui Oliveira	−60	3	−57
	South Korea	Park Sang-hoon; Im Jae-yeon	−60	Did not finish	
