= Michael Mørkøv =

Danish racing cyclist (born 1985)

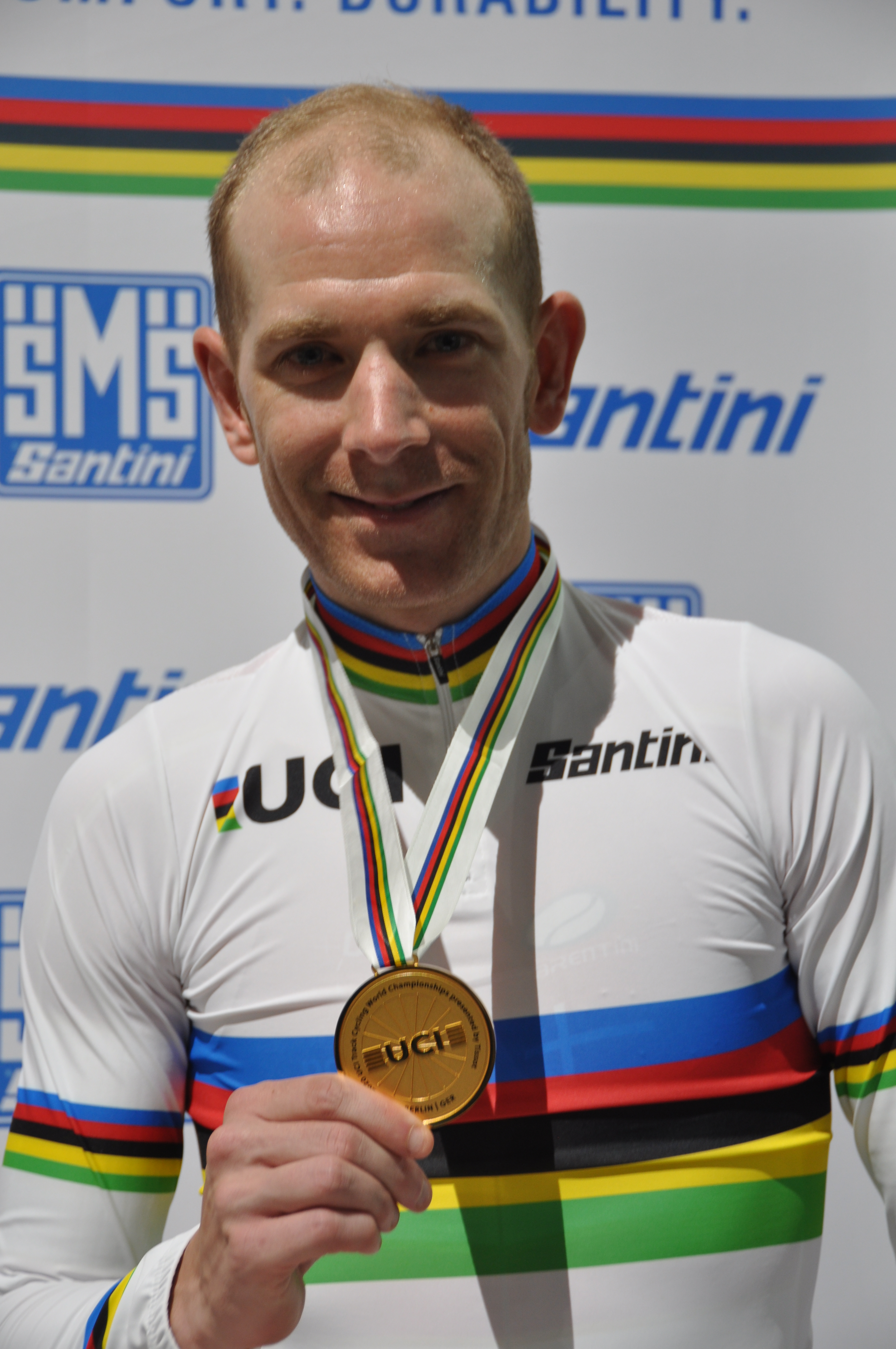
- Mørkøv in 2020

Personal information
- Full name: Michael Mørkøv Christensen
- Born: 30 April 1985 (age 41) Kokkedal, Denmark
- Height: 1.83 m (6 ft 0 in)
- Weight: 71 kg (157 lb)

Cycling career
- Sport: Cycling
- Current team: Retired
- Disciplines: Road; Track
- Role: Rider
- Rider type: Lead out man

Amateur teams
- 1996–2003: Lyngby Cycle Club
- 2004: Team Bornholm

Professional teams
- 2005–2008: Team GLS
- 2009–2015: Team Saxo Bank
- 2016–2017: Team Katusha
- 2018–2023: Quick-Step Floors
- 2024: Astana Qazaqstan Team

Major wins
- Road Grand Tours Vuelta a España 1 individual stage (2013) One-day races and Classics National Road Race Championships (2013, 2018, 2019) Track Olympic Games Madison (2020) World Championships Madison (2009, 2020, 2021) Team pursuit (2009)
Medal record
Men's track cycling
Representing Denmark
Olympic Games
Gold medal – first place	2020 Tokyo	Madison
Silver medal – second place	2008 Beijing	Team pursuit
Bronze medal – third place	2024 Paris	Madison
World Championships
Gold medal – first place	2009 Pruszków	Madison
Gold medal – first place	2009 Pruszków	Team pursuit
Gold medal – first place	2020 Berlin	Madison
Gold medal – first place	2021 Roubaix	Madison
Bronze medal – third place	2007 Palma de Mallorca	Team pursuit
Bronze medal – third place	2008 Manchester	Madison
Bronze medal – third place	2024 Ballerup	Madison
European Championships
Gold medal – first place	2019 Apeldoorn	Madison
Silver medal – second place	2011 Apeldoorn	Team pursuit
Bronze medal – third place	2024 Apeldoorn	Madison

Michael Mørkøv Christensen (Danish pronunciation: [ˈmiˌkʰɛˀl ˈmɶɐ̯kʰøw]; born 30 April 1985) is a Danish former racing cyclist, who competed as a professional from 2005 to 2024. He is the brother of racing cyclists Jacob and Jesper Mørkøv.

After retiring he became the national coach of Denmark.

== Career ==
Born in Kokkedal, Mørkøv started as a track cyclist, becoming national champion in the points race in 2004. In the 2008 Olympic games, he won the silver medal in the team pursuit.

As a road cyclist, Mørkøv became national time trial champion in 2005. Mørkøv rode the 2010 and 2011 Giro d'Italia, finishing both. Mørkøv rode his first Tour de France in 2012, drawing attention by featuring in the most important escapes of the first three stages, where he gained enough points to lead the mountains classification. He held polka-dot jersey until stage 7, where stage winner Chris Froome took it.

In 2013, he won Stage 6 in the Vuelta a España.

In August 2015, it was announced that Mørkøv would join Team Katusha for the 2016 season, at the request of Alexander Kristoff, with a view to working for Kristoff as part of his sprint train and as a domestique in the classics.

Mørkøv joined the Belgian Quick Step team in 2018 and since then acted as a successful lead-out man for Sam Bennett and then, as a late replacement for Bennett as the team's sprinter for the 2021 Tour de France, Mark Cavendish. Mørkøv has been highly praised; Cavendish said "It’s a known fact Michael is the best leadout man in the world" and retired sprinter Marcel Kittel said "Many sprinters would win with him as the last man on the sprint train".

In 2021, when the Madison track race was reinstated into the Olympic Games of Tokyo 2020, Mørkøv won the gold medal (partnered with Lasse Norman Hansen).

== Major results ==
=== Road ===
2004
3rd Speditørløbet
2005
1st Team time trial, National Championships
2006
1st Post Cuppen Skive
2nd Team time trial, National Championships
4th Rund um den Elm
2007
2nd Ronde Van Vlaanderen Beloften
2008
1st Midt Data Løbet
1st Team time trial, National Championships
1st Stage 2 Giro del Capo
2nd Speditørløbet
2nd Duo Normand
9th GP Nordjylland
2009
7th Châteauroux Classic
2010
1st Herlev-løbet
3rd Time trial, National Championships
4th Overall Tour du Limousin
2011
1st Fyen Rundt
3rd Overall Danmark Rundt
8th GP Herning
10th Himmerland Rundt
2012
3rd Time trial, National Championships
4th Overall Post Cuppen

1st Roskilde
1st Ringsted

Tour de France

Held after Stages 1–6
Combativity award Stage 3 & 13

2013 (2 pro wins)
1st Road race, National Championships
1st Stage 6 Vuelta a España
2nd Paris–Tours
4th Overall Tour de l'Eurométropole
2014
3rd Road race, National Championships
3rd Overall Tour de Luxembourg
5th Overall Tour of Qatar
2015 (1)
1st Stage 6 Danmark Rundt
2016
10th Gent–Wevelgem
2018 (1)
1st Road race, National Championships
2nd Fyen Rundt
2019 (1)
1st Road race, National Championships
3rd London–Surrey Classic
5th Road race, UEC European Championships
7th Cadel Evans Great Ocean Road Race
2020
3rd Road race, National Championships
5th Race Torquay
2021
5th Elfstedenronde
8th Classic Brugge–De Panne
2022
7th Milano–Torino
2023
9th Elfstedenronde

==== Grand Tour general classification results timeline ====
Grand Tour	2010	2011	2012	2013	2014	2015	2016	2017	2018	2019	2020	2021	2022	2023	2024
Giro d'Italia	129	156	—	—	—	—	—	—	107	—	—	—	DNF	—	—
Tour de France	—	—	93	—	134	—	DNF	—	—	152	130	138	DNF	150	DNF
Vuelta a España	—	—	—	128	—	—	—	137	148	—	121	—	—	—	—

Legend
—	Did not compete
DNF	Did not finish

=== Track ===
2001
3rd Team pursuit, National Junior Championships
2002
National Junior Championships

2nd Individual pursuit
2nd Team pursuit

2003
National Junior Championships

1st Points race
2nd Team pursuit

2nd Team pursuit, National Championships
2004
National Championships

1st Points race
2nd Team pursuit

3rd UIV Cup München
2005
1st Madison, UEC European Under-23 Championships (with Alex Rasmussen)
1st Overall UIV Cup

1st Stuttgart
1st Berlin
1st Amsterdam
2nd Copenhagen
3rd Bremen

2nd Madison, UCI World Cup, Sydney (with Alex Rasmussen)
2nd Madison, National Championships (with Marc Hester)
2006
National Championships

1st Madison (with Alex Rasmussen)
1st Points race
3rd Team pursuit
3rd Scratch

UCI World Cup

1st Madison, Sydney (with Alex Rasmussen)
1st Team pursuit, Sydney
2nd Madison, Sydney (with Alex Rasmussen)
2nd Team pursuit, Sydney
3rd Madison, Moscow (with Alex Rasmussen)

1st Omnium, Danmarksturneringen i Banecykling
2nd Six Days of Grenoble (with Alex Rasmussen)
3rd Points race, UEC European Under-23 Championships
2007
National Championships

1st Madison (with Alex Rasmussen)
2nd Points race
3rd Team pursuit

UCI World Cup

1st Madison, Los Angeles (with Alex Rasmussen)
2nd Team pursuit Los Angeles
3rd Madison, Sydney (with Alex Rasmussen)

1st Six Days of Grenoble (with Alex Rasmussen)
3rd Team pursuit, UCI World Championships
3rd Six Days of Zürich (with Danny Stam)
2008
National Championships

1st Madison (with Alex Rasmussen)
1st Team pursuit
1st Scratch
1st Points race

UCI World Cup

1st Madison, Copenhagen (with Alex Rasmussen)
2nd Madison, Los Angeles (with Alex Rasmussen)
2nd Team pursuit, Copenhagen
2nd Team pursuit, Los Angeles

2nd Team pursuit, Olympic Games
2nd Six Days of Copenhagen (with Alex Rasmussen)
3rd Madison, UCI World Championships (with Alex Rasmussen)
2009
1st Madison, UCI World Championships (with Alex Rasmussen)
1st Madison, National Championships (with Alex Rasmussen)
1st Six Days of Copenhagen (with Alex Rasmussen)
1st Six Days of Ghent (with Alex Rasmussen)
2nd Six Days of Munich (with Alex Rasmussen)
2010
1st Madison, National Championships (with Alex Rasmussen)
1st Six Days of Berlin (with Alex Rasmussen)
1st Six Days of Copenhagen (with Alex Rasmussen)
3rd Six Days of Rotterdam (with Alex Rasmussen)
3rd Six Days of Ghent (with Alex Rasmussen)
2011
National Championships

1st Madison (with Alex Rasmussen)
1st Omnium

1st Six Days of Copenhagen (with Alex Rasmussen)
2nd Team pursuit, UEC European Championships
3rd Six Days of Berlin (with Alex Rasmussen)
2012
1st Six Days of Amsterdam (with Pim Ligthart)
2nd Six Days of Copenhagen (with Alex Rasmussen)
2013
1st Six Days of Copenhagen (with Lasse Norman Hansen)
2014
2nd Six Days of Copenhagen (with Alex Rasmussen)
3rd Six Days of Rotterdam (with Alex Rasmussen)
2015
1st Six Days of Ghent (with Iljo Keisse)
1st Six Days of Copenhagen (with Alex Rasmussen)
2nd Six Days of Rotterdam (with Alex Rasmussen)
2017
1st Six Days of Copenhagen (with Lasse Norman Hansen)
2nd Six Days of Rotterdam (with Lasse Norman Hansen)
2018
1st Six Days of Copenhagen (with Kenny De Ketele)
2019
1st Madison, UEC European Championships (with Lasse Norman Hansen)
2020
1st Madison, UCI World Championships (with Lasse Norman Hansen)
2021
1st Madison, Olympic Games (with Lasse Norman Hansen)
1st Madison, UCI World Championships (with Lasse Norman Hansen)
2024
3rd Madison, Olympic Games (with Niklas Larsen)
3rd Madison, UCI World Championships (with Niklas Larsen)
3rd Madison, UEC European Championships (with Theodor Storm)
