= 2021 UCI Track Cycling World Championships – Men's madison =

Track Cycling World Championship

Men's madison at the 2021 UCI Track Cycling World Championships
- Venue: Vélodrome Couvert Régional Jean Stablinski
- Location: Roubaix, France
- Dates: 24 October
- Competitors: 34 from 17 nations
- Teams: 17

Medalists
gold medal	Lasse Norman Hansen; Michael Mørkøv	Denmark
silver medal	Simone Consonni; Michele Scartezzini	Italy
bronze medal	Kenny De Ketele; Robbe Ghys	Belgium

The Men's madison competition at the 2021 UCI Track Cycling World Championships was held on 24 October 2021.

== Results ==
The race was started at 14:57. 200 laps (50 km) with 20 sprints were raced.

Rank	Riders	Nation	Laps points	Sprint points	Total points
1st place, gold medalist(s)	Lasse Norman Hansen; Michael Mørkøv	Denmark	20	48	68
2nd place, silver medalist(s)	Simone Consonni; Michele Scartezzini	Italy	40	24	64
3rd place, bronze medalist(s)	Kenny De Ketele; Robbe Ghys	Belgium	20	42	62
4	Ethan Hayter; Oliver Wood	Great Britain	20	38	58
5	Morgan Kneisky; Benjamin Thomas	France	20	38	58
6	João Matias; Rui Oliveira	Portugal	20	7	27
7	Robin Froidevaux; Lukas Rüegg	Switzerland	0	11	11
9	Aaron Gate; Corbin Strong	New Zealand	0	7	7
8	Kelland O'Brien; Luke Plapp	Australia	0	8	8
10	Lev Gonov; Vlas Shichkin	Russian Cycling Federation	0	6	6
11	Erik Martorell; Illart Zuazubiskar	Spain	−80	0	−80
–	Szymon Sajnok; Daniel Staniszewski	Poland	Did not finish		
–	Denis Rugovac; Daniel Babor	Czech Republic	Did not finish		
–	José Muñiz; Jorge Peyrot	Mexico	Did not finish		
–	Yauheni Karaliok; Aliaksei Shmantsar	Belarus	Did not finish		
–	Maximilian Schmidbauer; Andreas Graf	Austria	Did not finish		
–	Volodymyr Dzhus; Maksym Vasyliev	Ukraine	Did not finish		
