= Volodymyr Kogut =

Ukrainian cyclist (born 1984)

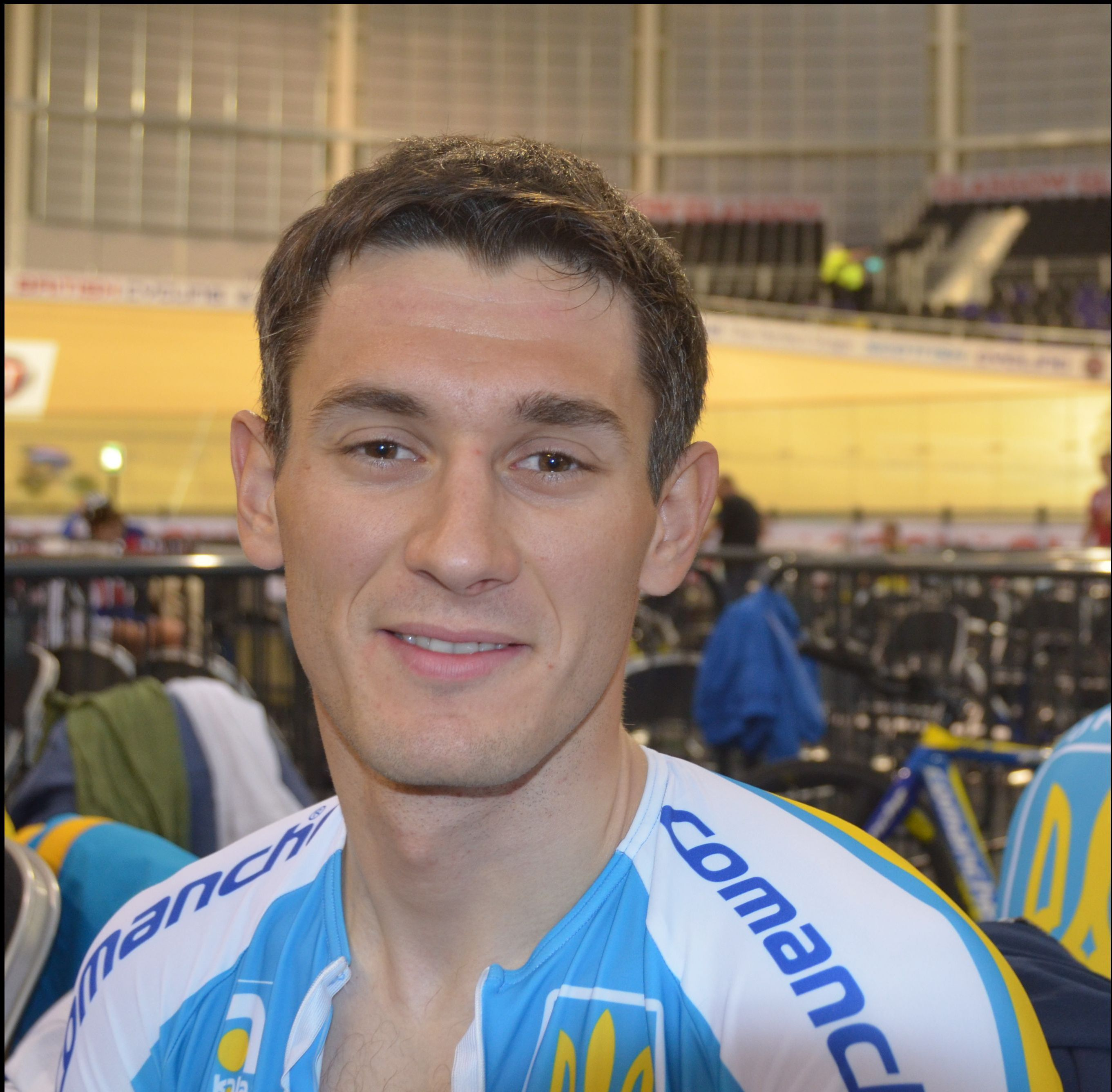
- Kogut in 2012

Personal information
- Full name: Volodymyr Kogut
- Born: 28 July 1984 (age 42) Mykolaiv, Ukraine
- Height: 1.84 m (6 ft 0 in)
- Weight: 73 kg (161 lb)

Cycling career
- Sport: Cycling
- Current team: Retired
- Disciplines: Road, track
- Role: Rider
- Rider type: Endurance (track)

Amateur team
- 2006: Garcamps–Comunidad Valenciana

Professional teams
- 2009: ISD Sport Donetsk
- 2010–2011: Amore & Vita–Conad
- 2014–2016: Amore & Vita–Selle SMP
- 2017: Kolss Cycling Team

Volodymyr Kogut (born 28 July 1984) is a Ukrainian former road and track cyclist. He competed in the team pursuit event and omnium event at the 2013 UCI Track Cycling World Championships.

== Major results ==
2014
3rd National Time Trial Championships
9th Race Horizon Park 1
2016
1st National Team Pursuit Championships
