= Erik Mohs =

German cyclist (born 1986)

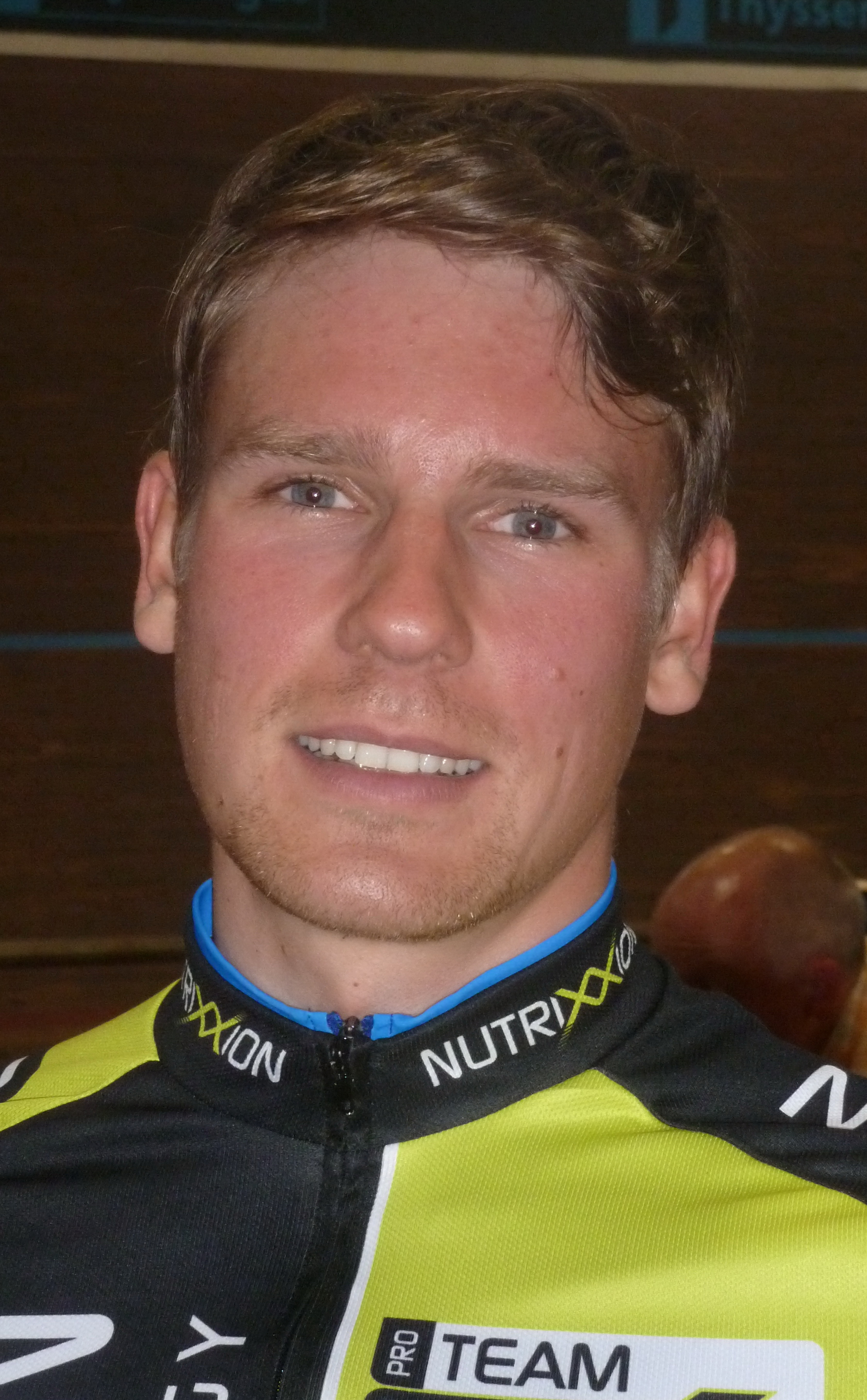

Personal information
- Full name: Erik Mohs
- Born: 12 October 1986 (age 40) Leipzig, East Germany

Cycling career
- Sport: Cycling
- Disciplines: Road and track
- Role: Rider

Professional teams
- 2007–2008: Milram Continental Team
- 2009–2011: Nutrixxion-Sparkasse

Erik Mohs (born 12 October 1986, in Leipzig) is a German professional racing cyclist.

== Career highlights ==
2004
1st, National Championship, Track, Madison, Juniors, Germany, Cottbus
2005
3rd, UIV Cup Dortmund, U23
2nd, UIV Cup Ghent, U23
2006
2nd, UIV Cup Rotterdam, U23
2nd, UIV Cup Bremen, U23
1st, UIV Cup Berlin, U23
1st, UIV Cup København, U23
2nd, General Classification UIV Cup, U23
2nd, Zwenkau-Böhlen
1st, Criterium, Sebnitz
1st, UIV Cup Ghent, U23
2007
1st, Stage 2 GP Cycliste de Gemenc, Pécs
3rd, Purgstall Rundstreckenrennen
3rd, Rund um die Schafshöhe
2nd, Zwenkau-Böhlen
1st, Grosser Silber-Pils Preiss
3rd, Criterium, Osterweddingen
3rd, National Championship, Track, Madison, Elite, Germany, Berlin
1st, Criterium, Zwickau
1st, Criterium, Sebnitz
1st, Stage 3, Tobago International, Milton Road
1st, Stage 5, Tobago International
2nd, General Classification Tobago International
1st, European Championship, Track, Madison, U23, Alkmaar
2008
3rd, Six Days, Stuttgart
