= Carlos Linarez =

Venezuelan track cyclist (born 1991)

Personal information
- Born: 5 September 1991 (age 35)

Cycling career
- Sport: Cycling
- Discipline: Track
- Role: Rider
Medal record
Men's track cycling
Representing Venezuela
Pan American Championships
Silver medal – second place	2011 Medellin	Omnium
Silver medal – second place	2012 Mar del Plata	Omnium
Bronze medal – third place	2012 Mar del Plata	Individual pursuit

Carlos Linarez (born 5 September 1991) is a Venezuelan track cyclist. At the 2012 Summer Olympics, he competed in the men's omnium.

== Major results ==
2010
Central American and Caribbean Games

3rd Omnium
