= Liu Hao (cyclist) =

Chinese cyclist (born 1988)

Personal information
- Full name: Liu Hao
- Born: 7 November 1988 (age 37)

Cycling career
- Sport: Cycling
- Current team: Shenzhen Gineyea–Xidesheng Cycling Team
- Discipline: Road
- Role: Rider

Professional teams
- 2009–2016: Max Success Sports
- 2017: Mitchelton Scott
- 2019–2022: Shenzhen Xidesheng Cycling Team
Medal record
Men's track cycling
Representing China
Asian Championships
Gold medal – first place	2016 Izu	team pursuit

Liu Hao (born 7 November 1988) is a Chinese professional racing cyclist, who currently rides for UCI Continental team Shenzhen Gineyea–Xidesheng Cycling Team. He rode at the 2015 UCI Track Cycling World Championships. He won stage three of the 2013 Tour de Korea. He also rode at the 2014 Asian Games.

== Major results ==
2020
2nd Time trial, National Road Championships
