= 2013 UCI Track Cycling World Championships =

Cycling world championships

- Venue: Minsk, Belarus
- Date: 20–24 February 2013
- Velodrome: Minsk-Arena
- Events: 19

The 2013 UCI Track Cycling World Championships took place in Minsk, Belarus from 20 to 24 February 2013 in the Minsk-Arena. The Championships featured 19 events, the same as 2012.

Great Britain, with five gold medals (four in Olympic events), and nine in total topped the medal table. Australia, Germany, France, the United States and Ireland all enjoyed a successful championships.

Becky James of Great Britain, debuting at this level, won four medals, including two gold, in a single Championships, the first British cyclist to do so. Sarah Hammer of the United States also won two gold medals from two events, as did Stefan Bötticher of Germany and Michael Hepburn of Australia.

Martyn Irvine of Ireland broke a 116-year wait for a male Irish track medal with silver in the individual pursuit, only to return an hour later to take Ireland's first ever track gold medal in the Scratch race. Laura Trott suffered her first major senior track defeat, taking silver in the Omnium behind Hammer, but she retained for a third time her Team Pursuit title with Dani King and debutant and World Junior Road Time Trial champion Elinor Barker.

== Medal summary ==
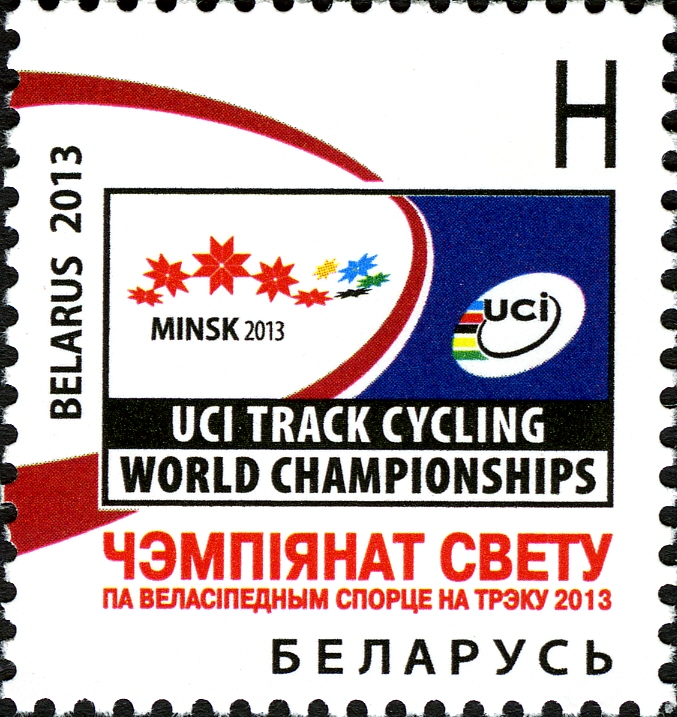
Stamp from Belarus from the event

| Event | Gold | | Silver | | Bronze | |
|---|---|---|---|---|---|---|
Men's events
| Men's sprint | Stefan Bötticher; Germany | | Denis Dmitriev; Russia | | François Pervis; France | |
| Men's 1 km time trial | François Pervis; France | 1:00.221 | Simon van Velthooven; New Zealand | 1:00.869 | Joachim Eilers; Germany | 1:01.450 |
| Men's individual pursuit | Michael Hepburn; Australia | 4:16.733 | Martyn Irvine; Ireland | 4:24.528 | Stefan Küng; Switzerland | 4:22.841 |
| Men's team pursuit | Australia; Glenn O'Shea; Alex Edmondson; Michael Hepburn; Alexander Morgan | 3:56.751 | Great Britain; Steven Burke; Ed Clancy; Sam Harrison; Andrew Tennant | 4:00.967 | Denmark; Lasse Norman Hansen; Casper von Folsach; Mathias Møller; Rasmus Quaade | 3:59.821 |
| Men's team sprint | Germany; René Enders; Stefan Bötticher; Maximilian Levy | 43.495 | New Zealand; Ethan Mitchell; Sam Webster; Eddie Dawkins | 43.544 | France; Julien Palma; François Pervis; Michaël D'Almeida | 43.798 |
| Men's keirin | Jason Kenny; Great Britain | | Maximilian Levy; Germany | | Matthijs Büchli; Netherlands | |
| Men's scratch | Martyn Irvine; Ireland | 17:23.505 | Andreas Müller; Austria | | Luke Davison; Australia | |
| Men's points race | Simon Yates; Great Britain | 35 points | Eloy Teruel; Spain | 34 points | Kirill Sveshnikov; Russia | 30 points |
| Men's madison | France; Vivien Brisse; Morgan Kneisky | 18 points | Spain; David Muntaner; Albert Torres | 15 points | Germany; Henning Bommel; Theo Reinhardt | 13 points |
| Men's omnium | Aaron Gate; New Zealand | 18 points | Lasse Norman Hansen; Denmark | 21 points | Glenn O'Shea; Australia | 22 points |
Women's events
| Women's sprint | Becky James; Great Britain | | Kristina Vogel; Germany | | Lee Wai Sze; Hong Kong | |
| Women's 500 m time trial | Lee Wai Sze; Hong Kong | 33.973 | Miriam Welte; Germany | 33.996 | Becky James; Great Britain | 34.133 |
| Women's individual pursuit | Sarah Hammer; United States | 3:32.050 | Amy Cure; Australia | 3:40.685 | Annette Edmondson; Australia | 3:36.830 |
| Women's team pursuit | Great Britain; Laura Trott; Dani King; Elinor Barker | 3:18.140 | Australia; Annette Edmondson; Amy Cure; Melissa Hoskins | 3:19.913 | Canada; Gillian Carleton; Jasmin Glaesser; Laura Brown | 3:20.704 |
| Women's team sprint | Germany; Kristina Vogel; Miriam Welte | 33.053 | China; Gong Jinjie; Guo Shuang | 33.083 | Great Britain; Becky James; Victoria Williamson | 33.893 |
| Women's keirin | Becky James; Great Britain | | Gong Jinjie; China | | Lisandra Guerra; Cuba | |
| Women's scratch | Katarzyna Pawłowska; Poland | 12:45.016 | Sofía Arreola Navarro; Mexico | | Evgenia Romanyuta; Russia | |
| Women's points race | Jarmila Machačová; Czech Republic | 30 points | Sofía Arreola Navarro; Mexico | 29 points | Giorgia Bronzini; Italy | 22 points |
| Women's omnium | Sarah Hammer; United States | 20 points | Laura Trott; Great Britain | 24 points | Annette Edmondson; Australia | 26 points |

- Shaded events are non-Olympic disciplines.

== Medal table ==
| Rank | Nation | Gold | Silver | Bronze | Total |
|---|---|---|---|---|---|
| 1 | Great Britain (GBR) | 5 | 2 | 2 | 9 |
| 2 | Germany (DEU) | 3 | 3 | 2 | 8 |
| 3 | Australia (AUS) | 2 | 2 | 4 | 8 |
| 4 | France (FRA) | 2 | 0 | 2 | 4 |
| 5 | United States (USA) | 2 | 0 | 0 | 2 |
| 6 | New Zealand (NZL) | 1 | 2 | 0 | 3 |
| 7 | Ireland (IRL) | 1 | 1 | 0 | 2 |
| 8 | Hong Kong (HKG) | 1 | 0 | 1 | 2 |
| 9 | Czech Republic (CZE) | 1 | 0 | 0 | 1 |
| 9 | Poland (POL) | 1 | 0 | 0 | 1 |
| 11 | China (CHN) | 0 | 2 | 0 | 2 |
| 11 | Mexico (MEX) | 0 | 2 | 0 | 2 |
| 11 | Spain (ESP) | 0 | 2 | 0 | 2 |
| 14 | Russia (RUS) | 0 | 1 | 2 | 3 |
| 15 | Denmark (DEN) | 0 | 1 | 1 | 2 |
| 16 | Austria (AUT) | 0 | 1 | 0 | 1 |
| 17 | Canada (CAN) | 0 | 0 | 1 | 1 |
| 17 | Cuba (CUB) | 0 | 0 | 1 | 1 |
| 17 | Italy (ITA) | 0 | 0 | 1 | 1 |
| 17 | Netherlands (NED) | 0 | 0 | 1 | 1 |
| 17 | Switzerland (SUI) | 0 | 0 | 1 | 1 |
| Totals (21 entries) | | 19 | 19 | 19 | 57 |

== See also ==
- 2012–13 UCI Track Cycling World Ranking
- 2012–13 UCI Track Cycling World Cup Classics
