= Robbe Ghys =

Belgian road and track cyclist

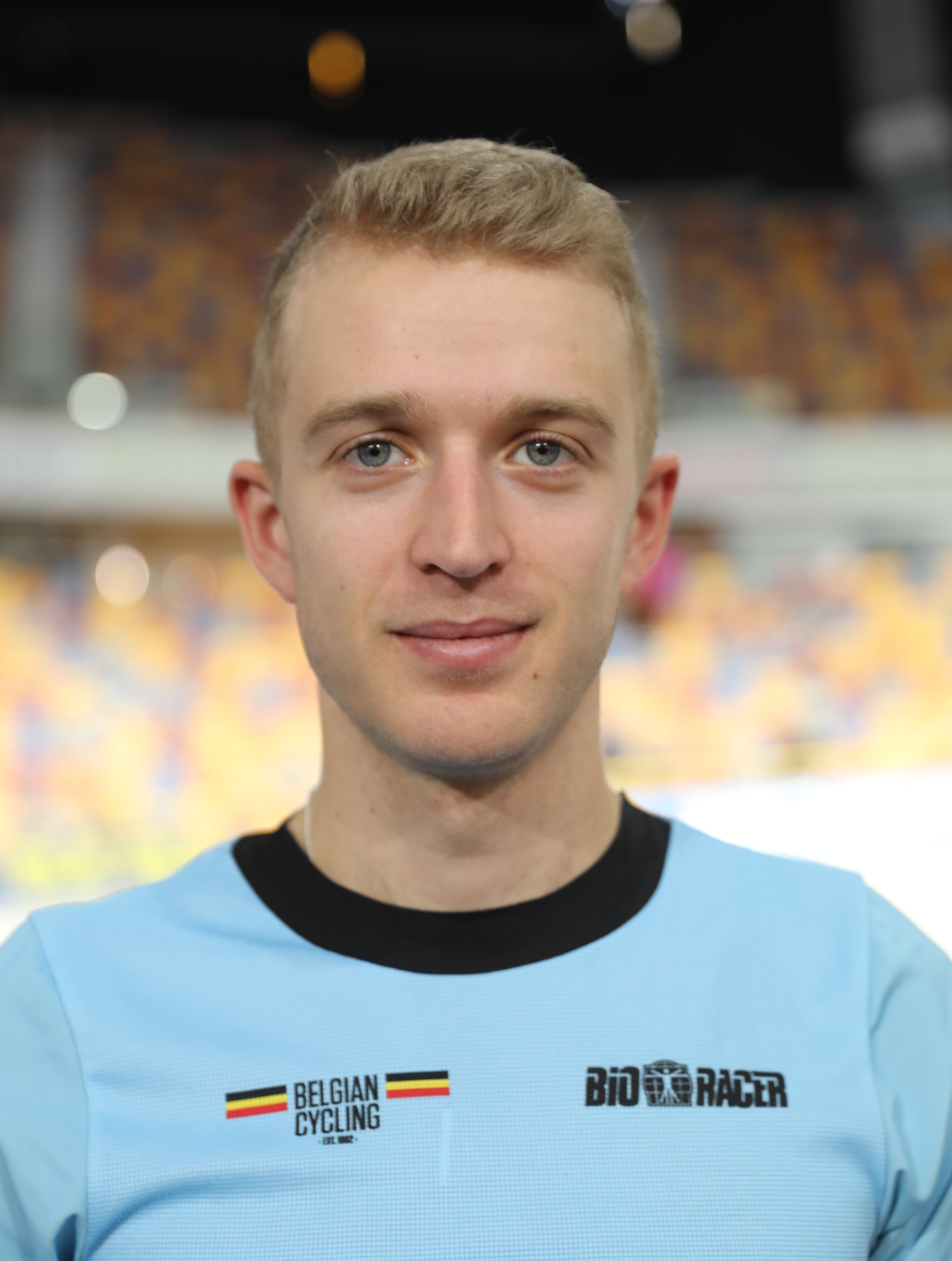
- Ghys in 2024

Personal information
- Born: 11 January 1997 (age 29) Hasselt, Belgium
- Height: 1.82 m (6 ft 0 in)
- Weight: 72 kg (159 lb)

Cycling career
- Sport: Cycling
- Current team: Decathlon CMA CGM
- Disciplines: Road; Track
- Role: Rider

Amateur teams
- 2012–2015: Sport en Moedig Genk
- 2016–2017: Lotto–Soudal U23

Professional teams
- 2018–2022: Sport Vlaanderen–Baloise
- 2023–2025: Alpecin–Deceuninck
- 2026–: Decathlon CMA CGM
Medal record
Men's track cycling
Representing Belgium
World Championships
Bronze medal – third place	2019 Pruszków	Madison
Bronze medal – third place	2021 Roubaix	Madison
European Championships
Gold medal – first place	2018 Glasgow	Madison
Silver medal – second place	2022 Munich	Points race
Bronze medal – third place	2022 Munich	Madison

Robbe Ghys (born 11 January 1997) is a Belgian road and track cyclist, who currently rides for UCI WorldTeam Decathlon CMA CGM.

As a junior, Ghys participated at the 2015 UCI Road World Championships in the Men's junior road race. He competed on the track at the 2016 UEC European Track Championships in the team pursuit and elimination race events. In 2018 he became European Champion in the Madison, together with Kenny De Ketele.

He signed for Decathlon CMA CGM ahead of the 2026 season.

== Major results ==
=== Road ===
2014
4th Overall Trophée Centre Morbihan
2015
9th Overall Trophée Centre Morbihan
2016
3rd Grand Prix des Marbriers
5th Kernen Omloop Echt-Susteren
6th Antwerpse Havenpijl
2017
3rd Omloop Het Nieuwsblad Beloften
4th Time trial, National Under–23 Championships
4th Paris–Roubaix Espoirs
8th Grand Prix des Marbriers
2018
3rd Overall An Post Ras

1st Young rider classification
1st Stage 8

9th Grand Prix Criquielion
2021
1st Stage 1 Tour of Belgium
2022
9th Grand Prix de Denain
2023
5th Rund um Köln
7th Overall ZLM Tour
2025
7th Bredene Koksijde Classic
2026
9th Grand Prix de Fourmies

=== Track ===
2018
1st Madison, UEC European Championships (with Kenny De Ketele)
2nd Six Days of Ghent (with Kenny De Ketele)
2019
3rd Madison, UCI World Championships (with Kenny De Ketele)
2021
1st Six Days of Ghent (with Kenny De Ketele)
3rd Madison, UCI World Championships (with Kenny De Ketele)
2022
1st Six Days of Ghent (with Lindsay De Vylder)
UEC European Championships

2nd Points race
3rd Madison (with Fabio Van Den Bossche)

2023
1st Six Days of Ghent (with Lindsay De Vylder)
2024
2nd Six Days of Ghent (with Lindsay De Vylder)
