= Eloy Teruel =

Spanish racing cyclist

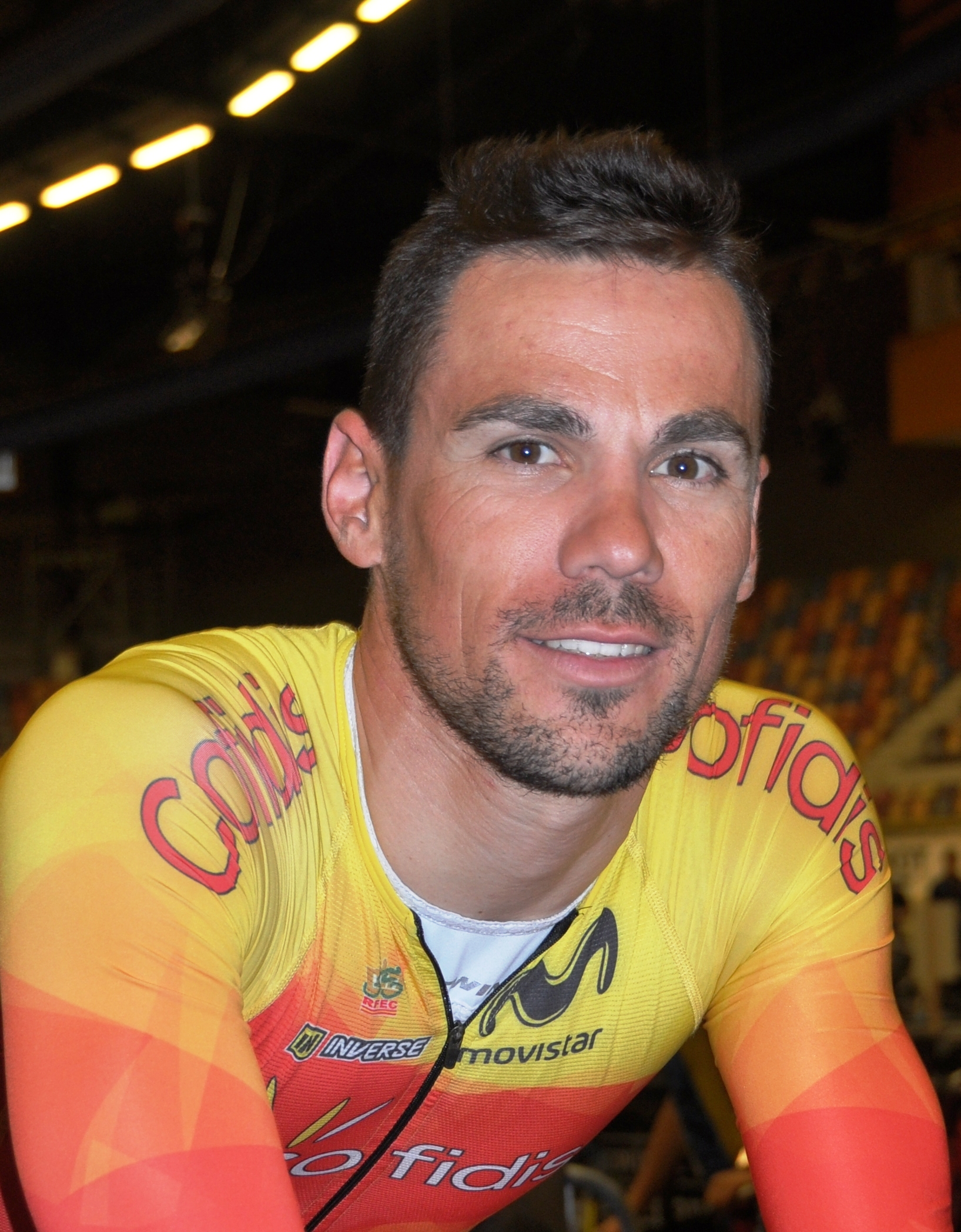
- Teruel in 2018

Personal information
- Full name: Eloy Teruel Rovira
- Born: 20 November 1982 (age 43)
- Height: 1.80 m (5 ft 11 in)
- Weight: 72 kg (159 lb)

Cycling career
- Sport: Cycling
- Current team: Valverde Team–Terra Fecundis
- Discipline: Road
- Role: Rider

Amateur teams
- 2005: Sotec–Murcia
- 2012: Mutua Levante–Cafemax
- 2018: Mutua Levante–Bioracer
- 2019: GSport–Plataforma Central Iberum
- 2020–: Valverde Team–Terra Fecundis

Professional teams
- 2006: 3 Molinos Resort
- 2007: Grupo Nicolas Mateos
- 2008–2009: Contentpolis–Murcia
- 2013: Movistar Team
- 2014: Jamis–Hagens Berman
- 2016: Louletano–Hospital de Loulé
- 2017: Team Sapura Cycling
Medal record
Men's track cycling
Representing Spain
Track World Championships
Silver medal – second place	2013 Minsk	Points race
Silver medal – second place	2015 Yvelines	Points race
Bronze medal – third place	2014 Cali	Points race
European Championships
Bronze medal – third place	2013 Apeldoorn	Points race

Eloy Teruel Rovira (born 20 November 1982) is a Spanish cyclist. At the 2012 Summer Olympics, he competed for Spain in the men's omnium. He signed with the Movistar Team for the 2013 road season, and joined Jamis–Hagens Berman for the 2014 season. As a rider for the Jamis team at the prestigious Tour of California, Eloy gained widespread coverage for celebrating what he believed to be a victory in the 7th stage, a lap before the end of the race; he ended up 56th.

== Major results ==
2005
2nd Gran Premio Ciudad de Vigo
2007
7th Prueba Villafranca de Ordizia
2013
2nd Points race, UCI Track World Championships
3rd Points race, UEC European Track Championships
2014
2nd Scratch race, UEC European Track Championships
3rd Points race, UCI Track World Championships
2015
2nd Points race, UCI Track World Championships
2019
5th Time trial, National Road Championships
