= Lasse Norman Leth =

Danish road cyclist

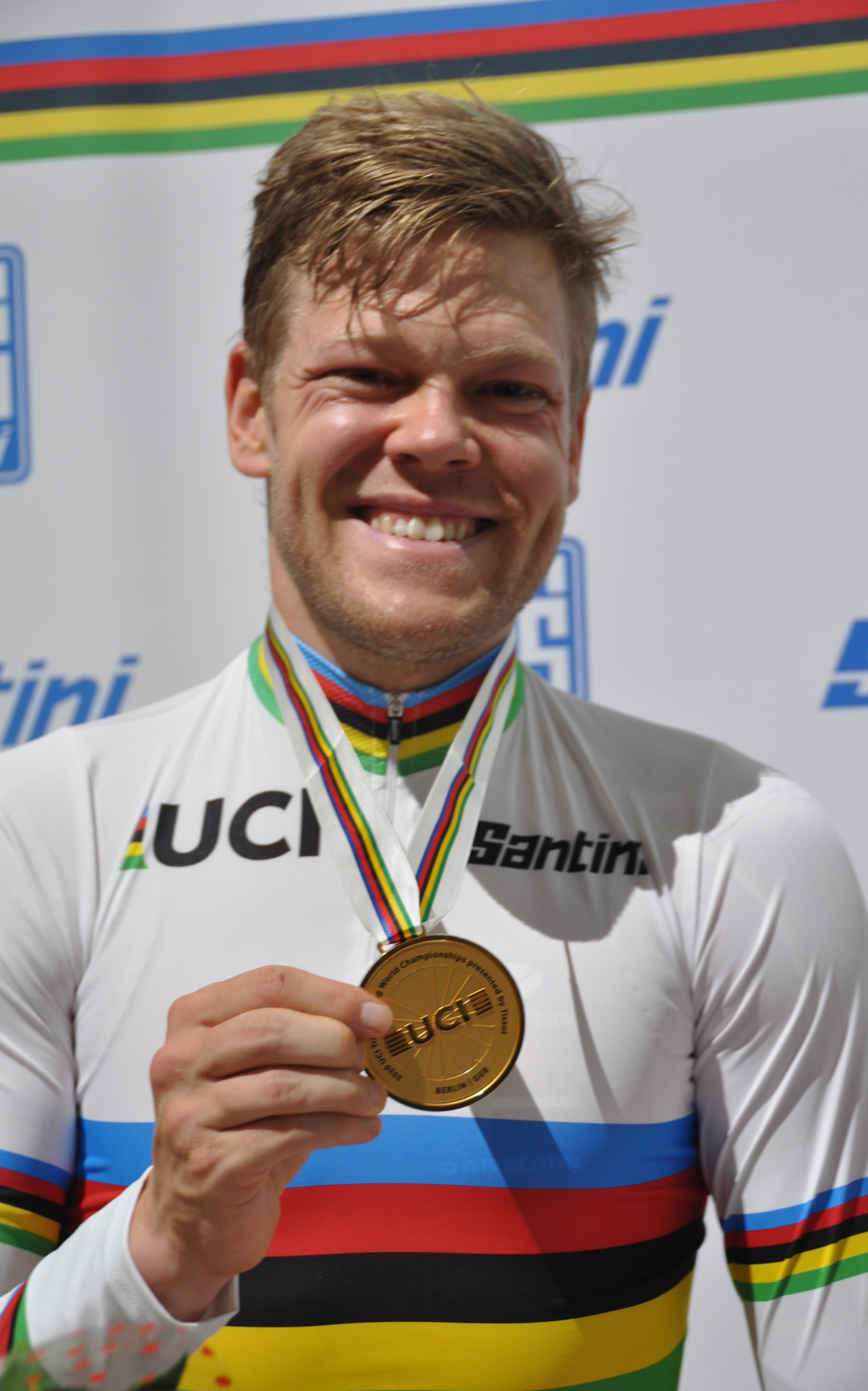
- Leth at the 2020 UCI Track Cycling World Championships

Personal information
- Born: Lasse Norman Hansen; 11 February 1992 (age 34) Faaborg, Denmark
- Height: 1.80 m (5 ft 11 in)
- Weight: 75 kg (165 lb)

Cycling career
- Sport: Cycling
- Current team: Team CO:PLAY–Giant Store
- Disciplines: Road; Track
- Role: Rider
- Rider type: Time trialist

Amateur team
- 2024–: Team CO:PLAY–Giant Store

Professional teams
- 2011: Concordia Forsikring–Himmerland
- 2012–2013: Blue Water Cycling
- 2014–2015: Garmin–Sharp
- 2016: Stölting Service Group
- 2017–2018: Aqua Blue Sport
- 2019–2020: Corendon–Circus
- 2021: Team Qhubeka Assos
- 2022–2023: Uno-X Pro Cycling Team

Major wins
- Track Olympic Games Madison (2020) Omnium (2012) World Championships Madison (2020, 2021, 2026) Team pursuit (2020, 2023, 2025, 2026)
Medal record
Representing Denmark
Men's track cycling
Olympic Games
Gold medal – first place	2012 London	Omnium
Gold medal – first place	2020 Tokyo	Madison
Silver medal – second place	2020 Tokyo	Team pursuit
Bronze medal – third place	2016 Rio de Janeiro	Team pursuit
Bronze medal – third place	2016 Rio de Janeiro	Omnium
World Championships
Gold medal – first place	2020 Berlin	Team pursuit
Gold medal – first place	2020 Berlin	Madison
Gold medal – first place	2021 Roubaix	Madison
Gold medal – first place	2023 Glasgow	Team pursuit
Gold medal – first place	2025 Santiago	Team pursuit
Gold medal – first place	2026 Shanghai	Team pursuit
Gold medal – first place	2026 Shanghai	Madison
Silver medal – second place	2013 Minsk	Omnium
Silver medal – second place	2014 Cali	Team pursuit
Silver medal – second place	2019 Pruszków	Madison
Bronze medal – third place	2012 Melbourne	Omnium
Bronze medal – third place	2013 Minsk	Team pursuit
Bronze medal – third place	2016 London	Team pursuit
Bronze medal – third place	2019 Pruszków	Team pursuit
Bronze medal – third place	2022 Saint-Quentin-en-Yvelines	Team pursuit
Bronze medal – third place	2025 Santiago	Madison
European Championships
Gold medal – first place	2019 Apeldoorn	Team pursuit
Gold medal – first place	2019 Apeldoorn	Madison
Gold medal – first place	2025 Heusden-Zolder	Team pursuit
Gold medal – first place	2026 Konya	Team pursuit
Silver medal – second place	2011 Apeldoorn	Team pursuit
Silver medal – second place	2015 Grenchen	Omnium
Silver medal – second place	2019 Apeldoorn	Omnium
Bronze medal – third place	2015 Grenchen	Team pursuit
Men's road bicycle racing
World Championships
Bronze medal – third place	2013 Florence	Under-23 time trial
Bronze medal – third place	2009 Mendrisio	Junior time trial

Lasse Norman Leth; né Norman Hansen; (born 11 February 1992) is a Danish professional road and track racing cyclist, who currently rides for Danish club team Team CO:PLAY–Giant Store. During his track cycling career, he has won five medals (including two golds) at the Summer Olympic Games, ten medals (including three golds) at the UCI Track Cycling World Championships and six medals (including two golds) at the UEC European Track Championships.

== Biography ==
He won the gold medal in the men's omnium at the 2012 Summer Olympics. After two seasons with Blue Water Cycling, He signed with the Garmin–Sharp squad for the 2014 and 2015 seasons. He was named in the startlist for the 2017 Vuelta a España. After the collapse of the Aqua Blue Sport team, in September 2018 he revealed that he would join the Corendon–Circus team on a two-year deal from the start of 2019, in part because they were willing to give him the freedom to compete on the track in the 2020 Summer Olympics in Tokyo.

In December 2020, he signed a one-year contract with Team Qhubeka Assos, for the 2021 season.

In August 2021, he won the gold medal in the Madison at the Tokyo 2020 Olympic Games in partnership with Michael Mørkøv.

== Personal life ==
He was born in Faaborg, Denmark and currently resides in Girona, Catalonia, Spain. He is the brother of racing cyclist Louise Norman Hansen.

In October 2022, he married fellow cyclist Julie Leth. Since then, both changed their surnames to Norman Leth.

== Major results ==
=== Road ===
2009
National Junior Championships

1st Road race
1st Time trial

3rd Time trial, UCI World Junior Championships
8th Overall Trofeo Karlsberg
2010
1st Time trial, National Junior Championships
2011
National Under-23 Championships

1st Road race
3rd Time trial

1st Stage 2 Coupe des nations Ville Saguenay
2012
1st Stage 7 Rás Tailteann
4th Time trial, UCI World Under-23 Championships
10th Time trial, UEC European Under-23 Road Championships
2013
National Under-23 Championships

1st Road race
1st Time trial

1st GP Herning
1st Eschborn-Frankfurt City Loop U23
2nd Overall Thüringen Rundfahrt der U23
3rd Time trial, UCI World Under-23 Championships
3rd Overall Tour de Berlin

1st Stage 2 (ITT)

5th Time trial, National Championships
8th Chrono Champenois
2014
3rd Overall Dubai Tour
2015
6th Overall Tour of Alberta

1st Stage 5

9th Velothon Berlin
2016
3rd Road race, National Championships
2017
1st Mountains classification, Tour de Suisse
3rd Dwars door West-Vlaanderen
2018
1st Stage 1 Herald Sun Tour
3rd Overall Danmark Rundt

1st Stage 1

3rd Grote Prijs Stad Zottegem
8th Ronde van Limburg
2019
3rd Ronde van Limburg
4th Overall Danmark Rundt

1st Stage 3

2022
7th Grand Prix Megasaray
7th Grand Prix Alanya
10th Druivenkoers Overijse
2023
4th Grand Prix Herning
2024
1st Fyen Rundt

==== Grand Tour general classification results timeline ====
Grand Tour	2017
Giro d'Italia	—
Tour de France	—
Vuelta a España	139

Legend
—	Did not compete
DNF	Did not finish

=== Track ===
2011
2nd Team pursuit, UEC European Championships
2012
1st Omnium, Olympic Games
UCI World Cup

1st Individual pursuit, Glasgow
1st Team pursuit, Glasgow

3rd Omnium, UCI World Championships
2013
1st Six Days of Copenhagen (with Michael Mørkøv)
UCI World Championships

2nd Omnium
3rd Team pursuit

UCI World Cup

2nd Points race, Manchester
2nd Team pursuit, Aguascalientes
3rd Team pursuit, Manchester

2014
2nd Team pursuit, UCI World Championships
3rd Team pursuit, UCI World Cup, London
2015
1st Omnium, UCI World Cup, Cambridge
UEC European Championships

2nd Omnium
3rd Team pursuit

2016
2nd Omnium, UCI World Cup, Hong Kong
Olympic Games

3rd Team pursuit
3rd Omnium

3rd Team pursuit, UCI World Championships
2017
1st Six Days of Copenhagen (with Michael Mørkøv)
2nd Six Days of Rotterdam (with Michael Mørkøv)
2018
UCI World Cup

1st Madison, Saint-Quentin-en-Yvelines (with Michael Mørkøv)
1st Team pursuit, Saint-Quentin-en-Yvelines
1st Team pursuit, Milton
1st Madison, Berlin (with Casper von Folsach)
2nd Team pursuit, Berlin

2019
UCI World Cup

1st Madison, Minsk (with Michael Mørkøv)
1st Team pursuit, Minsk
1st Team pursuit, Glasgow

UEC European Championships

1st Team pursuit
1st Madison (with Michael Mørkøv)
2nd Omnium

UCI World Championships

2nd Madison (with Casper von Folsach)
3rd Team pursuit

2nd Six Days of Rotterdam (with Marc Hester)
2020
UCI World Championships

1st Madison (with Michael Mørkøv)
1st Team pursuit

2021
Olympic Games

1st Madison (with Michael Mørkøv)
2nd Team pursuit

1st Madison, UCI World Championships (with Michael Mørkøv)
3rd Six Days of Ghent (with Michael Mørkøv)
2022
3rd Team pursuit, UCI World Championships
2023
1st Team pursuit, UCI World Championships
2025
UCI World Championships

1st Team pursuit
3rd Madison (with Niklas Larsen)

1st Team pursuit, UEC European Championships
2026
UCI World Championships

1st Madison (with Carl-Frederik Bévort)
1st Team pursuit
