= Bobby Lea =

American cyclist

Personal information
- Full name: Robert Lea
- Born: October 17, 1983 (age 42) Easton, Maryland, United States
- Height: 1.88 m (6 ft 2 in)
- Weight: 77 kg (170 lb)

Cycling career
- Sport: Cycling
- Current team: Custom Velo
- Disciplines: Track and road
- Role: Rider
- Rider type: Track: endurance

Professional teams
- 2006–2007: Toyota-United
- 2008: Rite Aid
- 2009: OUCH–Maxxis
- 2010: Bahati Foundation
- 2013: Team SmartStop
- 2014-: Custom Velo
Medal record
Men's track cycling
Representing United States
World Championships
Bronze medal – third place	2015 Yvelines	Scratch
Pan American Championships
Gold medal – first place	2012 Mar del Plata	Scratch
Gold medal – first place	2014 Aguascalientes	Individual pursuit
Gold medal – first place	2015 Santiago	Madison
Bronze medal – third place	2012 Mar del Plata	Omnium
Bronze medal – third place	2014 Aguascalientes	Points race

Robert "Bobby" Lea is an American track cyclist. At the 2008 Summer Olympics, he competed in the men's point race, which he did not finish, and the men's madison, where he finished in 16th place. At the 2012 Summer Olympics, he competed in the men's omnium.

== Doping case ==
After U.S. Track Nationals in 2015, Lea tested positive for noroxycodone, a metabolite of oxycodone found in Percocet which is a substance on the USADA banned list. Lea was given a 16-month suspension starting September 10, 2015. He petitioned the suspension to the Court of Arbitration for Sport and On February 26, 2016 his suspension was reduced to 6-months. Lea responded to his initial suspension by posting on his private website: "On the night of August 7th, in a state of post-race exhaustion and having run out of my normal sleep aid, I made the poor choice to take my prescription Percocet hoping it would help me rest."

== See also ==
- List of Pennsylvania State University Olympians
