= Zachary Bell =

Canadian cyclist (born 1982)

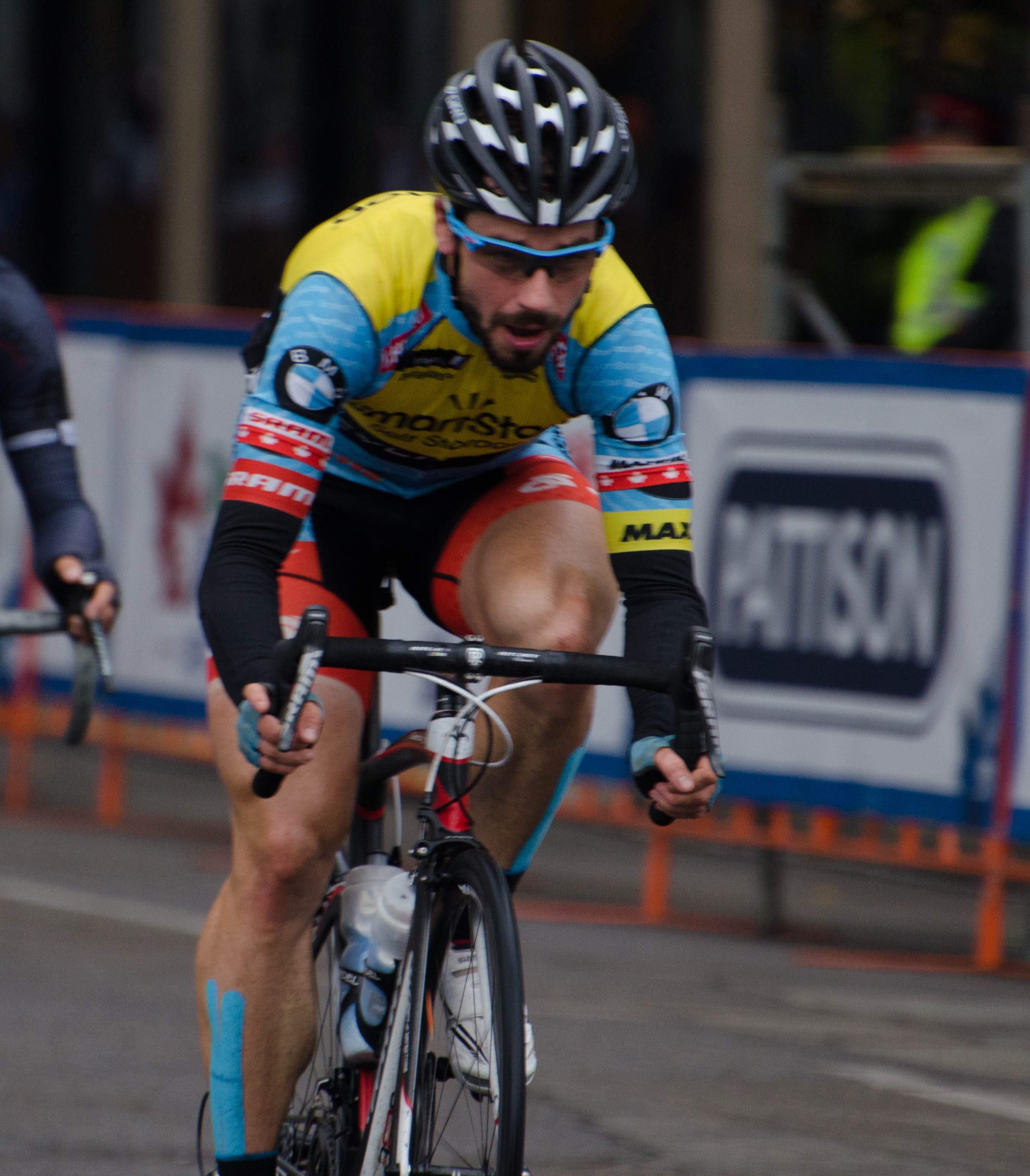
- Bell at the 2014 Tour of Alberta

Personal information
- Full name: Zachary Bell
- Nickname: Zach
- Born: November 14, 1982 (age 43) Whitehorse, Yukon, Canada
- Height: 1.75 m (5 ft 9 in)
- Weight: 73 kg (161 lb; 11.5 st)

Cycling career
- Sport: Cycling
- Current team: Human Powered Health
- Disciplines: Track; Road
- Role: Rider (retired); Directeur sportif
- Rider type: Endurance (track); Sprinter (road)

Professional teams
- 2005: Jet Fuel Coffee–Sympatico
- 2006: Rite Aid Pro Cycling
- 2007–2008: Symmetrics
- 2009–2010: Kelly Benefit Strategies
- 2011–2012: SpiderTech–C10
- 2013: Champion System
- 2014–2015: Team SmartStop

Managerial teams
- 2016–: Rally Cycling (women)
- 2018–2019: Rally Cycling (men)

Major wins
- UCI Track Cycling World Cup – Omnium (2010–2011); National Road Race Championships (2013)
Medal record
Representing Canada
Men's track cycling
World Championships
Silver medal – second place	2009 Pruszków	Omnium
Silver medal – second place	2012 Melbourne	Omnium
Men's road bicycle racing
Pan American Championships
Silver medal – second place	2007 Valencia	Time trial

Zachary "Zach" Bell (born November 14, 1982) is a Canadian former professional racing cyclist, who competed professionally between 2005 and 2015 for the Jet Fuel Coffee–Sympatico, Rite Aid Pro Cycling, Symmetrics, Kelly Benefit Strategies, SpiderTech–C10, Champion System, and Team SmartStop teams. Born in Whitehorse, Yukon, Bell resides in Watson Lake, Yukon, and now works as a directeur sportif for UCI Women's Team Human Powered Health.

== Career ==
At the 2008 Summer Olympics, Bell finished 7th in the men's points race and 12th in the men's madison (cycling). He finished 2nd in the men's omnium at the 2012 UCI Track Cycling World Championships in Melbourne. Later that year, Bell finished 8th in the men's omnium at the 2012 Summer Olympics.

== Major results ==
2003
1st Stage 1 Tour de Delta
2004
2nd Time trial, National Under-23 Road Championships
2005
1st Stampede Road Race
2006
1st Stage 7 Tour of Shenandoah
2007
1st Overall Tour de Delta

1st Stages 1 & 2

1st Burnaby Six Days
Tour de Bowness

1st Criterium
1st Hill Climb

Vuelta a El Salvador

1st Stages 4 & 7

1st Stage 2 Tour de White Rock
2nd Scratch, 2007–08 UCI Track Cycling World Cup Classics, Sydney
2nd Time trial, Pan American Road Championships
National Road Championships

2nd Criterium
3rd Time trial

2008
Pan American Road and Track Championships

1st Madison
1st Omnium
5th Time trial

1st Burnaby Six Days
3rd Time trial, National Road Championships
2009
1st Overall Fitchburg Longsjo Classic
2nd Omnium, UCI Track Cycling World Championships
3rd Time trial, National Road Championships
6th Overall Tour of Thailand
2010
2nd Time trial, National Road Championships
Commonwealth Games

3rd Scratch
7th Time trial

2011
3rd Road race, National Road Championships
2012
2nd Omnium, UCI Track Cycling World Championships
2013
National Road Championships

1st Road race
3rd Time trial

1st Stage 4 Tour de Taiwan
1st Stage 6 Tour de Korea
2014
1st Bucks County Classic
3rd Winston-Salem Cycling Classic
2015
8th Overall Vuelta a la Independencia Nacional
