= Glenn O'Shea =

Australian cyclist (born 1989)

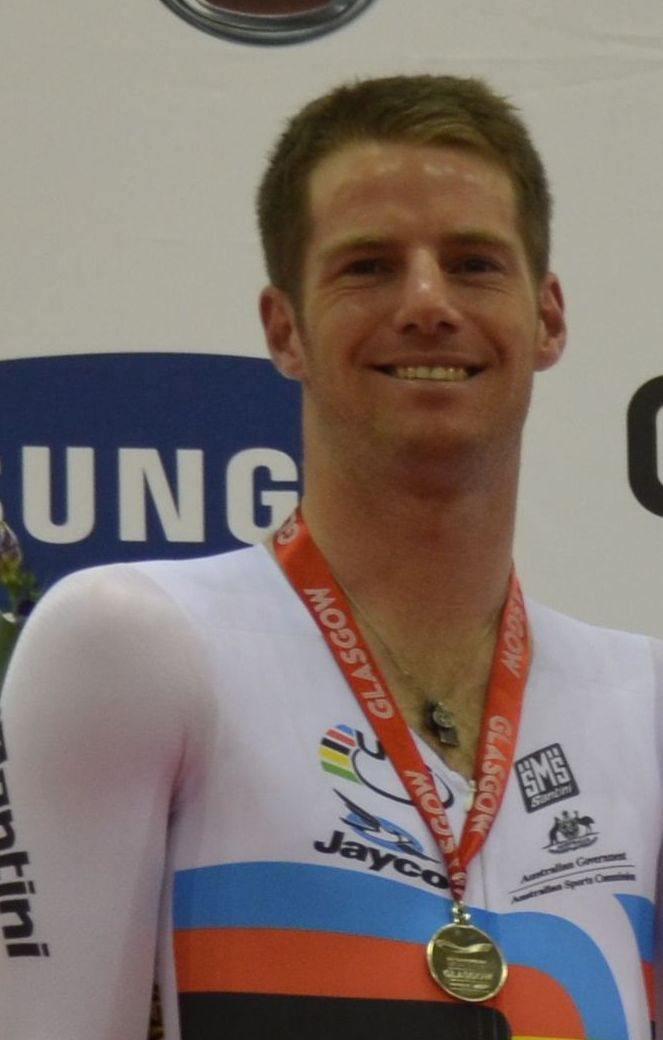
- O'Shea during the Glasgow event of the 2012–2013 UCI Track Cycling World Cup Classics season.

Personal information
- Born: 14 June 1989 (age 37) Swan Hill, Victoria
- Height: 180 cm (5 ft 11 in)
- Weight: 76 kg (168 lb)

Cycling career
- Sport: Cycling
- Disciplines: Road and track
- Role: Rider

Amateur teams
- 2009: Australian Institute of Sport
- 2013: Garmin–Sharp (stagiaire)

Professional teams
- 2010–2012: Jayco–AIS
- 2013–2014: An Post–Chain Reaction
- 2015: Team Budget Forklifts
- 2016: ONE Pro Cycling

Major wins
- Track World Championships Omnium (2012) Team pursuit (2013)
Medal record
Olympic Games
Silver medal – second place	2012 London	Team pursuit
UCI Track Cycling World Championships
Gold medal – first place	2012 Melbourne	Omnium
Gold medal – first place	2013 Minsk	Team Pursuit
Gold medal – first place	2014 Cali	Team Pursuit
Silver medal – second place	2012 Melbourne	Team Pursuit
Silver medal – second place	2015 Yvelines	Omnium
Bronze medal – third place	2013 Minsk	Omnium
Bronze medal – third place	2016 London	Omnium
Commonwealth Games
Gold medal – first place	2014 Glasgow	Team Pursuit
Silver medal – second place	2014 Glasgow	Scratch Race

Glenn O'Shea (born 14 June 1989, Swan Hill) is an Australian track cyclist who won the Omnium at the 2012 UCI Track Cycling World Championships. He was also a member of the Australian team that won silver in the team pursuit at the 2012 World Championships and the 2012 Olympics.

O'Shea briefly quit cycling as an under-23 in 2010 after contracting a severe case of glandular fever. However, after a representing the Australia in team pursuit and omnium in both the Worlds and the Olympics in 2012, he joined the An Post–Chain Reaction continental cycling team for 2013. A third place at Ronde de l'Oise, in which he celebrated a stage win and wore the leader's jersey led to interest from Garmin–Sharp for whom he rode in the 2013 World Ports Classic. He started the 2013 Tour of Britain as lead-out man for Steele Von Hoff.

He remained with An Post–Chain Reaction into 2014. In 2014, he won gold in the men's team pursuit (in a new Games record) and silver in the men's scratch race at the 2014 Commonwealth Games. In November 2014 O'Shea was announced as part of the Team Budget Forklifts line-up for 2015 alongside fellow members of the Australian endurance track squad Luke Davison, Jack Bobridge, Scott Sunderland and Mitchel Mulhearn, riding a domestic programme with a focus on achieving success on the track at the 2016 Summer Olympics. O'Shea signed for ONE Pro Cycling for 2016.

== Major results ==
=== Road ===
2008
4th Grafton–Inverell
6th Overall Thüringen Rundfahrt der U23
2011
5th Overall Canberra Tour

1st Stage 4

2013
3rd Overall Ronde de l'Oise

1st Stage 2

6th Ronde van Limburg
2014
8th Overall Herald Sun Tour
2016
1st Stage 1 (TTT) Ronde van Midden-Nederland

=== Track ===
2007
UCI World Junior Championships

1st Omnium
1st Team pursuit
2nd Madison (with Leigh Howard)

Oceania Championships

1st Omnium
1st Scratch

1st Madison, National Championships (with Jack Bobridge)
National Junior Championships

1st Points race
2nd Kilo
2nd Omnium

2008
National Championships

1st Madison (with Leigh Howard)
1st Team pursuit
1st Omnium
3rd Points race

UIV Cup U23

1st Amsterdam
1st Munich

1st Points race, UCI World Cup Classics, Melbourne
2009
National Championships

1st Scratch
1st Points race
2nd Team pursuit

UCI World Cup Classics, Beijing

1st Madison (with Leigh Howard)
1st Team pursuit

2010
1st Madison, National Championships
2011
National Championships

1st (with Leigh Howard)
1st Team pursuit
2nd Points race
3rd Scratch

UCI World Cup, Astana

1st Individual pursuit
1st Madison (with Alex Edmondson)

2nd Six Days of Zürich (with Silvan Dillier)
2012
UCI World Championships

1st Omnium
2nd Team pursuit

1st Team pursuit, National Championships
1st Omnium, UCI World Cup, Beijing
1st Six Days of Ghent (with Iljo Keisse)
2nd Team pursuit, Olympic Games
2013
UCI World Championships

1st Team pursuit
3rd Omnium

National Championships

1st Kilo
1st Team pursuit

2014
Commonwealth Games

1st Team pursuit
2nd Scratch

National Championships

1st Points race
1st Team pursuit
2nd Scratch

2015
2nd Omnium, UCI World Championships
2019
1st Madison, National Championships (with Leigh Howard)
2021
1st Madison, National Championships (with Leigh Howard)
