= Roger Kluge =

German cyclist (born 1986)

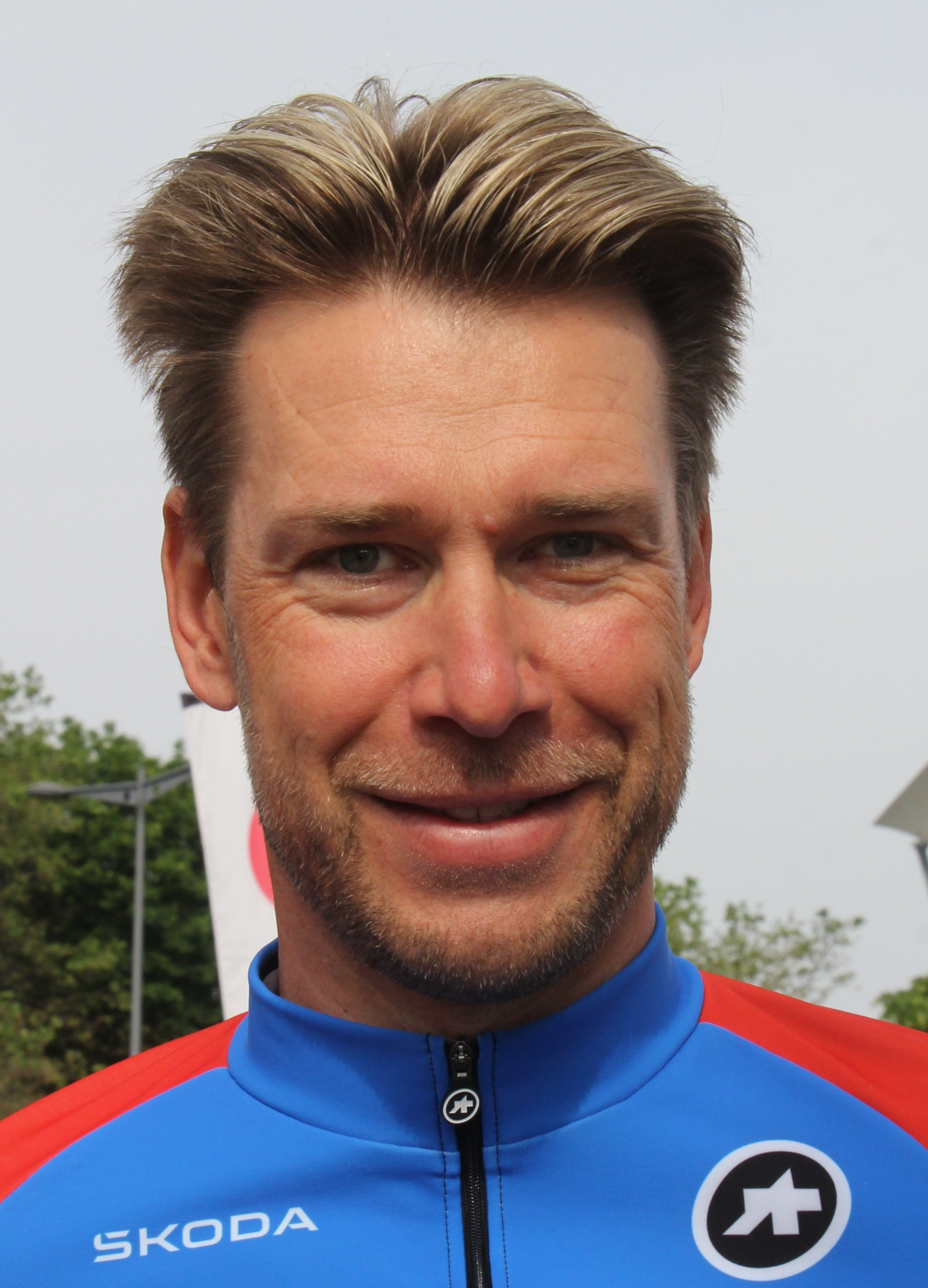
- Kluge in 2023

Personal information
- Born: 5 February 1986 (age 40) Eisenhüttenstadt, East Germany
- Height: 1.92 m (6 ft 4 in)
- Weight: 83 kg (183 lb)

Cycling career
- Sport: Cycling
- Current team: Rad-Net Oßwald
- Disciplines: Road; Track
- Role: Rider
- Rider type: Sprinter; Lead-out specialist

Amateur teams
- 2004: RG Cottbus
- 2004–2007: RK Endspurt 09 Cottbus
- 2005–2006: Team POT Cottbus
- 2006–2007: Team POT Brandenburg

Professional teams
- 2008–2009: LKT Team Brandenburg
- 2010: Team Milram
- 2011–2012: Skil–Shimano
- 2013: NetApp–Endura
- 2014–2016: IAM Cycling
- 2017–2018: Orica–Scott
- 2019–2022: Lotto–Soudal
- 2023–: Rad-Net Oßwald

Major wins
- Road Grand Tours Giro d'Italia 1 individual stage (2016) Track World Championships Madison (2018, 2019, 2024)
Medal record
Men's track cycling
Representing Germany
Olympic Games
Silver medal – second place	2008 Beijing	Points race
World Championships
Gold medal – first place	2018 Apeldoorn	Madison
Gold medal – first place	2019 Pruszków	Madison
Gold medal – first place	2024 Ballerup	Madison
Silver medal – second place	2008 Manchester	Madison
Silver medal – second place	2016 London	Omnium
Silver medal – second place	2022 Saint-Quentin-en-Yvelines	Points race
Bronze medal – third place	2008 Manchester	Scratch
Bronze medal – third place	2020 Berlin	Madison
Bronze medal – third place	2026 Shanghai	Madison
European Championships
Gold medal – first place	2010 Pruszków	Omnium
Gold medal – first place	2022 Munich	Madison
Gold medal – first place	2023 Grenchen	Madison
Gold medal – first place	2024 Apeldoorn	Madison
Gold medal – first place	2026 Konya	Madison
Silver medal – second place	2018 Glasgow	Madison
Silver medal – second place	2025 Heusden-Zolder	Madison
Bronze medal – third place	2026 Konya	Omnium

Roger Kluge (born 5 February 1986) is a German professional racing cyclist, who currently rides for UCI Continental team Rad-Net Oßwald. Kluge left NetApp–Endura at the end of the 2013 season, and joined IAM Cycling for the 2014 season. At the 2008 Summer Olympics, he won the silver medal in the men's points race.

== Major results ==
=== Road ===
2007
1st Overall Brandenburg Rundfahrt

1st Stage 2

2nd Berlin–Bad Freienwald–Berlin
2nd Fyen Rundt
2nd Prague–Karlovy Vary–Prague
3rd Rund um den Schäferberg
2008
1st Stage 1 Mainfranken-Tour
4th Overall Course de Solidarność et des Champions Olympiques
9th Overall Tour de Berlin

1st Stage 4

2009 (2 pro wins)
Course de Solidarność et des Champions Olympiques

1st Stages 2 & 4

1st Stage 4 Tour de Serbie
National Championships

3rd Road race
5th Time trial

9th Overall Bałtyk–Karkonosze Tour

1st Stage 6

2010 (1)
1st Neuseen Classics
4th Overall Tour of Qatar

1st Young rider classification

5th Time trial, National Championships
10th Nokere Koerse
2011
4th Overall Delta Tour Zeeland
5th Road race, National Championships
5th Binche–Chimay–Binche
2012
3rd Clásica de Almería
2013
5th Velothon Berlin
7th Rund um Köln
10th Overall Driedaagse van West-Vlaanderen
10th Grote Prijs Stad Zottegem
2015 (1)
1st Prologue Ster ZLM Toer
4th Overall Bay Classic Series
2016 (1)
1st Stage 17 Giro d'Italia
6th Overall Ster ZLM Toer
2017
10th Arnhem–Veenendaal Classic
2019
4th Down Under Classic
2020
9th Race Torquay
2022
9th Memorial Rik Van Steenbergen

==== Grand Tour general classification results timeline ====
Grand Tour	2010	2011	2012	2013	2014	2015	2016	2017	2018	2019	2020	2021	2022
Giro d'Italia	—	—	—	—	—	162	137	—	—	DNF	—	DNF	149
Tour de France	DNF	—	—	—	139	—	—	—	—	150	146	DNF	—
Vuelta a España	Has not contested during his career												

Legend
—	Did not compete
DNF	Did not finish

=== Track ===
2003
National Junior Championships

2nd Keirin
3rd Team sprint

2004
2nd Madison, National Junior Championships
2005
3rd Munich, UIV Cup
2006
UIV Cup

1st Copenhagen
2nd Ghent
3rd Bremen

2nd Points race, National Championships
3rd Madison, UEC European Under-23 Championships
2007
National Championships

1st Points race
2nd Team pursuit
2nd Madison

UCI World Cup Classics

1st Scratch, Sydney
2nd Scratch, Manchester

2nd Scratch, UEC European Under-23 Championships
2nd Rotterdam, UIV Cup
2008
2nd Points race, Olympic Games
2nd Six Days of Grenoble (with Olaf Pollack)
3rd Madison, UCI World Cup Classics, Los Angeles (with Olaf Pollack)
3rd Six Days of Munich (with Olaf Pollack)
2009
1st Madison, UEC European Championships
National Championships

1st Madison (with Olaf Pollack)
1st Team pursuit
2nd Points race

1st Six Days of Amsterdam (with Robert Bartko)
2nd Six Days of Ghent (with Iljo Keisse)
3rd Six Days of Berlin (with Kenny De Ketele)
2010
1st Omnium, UEC European Championships
1st Six Days of Amsterdam (with Robert Bartko)
2nd Six Days of Berlin (with Robert Bartko)
2011
1st Six Days of Berlin (with Robert Bartko)
2012
1st Individual pursuit, National Championships
2nd Six Days of Zürich (with Danilo Hondo)
2013
1st Team pursuit, National Championships
1st Six Days of Berlin (with Peter Schep)
2015
1st Omnium, National Championships
2016
2nd Omnium, UCI World Championships
2nd Six Days of Berlin (with Marcel Kalz)
2017
1st Six Days of Rotterdam (with Christian Grasmann)
2018
1st Madison, UCI World Championships (with Theo Reinhardt)
3rd Six Days of London (with Theo Reinhardt)
2019
1st Madison, UCI World Championships (with Theo Reinhardt)
1st Six Days of Berlin (with Theo Reinhardt)
2021
2nd Six Days of Ghent (with Jasper De Buyst)
2022
1st Six Days of Berlin (with Theo Reinhardt)
2nd Points race, UCI World Championships
2024
1st Madison, UCI World Championships (with Tim Torn Teutenberg)
1st Madison, UEC European Championships (with Theo Reinhardt)
2nd Three Days of London (with Theo Reinhardt)
2025
2nd Madison, UEC European Championships (with Tim Torn Teutenberg)
2026
UEC European Championships

1st Madison (with Moritz Augenstein)
3rd Omnium

3rd Madison, UCI World Championships (with Moritz Augenstein)
