= 2011 UCI Track Cycling World Championships – Men's team pursuit =

Rainbow jersey

The Men's team pursuit at the 2011 UCI Track Cycling World Championships was held on March 23. 17 nations of 4 cyclists each participated in the contest. After the qualifying, the fastest 2 teams raced for gold, and 3rd and 4th teams raced for bronze.

== Results ==
=== Qualifying ===
Qualifying was held at 15:00.

Rank	Name	Nation	Time	Notes
1	Jack Bobridge; Rohan Dennis; Luke Durbridge; Michael Hepburn	Australia	4:00.168	Q
2	Alexei Markov; Evgeny Kovalev; Ivan Kovalev; Alexander Serov	Russia	4:00.965	Q
3	Ed Clancy; Steven Burke; Peter Kennaugh; Andy Tennant	United Kingdom	4:02.764	q
4	Sam Bewley; Peter Latham; Marc Ryan; Jesse Sergent	New Zealand	4:04.164	q
5	Eloy Teruel Rovira; Pablo Bernal; Asier Maeztu Billelabeitia; David Muntaner Juaneda	Spain	4:06.187	
6	Tim Veldt; Levi Heimans; Jenning Huizenga; Arno van der Zwet	Netherlands	4:06.552	
7	Nikias Arndt; Henning Bommel; Stefan Schaefer; Jakob Steigmiller	Germany	4:06.977	
8	Gijs van Hoecke; Dominique Cornu; Ingmar De Poortere; Jonathan Dufrasne	Belgium	4:07.198	
9	Lasse Norman Hansen; Niki Byrgesen; Rasmus Christian Quaade; Christian Ranneries	Denmark	4:07.820	
10	Juan Esteban Arango; Arles Castro; Edwin Ávila; Weimar Roldán	Colombia	4:09.066	
11	Sergiy Lagkuti; Maxim Polischuk; Mykhaylo Radionov; Vitaliy Shchedov	Ukraine	4:09.889	
12	Vivien Brisse; Benoît Daeninck; Julien Duval; Julien Morice	France	4:11.497	
13	Alexander Äschbach; Silvan Dillier; Claudio Imhof; Loïc Perizzolo	Switzerland	4:11.582	
14	Luis Mansilla; Antonio Cabrera; Pablo Seisdedos; Luis Fernando Sepúlveda	Chile	4:12.368	
15	Elia Viviani; Omar Bertazzo; Giairo Ermeti; Michele Scartezzini	Italy	4:12.770	
16	Ioannis Tamouridis; Georgios Bouglas; Dimitrios Polydoropoulos; Polychronis Tzottzakis	Greece	4:13.191	
17	Kwok Ho Ting; Cheung King Lok; Cheung King Wai; Choi Ki Ho	Hong Kong	4:15.608	

=== Finals ===
The finals were held at 19:45.

Rank	Name	Nation	Time
Gold Medal Race
1st place, gold medalist(s)	Jack Bobridge; Rohan Dennis; Luke Durbridge; Michael Hepburn	Australia	3:57.832
2nd place, silver medalist(s)	Alexei Markov; Evgeny Kovalev; Ivan Kovalev; Alexander Serov	Russia	4:02.229
Bronze Medal Race
3rd place, bronze medalist(s)	Steven Burke; Sam Harrison; Peter Kennaugh; Andy Tennant	United Kingdom	4:02.781
4	Sam Bewley; Peter Latham; Marc Ryan; Jesse Sergent	New Zealand	4:05.977
