= 2010 UCI Track Cycling World Championships – Men's individual pursuit =

Men's individual pursuit at the 2010 UCI Track Cycling World Championships
- Venue: Ballerup Super Arena
- Location: Ballerup, Denmark
- Dates: 25 March 2010
- Winning time: 4:16.600

Medalists
gold medal	Taylor Phinney	United States
silver medal	Jesse Sergent	New Zealand
bronze medal	Jack Bobridge	Australia

The Men's Individual Pursuit was one of the 10 men's events at the 2010 UCI Track Cycling World Championships, held in Ballerup, Denmark on 25 March 2010.

Twenty-seven cyclists from 20 countries participated in the contest. After the qualification, the two fastest riders advanced to the final and the 3rd- and 4th-best riders raced for the bronze medal.

The qualification took place on 25 March and the finals later the same day.

== World record ==
World Record
WR	4:11.114	Chris Boardman (GBR)	Manchester (United Kingdom)	29 August 1996

== Qualifying ==
Rank	Name	Nation	Time	Notes
1	Jesse Sergent	New Zealand	4:15.988	Q
2	Taylor Phinney	United States	4:16.102	Q
3	Jack Bobridge	Australia	4:17.169	Q
4	Alexander Serov	Russia	4:18.356	Q
5	Rohan Dennis	Australia	4:19.292	
6	Vitaliy Shchedov	Ukraine	4:20.316	
7	Westley Gough	New Zealand	4:20.685	
8	Lasse Norman Hansen	Denmark	4:22.239	
9	Vitaliy Popkov	Ukraine	4:22.999	
10	Juan Esteban Arango	Colombia	4:23.595	
11	Patrick Gretsch	Germany	4:24.224	
12	David O'Loughlin	Ireland	4:25.203	
13	Artur Ershov	Russia	4:25.352	
14	Marco Coledan	Italy	4:26.267	
15	Levi Heimans	Netherlands	4:26.405	
16	Arno van der Zwet	Netherlands	4:26.677	
17	Ingmar De Poortere	Belgium	4:27.400	
18	Albert Torres	Spain	4:28.327	
19	Jonathan Dufrasne	Belgium	4:29.416	
20	Cheung King Lok	Hong Kong	4:32.195	
21	Julien Morice	France	4:33.391	
22	Gediminas Bagdonas	Lithuania	4:33.590	
23	Wang Jie	China	4:34.747	
24	Jiang Xiao	China	4:38.331	
25	Magkoyras Neofytos Sakellaridis	Greece	4:39.081	
26	Silvan Dillier	Switzerland	4:47.445	
	Alexey Kolessov	Kazakhstan	DSQ	

== Finals ==
Rank	Name	Nation	Time
Gold Medal Race
1st place, gold medalist(s)	Taylor Phinney	United States	4:16.600
2nd place, silver medalist(s)	Jesse Sergent	New Zealand	4:18.459
Bronze Medal Race
3rd place, bronze medalist(s)	Jack Bobridge	Australia	4:18.066
4	Alexander Serov	Russia	4:21.263
