= Cycling at the 2012 Summer Olympics =

Cycling at the Games of the XXX Olympiad
- Pictograms for, from top, BMX, mountain, road, and track cycling.
- Venue: London Velopark (BMX, track); Hadleigh Farm (mountain); Central London, Surrey (road)
- Dates: 28 July – 12 August 2012
- Competitors: Total: 505; 48 (BMX); 77 (mountain biking); 210 (road cycling); 176 (track cycling)

The cycling competitions at the 2012 Olympic Games in London took place at five venues between 28 July and 12 August. The venues were the London Velopark for track cycling and BMX, and Hadleigh Farm, in Essex, for mountain biking. The road races took place over a course starting and ending in The Mall in central London and heading out into Surrey, while the time trials started and finished at Hampton Court Palace in Richmond upon Thames. Eighteen events were contested and around 500 athletes participated.

Cycling events have been contested in every Summer Olympics programme since the first modern Olympiad in 1896 alongside athletics, artistic gymnastics, fencing and swimming. Compared to the cycling at the 2008 Olympics, there were many changes in the Olympic track cycling programme. The men's and women's individual pursuit and points race, and the men's Madison were removed. Team sprint, team pursuit and keirin were added to the women's programme, while Omnium was a new race for both men and women. Countries were restricted to one entry per track event, a restriction which seemed to be directed at preventing the British team from double-medalling in the same event as they had in four events in 2008, thus lowering their medal chances. However, similar to the 2008 Beijing Games, the cycling events were dominated by the British team, which, with a haul including eight gold medals, was the only nation to win more than a single gold medal.

== Venues ==
The road racing at the Olympics and Paralympic Games was originally scheduled to take place in Regent's Park and on Hampstead Heath. Instead, the Olympic road races started and finished on The Mall in central London and headed out in a south-westerly direction to include loops around Box Hill in Surrey. Road racing in the Paralympics took place at Brands Hatch. The Olympic mountain bike event took place at Hadleigh Farm after the UCI labeled the course at Weald Country Park "too easy" in July 2008. It was touted that the course could be created in Wales. A location in Kent was also considered.

== Participating nations ==
Cyclists from 74 nations participated at the 2012 Summer Olympics.

- Algeria (1)
- Argentina (4)
- Australia (29)
- Austria (5)
- Azerbaijan (1)
- Belarus (10)
- Belgium (16)
- Brazil (9)
- Bulgaria (2)
- Canada (17)
- Chile (3)
- China (12)
- Colombia (17)
- Costa Rica (2)
- Croatia (2)
- Cuba (5)
- Cyprus (1)
- Czech Republic (10)
- Denmark (11)
- Ecuador (2)
- Eritrea (1)
- El Salvador (1)
- Estonia (2)
- Finland (2)
- France (24)
- Georgia (1)
- Germany (25)
- Great Britain (27)
- Greece (4)
- Guam (1)
- Guatemala (1)
- Hong Kong (6)
- Hungary (3)
- Iran (3)
- Ireland (4)
- Italy (14)
- Japan (9)
- Kazakhstan (2)
- Latvia (5)
- Lithuania (4)
- Luxembourg (2)
- Malaysia (5)
- Morocco (3)
- Mauritius (1)
- Mexico (2)
- Moldova (1)
- Namibia (2)
- Netherlands (25)
- New Zealand (22)
- Norway (6)
- Philippines (1)
- Poland (12)
- Portugal (4)
- Romania (1)
- Russia (18)
- Rwanda (1)
- Serbia (2)
- Slovakia (1)
- Slovenia (6)
- South Africa (9)
- South Korea (10)
- Spain (16)
- Sweden (5)
- Switzerland (11)
- Syria (1)
- Thailand (1)
- Chinese Taipei (2)
- Trinidad and Tobago (2)
- Turkey (3)
- Ukraine (10)
- United States (24)
- Uruguay (1)
- Uzbekistan (2)
- Venezuela (12)

== Competition schedule ==
H	Heats/preliminaries	¼	Quarterfinals	½	Semifinals	F	Final

BMX, mountain biking and road cycling
Event↓/Date →	Sat 28	Sun 29	Wed 1	Wed 8	Thu 9	Fri 10		Sat 11	Sun 12
Men's BMX				H	¼	½	F		
Women's BMX				H		½	F		
Mountain biking
Men's cross-country									F
Women's cross-country								F	
Road cycling
Men's road race	F								
Men's time trial			F						
Women's road race		F							
Women's time trial			F						

Track cycling
Date →	Thu 2			Fri 3		Sat 4			Sun 5			Mon 6			Tue 7		
Event ↓	A			A		M	A		M	A		A			M	A	
Men's Keirin															H	½	F
Men's Omnium						FL	PR	ER	IP	SR	TT						
Men's sprint						H				¼		½		F			
Men's team pursuit	H			½	F												
Men's team sprint	H	½	F														
Women's Keirin				H	F												
Women's Omnium												FL	PR	ER	IP	SR	TT
Women's sprint									H			¼				½	F
Women's team pursuit				H			½	F									
Women's team sprint	H	½	F														

M = Morning session, A = Afternoon session
FL = Flying Lap, PR = Points Race, ER = Elimination Race, IP = Individual Pursuit, SR = Scratch Race, TT = Time Trial

== Medal table ==
Rank	Nation	Gold	Silver	Bronze	Total
1	Great Britain	8	2	2	12
2	Germany	1	4	1	6
3	France	1	3	0	4
4	Australia	1	2	3	6
5	United States	1	2	1	4
6	Colombia	1	1	1	3
7	Netherlands	1	0	2	3
8	Czech Republic	1	0	0	1
8	Denmark	1	0	0	1
8	Kazakhstan	1	0	0	1
8	Latvia	1	0	0	1
12	China	0	2	1	3
13	New Zealand	0	1	2	3
14	Switzerland	0	1	0	1
15	Russia	0	0	2	2
16	Canada	0	0	1	1
16	Hong Kong	0	0	1	1
16	Italy	0	0	1	1
16	Norway	0	0	1	1
Totals (19 entries)		18	18	19	55

== Road cycling ==
Games	Gold	Silver	Bronze
Men's road race	Alexander Vinokourov; Kazakhstan	Rigoberto Urán; Colombia	Alexander Kristoff; Norway
Men's time trial	Bradley Wiggins; Great Britain	Tony Martin; Germany	Chris Froome; Great Britain
Women's road race	Marianne Vos; Netherlands	Lizzie Armitstead; Great Britain	Olga Zabelinskaya; Russia
Women's time trial	Kristin Armstrong; United States	Judith Arndt; Germany	Olga Zabelinskaya; Russia

== Track cycling ==
=== Men ===
Games	Gold	Silver	Bronze
Keirin	Chris Hoy; Great Britain	Maximilian Levy; Germany	Simon van Velthooven; New Zealand
Keirin	Chris Hoy; Great Britain	Maximilian Levy; Germany	Teun Mulder; Netherlands
Omnium	Lasse Norman Hansen; Denmark	Bryan Coquard; France	Ed Clancy; Great Britain
Team pursuit	Great Britain; Ed Clancy; Geraint Thomas; Steven Burke; Peter Kennaugh	Australia; Jack Bobridge; Glenn O'Shea; Rohan Dennis; Michael Hepburn	New Zealand; Sam Bewley; Aaron Gate; Marc Ryan; Jesse Sergent; Westley Gough
Sprint	Jason Kenny; Great Britain	Grégory Baugé; France	Shane Perkins; Australia
Team sprint	Great Britain; Philip Hindes; Chris Hoy; Jason Kenny	France; Grégory Baugé; Michaël D'Almeida; Kévin Sireau	Germany; René Enders; Maximilian Levy; Robert Förstemann

=== Women ===
Games	Gold	Silver	Bronze
Keirin	Victoria Pendleton; Great Britain	Guo Shuang; China	Lee Wai Sze; Hong Kong
Omnium	Laura Trott; Great Britain	Sarah Hammer; United States	Annette Edmondson; Australia
Team pursuit	Great Britain; Dani King; Laura Trott; Joanna Rowsell	United States; Sarah Hammer; Dotsie Bausch; Jennie Reed; Lauren Tamayo	Canada; Tara Whitten; Gillian Carleton; Jasmin Glaesser
Sprint	Anna Meares; Australia	Victoria Pendleton; Great Britain	Guo Shuang; China
Team sprint	Germany; Kristina Vogel; Miriam Welte	China; Gong Jinjie; Guo Shuang	Australia; Kaarle McCulloch; Anna Meares

== Mountain biking ==
Games	Gold	Silver	Bronze
Men's	Jaroslav Kulhavý; Czech Republic	Nino Schurter; Switzerland	Marco Aurelio Fontana; Italy
Women's	Julie Bresset; France	Sabine Spitz; Germany	Georgia Gould; United States

== BMX ==
Games	Gold	Silver	Bronze
Men's	Māris Štrombergs; Latvia	Sam Willoughby; Australia	Carlos Oquendo; Colombia
Women's	Mariana Pajón; Colombia	Sarah Walker; New Zealand	Laura Smulders; Netherlands

== Broken records ==
Event	Name	Nation	Score	Date	Record
Women's team sprint	Gong Jinjie; Guo Shuang	China	32.447 s	2 August	WR, OR
Women's team sprint	Gong Jinjie; Guo Shuang	China	32.422 s	2 August	WR, OR
Men's team sprint	Philip Hindes; Chris Hoy; Jason Kenny	Great Britain	42.747 s	2 August	WR, OR
Men's team sprint	Philip Hindes; Chris Hoy; Jason Kenny	Great Britain	42.600 s	2 August	WR, OR
Men's team pursuit	Ed Clancy; Geraint Thomas; Steven Burke; Peter Kennaugh	Great Britain	3:52.499	2 August	WR, OR
Men's team pursuit	Ed Clancy; Geraint Thomas; Steven Burke; Peter Kennaugh	Great Britain	3:51.659	3 August	WR, OR
Women's team pursuit	Dani King; Laura Trott; Joanna Rowsell	Great Britain	3:15.669	3 August	WR, OR
Women's team pursuit	Dani King; Laura Trott; Joanna Rowsell	Great Britain	3:14.682	4 August	WR, OR
Women's team pursuit	Dani King; Laura Trott; Joanna Rowsell	Great Britain	3:14.051	4 August	WR, OR
Men's sprint	Jason Kenny	Great Britain	9.713 s	4 August	OR
Women's sprint	Victoria Pendleton	Great Britain	10.724 s	5 August	OR
