= 2012 UCI Track Cycling World Championships – Men's individual pursuit =

World championship sporting event

Men's individual pursuit at the 2012 UCI Track Cycling World Championships
- Venue: Melbourne Park Multi-Purpose Venue
- Location: Melbourne, Australia
- Dates: 7 April 2012
- Winning time: 4:15.839

Medalists
gold medal	Michael Hepburn	Australia
silver medal	Jack Bobridge	Australia
bronze medal	Westley Gough	New Zealand

The Men's individual pursuit at the 2012 UCI Track Cycling World Championships was held on April 7. Twenty-two athletes participated in the contest. After the qualification, the two fastest riders advanced to the final and the 3rd- and 4th-fastest riders raced for the bronze medal.

== Results ==
=== Qualifying ===
The Qualifying was held at 13:00.

Rank	Name	Nation	Time	Notes
1	Michael Hepburn	Australia	4:13.224	Q
2	Jack Bobridge	Australia	4:14.783	Q
3	Rohan Dennis	Australia	4:16.051	Q
4	Westley Gough	New Zealand	4:17.001	Q
5	Geraint Thomas	Great Britain	4:17.265	
6	Peter Latham	New Zealand	4:18.152	
7	Dominique Cornu	Belgium	4:19.479	
8	Asier Maeztu Billelabeitia	Spain	4:23.334	
9	Kevin Labeque	France	4:23.859	
10	Ingmar De Poortere	Belgium	4:25.931	
11	Valery Kaykov	Russia	4:26.333	
12	Levi Heimans	Netherlands	4:26.569	
13	Casper Folsach	Denmark	4:26.762	
14	Jang Sun-jae	South Korea	4:26.946	
15	Sebastián Mora Vedri	Spain	4:28.094	
16	Stefan Schaefer	Germany	4:31.763	
17	Claudio Imhof	Switzerland	4:33.444	
18	Dias Omirzakov	Kazakhstan	4:35.253	
19	Edison Bravo	Chile	4:35.716	
20	Tim Veldt	Netherlands	4:35.977	
21	Cheung King Lok	Hong Kong	4:37.450	
–	Carlos Linares	Venezuela		DNS

=== Finals ===
The finals were held at 20:35.

==== Small Final ====
Rank	Name	Nation	Time	Notes
3rd place, bronze medalist(s)	Westley Gough	New Zealand	4:16.945	
4	Rohan Dennis	Australia	4:18.594	

==== Final ====
Rank	Name	Nation	Time	Notes
1st place, gold medalist(s)	Michael Hepburn	Australia	4:15.839	
2nd place, silver medalist(s)	Jack Bobridge	Australia	4:16.313	
