= Cycling at the 2014 Commonwealth Games – Men's team pursuit =

Cycling Track – Men's team pursuit at the 2014 Commonwealth Games
- Venue: Sir Chris Hoy Velodrome
- Dates: 24 July 2014
- Competitors: 24 from 6 nations

Medalists
gold medal	Jack Bobridge; Luke Davison; Alex Edmondson; Glenn O´Shea	Australia
silver medal	Bradley Wiggins; Andy Tennant; Ed Clancy; Steven Burke	England
bronze medal	Shane Archbold; Pieter Bulling; Marc Ryan; Dylan Kennett	New Zealand

The Men's team pursuit at the 2014 Commonwealth Games, was part of the cycling programme, which took place on 24 July 2014. Australia, the winners of the 2010 Men's team pursuit, retained their title.

== Qualification ==
Rank	Country	Cyclists	Result
1	Australia	Jack Bobridge; Luke Davison; Alex Edmondson; Glenn O'Shea	3:57.939
2	England	Bradley Wiggins; Andy Tennant; Ed Clancy; Steven Burke	3:59.249
3	New Zealand	Shane Archbold; Pieter Bulling; Marc Ryan; Dylan Kennett	4:00.501
4	Canada	Ed Veal; Remi Pelletier; Aidan Caves; Zach Bell	4:14.481
5	South Africa	Theuns van der Bank; Nolan Hoffman; Kellan Gouveris; Evan Cartens	4:18.194
6	India	Sombir; Manjeet Singh; Amit Kumar; Suresh Bishnoi	4:31.714

== Finals ==
Gold medal match

Rank	Name	Time
1st place, gold medalist(s)	Australia	3:54.851 GR
2nd place, silver medalist(s)	England	4:00.136

Bronze medal match

Rank	Name	Time
3rd place, bronze medalist(s)	New Zealand	
4	Canada	OVL
