= Cycling at the 2008 Summer Olympics – Men's team pursuit =

Men's team pursuit at the Games of the XXIX Olympiad
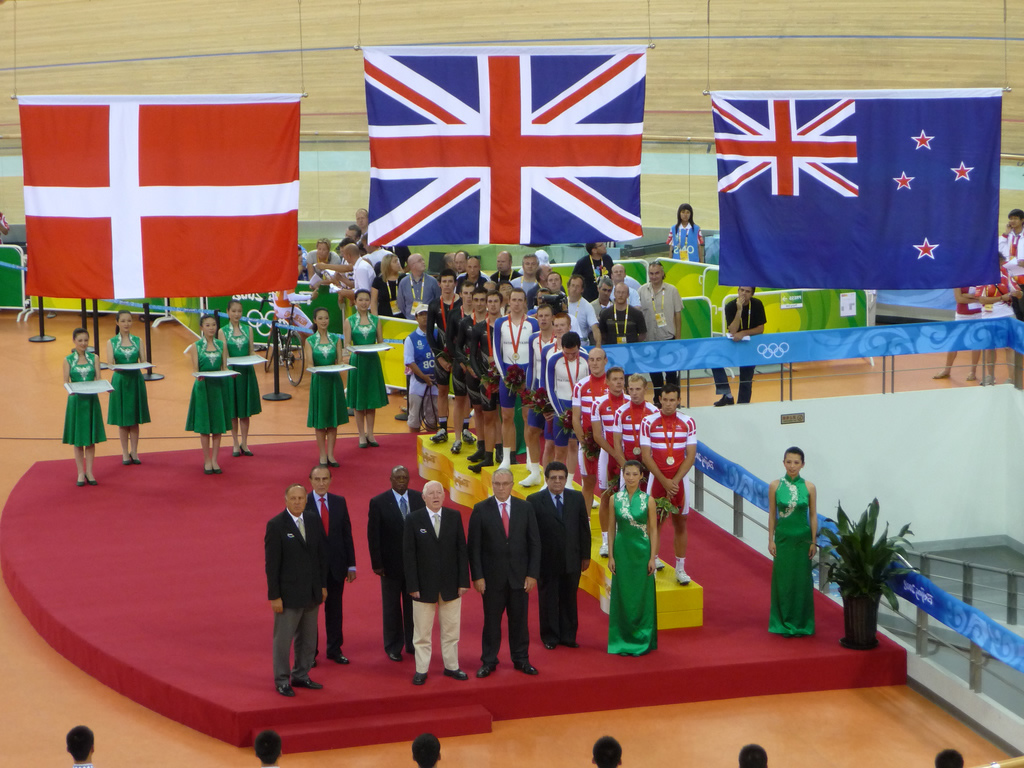
- The medal ceremony
- Venue: Laoshan Velodrome
- Dates: August 17 (opening rounds); August 18 (final)
- Competitors: 44 from 10 nations
- Winning time: 3:53.314 WR

Medalists
1st place, gold medalist(s)		Great Britain; Ed Clancy, Paul Manning, Geraint Thomas, Bradley Wiggins
2nd place, silver medalist(s)		Denmark; Casper Jørgensen, Jens-Erik Madsen, Michael Mørkøv, Alex Rasmussen, Michael Færk Christensen
3rd place, bronze medalist(s)		New Zealand; Sam Bewley, Hayden Roulston, Marc Ryan, Jesse Sergent, Westley Gough

The men's team pursuit at the 2008 Summer Olympics took place between August 17 and 18, at the Laoshan Velodrome.

== Qualification ==
Great Britain automatically qualified a team because of their victory at the 2008 UCI Track Cycling World Championships. They also won the late 2007 World Cup event in Sydney, affording another place based on UCI rankings. This extra place was given to Colombia. No B World Championship was held in this event.

== Competition format ==
The men's team pursuit race consists of a 4 km race between two teams of four cyclists, starting on opposite sides of the track. If one team catches the other, the race is over.

The tournament consisted of an initial qualifying round. The top four teams in the qualifying round remained in contention for the gold medal, the 5th to 8th place teams could compete for a possible bronze, and the remaining teams were eliminated.

In the first round of match competition, teams were seeded into matches based on their times from the qualifying round. The fastest team faced the eighth-fastest, the second-fastest faced the seventh, and so forth. Winners advanced to the finals while losers in each match received a final ranking based on their time in the round. Advancement to the bronze medal final was based solely on time, with the fastest two teams among the six qualifiers who had not advanced to the gold medal final reaching the bronze medal final.

== Schedule ==
All times are China standard time (UTC+8)

Date	Time	Round
Sunday, 17 August 2008	10:00	Qualification
Sunday, 17 August 2008	18:25	Match round
Monday, 18 August 2008	18:15	Final

== Results ==
=== Qualification ===
Rank	Country	Cyclists	Result	Notes
1	Great Britain	Ed Clancy; Paul Manning; Geraint Thomas; Bradley Wiggins	3:57.101	Q
2	New Zealand	Sam Bewley; Westley Gough; Marc Ryan; Jesse Sergent	3:59.277	Q
3	Australia	Jack Bobridge; Mark Jamieson; Bradley McGee; Luke Roberts	4:02.041	Q
4	Denmark	Michael Færk Christensen; Casper Jørgensen; Jens-Erik Madsen; Alex Rasmussen	4:02.191	Q
5	France	Damien Gaudin; Mathieu Ladagnous; Christophe Riblon; Nicolas Rousseau	4:03.679	Q
6	Netherlands	Levi Heimans; Robert Slippens; Wim Stroetinga; Jens Mouris	4:04.846	Q
7	Spain	Sergi Escobar; Asier Maeztu; David Muntaner; Antonio Miguel Parra	4:06.509	Q
8	Russia	Alexei Markov; Alexander Petrovskiy; Alexander Serov; Nikolay Trusov	4:06.518	Q
9	Ukraine	Volodymyr Dyudya; Lyubomyr Polatayko; Maxim Polischuk; Vitaliy Shchedov	4:07.883	
10	Colombia	Juan Esteban Arango; Arles Castro; Juan Pablo Forero; Jairo Pérez	4:11.397	

=== Match round ===
==== Semifinals ====
Qualification rule: Two fastest teams advance to the gold medal match (Q), while the next two to the bronze medal match (q).

Rank	Heat	Country	Cyclists	Result	Notes
1	4	Great Britain	Ed Clancy; Paul Manning; Geraint Thomas; Bradley Wiggins	3:55.202	Q, WR
2	1	Denmark	Casper Jørgensen; Jens-Erik Madsen; Michael Mørkøv; Alex Rasmussen	3:56.831	Q
3	3	New Zealand	Sam Bewley; Marc Ryan; Hayden Roulston; Jesse Sergent	3:57.536	q
4	2	Australia	Jack Bobridge; Graeme Brown; Mark Jamieson; Bradley McGee	3:58.633	q
5	1	France	Damien Gaudin; Mathieu Ladagnous; Christophe Riblon; Nicolas Rousseau	DSQ	
6	2	Netherlands	Levi Heimans; Robert Slippens; Wim Stroetinga; Jens Mouris	LAP	
7	3	Spain	Sergi Escobar; Asier Maeztu; David Muntaner; Antonio Miguel Parra	LAP	
8	4	Russia	Evgeny Kovalev; Alexei Markov; Alexander Petrovskiy; Alexander Serov	LAP	

==== Medal round ====
Bronze medal match

Rank	Country	Cyclists	Result	Notes
3rd place, bronze medalist(s)	New Zealand	Sam Bewley; Marc Ryan; Hayden Roulston; Jesse Sergent	3:57.776	
4	Australia	Jack Bobridge; Graeme Brown; Mark Jamieson; Bradley McGee	3:59.006	

Gold medal match

Rank	Country	Cyclists	Result	Notes
1st place, gold medalist(s)	Great Britain	Ed Clancy; Paul Manning; Geraint Thomas; Bradley Wiggins	3:53.314	WR
2nd place, silver medalist(s)	Denmark	Casper Jørgensen; Jens-Erik Madsen; Michael Mørkøv; Alex Rasmussen	4:00.040	
