= 2012 UCI Track Cycling World Championships – Men's team pursuit =

Rainbow jersey

The Men's team pursuit at the 2012 UCI Track Cycling World Championships was held on April 4. 15 nations of 4 cyclists each participated in the contest. After the qualifying, the fastest 2 teams raced for gold, and 3rd and 4th teams raced for bronze.

== Medalists ==
Gold	Great Britain; Ed Clancy; Steven Burke; Peter Kennaugh; Geraint Thomas; Andrew Tennant
Silver	Australia; Glenn O'Shea; Jack Bobridge; Rohan Dennis; Michael Hepburn
Bronze	New Zealand; Aaron Gate; Sam Bewley; Westley Gough; Marc Ryan

== Results ==
=== Qualifying ===
The qualifying was held at 15:00.

Rank	Name	Nation	Time	Notes
1	Ed Clancy; Peter Kennaugh; Andrew Tennant; Geraint Thomas	Great Britain	3:54.485	Q
2	Glenn O'Shea; Jack Bobridge; Rohan Dennis; Michael Hepburn	Australia	3:54.654	Q
3	Aaron Gate; Sam Bewley; Westley Gough; Marc Ryan	New Zealand	3:59.156	Q
4	Artur Ershov; Evgeny Kovalev; Alexei Markov; Alexander Serov	Russia	3:59.290	Q
5	Pablo Aitor Bernal; Asier Maeztu Billelabeitia; Sebastián Mora Vedri; Albert Torres	Spain	4:01.717	
6	Gijs van Hoecke; Kenny De Ketele; Dominique Cornu; Jonathan Dufrasne	Belgium	4:02.317	
7	Lasse Norman Hansen; Casper Folsach; Rasmus Quaade; Christian Ranneries	Denmark	4:03.237	
8	Peter Schep; Levi Heimans; Arno van der Zwet; Tim Veldt	Netherlands	4:04.489	
9	Nikias Arndt; Henning Bommel; Jakob Steigmiller; Stefan Schaefer	Germany	4:05.078	
10	Jang Sun-jae; Park Keon-Woo; Park Seon-Ho; Park Sung-Baek	South Korea	4:06.970	
11	Silvan Dillier; Claudio Imhof; Loïc Perizzolo; Cyrille Thièry	Switzerland	4:09.200	
12	Luis Sepúlveda; Antonio Cabrera; Gonzalo Miranda; Pablo Seisdedos	Chile	4:10.249	
13	Oleksandr Lobov; Maxim Polischuk; Vitaliy Popkov; Vitaliy Shchedov	Ukraine	4:10.943	
14	Choi Ki Ho; Kwok Ho Ting; Cheung King Lok; Cheung King Wai	Hong Kong	4:11.886	
15	Alexey Lyalko; Dias Omirzakov; Ivan Tsissaruk; Artyom Zakharov	Kazakhstan	4:13.145	

=== Finals ===
The finals were held at 19:20.

==== Small Final ====
Rank	Name	Nation	Time	Notes
3rd place, bronze medalist(s)	Aaron Gate; Sam Bewley; Westley Gough; Marc Ryan	New Zealand	3:57.592	
4	Artur Ershov; Evgeny Kovalev; Alexei Markov; Alexander Serov	Russia	3:59.237	

==== Final ====
Rank	Name	Nation	Time	Notes
1st place, gold medalist(s)	Ed Clancy; Peter Kennaugh; Steven Burke; Geraint Thomas	Great Britain	3:53.295	WR
2nd place, silver medalist(s)	Glenn O'Shea; Jack Bobridge; Rohan Dennis; Michael Hepburn	Australia	3:53.401	
