= Cycling at the 2010 Commonwealth Games – Men's individual pursuit =

The Men's individual pursuit took place at 5 October 2010 at the Indira Gandhi Arena.

== Qualifying ==
Rank	Rider	Time	Average Speed (km/h)
1	Jack Bobridge (AUS)	4:14.845 (CWG)	56.504
2	Jesse Sergent (NZL)	4:16.751	56.085
3	Michael Hepburn (AUS)	4:19.598	55.470
4	Sam Bewley (NZL)	4:19.612	55.467
5	Peter Latham (NZL)	4:25.534	54.230
6	Martyn Irvine (NIR)	4:28.803	53.570
7	Sam Harrison (WAL)	4:33.341	52.681
8	George Atkins (ENG)	4:34.490	52.460
9	Mark Christian (IOM)	4:35.052	52.353
10	Erick Rowsell (ENG)	4:39.710	51.481
11	Mohammad Akmal Amrun (MAS)	4:41.754	51.108
12	Sombir (IND)	4:54.966	48.819
13	Dayala Ram Saran (IND)	5:01.972	47.686
14	Vinod Malik (IND)	5:02.085	47.668

== Finals ==
Final

Rank	Name	Time
1st place, gold medalist(s)	Jack Bobridge (AUS)	4:17.495
2nd place, silver medalist(s)	Jesse Sergent (NZL)	4:17.893

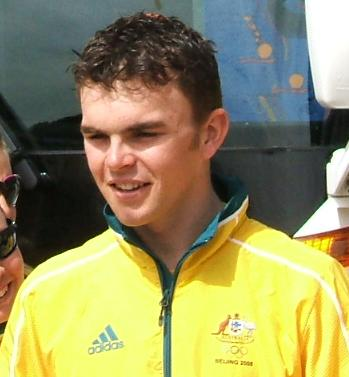
Jack Bobridge

Bronze medal match

Rank	Name	Time
3rd place, bronze medalist(s)	Michael Hepburn (AUS)	
4	Sam Bewley (NZL)	OVL
