= Antonio Miguel Parra =

Spanish cyclist

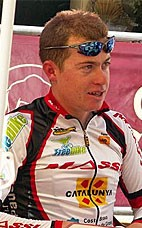
- Antoni Miguel Parra

Personal information
- Full name: Antonio Miguel Parra
- Born: 26 December 1982 (age 43) Palafrugell, Spain
- Height: 1.81 m (5 ft 11 in)
- Weight: 76 kg (168 lb)

Cycling career
- Sport: Cycling
- Discipline: Track
- Role: Rider
- Rider type: Pursuit

Professional teams
- 2005: Catalunya–Angel Mir
- 2006: Massi

Major wins
- Spanish Track Cycling Championships (Madison) (2004)

Antonio Miguel Parra (born 26 December 1982) is a retired Spanish professional track cyclist. He claimed the men's madison title at the 2004 Spanish Track Cycling Championships in Palma de Mallorca, and later represented his nation Spain at the 2008 Summer Olympics. During his sporting career, Parra also raced for the Catalunya–Angel Mir and Massi pro cycling teams.

Parra qualified for the Spanish squad in the men's team pursuit at the 2008 Summer Olympics in Beijing based on the nation's selection process from the UCI Track World Rankings. He delivered the Spanish foursome of Sergi Escobar, Asier Maeztu, and David Muntaner a seventh-place time of 4:07.883 in the prelims before his team was later relegated and overlapped to New Zealand in the third match round.

== Career highlights ==
2003
1st Stage 3, Cinturó de l'Empordá, Vilabertran (ESP)
2004
1st Spanish Track Cycling Championships (Madison), Palma de Mallorca (ESP)
1st Stage 1, Vuelta a Alicante, Torrevieja (ESP)
3rd Stage 1, Vuelta Ciclista Internacional a Extremadura, Badajoz (ESP)
3rd Stage 3, Cinturó de l'Empordá, Empuriabrava (ESP)
2006
1st Stage 3, Vuelta Ciclista Internacional a Extremadura, Badajoz (ESP)
2008
7th Olympic Games (Team pursuit), Beijing (CHN)
2009
2nd Stage 7, Vuelta Ciclista a Chiapas, Tuxtla Gutiérrez (MEX)
