= Cycling at the 2010 Commonwealth Games – Men's team pursuit =

Cycling Track – Men's team pursuit at the 2010 Commonwealth Games
- Venue: Indira Gandhi Arena
- Dates: 6 October (qualifying); 7 October (finals)
- Competitors: 21 from 5 nations
- Winning time: 3:55.421

Medalists
gold medal	Jack Bobridge; Michael Hepburn; Cameron Meyer; Dale Parker; Michael Freiberg	Australia
silver medal	Sam Bewley; Westley Gough; Marc Ryan; Jesse Sergent	New Zealand
bronze medal	Sean Downey; Martyn Irvine; Philip Lavery; David McCann	Northern Ireland

The Men's team pursuit at the 2010 Commonwealth Games took place on 6 and 7 October 2010 at the Indira Gandhi Arena.

== Qualifying ==
The two fastest teams advance to the gold medal final. The next two fastest teams advance to the bronze medal final.

Rank	Nation	Time	Behind	Notes
1	Australia; Jack Bobridge; Michael Freiberg; Michael Hepburn; Dale Parker	4:00.285	–	QG
2	New Zealand; Sam Bewley; Westley Gough; Marc Ryan; Jesse Sergent	4:03.443	+3.158	QG
3	Northern Ireland; Sean Downey; Martyn Irvine; Philip Lavery; David McCann	4:22.669	+22.384	QB
4	India; Vinod Malik; Dayala Saran; Satbir Singh; Sombir	4:31.259	+30.974	QB
	Wales; Sam Harrison; Jon Mould; Luke Rowe; Rhys Lloyd	DSQ		

== Finals ==
The finals was held on 7 October at 14:15.

Rank	Nation	Time	Behind	Notes
Bronze medal final
3rd place, bronze medalist(s)	Northern Ireland; Sean Downey; Martyn Irvine; Philip Lavery; David McCann			
4	India; Vinod Malik; Dayala Saran; Satbir Singh; Sombir	OVL		
Gold medal final
1st place, gold medalist(s)	Australia; Jack Bobridge; Michael Hepburn; Cameron Meyer; Dale Parker	3:55.421		GR
2nd place, silver medalist(s)	New Zealand; Sam Bewley; Westley Gough; Marc Ryan; Jesse Sergent	OVL		
