= 2011 UCI Track Cycling World Championships – Men's individual pursuit =

Men's individual pursuit at the 2011 UCI Track Cycling World Championships
- Venue: Omnisport Apeldoorn
- Location: Apeldoorn, Netherlands
- Dates: 24 March 2011
- Winning time: 4:21.141

Medalists
| gold medal | Jack Bobridge | Australia |
| silver medal | Jesse Sergent | New Zealand |
| bronze medal | Michael Hepburn | Australia |

The Men's individual pursuit at the 2011 UCI Track Cycling World Championships was held on March 24. Twenty-two athletes participated in the contest. After the qualification, the two fastest riders advanced to the final and the 3rd- and 4th-fastest riders raced for the bronze medal.

== Results ==
=== Qualifying ===
The Qualifying was held at 13:00.

| Rank | Name | Nation | Time | Notes |
|---|---|---|---|---|
| 1 | Jack Bobridge | Australia | 4:17.465 | Q |
| 2 | Jesse Sergent | New Zealand | 4:21.481 | Q |
| 3 | Michael Hepburn | Australia | 4:22.624 | q |
| 4 | Rohan Dennis | Australia | 4:22.667 | q |
| 5 | Victor Manakov | Russia | 4:26.348 | |
| 6 | Dominique Cornu | Belgium | 4:27.756 | |
| 7 | Nikias Arndt | Germany | 4:29.033 | |
| 8 | Asier Maeztu Billelabeitia | Spain | 4:29.121 | |
| 9 | Julien Morice | France | 4:29.509 | |
| 10 | Jenning Huizenga | Netherlands | 4:30.687 | |
| 11 | Sergi Escobar | Spain | 4:31.352 | |
| 12 | Arles Castro | Colombia | 4:31.777 | |
| 13 | Vitaliy Shchedov | Ukraine | 4:34.615 | |
| 14 | Levi Heimans | Netherlands | 4:34.686 | |
| 15 | Claudio Imhof | Switzerland | 4:36.018 | |
| 16 | Giairo Ermeti | Italy | 4:36.517 | |
| 17 | Cheung King Lok | Hong Kong | 4:37.457 | |
| 18 | Kilian Moser | Switzerland | 4:37.604 | |
| 19 | Félix Barón | Colombia | 4:39.517 | |
| 20 | Roman Dronin | Uzbekistan | 4:48.950 | |
| 21 | Berik Kupeshov | Kazakhstan | 4:50.282 | |
| – | Sam Harrison | United Kingdom | DNS | |

=== Finals ===
The final was held at 21:30.

| Rank | Name | Nation | Time |
|---|---|---|---|
Gold Medal Race
| 1st place, gold medalist(s) | Jack Bobridge | Australia | 4:21.141 |
| 2nd place, silver medalist(s) | Jesse Sergent | New Zealand | 4:23.865 |
Bronze Medal Race
| 3rd place, bronze medalist(s) | Michael Hepburn | Australia | 4:22.553 |
| 4 | Rohan Dennis | Australia | 4:24.087 |

== See also ==
- 2011 UCI Para-cycling Track World Championships – Men's individual pursuit
