= Jesse Sergent =

New Zealand racing cyclist

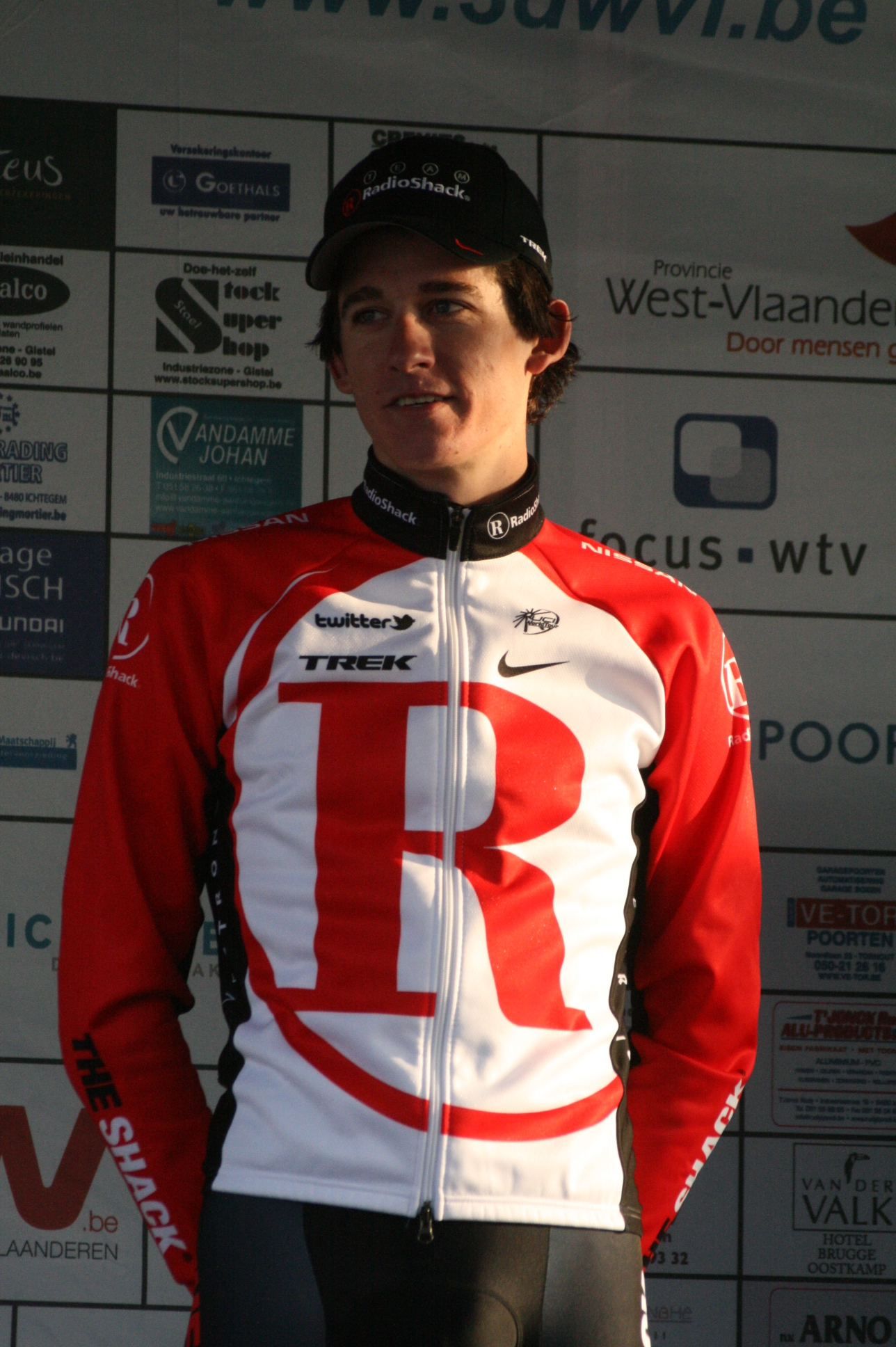
- Sergent at the 2011 Driedaagse van West-Vlaanderen, a race he would win overall.

Personal information
- Full name: Jesse Sergent
- Nickname: Goose
- Born: 8 July 1988 (age 38) Feilding, New Zealand
- Height: 1.89 m (6 ft 2 in)
- Weight: 77 kg (170 lb)

Cycling career
- Sport: Cycling
- Current team: Retired
- Discipline: Road
- Role: Rider
- Rider type: Time Trialist; Classics specialist

Amateur teams
- 2009–2010: Trek–Livestrong
- 2010: Team RadioShack (stagiaire)

Professional teams
- 2011: Team RadioShack
- 2012–2015: RadioShack–Nissan
- 2016: AG2R La Mondiale

Major wins
- One-day races and Classics Driedaagse van West-Vlaanderen (2011)
Medal record
Representing New Zealand
Men's track cycling
Olympic Games
Bronze medal – third place	2008 Beijing	Team pursuit
Bronze medal – third place	2012 London	Team pursuit
World Championships
Silver medal – second place	2010 Ballerup	Individual Pursuit
Silver medal – second place	2011 Apeldoorn	Individual Pursuit
Bronze medal – third place	2009 Pruszków	Team Pursuit
Bronze medal – third place	2010 Ballerup	Team Pursuit
Commonwealth Games
Silver medal – second place	2010 Delhi	Individual Pursuit
Silver medal – second place	2010 Delhi	team Pursuit

Jesse Sergent (born 8 July 1988) is a retired New Zealand racing cyclist who rode professionally between 2011 and 2016 for Team RadioShack, Trek Factory Racing and AG2R La Mondiale.

== Career ==
Born in Feilding, Sergent won a bronze medal at the 2008 Summer Olympics in Beijing, as part of the New Zealand team in team pursuit, together with Sam Bewley, Hayden Roulston, Westley Gough and Marc Ryan.

On 10 November 2008, it was announced that Sergent had signed with Trek–Livestrong's under-23 development team, for 2009 and 2010. Sergent became a stagiaire with Team RadioShack for the last part of the 2010 season. He then signed a professional contract for 2011 with Team RadioShack. He represented New-Zealand at the 2010 Commonwealth Games held in Delhi, India. Sergent won a silver medal in the Individual Pursuit and silver in the Team Pursuit. Sergent, with several other riders, joined the former Leopard Trek team to form RadioShack–Nissan, ahead of the 2012 season.

Sergent switched to track cycling for the 2012 London Olympics, where he and his teammates (Sam Bewley, Marc Ryan, Westley Gough) made themselves double Olympic bronze medalists. Aaron Gate was the only rider added to the team.

In 2013, Sergent rode for RadioShack–Leopard. He started the racing season with New Zealand elite road nations where he placed third.

In 2014, Sergent continued to ride for RadioShack–Leopard – renamed Trek Factory Racing. For the 2014 season Sergent provided support to Fabian Cancellara. Sergent also rode in the Glasgow Commonwealth Games individual road time trial and road race.

Sergent was hit by a neutral service car during the 2015 Tour of Flanders, an accident which kept him out of the sport for three months and resulted in him having three operations. He subsequently signed a two-year deal with AG2R La Mondiale from the start of the 2016 season. However, in July 2016, Sergent retired from professional cycling at the age of 28.

== Major results ==
2005
1st Time trial, Oceania Junior Road Championships
2006
1st Time trial, National Junior Road Championships
2008
3rd Team pursuit, Olympic Games
2009
1st Stage 1 (TTT) Tour of Southland
3rd Team pursuit, UCI Track World Championships
2010
1st Stage 3 (ITT) Tour of the Gila
1st Prologue Cascade Cycling Classic
UCI Track World Championships

2nd Individual pursuit
3rd Team pursuit

Commonwealth Games

2nd Individual pursuit
2nd Team pursuit
9th Time trial

3rd Time trial, National Under-23 Road Championships
3rd Overall Olympia's Tour
2011
1st Overall Driedaagse van West-Vlaanderen

1st Prologue

1st Overall Tour du Poitou-Charentes

1st Stage 4 (ITT)

1st Stage 4 (ITT) Eneco Tour
2nd Individual pursuit, UCI Track World Championships
2nd Time trial, National Road Championships
2012
2nd Overall Driedaagse van West-Vlaanderen
3rd Team pursuit, Olympic Games
3rd Time trial, National Road Championships
6th Overall Three Days of De Panne
2013
7th Overall Volta ao Algarve
2014
1st Stage 5 Tour of Austria
5th Time trial, Commonwealth Games
8th Overall Driedaagse van West-Vlaanderen
2015
1st Stage 1 (TTT) Tour of Alberta
3rd Overall Driedaagse van West-Vlaanderen
