= 2016 Cadel Evans Great Ocean Road Race =

Race details
- Dates: January 31, 2016
- Stages: 1
- Distance: 174 km (108 mi)
- Winning time: 4h 04' 59"

Results
	Winner	Peter Kennaugh (GBR)	(Team Sky)
	Second	Leigh Howard (AUS)	(IAM Cycling)
	Third	Niccolò Bonifazio (ITA)	(Trek–Segafredo)

The 2016 Cadel Evans Great Ocean Road Race was a road cycling one-day classic that took place on 31 January 2016 in Victoria, Australia. The race, which covered a distance of 174 kilometres (108 mi), started and finished in Geelong, where it used a circuit similar to that used in the 2010 world championships road race. It was the second edition of the Cadel Evans Great Ocean Road Race.

The race was won in a solo attack by Peter Kennaugh (Team Sky). He attacked from a small group on the final climb and held off the chasers for the 12 kilometres (7.5 mi) to the finish line. He finished six seconds ahead of a group of 19 riders: the sprint for second was won by Leigh Howard (IAM Cycling) with Niccolò Bonifazio (Trek–Segafredo) third.

== Result ==
Result (top 10)
Rank	Rider	Team	Time
1	Peter Kennaugh (GBR)	Team Sky	4h 04' 59"
2	Leigh Howard (AUS)	IAM Cycling	+ 6"
3	Niccolò Bonifazio (ITA)	Trek–Segafredo	+ 6"
4	Pim Ligthart (NED)	Lotto–Soudal	+ 6"
5	Simon Gerrans (AUS)	Orica–GreenEDGE	+ 6"
6	Nathan Haas (AUS)	Team Dimension Data	+ 6"
7	Alexey Tsatevich (RUS)	Team Katusha	+ 6"
8	Ben Swift (GBR)	Team Sky	+ 6"
9	Enrico Battaglin (ITA)	LottoNL–Jumbo	+ 6"
10	Dion Smith (NZL)	ONE Pro Cycling	+ 6"
