= Jack Bobridge =

Australian cyclist (born 1989)

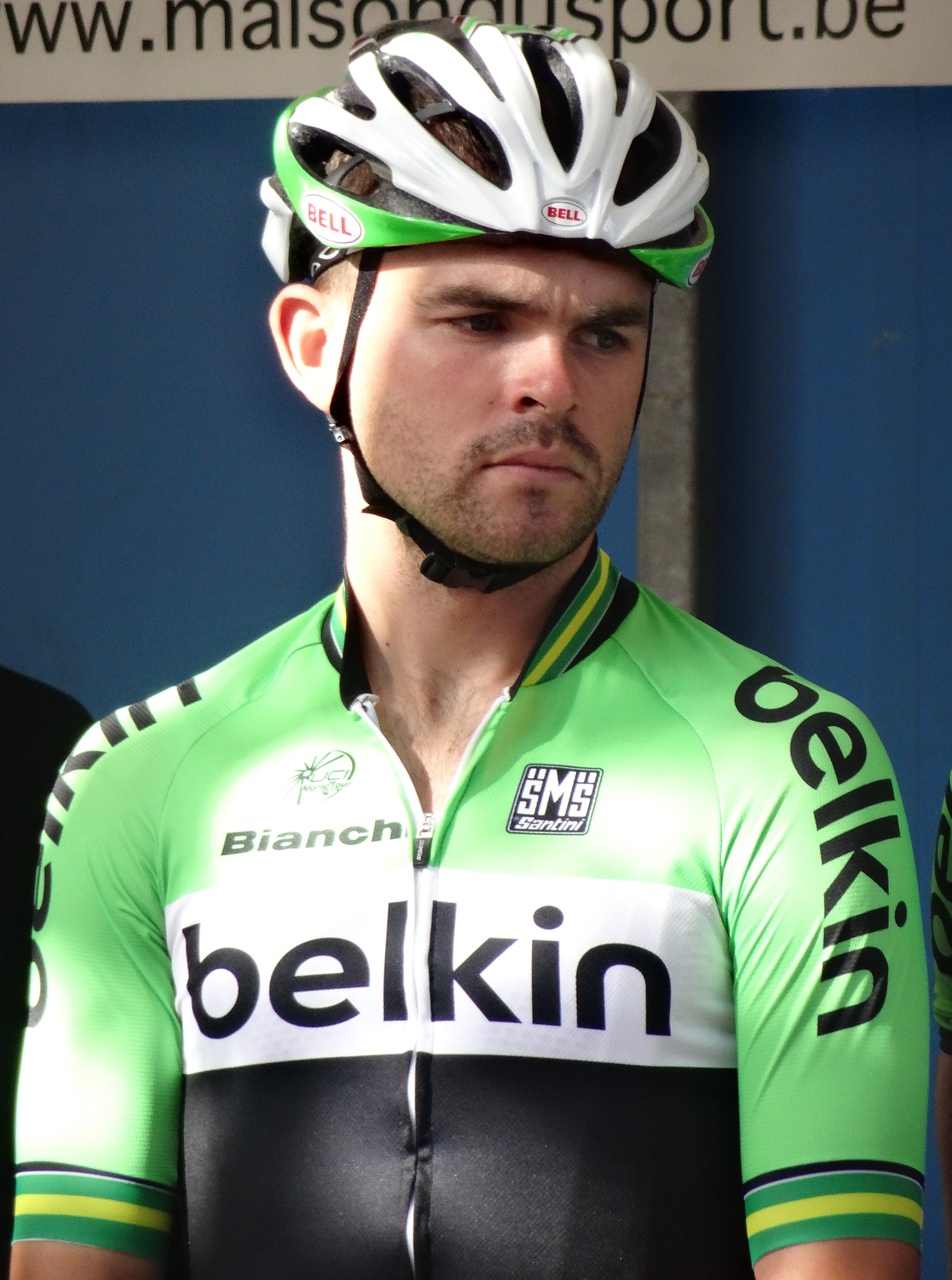
- Bobridge in 2014

Personal information
- Full name: Jack Bobridge
- Nickname: Bobby
- Born: 13 July 1989 (age 37) Adelaide, South Australia, Australia
- Height: 180 cm (5 ft 11 in)
- Weight: 65 kg (143 lb)

Cycling career
- Sport: Cycling
- Current team: Retired
- Disciplines: Road; Track
- Role: Rider
- Rider type: Endurance (track)

Amateur teams
- 2004–2007: CSC Team O'Grady
- 2008–2009: Southaustralia.com–AIS

Professional teams
- 2010–2011: Garmin–Transitions
- 2012: GreenEDGE
- 2013–2014: Blanco Pro Cycling
- 2015: Team Budget Forklifts
- 2016: Trek–Segafredo

Major wins
- One-day races and Classics National Road Race Championships (2011, 2016)
Medal record
Representing Australia
Men's road bicycle racing
World Championships
Gold medal – first place	2009 Mendrisio	Under-23 time trial
Men's track cycling
Olympic Games
Silver medal – second place	2012 London	Team pursuit
Silver medal – second place	2016 Rio de Janeiro	Team pursuit
World Championships
Gold medal – first place	2010 Ballerup	Team pursuit
Gold medal – first place	2011 Apeldoorn	Team pursuit
Gold medal – first place	2011 Apeldoorn	Individual pursuit
Silver medal – second place	2009 Pruszków	Individual pursuit
Silver medal – second place	2009 Pruszków	Team pursuit
Silver medal – second place	2012 Melbourne	Individual pursuit
Silver medal – second place	2012 Melbourne	Team pursuit
Silver medal – second place	2015 Yvelines	Individual pursuit
Bronze medal – third place	2010 Ballerup	Individual pursuit
Bronze medal – third place	2015 Yvelines	Team pursuit
Commonwealth Games
Gold medal – first place	2010 Delhi	Individual pursuit
Gold medal – first place	2010 Delhi	Team pursuit
Gold medal – first place	2014 Glasgow	Team pursuit
Gold medal – first place	2014 Glasgow	Individual pursuit

Jack Bobridge (born 13 July 1989) is an Australian former professional racing cyclist, who rode professionally between 2010 and 2016.

In 2019 he was convicted of drug dealing and sentenced to a four-year prison term. He admitted to using banned recreational drugs during his racing career, noting that he used cocaine in training leading up to major cycling events, including the Olympics.

== Career ==
Bobridge's career combined both track and road cycling.

In 2008, he was part of the Australian men's pursuit team that finished in fourth place at the Olympics, along with Graeme Brown, Mark Jamieson, Luke Roberts and Brad McGee.

In May 2009, Bobridge signed with Garmin–Slipstream, with his contract starting on 1 January 2010 and had been contracted to race with the team until 2012. He left the team at the end of 2011, and joined GreenEDGE for the 2012 season.

In September 2009 he won the under-23 time trial at the UCI Road World Championships. In January 2011 he became the Australian National Road Race Champion with a daring solo breakaway. On 2 February 2011, he set a new world record for the track 4k individual pursuit. Bobridge was an Australian Institute of Sport scholarship holder.

At the 2012 Summer Olympics, he was part of the Australian team that won the silver medal in the men's team pursuit, with Glenn O'Shea, Rohan Dennis and Michael Hepburn.

Bobridge left Orica–GreenEDGE at the end of the 2012 season, and joined Blanco Pro Cycling on a two-year contract from the 2013 season onwards.

Bobridge won two gold medals at the 2014 Commonwealth Games, one in the men's team pursuit with Luke Davison, Alex Edmondson and Glenn O'Shea, where Australia set a new Games record in the final, and in the men's individual pursuit.

In November 2014 Bobridge was announced as part of the Team Budget Forklifts line-up for 2015 alongside fellow members of the Australian endurance track squad Luke Davison, Glenn O'Shea, Scott Sunderland and Mitchel Mulhearn, riding a domestic programme with a focus on achieving success on the track at the 2016 Summer Olympics.

Bobridge won the opening stage of the 2015 Tour Down Under. He lost the overall lead on stage three but finished the race with the King of the Mountains jersey. On 31 January 2015 Bobridge attempted to break the world hour record in Melbourne. He rode 51.3 kilometres falling short of the record of 51.852 kilometres. However he did break Brad McGee's Australian national hour record of 50.3 kilometres which had stood since 2000. In September 2015 it was announced that Bobridge would return to the UCI WorldTour peloton in 2016, signing a one-year contract with Trek Factory Racing.

In 2016, Bobridge won his second Olympic silver medal, again in the men's team pursuit, this time with Alex Edmondson, Michael Hepburn, Sam Welsford and Callum Scotson.

Bobridge announced his retirement from cycling in November 2016. His retirement was due to the effects of rheumatoid arthritis which he was first diagnosed with in 2010.

The Jack Bobridge Track, a cycling and walking trail from his hometown of Gawler into the Barossa Valley was named for Bobridge when it was built in 2014, however the Barossa Council was concerned that this sent the wrong message to young people after he was convicted of using and selling drugs in 2019. In July 2019, the council resolved to remove Bobridge's name and rename the track to the Barossa Trail, a name already used for the northern and eastern extension.

== Legal issues ==
In September 2017, Bobridge was charged with selling trafficable quantities of recreational drugs. In May 2019, during a court hearing concerning his case, he admitted to using recreational drugs, such as cocaine and ecstasy, during his active career. He claimed that he took them ahead of some races, but that they would be out of his body by race day. He denied the charges brought against him that he trafficked ecstasy. On 5 July 2019, he was sentenced to four years and six months in prison, being found guilty for four charges of drug dealing.

He was released from prison after two and a half years, and, as of February 2025, was living in Perth, working as a bricklayer, and also operating a mobile coffee van.

== Major results ==
=== Track ===
2006
1st Team pursuit, UCI Junior Track World Championships
2007
1st Team pursuit, UCI Junior Track World Championships
National Track Championships

1st Team pursuit
1st Madison

2008
1st Team pursuit, 2007–08 UCI Track Cycling World Cup Classics, Los Angeles
2009
Oceania Track Championships

1st Individual pursuit
1st Team pursuit

1st Individual pursuit, National Track Championships
2010
Commonwealth Games

1st Individual pursuit
1st Team pursuit

UCI Track World Championships

1st Team pursuit
3rd Individual pursuit

2011
UCI Track World Championships

1st Team pursuit
1st Individual pursuit

1st Overall, Individual pursuit, 2010–11 UCI Track Cycling World Ranking
2012
UCI Track World Championships

2nd Team pursuit
2nd Individual pursuit

2nd Team pursuit, Olympic Games
2015
2nd Individual pursuit, UCI Track World Championships
2016
2nd Team pursuit, Olympic Games

=== Road ===
2007
3rd Overall Tour of the Murray River
4th Time trial, UCI Juniors World Championships
2008
8th Overall Tour de Berlin
2009
1st Time trial, UCI Under-23 Road World Championships
National Under-23 Road Championships

1st Road race
1st Time trial

1st Eschborn–Frankfurt City Loop U23
3rd Overall Thüringen Rundfahrt der U23

1st Stage 2 & 5 (ITT)

7th Overall Tour of Japan

1st Stage 4 & 6

2010
1st Stage 5 Eneco Tour
7th Overall Delta Tour Zeeland
2011
National Road Championships

1st Road race
2nd Time trial

2nd Overall Herald Sun Tour
5th Time trial, UCI Road World Championships
2014
5th Road race, National Road Championships
2015
Tour Down Under

1st Mountains classification
1st Stage 1

3rd Time trial, National Road Championships
2016
1st Road race, National Road Championships
4th Overall Herald Sun Tour

==== Grand Tour general classification results timeline ====
Grand Tour	2010	2011	2012	2013	2014	2015	2016
Giro d'Italia	DNF	—	DNF	DNF	—	—	156
Tour de France	Did not contest during his career						
Vuelta a España	Did not contest during his career						

Legend
—	Did not compete
DNF	Did not finish
