= Kevin Ríos =

Colombian cyclist (born 1993)

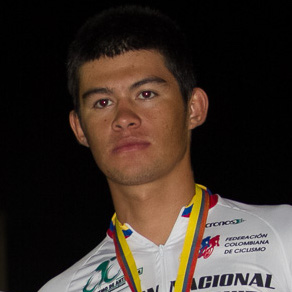

Personal information
- Full name: Kevin Daniel Rios Quintana
- Born: 24 January 1993 (age 33) Rionegro, Antioquia, Colombia
- Height: 1.83 m (6 ft 0 in)
- Weight: 73 kg (161 lb)

Cycling career
- Sport: Cycling
- Discipline: Track
- Role: Rider
- Rider type: Pursuit

Amateur team
- 2011: Coldeportes

Kevin Daniel Ríos Quintana (born January 24, 1993, in Rionegro, Antioquia) is a Colombian amateur track cyclist. He represented his nation Colombia, as a member of the men's national pursuit team, at the 2012 Summer Olympics, and also, claimed the men's junior trophy in road cycling at the 2011 Vuelta del Porvenir de Colombia.

Rios qualified for the Colombian squad in the men's team pursuit at the 2012 Summer Olympics in London based on the nation's selection process from the UCI Track World Rankings. He and his teammates Edwin Ávila, Arles Castro, and Weimar Roldán recorded an eighth-place time of 4:04.772 in the classification final match, losing only to the Dutch squad by more than two tenths of a second.
