= Peter Kennaugh =

British road bicycle racer

Peter Kennaugh MBE
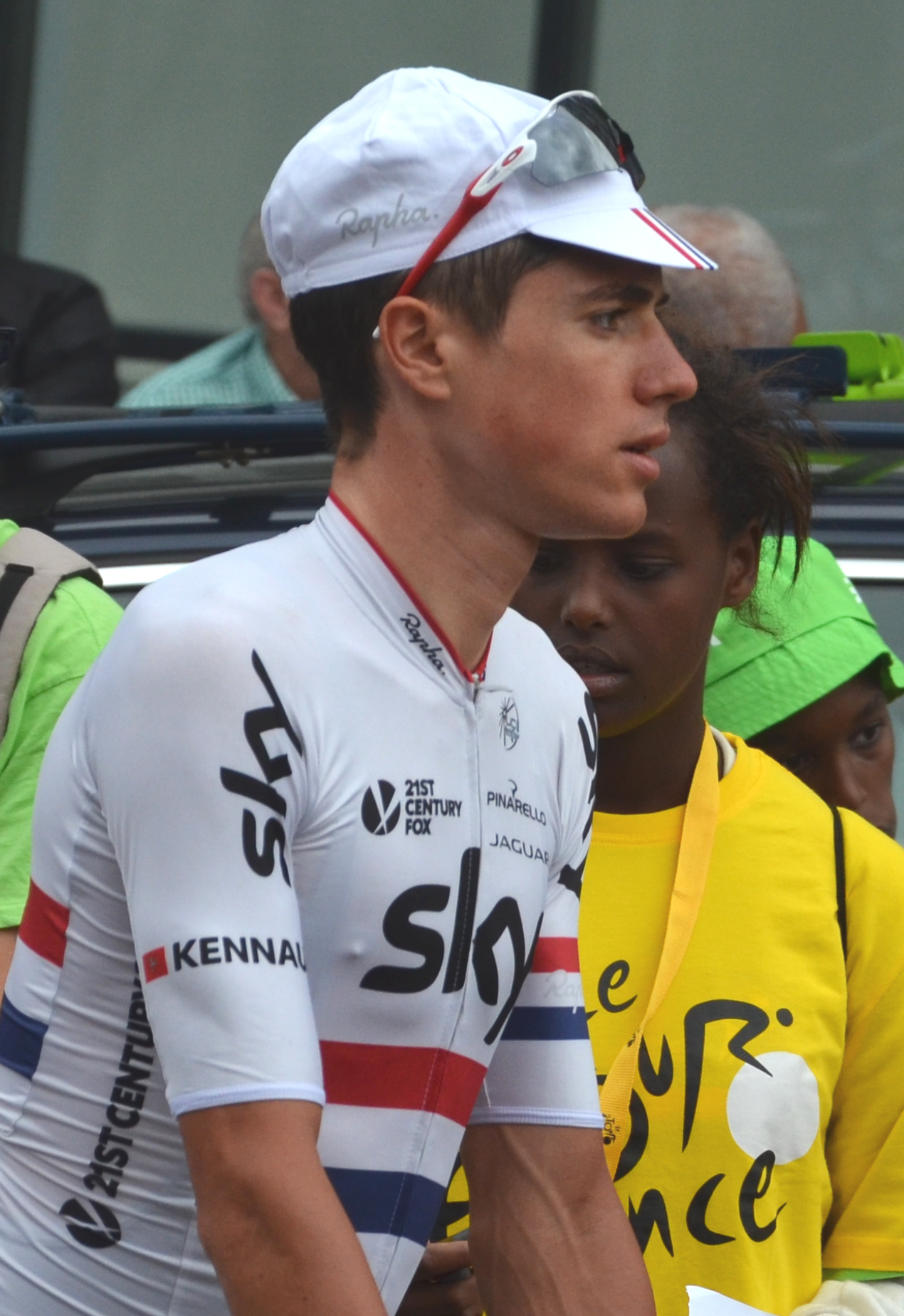
- Kennaugh at the 2015 Tour de France

Personal information
- Full name: Peter Robert Kennaugh
- Nickname: Pete
- Born: 15 June 1989 (age 37) Douglas, Isle of Man
- Height: 1.73 m (5 ft 8 in)
- Weight: 62 kg (137 lb; 9.8 st)

Cycling career
- Sport: Cycling
- Current team: Retired
- Disciplines: Road; Track
- Role: Rider
- Rider type: All-rounder (road); Pursuitist (track)

Amateur teams
- 2007: Pinarello RT
- 2008: Glendene
- 2009: 100% Me

Professional teams
- 2010–2017: Team Sky
- 2018–2019: Bora–Hansgrohe

Major wins
- Road Grand Tours Vuelta a España 1 TTT stage (2016) Stage races Tour of Austria (2014) One-day races and Classics National Road Race Championships (2014, 2015) Great Ocean Road Race (2016) Track Olympic Games Team pursuit (2012) World Championships Team pursuit 2012)
Medal record
Representing Great Britain
Men's track cycling
Olympic Games
Gold medal – first place	2012 London	Team pursuit
World Championships
Gold medal – first place	2012 Melbourne	Team pursuit
Bronze medal – third place	2011 Apeldoorn	Team pursuit
European Elite Championships
Gold medal – first place	2011 Apeldoorn	Team pursuit
Representing Isle of Man
Men's track cycling
Commonwealth Games
Silver medal – second place	2014 Glasgow	Points race

Peter Robert Kennaugh MBE (born 15 June 1989) is a Manx former professional racing cyclist, who rode professionally between 2010 and 2019 for Team Sky and Bora–Hansgrohe. In 2012 he won the gold medal as part of the Great Britain Team Pursuit team at the 2012 Summer Olympics, becoming the first Manxman in 100 years to win gold. On 5 April 2019, he announced that he was taking an indefinite break from professional cycling to focus on his mental health.

== Career ==
=== Early life and career ===
Born in Douglas, Isle of Man, Peter's younger brother Tim, and their father are also cyclists. Peter's mother Jackie also cycled and formerly held the Isle of Man's 10-mile time trial record. He began cycling competitively in BMX at the age of 6. Kennaugh attended school at St Ninian's.

He became a member of British Cycling's Olympic Academy in 2008, moving with the rest of the squad to live in Tuscany, Italy. In 2008 he came second in the senior national road race championships thus becoming the British under 23 champion. In February 2009 he became the British madison champion partnering Mark Christian.

On 9 September 2009, it was announced that Kennaugh would turn professional in 2010, riding for the new British professional Team Sky. He was described by Cycling Weekly as "the most talented youngster to roll off the Isle of Man production line since his friend and star sprinter Mark Cavendish".

=== Team Sky (2010–17) ===
==== 2010 ====
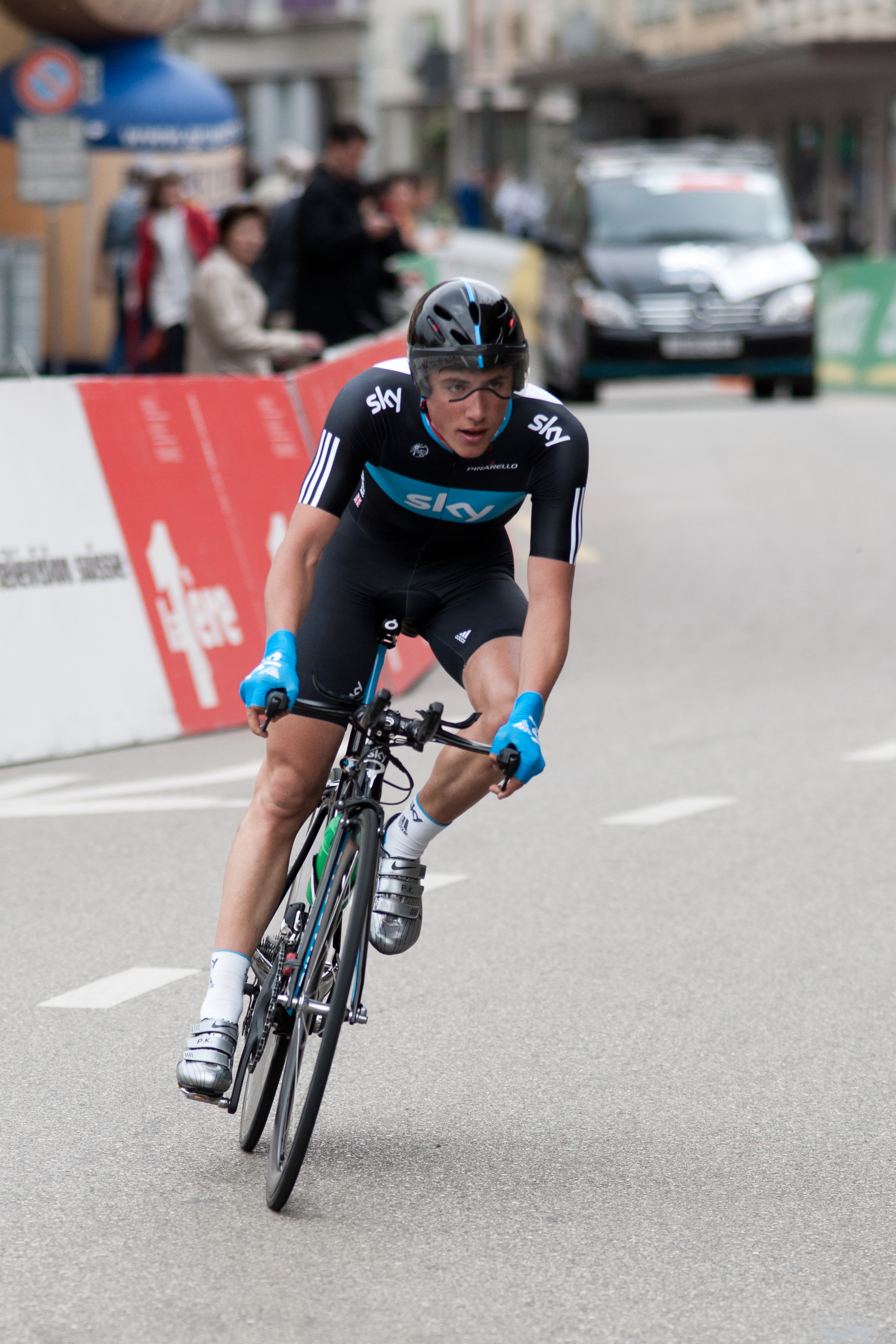
Kennaugh at the 2010 Tour de Romandie

In 2010, he focused on track cycling, winning the individual pursuit and scratch race at the national track championships. He finished second to Sky teammate Geraint Thomas in the national road race championships. Kennaugh made his grand tour debut in the Vuelta a España, but Sky withdrew following the death of soigneur Txema Gonzalez.

==== 2011 ====
In 2011, Kennaugh was a last minute replacement for Serge Pauwels in the Giro d'Italia, and finished 86th in his first Giro. Kennaugh finished third overall in the Route du Sud, but was not selected for the 2011 Tour de France. He came in third behind teammates Bradley Wiggins and Geraint Thomas in the national road race championships. In August, he finished fifth overall in the Tour de Pologne.

==== 2012 ====
In 2012, he began focusing on track cycling. He was part of the four-man Great Britain pursuit team that set a new world record time of 3:53.295 seconds to win gold in the track world championships on 4 April 2012 in Melbourne. That achievement however was bettered on 3 August when he formed part of the Team GB pursuit team alongside Ed Clancy, Geraint Thomas, Steven Burke, that not only took Gold at the Summer Olympics but, with a time of 3:51.659, shattered their own world record that they had set in qualifying. Kennaugh was the first Manxman to win an Olympic gold since 1912.

Kennaugh was appointed Member of the Order of the British Empire (MBE) in the 2013 New Year Honours for services to cycling.

==== 2013 ====
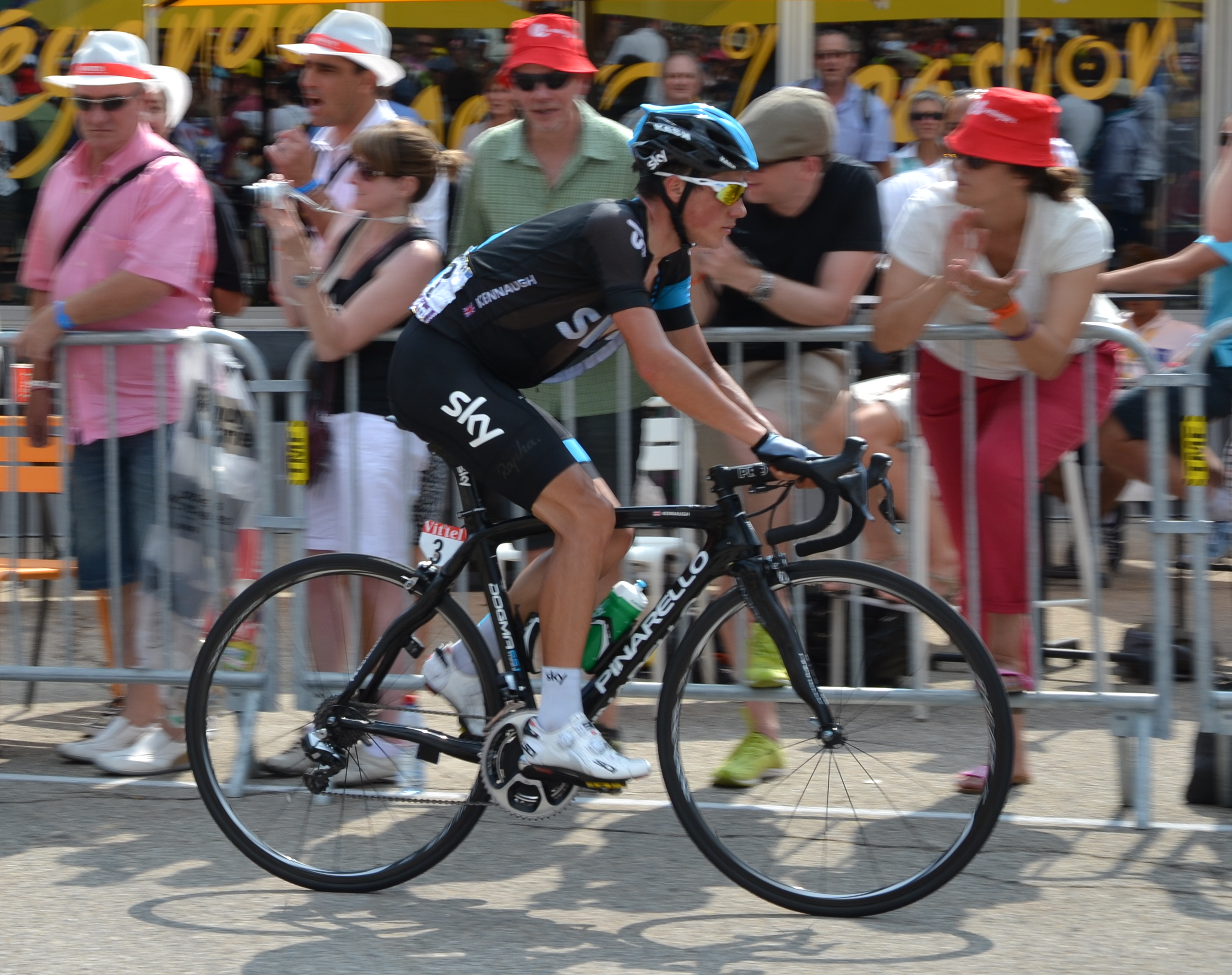
Kennaugh on stage fifteen of the 2013 Tour de France

Kennaugh focused fully on the road in 2013. He played a supporting role in Chris Froome's overall victory at the Tour of Oman in February. Kennaugh was part of the Sky team that won the team time trial at the Giro del Trentino in April, but he was not selected to ride the Giro d'Italia. Instead, Kennaugh won the Lincoln Grand Prix before playing a key role as a mountain domestique as Froome and Richie Porte took a 1–2 overall in the Critérium du Dauphiné in June. He was selected to ride the Tour de France for the first time. On Stage 8, Kennaugh played a key role in Chris Froome's stage victory by helping to bring back a dangerous move by Nairo Quintana on the Port de Pailhères, the subsequent descent and beginning of the final climb to Ax 3 Domaines. However, on the following stage, Kennaugh was involved in a dramatic crash as Ryder Hesjedal, a Garmin–Sharp rider, knocked into him, sending him down a ravine and into vegetation next to the road. Although Kennaugh was not badly injured, the time lost meant he was unable to follow several subsequent attacks as Froome was left completely isolated.

==== 2014 ====
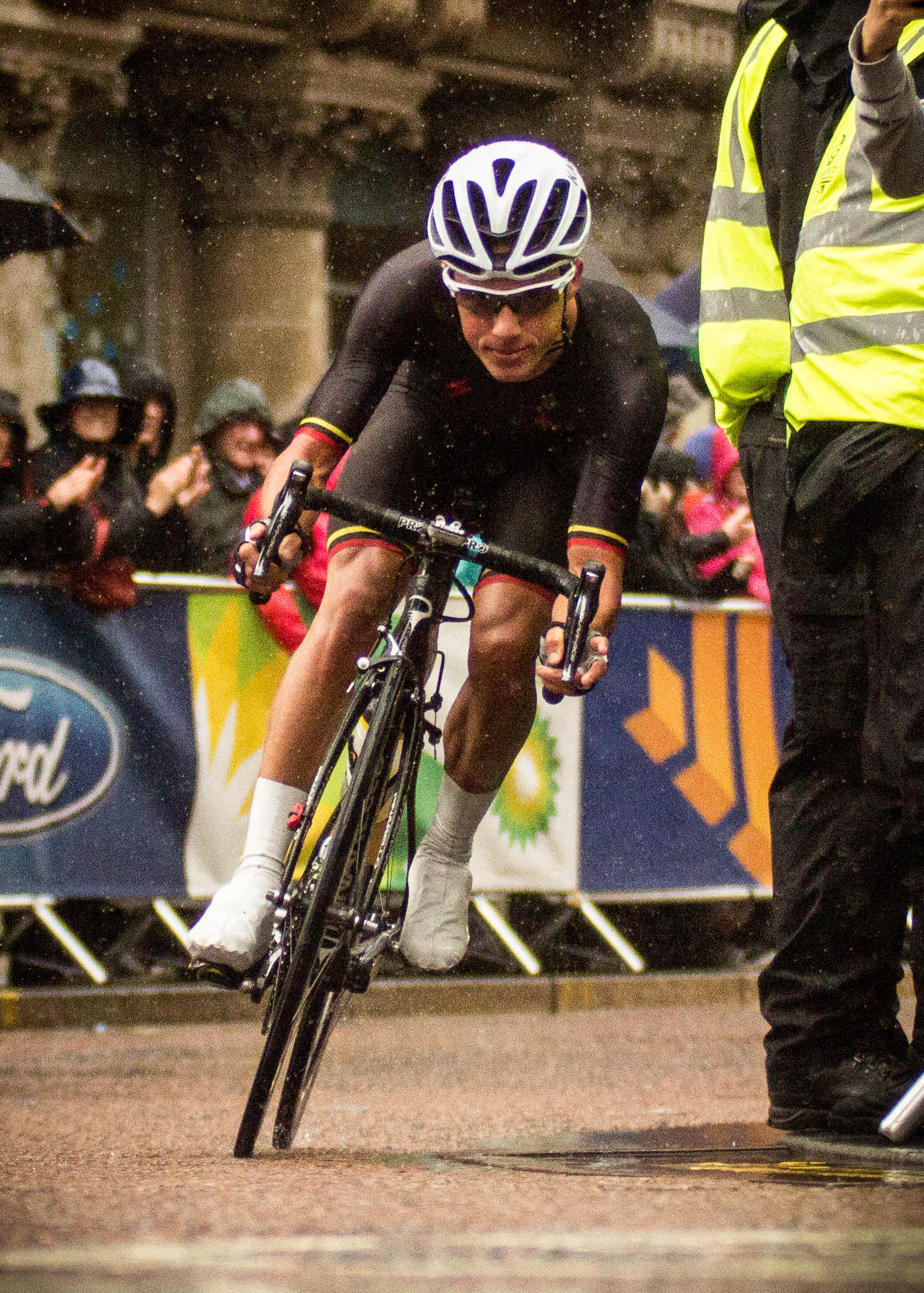
Kennaugh riding for the Isle of Man at the 2014 Commonwealth Games in Glasgow

Kennaugh took his first individual professional win on the road at the Settimana Internazionale di Coppi e Bartali in March, winning the second stage at Sogliano al Rubicone, after going clear on the last climb of the day with Francesco Manuel Bongiorno of the Bardiani–CSF team and out-sprinted him for the honours. Kennaugh went on to win the race by 12 seconds ahead of teammate Dario Cataldo, who had taken 48 seconds out of him in the final 10 km (6.2 mi) individual time trial.

In May 2014 Kennaugh broke Mark Cavendish's 2007 Isle of Man 10-mile time trial record by 30 seconds, setting a new record of 19m 38.982s at Ballamoar. Kennaugh won the British National Road Race Championships on 29 June, outsprinting Sky teammate Ben Swift in Abergavenny. Despite his good form Kennaugh was not selected for the Tour de France, instead riding the Tour of Austria, where he won the first stage and held the leader's jersey for the rest of the race to take his second stage race victory of the season. Kennaugh then competed for the Isle of Man at the Commonwealth Games in Glasgow, winning a silver medal in the points race on the track and eighth in the road race after a long solo breakaway attempt. Kennaugh rode the Vuelta a España, helping Chris Froome finish second overall.

==== 2015 ====
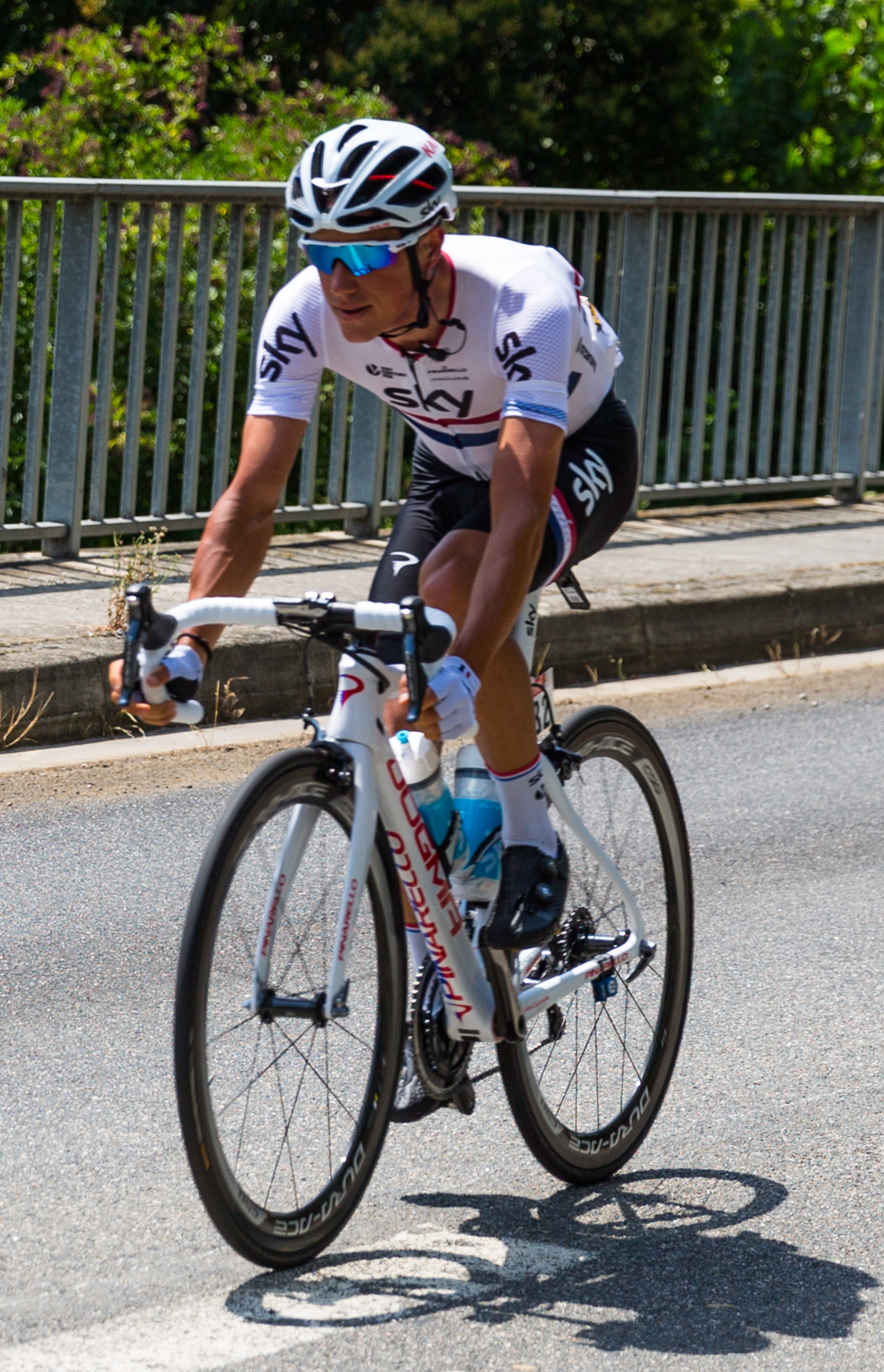
Kennaugh at the 2015 Tour de France in his National champions jersey.

Kennaugh won the opening stage of the Critérium du Dauphiné after attacking on the final climb and holding off the charging main field by two seconds on the descent into the finish in Albertville. Kennaugh lost the race lead after the team time trial on Stage 3, but then helped Chris Froome win the event overall.

In June, he won the National Road Race Championships, distancing Mark Cavendish on the final cobbled climb and becoming the first rider to successfully defend the title since Roger Hammond in 2004. He was selected to ride the 2015 Tour de France, but struggled with illness and withdrew on Stage 16.

In September, Kennaugh broke Chris Boardman's time trial record for the 37.73-mile (60.72-kilometre) Isle of Man TT Mountain Course by six seconds, riding a standard racing bicycle. Boardman had recorded a time of 1hr 23min 54secs in 1993, a time which would prove to be the longest standing cycling record on the Isle of Man, until it was beaten by Kennaugh.

==== 2016 ====
Kennaugh began his season in Australia in January. After riding the Tour Down Under, Kennaugh won the Cadel Evans Great Ocean Road Race in Geelong after attacked from a small group on the final climb and held off the chasers for the 12 kilometres (7.5 mi) to the finish line. He finished six seconds ahead of a group of 19 riders. The following week, Kennaugh rode the Herald Sun Tour. On the second stage, when he and teammate Chris Froome broke away to cross the line 17 seconds ahead of the field; Kennaugh won the stage and took the lead. The following two stages ended in sprints, during which Kennaugh increased his lead. On the final stage, Froome attacked on the penultimate ascent of Arthurs Seat, then attacked again on the final climb to win the stage and take the overall victory. Kennaugh was second, 29 seconds behind.

In May, Kennaugh crashed out of Stage 3 of the Tour of California, suffering a broken collarbone. Kennaugh had been originally named as part of Team GB's five-man team for the 2016 Summer Olympics, however, in July 2016 he withdrew, citing a lack of form, allowing Tour de France stage winner Steve Cummings to take his place.

Kennaugh was named on the startlist for the Vuelta a España. Team Sky won the opening team trial team time trial to Castrelo de Miño and as Kennaugh was the first rider to cross the line, he took the leader's Red Jersey, the first time he had led a Grand Tour in his career.

==== 2017 ====
In June, Kennaugh won stage 7 at the Critérium du Dauphiné, becoming the first British rider to take a stage victory on Alpe d'Huez. However, he was not included in the Team Sky squad for the 2017 Tour de France.

=== Bora–Hansgrohe (2018–2019) ===
In August 2017, he announced that he was leaving Sky and joining Bora–Hansgrohe on a two-year contract from 2018. He started his season at the 2018 Tour Down Under.

== Post-racing career ==
In 2019, Kennaugh joined ITV4's coverage of the Tour de France as a pundit alongside Gary Imlach, following the departure of Chris Boardman the previous year. Boardman returned as a pundit for the 2020 Tour, however, and Kennaugh continued his role alongside Boardman and Imlach.

In 2024, he announced he would be joining Astana Qazaqstan Team as a director sportif.

== Career achievements ==
=== Major results ===
==== Road ====
2006
2nd Overall Junior Tour of Wales
3rd Road race, National Junior Championships
2007
National Junior Championships

1st Road race
2nd Time trial

1st Overall Keizer der Juniores
1st British National Junior Road Race Series
3rd Overall Junior Tour of Wales

1st Mountains classification

2008
1st Road race, National Under-23 Championships
1st Trofeo Internazionale Bastianelli
1st GP Capodarco
1st Prologue (TTT) Tour Alsace
2nd Road race, National Championships
2nd Grand Prix of Wales
2009
1st Road race, National Under-23 Championships
3rd Road race, National Championships
3rd Overall Giro Ciclistico d'Italia

1st Stage 3

4th Road race, UCI World Under-23 Championships
8th Trofeo Internazionale Bastianelli
2010
2nd Road race, National Championships
2011
3rd Road race, National Championships
3rd Overall Route du Sud
5th Overall Tour de Pologne
2013
1st Lincoln Grand Prix
1st Stage 1b (TTT) Giro del Trentino
4th Road race, National Championships
2014 (5 pro wins)
1st Road race, National Championships
1st Overall Settimana Internazionale di Coppi e Bartali

1st Stages 1b (TTT) & 2

1st Overall Tour of Austria

1st Points classification
1st Stage 1

8th Road race, Commonwealth Games
10th Overall Bayern Rundfahrt
2015 (2)
1st Road race, National Championships
1st Stage 1 Critérium du Dauphiné
1st Stage 1 (TTT) Tour de Romandie
6th Overall Vuelta a Andalucía
9th Overall Tour of California
9th Cadel Evans Great Ocean Road Race
2016 (2)
1st Cadel Evans Great Ocean Road Race
Vuelta a España

1st Stage 1 (TTT)
Held after Stage 1

2nd Overall Herald Sun Tour

1st Stage 1

5th Overall Vuelta a Burgos
2017 (1)
1st Stage 7 Critérium du Dauphiné
4th Road race, National Championships
2018 (1)
1st Grand Prix Pino Cerami
3rd Tre Valli Varesine

===== Grand Tour general classification results timeline =====
Grand Tour	2010	2011	2012	2013	2014	2015	2016
Giro d'Italia	—	87	DNF	—	—	—	—
Tour de France	—	—	—	77	—	DNF	—
Vuelta a España	DNF	—	—	—	71	—	42

Legend
—	Did not compete
DNF	Did not finish

==== Track ====
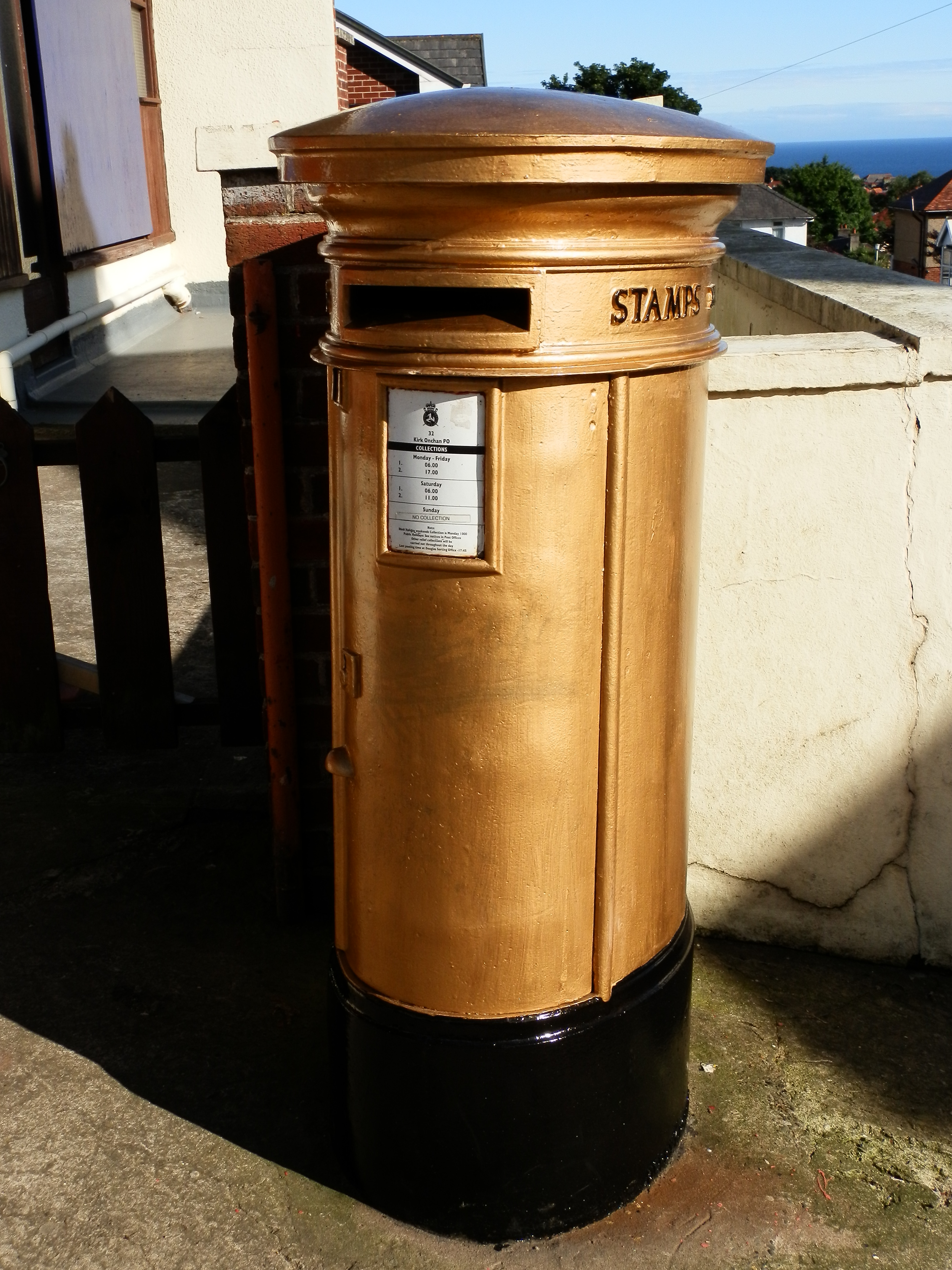
Gold pillar box in Onchan honouring Kennaugh's 2012 Olympic gold medal

2006
UCI World Junior Championships

1st Scratch
3rd Team pursuit

1st Team pursuit, UEC European Junior Championships
2007
UEC European Junior Championships

1st Team pursuit
2nd Scratch

1st Team pursuit, UEC European Under-23 Championships
National Junior Championships

1st Individual pursuit
1st Points race
3rd Scratch

1st UIV Cup, Ghent (with Adam Blythe)
2008
1st Team pursuit, UEC European Championships
1st UIV Cup, Berlin (with Jonathan Bellis)
1st UIV Cup, Copenhagen (with Jonathan Bellis)
2nd Points race, UCI World Cup Classics, Cali
2009
1st Madison, National Championships (with Mark Christian)
UCI World Cup Classics

1st Team pursuit, Ballerup
2nd Madison, Beijing (with Rob Hayles)

2010
National Championships

1st Scratch
1st Individual pursuit

2011
1st Team pursuit, UEC European Championships
National Championships

1st Madison (with Luke Rowe)
1st Points race

3rd Team pursuit, UCI World Championships
2012
1st Team pursuit, Olympic Games
1st Team pursuit, UCI World Championships
2014
2nd Points race, Commonwealth Games
2017
2nd Six Days of London (with Mark Cavendish)

=== World records ===
Discipline	Record	Date	Event	Velodrome	Ref
Team pursuit	3:53.295	4 April 2012	World Championships	Melbourne Arena (Melbourne)	
Team pursuit	3:52.499	2 August 2012	Olympic Games	Lee Valley (London)	
Team pursuit	3:51.659	3 August 2012	Olympic Games	Lee Valley (London)	

== See also ==
- 2012 Summer Olympics and Paralympics gold post boxes
- List of British cyclists
