= 2012 UCI Track Cycling World Championships =

Cycling world championships

- Venue: Melbourne, Australia
- Date: 4–8 April 2012
- Velodrome: Hisense Arena
- Events: 19

The 2012 UCI Track Cycling World Championships was the World Championships for track cycling in 2012. They took place in Melbourne, Australia from 4 to 8 April 2012. The championships took place in the Hisense Arena which previously hosted the world championships in 2004 and from 2008 to 2010 a round of the World Cup as well as the track cycling at the 2006 Commonwealth Games.

The championships were also the final ranking event for the purposes of Olympic qualification. Ten of the nineteen World Championship disciplines are replicated at the 2012 Summer Olympics.

The championships were dominated by the rivalry between Australia and Great Britain, who shared 12 of the 19 gold medals available between them, including in eight of the ten Olympic events. Australia won the greatest total number of medals (15). while the British team led in Olympic events. Of the other nations, only Germany won more than one gold medal.

Several World Records were broken during the championship. Kristina Vogel and Miriam Welte started the hunt with a new record in the qualifying of the Team sprint, just to break the record once again during the final. Ed Clancy, Peter Kennaugh, Steven Burke and Geraint Thomas followed up with a new record during the Team pursuit final. At the Women's Team pursuit competition, Dani King, Laura Trott and Joanna Rowsell set a new record. During the last day of the competition, Anna Meares set the last new world record in the 500 m time trial race on her way to the gold medal.

== Schedule ==
The competition days will be split in Afternoon and Evening Sessions.

| Date | Time | Round |
|---|---|---|
| 4 April 2012 | 15:00 | Men's Team pursuit qualifying |
| 4 April 2012 | 19:00 | Women's Team sprint qualifying |
| 4 April 2012 | 19:00 | Men's Team pursuit final |
| 4 April 2012 | 19:00 | Men's Team sprint qualifying |
| 4 April 2012 | 19:00 | Women's Team sprint final |
| 4 April 2012 | 19:00 | Men's Scratch final |
| 4 April 2012 | 19:00 | Men's Team sprint final |
| 5 April 2012 | 13:30 | Women's sprint qualifying |
| 5 April 2012 | 13:30 | Women's sprint 1/16, 1/8 Final |
| 5 April 2012 | 13:30 | Women's Team pursuit qualifying |
| 5 April 2012 | 13:30 | Men's Omnium, Flying lap |
| 5 April 2012 | 19:00 | Women's Sprint quarterfinals |
| 5 April 2012 | 19:00 | Women's Team pursuit final |
| 5 April 2012 | 19:00 | Men's Omnium, Points race |
| 5 April 2012 | 19:00 | Men's 1 km time trial |
| 5 April 2012 | 19:00 | Women's Points race final |
| 5 April 2012 | 19:00 | Men's Omnium, Elimination |
| 6 April 2012 | 13:30 | Men's sprint qualifying |
| 6 April 2012 | 13:30 | Men's sprint 1/16, 1/8 Final |
| 6 April 2012 | 13:30 | Men's Omnium, Individual pursuit |
| 6 April 2012 | 13:30 | Women's Omnium, Flying lap |
| 6 April 2012 | 19:00 | Women's Sprint semifinals |
| 6 April 2012 | 19:00 | Men's Sprint quarterfinals |
| 6 April 2012 | 19:00 | Women's Scratch final |
| 6 April 2012 | 19:00 | Men's Omnium, Scratch |
| 6 April 2012 | 19:00 | Women's Sprint final |
| 6 April 2012 | 19:00 | Women's Omnium, Points race |
| 6 April 2012 | 19:00 | Men's Omnium, 1 km time trial |
| 6 April 2012 | 19:00 | Women's Omnium, Elimination |

| Date | Time | Round |
|---|---|---|
| 7 April 2012 | 13:00 | Men's Individual pursuit qualifying |
| 7 April 2012 | 13:00 | Women's Keirin, Round 1 |
| 7 April 2012 | 13:00 | Women's Omnium, Individual pursuit |
| 7 April 2012 | 19:00 | Men's Sprint semifinals |
| 7 April 2012 | 19:00 | Women's Omnium, Scratch |
| 7 April 2012 | 19:00 | Women's Keirin, Round 2 |
| 7 April 2012 | 19:00 | Women's Omnium, 500m time trial |
| 7 April 2012 | 19:00 | Women's Keirin, Final |
| 7 April 2012 | 19:00 | Men's Individual pursuit final |
| 7 April 2012 | 19:00 | Men's Sprint final |
| 7 April 2012 | 19:00 | Men's Point race final |
| 8 April 2012 | 14:30 | Men's Keirin, Round 1 |
| 8 April 2012 | 14:30 | Women's Individual pursuit qualifying |
| 8 April 2012 | 19:00 | Women's Individual pursuit final |
| 8 April 2012 | 19:00 | Men's Keirin, Round 2 |
| 8 April 2012 | 19:00 | Women's 500m time trial final |
| 8 April 2012 | 19:00 | Men's Keirin, Final |
| 8 April 2012 | 19:00 | Men's Madison final |

== Medal summary ==
| Event | Gold | | Silver | | Bronze | |
|---|---|---|---|---|---|---|
Men's Events
| Sprint | Grégory Baugé; France | | Jason Kenny; Great Britain | | Chris Hoy; Great Britain | |
| 1 km time trial | Stefan Nimke; Germany | 1:00.082 WR | Michaël D'Almeida; France | 1:00.509 | Simon van Velthooven; New Zealand | 1:00.543 |
| Individual pursuit | Michael Hepburn; Australia | 4:15.839 | Jack Bobridge; Australia | 4:16.313 | Westley Gough; New Zealand | 4:16.945 |
| Team pursuit | Great Britain; Ed Clancy; Steven Burke; Peter Kennaugh; Geraint Thomas; Andrew Tennant* | 3:53.295 WR | Australia; Glenn O'Shea; Jack Bobridge; Rohan Dennis; Michael Hepburn | 3:53.401 | New Zealand; Aaron Gate; Sam Bewley; Westley Gough; Marc Ryan | 3:57.592 |
| Team sprint | Australia; Shane Perkins; Scott Sunderland; Matthew Glaetzer | 43.266 | France; Grégory Baugé; Kévin Sireau; Michaël D'Almeida | 43.267 | New Zealand; Ethan Mitchell; Sam Webster; Edward Dawkins | 43.812 |
| Keirin | Chris Hoy; Great Britain | | Maximilian Levy; Germany | | Jason Kenny; Great Britain | |
| Scratch | Ben Swift; Great Britain | | Nolan Hoffman; South Africa | | Wim Stroetinga; Netherlands | |
| Points race | Cameron Meyer; Australia | 33 | Ben Swift; Great Britain | 32 | Kenny De Ketele; Belgium | 30 |
| Madison | Belgium; Kenny De Ketele; Gijs Van Hoecke | 24 | Great Britain; Ben Swift; Geraint Thomas | 18 | Australia; Leigh Howard; Cameron Meyer | 11 |
| Omnium | Glenn O'Shea; Australia | | Zachary Bell; Canada | | Lasse Norman Hansen; Denmark | |
Women's Events
| Sprint | Victoria Pendleton; Great Britain | | Simona Krupeckaitė; Lithuania | | Anna Meares; Australia | |
| 500 m time trial | Anna Meares; Australia | 33.010 WR | Miriam Welte; Germany | 33.626 | Jessica Varnish; Great Britain | 33.999 |
| Individual pursuit | Alison Shanks; New Zealand | 3:30.199 | Wendy Houvenaghel; Great Britain | 3:32.340 | Ashlee Ankudinoff; Australia | 3:33.593 |
| Team pursuit | Great Britain; Dani King; Laura Trott; Joanna Rowsell | 3:15.720 WR | Australia; Annette Edmondson; Melissa Hoskins; Josephine Tomic | 3:16.943 | Canada; Tara Whitten; Jasmin Glaesser; Gillian Carleton | 3:19.529 |
| Team sprint | Germany; Kristina Vogel; Miriam Welte | 32.549 WR | Australia; Kaarle McCulloch; Anna Meares | 32.597 | China; Gong Jinjie; Guo Shuang | 32.870 |
| Keirin | Anna Meares; Australia | | Ekaterina Gnidenko; Russia | | Kristina Vogel; Germany | |
| Scratch | Katarzyna Pawłowska; Poland | | Melissa Hoskins; Australia | | Kelly Druyts; Belgium | |
| Points race | Anastasia Chulkova; Russia | 31 | Jasmin Glaesser; Canada | 28 | Caroline Ryan; Ireland | 24 |
| Omnium | Laura Trott; Great Britain | | Annette Edmondson; Australia | | Sarah Hammer; United States | |

- Shaded events are non-Olympic
- Cyclists marked (*) raced in qualification round only

== Medal table ==
After 19 events.

| Rank | Nation | Gold | Silver | Bronze | Total |
|---|---|---|---|---|---|
| 1 | Australia (AUS) | 6 | 6 | 3 | 15 |
| 2 | Great Britain (GBR) | 6 | 4 | 3 | 13 |
| 3 | Germany (GER) | 2 | 2 | 1 | 5 |
| 4 | France (FRA) | 1 | 2 | 0 | 3 |
| 5 | Russia (RUS) | 1 | 1 | 0 | 2 |
| 6 | New Zealand (NZL) | 1 | 0 | 4 | 5 |
| 7 | Belgium (BEL) | 1 | 0 | 2 | 3 |
| 8 | Poland (POL) | 1 | 0 | 0 | 1 |
| 9 | Canada (CAN) | 0 | 2 | 1 | 3 |
| 10 | Lithuania (LTU) | 0 | 1 | 0 | 1 |
| 10 | South Africa (RSA) | 0 | 1 | 0 | 1 |
| 12 | China (CHN) | 0 | 0 | 1 | 1 |
| 12 | Denmark (DEN) | 0 | 0 | 1 | 1 |
| 12 | Ireland (IRL) | 0 | 0 | 1 | 1 |
| 12 | Netherlands (NED) | 0 | 0 | 1 | 1 |
| 12 | United States (USA) | 0 | 0 | 1 | 1 |
| Totals (16 entries) | | 19 | 19 | 19 | 57 |

== See also ==
- 2011–12 UCI Track Cycling World Ranking
- 2011–12 UCI Track Cycling World Cup Classics
