= Jakob Steigmiller =

German cyclist

Personal information
- Born: 1 January 1990 (age 36) Biberach an der Riss

Cycling career
- Sport: Cycling
- Discipline: Track cycling
- Role: Rider
- Rider type: team pursuit

Jakob Steigmiller (born 1 January 1990 in Biberach an der Riss) is a German male track cyclist. He competed in the team pursuit event at the 2011 and 2012 UCI Track Cycling World Championships.
