= Cycling at the 2012 Summer Olympics – Men's team pursuit =

Men's cycling team pursuit at the Games of the XXX Olympiad
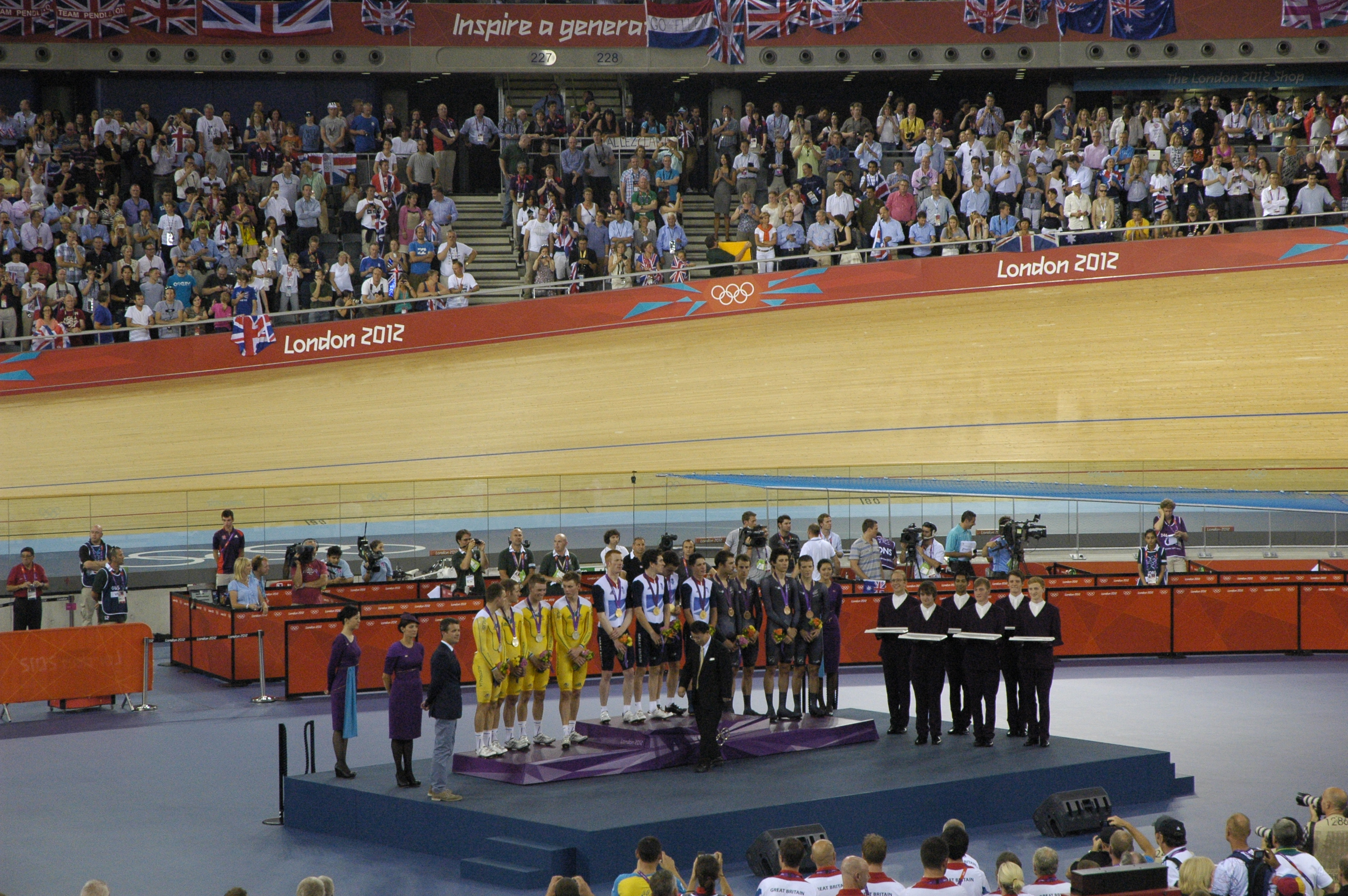
- Venue: London Velopark
- Date: 2 to 3 August 2012
- Competitors: 44 from 10 nations
- Winning time: 3:51.659 WR, OR

Medalists
1st place, gold medalist(s)		Ed Clancy; Geraint Thomas; Steven Burke; Peter Kennaugh	Great Britain
2nd place, silver medalist(s)		Jack Bobridge; Glenn O'Shea; Rohan Dennis; Michael Hepburn	Australia
3rd place, bronze medalist(s)		Sam Bewley; Aaron Gate; Marc Ryan; Jesse Sergent; Westley Gough	New Zealand

The men's cycling team pursuit at the 2012 Olympic Games in London took place at the London Velopark on 2 and 3 August.

The gold medal was won in world record-breaking time by Great Britain's team consisting of Ed Clancy, Geraint Thomas, Steven Burke and Peter Kennaugh. Australia took the silver medal and New Zealand won bronze.

== Competition format ==
The men's team pursuit race consists of a 4 km race between two teams of four cyclists, starting on opposite sides of the track. If one team catches the other, the race is over.

The tournament started with an initial qualifying round. The top four teams in the qualifying round remained in contention for the gold medal, the 5th to 8th-place teams could compete for a possible bronze, and the remaining teams were eliminated.

The "first round" consisted of the four fastest qualifiers competing in head-to-head races (1st vs. 4th, 2nd vs. 3rd). The winners of these heats advanced to the gold medal final. The other four qualifiers also competed in the first round (5th vs. 8th and 6th vs. 7th). Advancement to the bronze medal final was based solely on time, with the fastest two teams among the six qualifiers who had not advanced to the gold medal final reaching the bronze medal final. Qualification races were also held to determine 5th and 6th place (between the next two fastest first-round teams who had not reached either the gold or bronze finals) and 7th/8th place (among the remaining two first-round teams).

== Schedule ==
All times are British Summer Time

Date	Time	Round
Thursday 2 August 2012	16:42	Qualification
Friday 3 August 2012	16:18	First round
Friday 3 August 2012	17:59	Final

== Results ==
=== Qualification ===
Rank	Country	Cyclists	Result	Notes
1	Great Britain	Ed Clancy; Geraint Thomas; Steven Burke; Peter Kennaugh	3:52.499	Q, WR, OR
2	Australia	Jack Bobridge; Glenn O'Shea; Rohan Dennis; Michael Hepburn	3:55.694	Q
3	New Zealand	Sam Bewley; Westley Gough; Marc Ryan; Jesse Sergent	3:57.607	Q
4	Denmark	Lasse Norman Hansen; Michael Mørkøv; Rasmus Quaade; Casper von Folsach	3:58.298	Q
5	Russia	Evgeny Kovalev; Ivan Kovalev; Alexei Markov; Alexander Serov	3:59.264	Q
6	Spain	Pablo Bernal; Sebastian Vedri; David Juaneda; Albert Barcelo	4:02.113	Q
7	Colombia	Juan Esteban Arango; Edwin Ávila; Arles Castro; Weimar Roldán	4:03.712	Q
8	Netherlands	Levi Heimans; Jenning Huizenga; Wim Stroetinga; Tim Veldt	4:03.818	Q
9	Belgium	Gijs van Hoecke; Dominique Cornu; Jonathan Dufrasne; Kenny De Ketele	4:04.053	
10	South Korea	Choi Seung-Woo; Jang Sun-jae; Park Keon-Woo; Park Seon-Ho	4:07.210	

=== First round ===
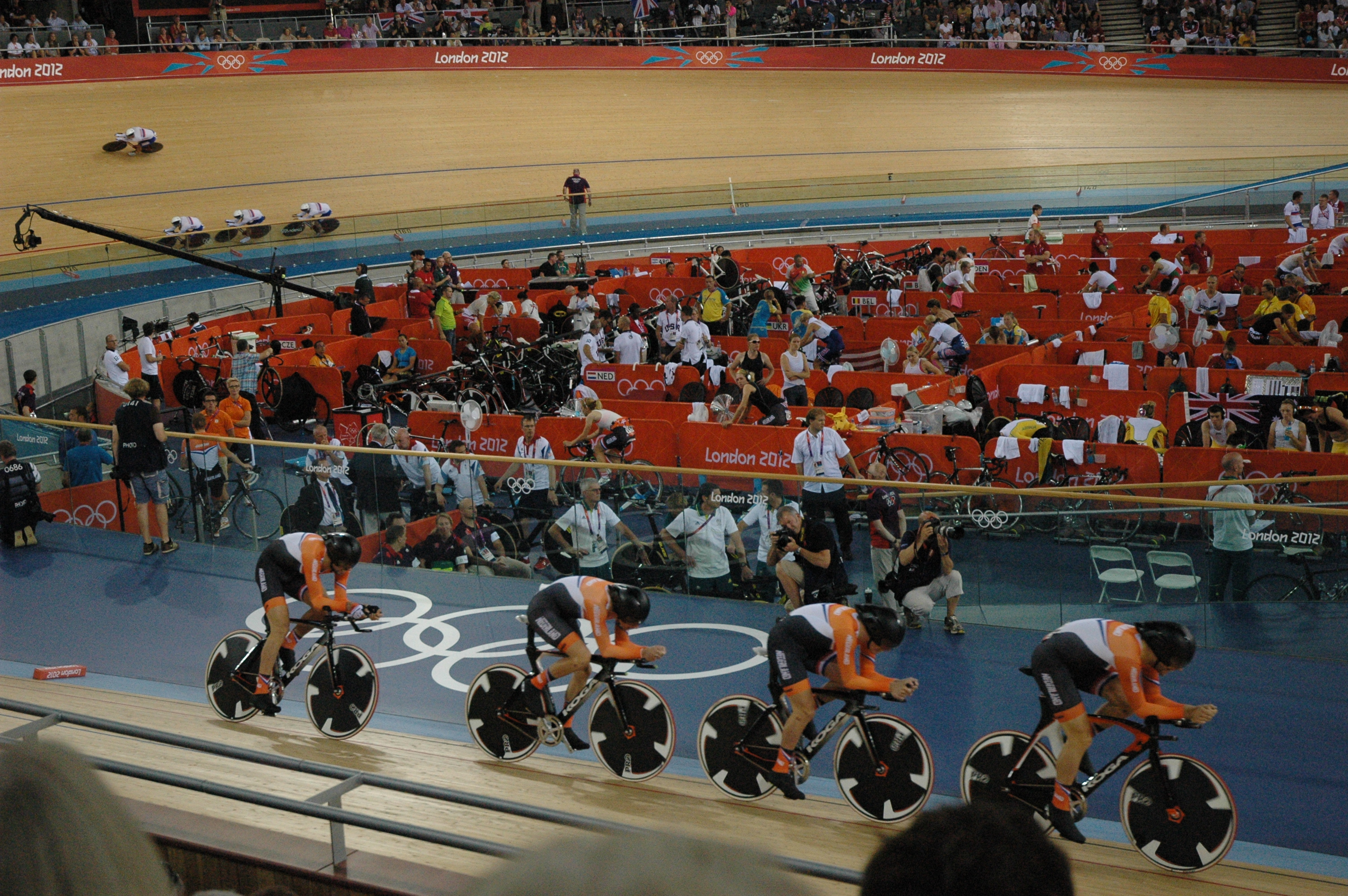
The Dutch team

Rank	Heat	Country	Cyclists	Result	Notes
1	4	Great Britain	Ed Clancy; Geraint Thomas; Steven Burke; Peter Kennaugh	3:52.743	
2	3	Australia	Jack Bobridge; Glenn O'Shea; Rohan Dennis; Michael Hepburn	3:54.317	
3	3	New Zealand	Sam Bewley; Marc Ryan; Jesse Sergent; Aaron Gate	3:56.442	
4	2	Russia	Evgeny Kovalev; Ivan Kovalev; Alexei Markov; Alexander Serov	3:57.237	
5	4	Denmark	Lasse Norman Hansen; Michael Mørkøv; Rasmus Quaade; Casper von Folsach	3:57.396	
6	1	Spain	Eloy Teruel; Sebastian Vedri; David Juaneda; Albert Barcelo	3:59.520	
7	2	Netherlands	Levi Heimans; Jenning Huizenga; Wim Stroetinga; Tim Veldt	4:04.029	
8	1	Colombia	Edwin Ávila; Arles Castro; Kevin Ríos; Weimar Roldán	4:05.485	

=== Finals ===
==== Final 7th-8th place ====
Rank	Country	Cyclists	Result	Notes
7	Netherlands	Levi Heimans; Jenning Huizenga; Wim Stroetinga; Tim Veldt	4:04.569	
8	Colombia	Edwin Ávila; Arles Castro; Kevin Ríos; Weimar Roldán	4:04.772	

==== Final 5th-6th place ====
Rank	Country	Cyclists	Result	Notes
5	Denmark	Michael Mørkøv; Mathias Møller Nielsen; Rasmus Quaade; Casper von Folsach	4:02.671	
6	Spain	Eloy Teruel; Sebastian Vedri; David Juaneda; Albert Barcelo	4:02.746	

==== Final bronze medal ====
Rank	Country	Cyclists	Result	Notes
3rd place, bronze medalist(s)	New Zealand	Sam Bewley; Marc Ryan; Jesse Sergent; Aaron Gate	3:55.952	
4	Russia	Evgeny Kovalev; Ivan Kovalev; Alexei Markov; Alexander Serov	3:58.282	

==== Final gold medal ====
Rank	Country	Cyclists	Result	Notes
1st place, gold medalist(s)	Great Britain	Ed Clancy; Geraint Thomas; Steven Burke; Peter Kennaugh	3:51.659	WR, OR
2nd place, silver medalist(s)	Australia	Jack Bobridge; Glenn O'Shea; Rohan Dennis; Michael Hepburn	3:54.581	
