= Michael Hepburn =

Australian racing cyclist (born 1991)

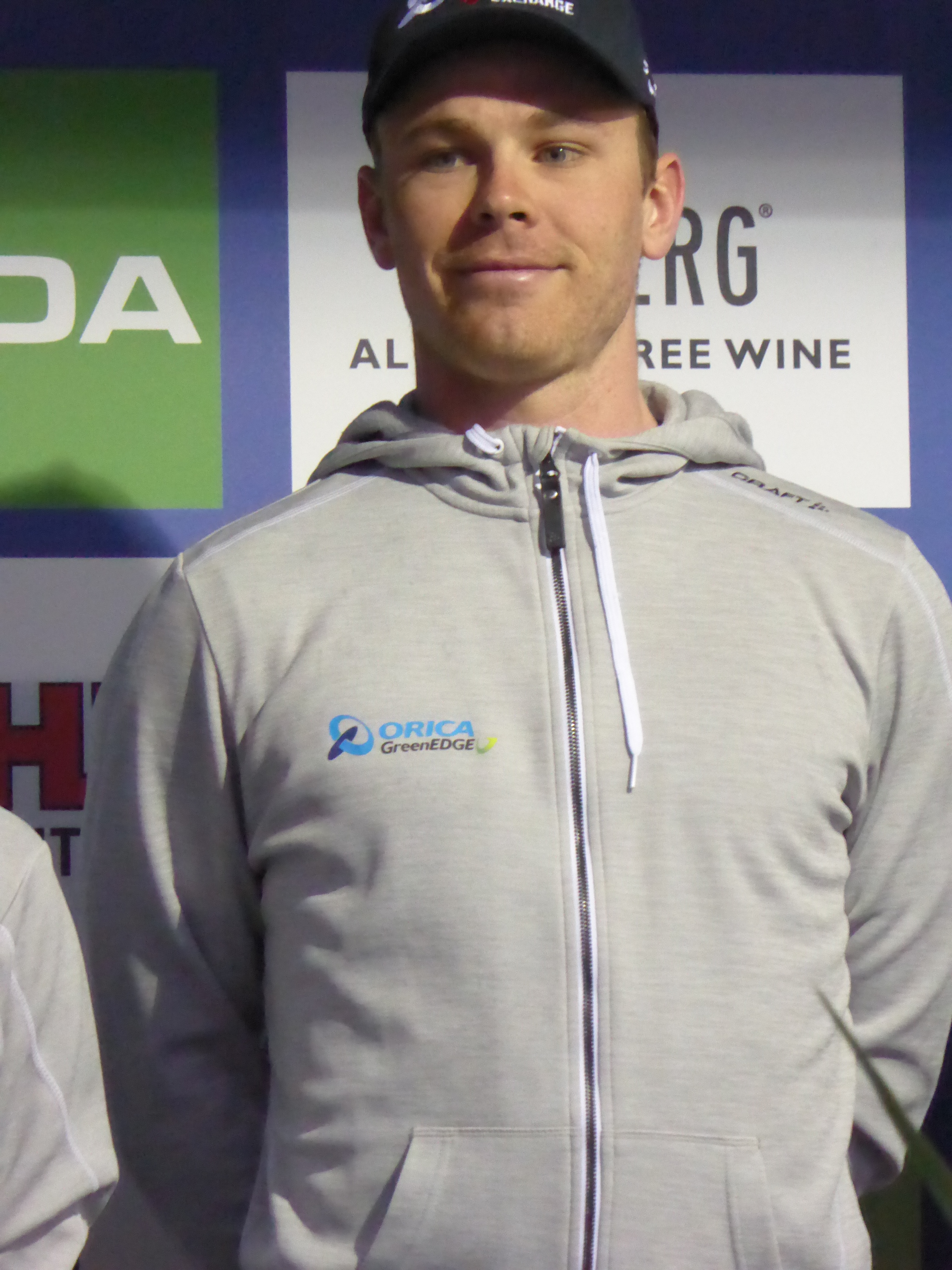
- Hepburn at the 2016 Tour of Britain

Personal information
- Full name: Michael David Hepburn
- Nickname: Heppy
- Born: 17 August 1991 (age 35) Brisbane, Australia
- Height: 1.86 m (6 ft 1 in)
- Weight: 76 kg (168 lb; 12 st 0 lb)

Cycling career
- Sport: Cycling
- Current team: Team Jayco–AlUla
- Disciplines: Track; Road
- Role: Rider (retired)
- Rider type: Endurance (track); Prologue specialist (road)

Professional teams
- 2010–2011: Team Jayco–Skins
- 2012–2025: GreenEDGE

Major wins
- Road Grand Tours Giro d'Italia 2 TTT stages (2014, 2015) One-day races and Classics National Time Trial Championships (2014) Track World Championships Individual pursuit (2012, 2013) Team pursuit (2010, 2011, 2013, 2014)
Medal record
Representing Australia
Men's road bicycle racing
World Championships
Bronze medal – third place	2011 Copenhagen	Under-23 time trial
Men's track cycling
Olympic Games
Silver medal – second place	2012 London	Team pursuit
Silver medal – second place	2016 Rio de Janeiro	Team pursuit
World Championships
Gold medal – first place	2010 Ballerup	Team pursuit
Gold medal – first place	2011 Apeldoorn	Team pursuit
Gold medal – first place	2012 Melbourne	Individual pursuit
Gold medal – first place	2013 Minsk	Team pursuit
Gold medal – first place	2013 Minsk	Individual pursuit
Gold medal – first place	2016 London	Team pursuit
Silver medal – second place	2012 Melbourne	Team pursuit
Bronze medal – third place	2011 Apeldoorn	Individual pursuit
Commonwealth Games
Gold medal – first place	2010 Delhi	Team pursuit
Bronze medal – third place	2010 Delhi	Individual pursuit
Representing Orica–GreenEDGE (2013–2014) Orica–BikeExchange (2016)
Men's road bicycle racing
World Championships
Silver medal – second place	2013 Tuscany	Team time trial
Silver medal – second place	2014 Ponferrada	Team time trial
Bronze medal – third place	2016 Doha	Team time trial

Michael Hepburn (born 17 August 1991) is an Australian former professional track and road cyclist, who rode for UCI WorldTeam Team Jayco–AlUla. He is a two-time Olympics silver medalist.

From Brisbane, Hepburn started competitively cycling at 14 years of age after making the change from triathlons.

== Sporting achievements ==
Some of Hepburn's notable achievements include winning the Under 23 road race in the Australian Open Road Championships when he was just 18, and winning the teams pursuit in the 2010 UCI Track Cycling World Championships in Denmark. In 2009 he broke the world record in the U19 3000m Individual Pursuit at the 2009 Australian Track Championships before going on to break the same world record two more times to win at the 2009 Junior World Championships in Russia. He competed at the 2010 Delhi Commonwealth Games where he won a bronze medal in the Individual pursuit and a gold in the Team pursuit.

It was announced on 8 November 2011 that Hepburn would join the GreenEDGE team for their inaugural season in 2012. In 2012, he won the silver medal in the men's team pursuit at the 2012 Olympics. He competed in the men's road race and the men's time trial at the 2014 Commonwealth Games, finishing in 6th in the time trial.

He won silver in the same event at the 2016 Olympics.

In July 2018, he was named in the start list for the 2018 Tour de France.

== Major results ==
=== Road ===
2009
Tour of the Murray River

1st Stages 11 & 12

2010
1st Road race, National Under-23 Championships
1st Stage 1 (TTT) Thüringen Rundfahrt der U23
3rd Rogaland GP
9th Memorial Davide Fardelli
2011
1st Stage 2 Tour of Norway
Tour de l'Avenir

1st Prologue & Stage 4

1st Stage 2 (TTT) Thüringen Rundfahrt der U23
2nd Time trial, National Under-23 Championships
2nd Gran Premio della Liberazione
3rd Time trial, UCI World Under-23 Championships
6th Overall Olympia's Tour
2012
4th Time trial, National Championships
2013
2nd Team time trial, UCI World Championships
2nd Duo Normand (with Jens Mouris)
2014
1st Time trial, National Championships
1st Stage 3 (ITT) Tour of Qatar
1st Stage 1 (TTT) Giro d'Italia
2nd Team time trial, UCI World Championships
6th Time trial, Commonwealth Games
2015
1st Time trial, Oceania Championships
1st Stage 1 (TTT) Giro d'Italia
3rd Overall Bay Classic Series
2016
3rd Team time trial, UCI World Championships
2017
1st Stage 2 Bay Classic Series
4th Time trial, National Championships
7th Hong Kong Challenge
2019
1st Stage 1 (TTT) Tirreno–Adriatico
1st Stage 1 (TTT) Czech Cycling Tour
5th Antwerp Port Epic
2020
1st Stage 1 (TTT) Czech Cycling Tour
4th Time trial, National Championships
2024
1st Stage 1 (TTT) Okolo Slovenska
3rd Time trial, National Championships
2025
5th Time trial, National Championships

==== Grand Tour general classification results timeline ====
Grand Tour	2014	2015	2016	2017	2018	2019	2020	2021	2022	2023	2024	2025
Giro d'Italia	154	160	150	122	—	—	DNF	120	112	77	115	143
Tour de France	—	—	—	—	117	146	—	—	—	—	—	—
Vuelta a España	—	—	—	—	—	—	—	—	118	DNF	—	—

Legend
—	Did not compete
DNF	Did not finish

=== Track ===
2009
UCI World Junior Championships

1st Individual pursuit
2nd Team pursuit

National Junior Championships

1st Individual pursuit
1st Team pursuit
1st Omnium

UCI World Cup Classics

1st Team pursuit, Beijing
1st Team pursuit, Melbourne

2010
Commonwealth Games

1st Team pursuit
3rd Individual pursuit

1st Team pursuit, UCI World Championships
1st Omnium, National Championships
1st Team pursuit, UCI World Cup Classics, Melbourne
2011
UCI World Championships

1st Team pursuit
3rd Individual pursuit

Oceania Championships

1st Individual pursuit
1st Team pursuit

National Championships

2nd Team pursuit
3rd Individual pursuit
3rd Points race

2nd Team pursuit, UCI World Cup, Beijing
2012
UCI World Championships

1st Team pursuit
2nd Individual pursuit

National Championships

1st Individual pursuit
2nd Team pursuit

1st Team pursuit, UCI World Cup, London
2nd Team pursuit, Olympic Games
2013
UCI World Championships

1st Team pursuit
1st Individual pursuit

2016
1st Team pursuit, UCI World Championships
2nd Team pursuit, Olympic Games
