= Jiang Xiao =

Chinese cyclist

Personal information
- Born: 30 June 1987 (age 39)

Cycling career
- Sport: Cycling
- Discipline: Track cycling
- Role: Rider
- Rider type: endurance

Jiang Xiao (born 30 June 1987) is a Chinese male track cyclist, riding for the national team. He competed in the individual pursuit and team pursuit event at the 2010 UCI Track Cycling World Championships.
