= Sam Bewley =

New Zealand racing cyclist (born 1987)

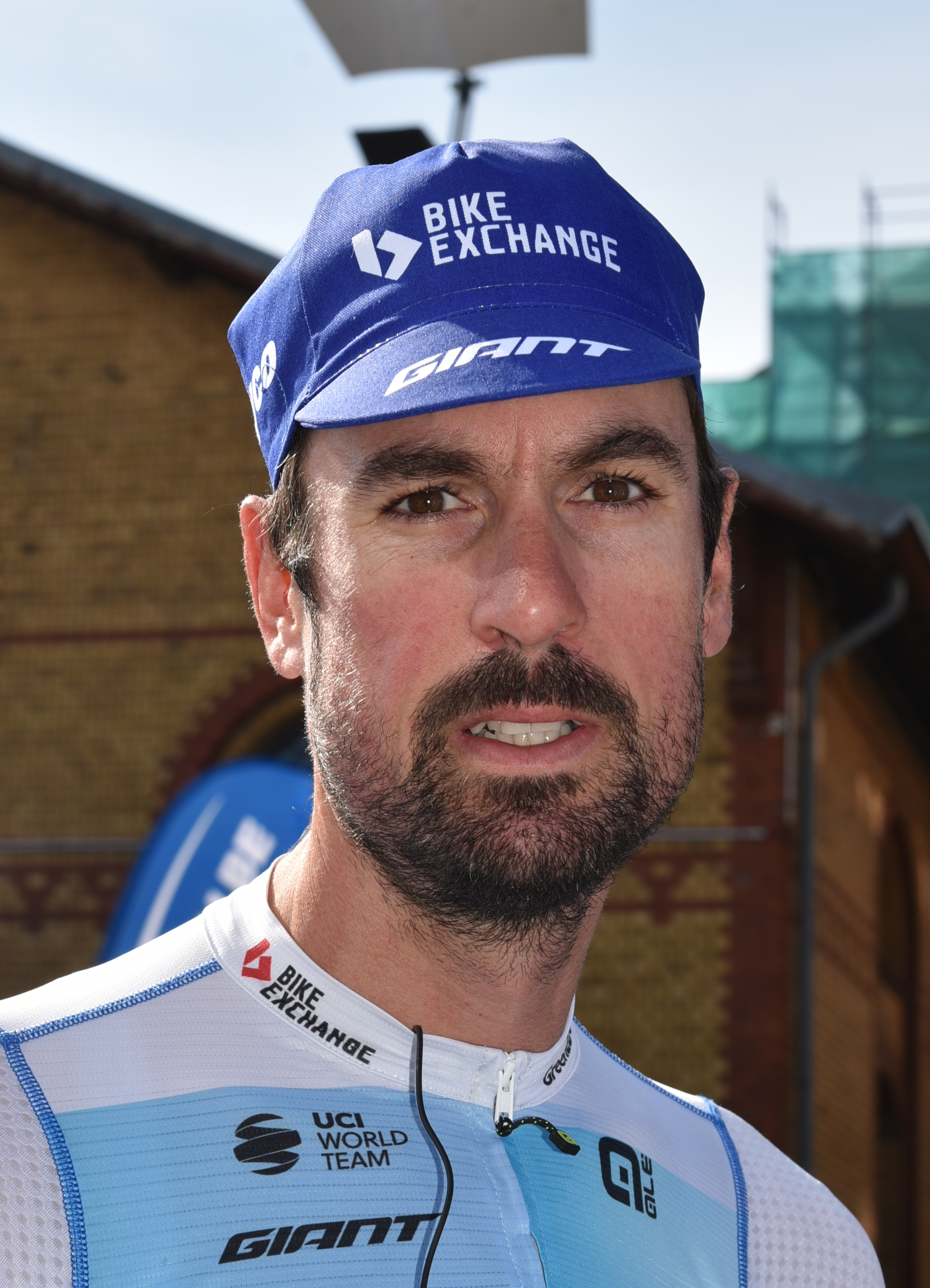
- Bewley in 2022

Personal information
- Full name: Samuel Ryan Bewley
- Nicknames: Bewls, Wagon
- Born: 22 July 1987 (age 39) Rotorua, New Zealand
- Height: 1.9 m (6 ft 3 in)
- Weight: 81 kg (179 lb)

Cycling career
- Sport: Cycling
- Disciplines: Road; Track
- Role: Rider
- Rider type: Domestique (road); Time trialist (road); Endurance (track)

Professional teams
- 2009: Trek–Livestrong
- 2010–2011: Team RadioShack
- 2012: PureBlack Racing
- 2012–2022: Orica–GreenEDGE

Major wins
- Grand Tours Giro d'Italia 1 TTT stage (2015)
Medal record
Representing New Zealand
Men's track cycling
Olympic Games
Bronze medal – third place	2008 Beijing	Team pursuit
Bronze medal – third place	2012 London	Team pursuit
World Championships
Bronze medal – third place	2010 Ballerup	Team pursuit
Bronze medal – third place	2012 Melbourne	Team pursuit
Representing Orica–GreenEDGE
Men's road bicycle racing
World Championships
Bronze medal – third place	2012 Valkenburg	Team time trial

Samuel Ryan Bewley (born 22 July 1987) is an amateur podcast host and former professional racing cyclist from New Zealand who last rode for UCI WorldTeam Team BikeExchange–Jayco. He also competed for UCI ProTeam Team RadioShack and BikeNZ PureBlack Racing. He competed in nine Grand Tours, including five starts at the Vuelta a España and three starts at the Giro d'Italia. Bewley made his sole Tour de France appearance in the 2020 edition, before retiring from professional cycling at the end of 2022.

== Early life ==
Bewley attended Glenholme Primary School, Rotorua Intermediate School and Rotorua Boys' High School.

== Career ==
At the 2008 Summer Olympics in Beijing, Bewley won the bronze medal as part of the New Zealand team in team pursuit, together with Hayden Roulston, Marc Ryan, and Jesse Sergent.

On 8 October 2009, it was announced that Bewley would join the new UCI ProTeam Team RadioShack, which was led by Lance Armstrong and included Levi Leipheimer and Chris Horner.

In May 2012, Bewley joined Australian UCI WorldTeam Orica–GreenEDGE, and made his first appearance for the team at the Bayern–Rundfahrt. At the 2012 Summer Olympics in London, he was again part of the New Zealand team in the men's pursuit, winning bronze for the second successive Games.

In August 2020, he was named in the startlist for the Tour de France. After a crash in stage 10 of the race, in January 2021 Bewley postponed his return to racing until March, due to long-term injuries.

On 1 August 2022, he announced his intention to retire as a professional cyclist at the end of 2022.

== Broadcasting career ==
In 2023, Bewley joined the team of broadcaster NBC for their coverage of the Tour de France, acting as a commentator.

== Major results ==
=== Road ===
2003
1st Road race, National Novice Championships
2005
3rd Road race, National Junior Championships
2006
1st Stage 6a Tour of Southland
2007
1st Stage 1 New Zealand Cycle Classic
7th Chrono Champenois
2011
4th Road race, National Championships
2012
1st Stage 3 New Zealand Cycle Classic
3rd Team time trial, UCI World Championships
2015
1st Stage 1 (TTT) Giro d'Italia
4th Road race, National Championships
2019
1st Stage 1b (TTT) Settimana Internazionale di Coppi e Bartali

==== Grand Tour general classification results timeline ====
Grand Tour	2013	2014	2015	2016	2017	2018	2019	2020
Giro d'Italia	—	—	122	125	—	130	—	—
Tour de France	—	—	—	—	—	—	—	DNF
Vuelta a España	DNF	135	—	140	143	—	100	—

Legend
—	Did not compete
DNF	Did not finish

=== Track ===
2005
UCI World Junior Championships

1st Team pursuit
2nd Individual pursuit

2008
3rd Team pursuit, Olympic Games
2010
1st Team pursuit, UCI World Cup Classics, Cali
2nd Team pursuit, Commonwealth Games
3rd Team pursuit, UCI World Championships
2011
1st Team pursuit, UCI World Cup, Cali
2012
3rd Team pursuit, Olympic Games
3rd Team pursuit, UCI World Championships

== Personal life ==
Bewley is in a relationship with fellow professional cyclist, Hannah Barnes.
