= Marc Ryan =

New Zealand cyclist (born 1982)

Personal information
- Nickname: Dream
- Born: 14 October 1982 (age 44) Timaru, New Zealand
- Height: 1.86 m (6 ft 1 in)
- Weight: 79 kg (174 lb)

Cycling career
- Sport: Cycling
- Current team: Marco Polo Cycling–Donckers Koffie
- Disciplines: Road and track
- Role: Rider
- Rider type: Endurance

Amateur teams
- 2004–2005: Samsung New Zealand
- 2004–2007: Trek-Zookeepers Cafe
- 2007: Mitchelton Wines
- 2007–2009: Colourplus

Professional teams
- 2011–2012: Marco Polo
- 2014: Cibel
Medal record
Representing New Zealand
Men's track cycling
Olympic Games
Bronze medal – third place	2008 Beijing	Team pursuit
Bronze medal – third place	2012 London	Team pursuit
World Championships
Gold medal – first place	2015 Yvelines	Team pursuit
Bronze medal – third place	2012 Melbourne	Team Pursuit
Bronze medal – third place	2014 Cali	Team Pursuit
Bronze medal – third place	2014 Cali	Individual pursuit
Commonwealth Games
Bronze medal – third place	2006 Melbourne	Team pursuit

Marc Ryan (born 14 October 1982) is a New Zealand racing cyclist.

At the 2008 Summer Olympics in Beijing, Ryan won the bronze medal as part of the New Zealand team in team pursuit, together with Sam Bewley, Hayden Roulston, and Jesse Sergent.

At the 2009–2010 UCI Track Cycling World Cup Classics in Melbourne, Ryan and Thomas Scully won the Men's Madison in a time of 44 minutes, 33 seconds, at an average speed of 53.9 km per hour. Second place went to the German riders, Robert Bengsch and Marcel Kalz, and third place to Ukraine.

At the 2012 London Olympics Ryan again won a bronze medal in the team pursuit, together with Jesse Sergent, Sam Bewley, Westley Gough and Aaron Gate.

In July 2024, Ryan is in front of a district court judge over his third drink driving conviction, the judge labelling it "another conviction with an astronomical reading".

== Major results ==
2008
4th Prologue Tour of Southland
2009
4th Tour of Southland

1st Stage 1 TTT
2nd Stage 7

2010
3rd National Time Trial Championships
2012
2nd Prologue Tour de Savoie Mont Blanc
