= Westley Gough =

New Zealand cyclist (born 1988)

Personal information
- Full name: Westley Gough
- Born: 4 May 1988 (age 38)

Cycling career
- Sport: Cycling
- Disciplines: Road and track
- Role: Rider
- Rider type: Time Trialist

Amateur teams
- 2007–2008: Colour Plus
- 2008: Trust House Team
- 2009: Zookeepers-Cycle Surgery
- 2010: Team Solway
- 2010: Team Sprocket (stagiaire)

Professional teams
- 2011–2012: Subway-Avanti
- 2014–2015: Team Budget Forklifts

Major wins
- National Time Trial Championships (2011)
Medal record
Representing New Zealand
Men's track cycling
Olympic Games
Bronze medal – third place	2008 Beijing	Team Pursuit
Bronze medal – third place	2012 London	Team Pursuit
World Championships
Bronze medal – third place	2012 Melbourne	Individual Pursuit
Bronze medal – third place	2012 Melbourne	Team Pursuit

Westley Gough (born 4 May 1988, Hastings) is a New Zealand professional racing cyclist. In 2011 he won the New Zealand National Road Championships ITT.

While at high school at Central Hawke's Bay College, Gough was in the New Zealand team that beat Great Britain for gold in the team pursuit at the 2005 World Junior Championships in Austria. This achievement earned him the Hawke's Bay Secondary Schools Sportsperson of the Year. He gained a silver medal in the individual pursuit at the 2006 World Junior Championships, and he was part of the quartet that won the silver in the team pursuit behind Australia.

He won a bronze medal in the men's team pursuit event at the 2008 Summer Olympics in China. Gough rode in the team's preliminary events, but made way for Hayden Roulston to join the team in the final. The International Olympic Committee subsequently struck an extra bronze medal for Gough to recognise his contribution to the pursuit team's success. In 2010 Westley Gough won the men's omnium at the New Zealand National Track Championships.

Gough represented New Zealand at the 2010 Commonwealth Games held in Delhi in India.

At the 2012 Summer Olympics, he again won a bronze medal in the men's team pursuit.

He rode for Team Budget Forklifts for the 2014 and 2015 seasons.

== Major results ==
2008
3rd Prologue Tour of Southland
2009
2nd Chrono Champenois
2010
2nd National Championships ITT
2011
1st National Championships ITT
1st Stage 5 Tour of Wellington
3rd Prologue Tour of Elk Grove
2012
1st Prologue Tour des Pays de Savoie
2013
3rd National Championships ITT
