= Asier Maeztu =

Spanish cyclist (born 1977)

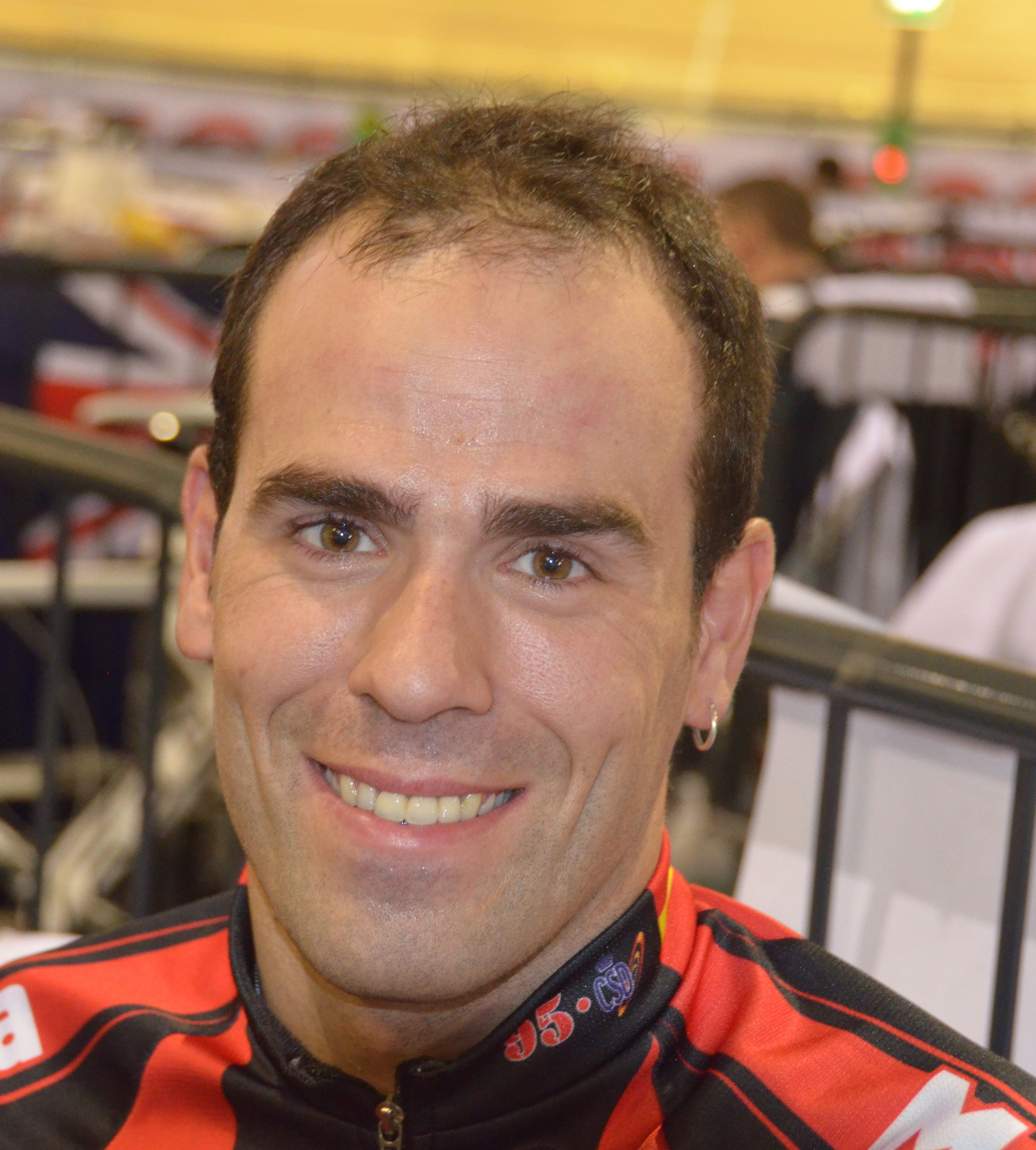
- Maeztu in 2012

Personal information
- Full name: Asier Maeztu Villalabeitia
- Born: 14 October 1977 (age 48) San Sebastián, Spain
- Height: 1.87 m (6 ft 2 in)
- Weight: 83 kg (183 lb)

Sport
- Sport: Cycling
- Club: Gernikesa
Medal record
Representing Spain
Olympic Games
Bronze medal – third place	2004 Athens	Team pursuit
World Championships
Bronze medal – third place	2004 Melbourne	Team pursuit

Asier Maeztu Villalabeitia (Note: In this Spanish name, the first or paternal surname is Maeztu and the second or maternal family name is Villalabeitia.) (born 14 October 1977) is a Spanish cyclist. He had his best achievements in track cycling, in the 4000 m team pursuit. In this discipline he won a bronze medal at the 2004 Summer Olympics and at the 2004 UCI Track Cycling World Championships. His team finished in seventh place at the 2008 Olympics.
