= 2015 UEC European Track Championships – Men's omnium =

Men's omnium at the 2015 UEC European Track Championships
- UEC European Champion jersey
- Venue: Velodrome Suisse, Grenchen
- Date: 16–17 October
- Competitors: 20 from 20 nations

Medalists
gold medal	Elia Viviani	Italy
silver medal	Lasse Norman Hansen	Denmark
bronze medal	Jonathan Dibben	Great Britain

The Men's omnium was held on 16–17 October 2015. 20 riders competed across six events.

== Results ==
=== Scratch race ===
Standings after 1 event.

Rank	Name	Nation	Laps down	Event points
1	Raman Tsishkou	Belarus		40
2	Viktor Manakov	Russia	-1	38
3	Roman Gladysh	Ukraine	-1	36
4	Olivier Beer	Switzerland	-1	34
5	Jonathan Dibben	Great Britain	-1	32
6	Adrian Tekliński	Poland	-1	30
7	Tim Veldt	Netherlands	-1	28
8	Anders Oddli	Norway	-1	26
9	Elia Viviani	Italy	-1	24
10	Lasse Norman Hansen	Denmark	-1	22
11	Lucas Liss	Germany	-1	20
12	Thomas Boudat	France	-1	18
13	Tobias Wauch	Austria	-1	16
14	Ahmet Örken	Turkey	-1	14
15	Jasper De Buyst	Belgium	-1	12
16	Illart Zuazubiskar	Spain	-1	10
17	Fintan Ryan	Ireland	-1	8
18	Ondřej Vendolský	Czech Republic	-1	6
19	Rui Oliveira	Portugal	-1	4
20	Radoslav Konstantinov	Bulgaria	-1	2

=== Individual pursuit ===
Standings after 2 events.

Rank	Name	Nation	Time	Event points	Overall rank	Subtotal
1	Viktor Manakov	Russia	4:21.398	40	1	78
2	Lasse Norman Hansen	Denmark	4:23.173	38	4	60
3	Elia Viviani	Italy	4:23.612	36	5	60
4	Jonathan Dibben	Great Britain	4:24.347	34	2	66
5	Thomas Boudat	France	4:25.076	32	9	50
6	Tim Veldt	Netherlands	4:25.104	30	6	58
7	Jasper De Buyst	Belgium	4:26.714	28	11	40
8	Raman Tsishkou	Belarus	4:28.916	26	3	66
9	Adrian Tekliński	Poland	4:30.709	24	8	54
10	Olivier Beer	Switzerland	4:32.668	22	7	56
11	Rui Oliveira	Portugal	4:32.677	20	15	24
12	Lucas Liss	Germany	4:33.180	18	12	38
13	Ahmet Örken	Turkey	4:33.526	16	14	30
14	Illart Zuazubiskar	Spain	4:33.742	14	16	24
15	Anders Oddli	Norway	4:35.370	12	13	38
16	Roman Gladysh	Ukraine	4:35.583	10	10	46
17	Ondřej Vendolský	Czech Republic	4:35.711	8	18	14
18	Fintan Ryan	Ireland	4:44.520	6	19	14
19	Radoslav Konstantinov	Bulgaria	4:46.535	4	20	6
20	Tobias Wauch	Austria	4:47.700	2	17	18

=== Elimination race ===
Standings after 3 events.

Rank	Name	Nation	Event points	Overall rank	Subtotal
1	Thomas Boudat	France	40	6	90
2	Elia Viviani	Italy	38	2	98
3	Tim Veldt	Netherlands	36	4	94
4	Roman Gladysh	Ukraine	34	8	80
5	Lasse Norman Hansen	Denmark	32	5	92
6	Raman Tsishkou	Belarus	30	3	96
7	Olivier Beer	Switzerland	28	7	84
8	Rui Oliveira	Portugal	26	11	50
9	Viktor Manakov	Russia	24	1	102
10	Tobias Wauch	Austria	22	16	40
11	Illart Zuazubiskar	Spain	20	14	44
12	Adrian Tekliński	Poland	18	10	72
13	Radoslav Konstantinov	Bulgaria	16	19	22
14	Jonathan Dibben	Great Britain	14	9	80
15	Ondřej Vendolský	Czech Republic	12	18	26
16	Jasper De Buyst	Belgium	10	12	50
17	Lucas Liss	Germany	8	13	46
18	Anders Oddli	Norway	6	15	44
19	Fintan Ryan	Ireland	4	20	18
20	Ahmet Örken	Turkey	2	17	32

=== 1km time trial ===
Standings after 4 events.

Rank	Name	Nation	Time	Event points	Overall rank	Subtotal
1	Lucas Liss	Germany	1:02.779	40	11	86
2	Adrian Tekliński	Poland	1:03.520	38	6	110
3	Tim Veldt	Netherlands	1:03.533	36	1	130
4	Lasse Norman Hansen	Denmark	1:03.626	34	3	126
5	Elia Viviani	Italy	1:03.724	32	2	130
6	Jonathan Dibben	Great Britain	1:03.861	30	7	110
7	Rui Oliveira	Portugal	1:04.009	28	12	78
8	Jasper De Buyst	Belgium	1:04.104	26	13	76
9	Viktor Manakov	Russia	1:04.270	24	4	126
10	Olivier Beer	Switzerland	1:04.479	22	9	106
11	Raman Tsishkou	Belarus	1:04.558	20	5	116
12	Thomas Boudat	France	1:04.671	18	8	108
13	Ondřej Vendolský	Czech Republic	1:05.261	16	17	42
14	Roman Gladysh	Ukraine	1:05.348	14	10	94
15	Anders Oddli	Norway	1:05.551	12	14	56
16	Tobias Wauch	Austria	1:07.367	10	15	50
17	Ahmet Örken	Turkey	1:07.562	8	18	40
18	Illart Zuazubiskar	Spain	1:07.648	6	16	50
19	Radoslav Konstantinov	Bulgaria	1:07.771	4	19	26
20	Fintan Ryan	Ireland	1:59.427	2	20	20

=== Flying lap ===
Standings after 5 events.

Rank	Name	Nation	Time	Event points	Overall rank	Subtotal
1	Elia Viviani	Italy	12.946	40	1	170
2	Jasper De Buyst	Belgium	13.237	38	11	114
3	Lucas Liss	Germany	13.240	36	10	122
4	Tim Veldt	Netherlands	13.250	34	2	164
5	Adrian Tekliński	Poland	13.272	32	5	142
6	Lasse Norman Hansen	Denmark	13.306	30	3	156
7	Rui Oliveira	Portugal	13.325	28	12	106
8	Thomas Boudat	France	13.352	26	6	134
9	Viktor Manakov	Russia	13.372	24	4	150
10	Olivier Beer	Switzerland	13.383	22	8	128
11	Anders Oddli	Norway	13.530	20	14	76
12	Jonathan Dibben	Great Britain	13.532	18	9	128
13	Raman Tsishkou	Belarus	13.570	16	7	132
14	Ondřej Vendolský	Czech Republic	13.825	14	16	56
15	Roman Gladysh	Ukraine	13.949	12	13	106
16	Tobias Wauch	Austria	13.979	10	15	60
17	Ahmet Örken	Turkey	14.171	8	18	48
18	Illart Zuazubiskar	Spain	14.210	6	17	56
19	Radoslav Konstantinov	Bulgaria	14.274	4	19	30
20	Fintan Ryan	Ireland	14.511	2	20	22

=== Points race and final standings ===
Riders' points from the previous 5 events were carried into the points race, in which the final standings were decided.

Overall rank	Name	Nation	Subtotal	Sprint points	Lap points	Finish order	Final standings
1st place, gold medalist(s)	Elia Viviani	Italy	170	21	0	3	191
2nd place, silver medalist(s)	Lasse Norman Hansen	Denmark	156	15	20	6	191
3rd place, bronze medalist(s)	Jonathan Dibben	Great Britain	128	20	40	7	188
4	Thomas Boudat	France	134	25	20	2	179
5	Raman Tsishkou	Belarus	132	6	40	5	178
6	Jasper De Buyst	Belgium	114	18	40	12	172
7	Viktor Manakov	Russia	150	2	20	15	172
8	Tim Veldt	Netherlands	164	4	0	18	168
9	Adrian Tekliński	Poland	142	20	0	1	162
10	Lucas Liss	Germany	122	14	20	4	156
11	Olivier Beer	Switzerland	128	3	0	13	131
12	Roman Gladysh	Ukraine	106	15	0	10	121
13	Illart Zuazubiskar	Spain	56	3	40	17	99
14	Rui Oliveira	Portugal	106	0	-20	14	86
15	Anders Oddli	Norway	76	2	0	8	78
16	Ahmet Örken	Turkey	48	1	0	11	49
17	Tobias Wauch	Austria	60	0	-20	16	40
18	Ondřej Vendolský	Czech Republic	56	0	-40	20	16
19	Radoslav Konstantinov	Bulgaria	30	2	-20	19	12
20	Fintan Ryan	Ireland	22	5	-20	9	7
