= 2013 UEC European Track Championships – Men's omnium =

Men's omnium at the 2013 UEC European Track Championships
- UEC European Champion jersey
- Venue: Omnisport Apeldoorn, Apeldoorn
- Date: 19-20 October
- Competitors: 20 from 20 nations

Medalists
| gold medal | Viktor Manakov | Russia |
| silver medal | Tim Veldt | Netherlands |
| bronze medal | Martyn Irvine | Ireland |

The Men's omnium was held on 19 and 20 October 2013. 20 riders participated.

== Results ==
=== Flying lap ===
First event results:

| Rank | Name | Nation | Time | Notes |
|---|---|---|---|---|
| 1 | Tim Veldt | Netherlands | 13.288 | |
| 2 | Sam Harrison | Great Britain | 13.444 | |
| 3 | Davit Askurava | Georgia | 13.487 | |
| 4 | Alois Kaňkovský | Czech Republic | 13.489 | |
| 5 | Viktor Manakov | Russia | 13.501 | |
| 6 | Ioannis Spanopoulos | Greece | 13.597 | |
| 7 | Jasper De Buyst | Belgium | 13.610 | |
| 8 | Adrian Tekliński | Poland | 13.611 | |
| 9 | Unai Elorriaga | Spain | 13.612 | |
| 10 | Lucas Liss | Germany | 13.640 | |
| 11 | Olivier Beer | Switzerland | 13.755 | |
| 12 | Raman Tsishkou | Belarus | 13.786 | |
| 13 | Casper von Folsach | Denmark | 13.910 | |
| 14 | Martyn Irvine | Ireland | 13.922 | |
| 15 | Francesco Castegnaro | Italy | 13.984 | |
| 16 | Thomas Boudat | France | 14.026 | |
| 17 | Vladyslav Kreminskyi | Ukraine | 14.064 | |
| 18 | Stefan Matzner | Austria | 14.341 | |
| 19 | Eerik Idarand | Estonia | 14.407 | |
| 20 | Hiski Kanerva | Finland | 14.894 | |

=== Points race ===
Second event results:

| Rank | Name | Nation | Points | Finish order |
|---|---|---|---|---|
| 1 | Martyn Irvine | Ireland | 58 | 8 |
| 2 | Viktor Manakov | Russia | 52 | 13 |
| 3 | Sam Harrison | Great Britain | 45 | 5 |
| 4 | Unai Elorriaga | Spain | 37 | 4 |
| 5 | Casper von Folsach | Denmark | 34 | 14 |
| 6 | Olivier Beer | Switzerland | 31 | 10 |
| 7 | Raman Tsishkou | Belarus | 29 | 3 |
| 8 | Jasper De Buyst | Belgium | 28 | 1 |
| 9 | Lucas Liss | Germany | 28 | 6 |
| 10 | Ioannis Spanopoulos | Greece | 25 | 2 |
| 11 | Thomas Boudat | France | 23 | 7 |
| 12 | Tim Veldt | Netherlands | 10 | 17 |
| 13 | Francesco Castegnaro | Italy | 4 | 15 |
| 14 | Adrian Tekliński | Poland | 3 | 12 |
| 15 | Stefan Matzner | Austria | 3 | 16 |
| 16 | Vladyslav Kreminskyi | Ukraine | 1 | 9 |
| 17 | Alois Kaňkovský | Czech Republic | 1 | 11 |
| DNF | Eerik Idarand | Estonia | –20 | 18 |
| DNF | Davit Askurava | Georgia | −40 | 19 |
| DNF | Hiski Kanerva | Finland | −60 | 20 |

=== Elimination race ===
Third event results:

| Rank | Name | Nation |
|---|---|---|
| 1 | Tim Veldt | Netherlands |
| 2 | Viktor Manakov | Russia |
| 3 | Alois Kaňkovský | Czech Republic |
| 4 | Martyn Irvine | Ireland |
| 5 | Jasper De Buyst | Belgium |
| 6 | Olivier Beer | Switzerland |
| 7 | Thomas Boudat | France |
| 8 | Vladyslav Kreminskyi | Ukraine |
| 9 | Francesco Castegnaro | Italy |
| 10 | Ioannis Spanopoulos | Greece |
| 11 | Casper von Folsach | Denmark |
| 12 | Adrian Tekliński | Poland |
| 13 | Unai Elorriaga | Spain |
| 14 | Raman Tsishkou | Belarus |
| 15 | Lucas Liss | Germany |
| 16 | Sam Harrison | Great Britain |
| 17 | Eerik Idarand | Estonia |
| 18 | Stefan Matzner | Austria |
| 19 | Hiski Kanerva | Finland |
| 20 | Davit Askurava | Georgia |

=== Individual pursuit ===
Fourth event results:

| Rank | Name | Nation | Time | Notes |
|---|---|---|---|---|
| 1 | Viktor Manakov | Russia | 4:27.848 | |
| 2 | Casper von Folsach | Denmark | 4:28.995 | |
| 3 | Martyn Irvine | Ireland | 4:30.492 | |
| 4 | Unai Elorriaga | Spain | 4:32.049 | |
| 5 | Olivier Beer | Switzerland | 4:33.999 | |
| 6 | Jasper De Buyst | Belgium | 4:34.032 | |
| 7 | Tim Veldt | Netherlands | 4:34.594 | |
| 8 | Sam Harrison | Great Britain | 4:35.368 | |
| 9 | Lucas Liss | Germany | 4:36.776 | |
| 10 | Adrian Tekliński | Poland | 4:38.081 | |
| 11 | Ioannis Spanopoulos | Greece | 4:38.299 | |
| 12 | Raman Tsishkou | Belarus | 4:38.833 | |
| 13 | Alois Kaňkovský | Czech Republic | 4:43.036 | |
| 14 | Thomas Boudat | France | 4:44.241 | |
| 15 | Vladyslav Kreminskyi | Ukraine | 4:45.483 | |
| 16 | Francesco Castegnaro | Italy | 4:47.362 | |
| 17 | Stefan Matzner | Austria | 4:55.252 | |
| 18 | Eerik Idarand | Estonia | 4:57.613 | |
| 19 | Hiski Kanerva | Finland | 4:58.490 | |
| 20 | Davit Askurava | Georgia | 5:01.174 | |

=== Scratch race ===
Fifth event results:

| Rank | Name | Nation | Laps down |
|---|---|---|---|
| 1 | Viktor Manakov | Russia | |
| 2 | Thomas Boudat | France | |
| 3 | Tim Veldt | Netherlands | |
| 4 | Casper von Folsach | Denmark | |
| 5 | Alois Kaňkovský | Czech Republic | |
| 6 | Martyn Irvine | Ireland | |
| 7 | Olivier Beer | Switzerland | |
| 8 | Unai Elorriaga | Spain | |
| 9 | Francesco Castegnaro | Italy | |
| 10 | Jasper De Buyst | Belgium | |
| 11 | Sam Harrison | Great Britain | |
| 12 | Raman Tsishkou | Belarus | |
| 13 | Adrian Tekliński | Poland | |
| 14 | Ioannis Spanopoulos | Greece | |
| 15 | Lucas Liss | Germany | |
| 16 | Vladyslav Kreminskyi | Ukraine | |
| 17 | Stefan Matzner | Austria | |
| 18 | Hiski Kanerva | Finland | |
| DNF | Eerik Idarand | Estonia | |
| DNF | Davit Askurava | Georgia | |

=== Time trial ===
Sixth event results:

| Rank | Name | Nation | Time |
|---|---|---|---|
| 1 | Sam Harrison | Great Britain | 1:03.710 |
| 2 | Lucas Liss | Germany | 1:04.099 |
| 3 | Viktor Manakov | Russia | 1:04.379 |
| 4 | Jasper De Buyst | Belgium | 1:04.500 |
| 5 | Tim Veldt | Netherlands | 1:04.895 |
| 6 | Adrian Tekliński | Poland | 1:05.227 |
| 7 | Ioannis Spanopoulos | Greece | 1:05.577 |
| 8 | Olivier Beer | Switzerland | 1:05.600 |
| 9 | Alois Kaňkovský | Czech Republic | 1:05.909 |
| 10 | Unai Elorriaga | Spain | 1:05.971 |
| 11 | Casper von Folsach | Denmark | 1:06.075 |
| 12 | Martyn Irvine | Ireland | 1:06.281 |
| 13 | Thomas Boudat | France | 1:06.915 |
| 14 | Raman Tsishkou | Belarus | 1:07.123 |
| 15 | Davit Askurava | Georgia | 1:07.193 |
| 16 | Vladyslav Kreminskyi | Ukraine | 1:07.250 |
| 17 | Francesco Castegnaro | Italy | 1:08.634 |
| 18 | Stefan Matzner | Austria | 1:08.869 |
| 19 | Eerik Idarand | Estonia | 1:10.159 |
| 20 | Hiski Kanerva | Finland | 1:10.468 |

=== Overall results ===
Final standings were as follows:

| Rank | Rider | Nation | FL | PR | ER | IP | SR | TT | Total |
|---|---|---|---|---|---|---|---|---|---|
| 1st place, gold medalist(s) | Viktor Manakov | Russia | 5 | 2 | 2 | 1 | 1 | 3 | 14 |
| 2nd place, silver medalist(s) | Tim Veldt | Netherlands | 1 | 12 | 1 | 7 | 3 | 5 | 29 |
| 3rd place, bronze medalist(s) | Martyn Irvine | Ireland | 14 | 1 | 4 | 3 | 6 | 12 | 40 |
| 4 | Jasper De Buyst | Belgium | 7 | 8 | 5 | 6 | 10 | 4 | 40 |
| 5 | Sam Harrison | Great Britain | 2 | 3 | 16 | 8 | 11 | 1 | 41 |
| 6 | Olivier Beer | Switzerland | 11 | 6 | 6 | 5 | 7 | 8 | 43 |
| 7 | Casper von Folsach | Denmark | 13 | 5 | 11 | 2 | 4 | 11 | 46 |
| 8 | Unai Elorriaga | Spain | 9 | 4 | 13 | 4 | 8 | 10 | 48 |
| 9 | Alois Kaňkovský | Czech Republic | 4 | 17 | 3 | 13 | 5 | 9 | 51 |
| 10 | Ioannis Spanopoulos | Greece | 6 | 10 | 10 | 11 | 14 | 7 | 58 |
| 11 | Lucas Liss | Germany | 10 | 9 | 15 | 9 | 15 | 2 | 60 |
| 12 | Adrian Tekliński | Poland | 8 | 14 | 12 | 10 | 13 | 6 | 63 |
| 13 | Thomas Boudat | France | 16 | 11 | 7 | 14 | 2 | 13 | 63 |
| 14 | Raman Tsishkou | Belarus | 12 | 7 | 14 | 12 | 12 | 14 | 71 |
| 15 | Francesco Castegnaro | Italy | 15 | 13 | 9 | 16 | 9 | 17 | 79 |
| 16 | Vladyslav Kreminskyi | Ukraine | 17 | 16 | 8 | 15 | 16 | 16 | 88 |
| 17 | Stefan Matzner | Austria | 18 | 15 | 18 | 17 | 17 | 18 | 103 |
| 18 | Hiski Kanerva | Finland | 20 | 39 | 19 | 19 | 18 | 20 | 135 |
| 19 | Davit Askurava | Georgia | 3 | 40 | 20 | 20 | 40 | 15 | 138 |
| 20 | Eerik Idarand | Estonia | 19 | 38 | 17 | 18 | 39 | 19 | 150 |
