= 2014 UEC European Track Championships – Men's omnium =

Men's omnium at the 2014 UEC European Track Championships
- UEC European Champion jersey
- Venue: Vélodrome Amédée Détraux, Baie-Mahault
- Date: 17–18 October
- Competitors: 17 from 17 nations

Medalists
gold medal	Elia Viviani	Italy
silver medal	Jonathan Dibben	Great Britain
bronze medal	Unai Elorriaga	Spain

The Men's omnium was held on 17–18 October 2014. 17 riders competed across six events.

== Results ==
=== Scratch race ===
Standings after 1 event.

Rank	Name	Nation	Laps down	Event points
1	Elia Viviani	Italy		40
2	Artur Ershov	Russia		38
3	Unai Elorriaga	Spain		36
4	Jonathan Dibben	Great Britain		34
5	Lucas Liss	Germany	-1	32
6	Raman Tsishkou	Belarus	-1	30
7	Kenny De Ketele	Belgium	-1	28
8	Adrian Tekliński	Poland	-1	26
9	Gaël Suter	Switzerland	-1	24
10	Vladyslav Kreminskyi	Ukraine	-1	22
11	Martyn Irvine	Ireland	-1	20
12	Vivien Brisse	France	-1	18
13	Ioannis Spanopoulos	Greece	-1	16
14	František Sisr	Czech Republic	-1	14
15	Ahmet Örken	Turkey	-1	12
16	Tim Veldt	Netherlands	-1	10
17	Casper Pedersen	Denmark	-1	8

=== Individual pursuit ===
Standings after 2 events.

Rank	Name	Nation	Time	Event points	Overall rank	Subtotal
1	Jonathan Dibben	Great Britain	4:43.107	40	1	74
2	Adrian Tekliński	Poland	4:45.922	38	4	64
3	Unai Elorriaga	Spain	4:46.076	36	2	72
4	Artur Ershov	Russia	4:46.243	34	3	72
5	Tim Veldt	Netherlands	4:46.296	32	10	42
6	Kenny De Ketele	Belgium	4:47.765	30	7	58
7	Lucas Liss	Germany	4:48.757	28	6	60
8	Gaël Suter	Switzerland	4:48.915	26	9	50
9	Elia Viviani	Italy	4:49.497	24	5	64
10	Raman Tsishkou	Belarus	4:50.158	22	8	52
11	Martyn Irvine	Ireland	4:50.392	20	11	40
12	Vivien Brisse	France	4:52.269	18	12	36
13	František Sisr	Czech Republic	4:53.003	16	14	30
14	Ahmet Örken	Turkey	4:55.317	14	15	26
15	Vladyslav Kreminskyi	Ukraine	4:55.823	12	13	34
16	Casper Pedersen	Denmark	4:55.850	10	17	18
17	Ioannis Spanopoulos	Greece	4:57.500	8	16	24

=== Elimination race ===
Standings after 3 events.

Rank	Name	Nation	Event points	Overall rank	Subtotal
1	Elia Viviani	Italy	40	4	104
2	Gaël Suter	Switzerland	38	6	88
3	Artur Ershov	Russia	36	1	108
4	Unai Elorriaga	Spain	34	2	106
5	Vladyslav Kreminskyi	Ukraine	32	10	66
6	Jonathan Dibben	Great Britain	30	3	104
7	Vivien Brisse	France	28	11	64
8	Adrian Tekliński	Poland	26	5	90
9	Casper Pedersen	Denmark	24	15	42
10	Raman Tsishkou	Belarus	22	8	74
11	Kenny De Ketele	Belgium	20	7	78
12	Ioannis Spanopoulos	Greece	18	16	42
13	Ahmet Örken	Turkey	16	14	42
14	Tim Veldt	Netherlands	14	12	56
15	Lucas Liss	Germany	12	9	72
16	František Sisr	Czech Republic	10	17	40
17	Martyn Irvine	Ireland	8	13	48

=== 1km time trial ===
Standings after 4 events.

Rank	Name	Nation	Time	Event points	Overall rank	Subtotal
1	Lucas Liss	Germany	1:04.651	40	7	112
2	Adrian Tekliński	Poland	1:05.433	38	3	128
3	Gaël Suter	Switzerland	1:06.484	36	4	124
4	Martyn Irvine	Ireland	1:06.862	34	12	82
5	Casper Pedersen	Denmark	1:07.108	32	14	74
6	Elia Viviani	Italy	1:07.177	30	2	134
7	Artur Ershov	Russia	1:07.196	28	1	136
8	Tim Veldt	Netherlands	1:07.237	26	11	82
9	Raman Tsishkou	Belarus	1:07.506	24	9	98
10	Vladyslav Kreminskyi	Ukraine	1:07.585	22	10	88
11	Kenny De Ketele	Belgium	1:07.769	20	8	98
12	Jonathan Dibben	Great Britain	1:07.886	18	5	122
13	Ioannis Spanopoulos	Greece	1:07.887	16	15	58
14	Vivien Brisse	France	1:08.021	14	13	78
15	Unai Elorriaga	Spain	1:08.743	12	6	118
16	František Sisr	Czech Republic	1:09.696	10	16	50
17	Ahmet Örken	Turkey	1:10.024	8	17	50

=== Flying lap ===
Standings after 5 events.

Rank	Name	Nation	Time	Event points	Overall rank	Subtotal
1	Lucas Liss	Germany	18.319	40	5	152
2	Elia Viviani	Italy	18.719	38	1	172
3	Adrian Tekliński	Poland	18.872	36	2	164
4	Gaël Suter	Switzerland	18.953	34	4	158
5	Casper Pedersen	Denmark	18.973	32	11	106
6	Tim Veldt	Netherlands	19.069	30	10	112
7	Jonathan Dibben	Great Britain	19.107	28	6	150
8	Artur Ershov	Russia	19.164	26	3	162
9	Ioannis Spanopoulos	Greece	19.214	24	15	82
10	Kenny De Ketele	Belgium	19.248	22	8	120
11	Martyn Irvine	Ireland	19.254	20	12	102
12	Unai Elorriaga	Spain	19.271	18	7	136
13	Raman Tsishkou	Belarus	19.316	16	9	114
14	Vivien Brisse	France	19.434	14	14	92
15	Vladyslav Kreminskyi	Ukraine	19.813	12	13	100
16	František Sisr	Czech Republic	20.008	10	16	60
17	Ahmet Örken	Turkey	20.455	8	17	58

=== Points race and final standings ===
Riders' points from the previous 5 events were carried into the points race, in which the final standings were decided.

Overall rank	Name	Nation	Subtotal	Sprint points	Lap points	Finish order	Final standings
1st place, gold medalist(s)	Elia Viviani	Italy	172	27	20	12	219
2nd place, silver medalist(s)	Jonathan Dibben	Great Britain	150	28	20	13	198
3rd place, bronze medalist(s)	Unai Elorriaga	Spain	136	23	20	8	179
4	Adrian Tekliński	Poland	164	12	0	2	176
5	Gaël Suter	Switzerland	158	14	0	5	172
6	Artur Ershov	Russia	162	9	0	9	171
7	Lucas Liss	Germany	152	16	0	3	168
8	Casper Pedersen	Denmark	106	20	20	1	146
9	Kenny De Ketele	Belgium	120	6	20	4	146
10	Martyn Irvine	Ireland	102	5	0	16	123
11	Raman Tsishkou	Belarus	114	5	0	10	119
12	Tim Veldt	Netherlands	112	2	0	14	114
13	Vivien Brisse	France	92	20	0	15	112
14	František Sisr	Czech Republic	60	8	20	6	88
15	Vladyslav Kreminskyi	Ukraine	100	6	-20	11	86
16	Ioannis Spanopoulos	Greece	82	3	0	7	85
—	Ahmet Örken	Turkey	58	0	-20	—	DNF
