= 2014 UCI Track Cycling World Championships – Men's omnium =

The Men's omnium at the 2014 UCI Track Cycling World Championships was held on 28 February and 1 March 2014. 18 athletes participated in the contest. The final standings were determined by adding ranks in the six events; the rider with the lowest cumulative score won the gold medal.

== Medalists ==
Gold	Thomas Boudat (FRA)
Silver	Tim Veldt (NED)
Bronze	Viktor Manakov (RUS)

== Results ==
=== Overall results ===
Rank	Rider	FL	PR	ER	IP	SR	TT	Total
1st place, gold medalist(s)	Thomas Boudat (FRA)	10	1	1	7	2	3	24
2nd place, silver medalist(s)	Tim Veldt (NED)	2	9	7	5	3	2	28
3rd place, bronze medalist(s)	Viktor Manakov (RUS)							32
4	Aaron Gate (NZL)							34
5	Ed Clancy (GBR)	1	13	8	11	1	1	35
6	Juan Esteban Arango (COL)							38
7	Olivier Beer (SUI)							55
8	Casper von Folsach (DEN)							56
9	Unai Elorriaga (ESP)							56
10	Raman Tsishkou (BLR)							57
11	Ondřej Rybín (CZE)							57
12	Eiya Hashimoto (JPN)							68
13	Luke Davison (AUS)							71
14	Vladislav Kreminskyi (UKR)							73
15	Jacob Duehring (USA)							74
16	Jose Aguirre (MEX)							91
17	Francesco Castegnaro (ITA)							93
–	Jasper De Buyst (BEL)							DSQ

FL: 250m flying lap. PR: Points race. ER: Elimination race.
IP: 4000m individual pursuit. SR: Scratch race. TT: 1000m time trial.

=== Flying lap ===
The flying lap was held at 12:35.

Rank	Name	Nation	Time
1	Ed Clancy	Great Britain	12.806
2	Tim Veldt	Netherlands	13.163
3	Luke Davison	Australia	13.187
4	Jasper De Buyst	Belgium	13.229
5	Olivier Beer	Switzerland	13.265
6	Viktor Manakov	Russia	13.267
7	Ondřej Rybín	Czech Republic	13.378
8	Unai Elorriaga	Spain	13.414
9	Aaron Gate	New Zealand	13.438
10	Thomas Boudat	France	13.509
11	Juan Esteban Arango	Colombia	13.558
12	Raman Tsishkou	Belarus	13.586
13	Eiya Hashimoto	Japan	13.628
14	Casper von Folsach	Denmark	13.673
15	Jacob Duehring	United States	13.679
16	Francesco Castegnaro	Italy	13.687
17	Vladislav Kreminskyi	Ukraine	13.792
18	José Aguirre	Mexico	13.842

=== Points race ===
The points race was held at 14:50.

Rank	Name	Nation	Points
1	Thomas Boudat	France	35
2	Unai Elorriaga	Spain	34
3	Casper von Folsach	Denmark	33
4	Eiya Hashimoto	Japan	32
5	Juan Esteban Arango	Colombia	28
6	Viktor Manakov	Russia	25
7	Jacob Duehring	United States	24
8	Jasper De Buyst	Belgium	15
9	Tim Veldt	Netherlands	12
10	Aaron Gate	New Zealand	9
11	Olivier Beer	Switzerland	8
12	Francesco Castegnaro	Italy	7
13	Ed Clancy	Great Britain	5
14	Ondřej Rybín	Czech Republic	3
15	Raman Tsishkou	Belarus	2
16	José Aguirre	Mexico	0
17	Vladislav Kreminskyi	Ukraine	0
18	Luke Davison	Australia	0

=== Elimination race ===
The elimination race was held at 21:35.

Rank	Name	Nation
1	Thomas Boudat	France
2	Aaron Gate	New Zealand
3	Viktor Manakov	Russia
4	Eiya Hashimoto	Japan
5	Raman Tsishkou	Belarus
6	Juan Esteban Arango	Colombia
7	Tim Veldt	Netherlands
8	Ed Clancy	Great Britain
9	Vladislav Kreminskyi	Ukraine
10	Ondřej Rybín	Czech Republic
11	Olivier Beer	Switzerland
12	Jacob Duehring	United States
13	Casper von Folsach	Denmark
14	Unai Elorriaga	Spain
15	José Aguirre	Mexico
16	Luke Davison	Australia
17	Francesco Castegnaro	Italy
DSQ	Jasper De Buyst	Belgium

=== Individual pursuit ===
The individual pursuit was held at 13:45.

Rank	Name	Nation	Time
1	Aaron Gate	New Zealand	4:23.698
2	Casper von Folsach	Denmark	4:25.107
3	Juan Esteban Arango	Colombia	4:25.612
4	Viktor Manakov	Russia	4:25.885
5	Tim Veldt	Netherlands	4:27.411
6	Raman Tsishkou	Belarus	4:30.524
7	Thomas Boudat	France	4:31.930
8	Olivier Beer	Switzerland	4:32.078
9	Luke Davison	Australia	4:33.593
10	Unai Elorriaga	Spain	4:34.545
11	Ed Clancy	Great Britain	4:34.983
12	Ondřej Rybín	Czech Republic	4:39.509
13	Jacob Duehring	United States	4:41.062
14	Vladislav Kreminskyi	Ukraine	4:41.145
15	Eiya Hashimoto	Japan	4:41.989
16	Francesco Castegnaro	Italy	4:49.106
17	José Aguirre	Mexico	4:54.473

=== Scratch race ===
The Scratch race was held at 19:05.

Rank	Name	Nation	Laps down
1	Ed Clancy	Great Britain	
2	Thomas Boudat	France	
3	Tim Veldt	Netherlands	
4	Vladislav Kreminskyi	Ukraine	
5	Ondřej Rybín	Czech Republic	
6	Viktor Manakov	Russia	
7	Aaron Gate	New Zealand	
8	Raman Tsishkou	Belarus	
9	Juan Esteban Arango	Colombia	
10	José Aguirre	Mexico	
11	Casper von Folsach	Denmark	
12	Unai Elorriaga	Spain	
13	Jacob Duehring	United States	
14	Olivier Beer	Switzerland	
15	Francesco Castegnaro	Italy	
16	Eiya Hashimoto	Japan	
17	Luke Davison	Australia	−1

=== 1 km time trial ===
The 1 km time trial was held at 21:05.

Rank	Name	Nation	Time
1	Ed Clancy	Great Britain	1:01.691
2	Tim Veldt	Netherlands	1:03.134
3	Thomas Boudat	France	1:03.396
4	Juan Esteban Arango	Colombia	1:03.404
5	Aaron Gate	New Zealand	1:03.655
6	Olivier Beer	Switzerland	1:03.682
7	Viktor Manakov	Russia	1:03.863
8	Luke Davison	Australia	1:03.987
9	Ondřej Rybín	Czech Republic	1:04.331
10	Unai Elorriaga	Spain	1:05.451
11	Raman Tsishkou	Belarus	1:05.519
12	Vladislav Kreminskyi	Ukraine	1:05.853
13	Casper von Folsach	Denmark	1:05.866
14	Jacob Duehring	United States	1:06.297
15	José Aguirre	Mexico	1:06.356
16	Eiya Hashimoto	Japan	1:06.937
17	Francesco Castegnaro	Italy	1:08.765

=== Final standings ===
After all events.

Rank	Name	Nation	Points
1st place, gold medalist(s)	Thomas Boudat	France	24
2nd place, silver medalist(s)	Tim Veldt	Netherlands	28
3rd place, bronze medalist(s)	Viktor Manakov	Russia	32
4	Aaron Gate	New Zealand	34
5	Ed Clancy	Great Britain	35
6	Juan Esteban Arango	Colombia	38
7	Olivier Beer	Switzerland	55
8	Casper von Folsach	Denmark	56
9	Unai Elorriaga	Spain	56
10	Raman Tsishkou	Belarus	57
11	Ondřej Rybín	Czech Republic	57
12	Eiya Hashimoto	Japan	68
13	Luke Davison	Australia	71
14	Vladislav Kreminskyi	Ukraine	73
15	Jacob Duehring	United States	74
16	José Aguirre	Mexico	91
17	Francesco Castegnaro	Italy	93
—	Jasper De Buyst	Belgium	DSQ
