= 2012 European Track Championships – Men's omnium =

UEC European Champion jersey

The Men's omnium was held on 20 October 2012. 13 riders participated.

== Medalists ==
| Gold | Lucas Liss (GER) |
| Silver | Artur Ershov (RUS) |
| Bronze | Gediminas Bagdonas (LTU) |

== Results ==
=== Overall results ===
After six events.

| Rank | Rider | Nation | FL | PR | ER | IP | SR | TT | Total |
|---|---|---|---|---|---|---|---|---|---|
| 1st place, gold medalist(s) | Lucas Liss | Germany | 3 | 3 | 4 | 3 | 3 | 1 | 17 |
| 2nd place, silver medalist(s) | Artur Ershov | Russia | 2 | 8 | 1 | 1 | 6 | 2 | 20 |
| 3rd place, bronze medalist(s) | Gediminas Bagdonas | Lithuania | 9 | 1 | 6 | 2 | 11 | 5 | 34 |
| 4 | Roy Eefting | Netherlands | 5 | 9 | 7 | 4 | 9 | 3 | 37 |
| 5 | Paolo Simion | Italy | 8 | 5 | 3 | 8 | 7 | 7 | 38 |
| 6 | Mateusz Nowak | Poland | 6 | 11 | 2 | 7 | 10 | 4 | 40 |
| 7 | Alois Kaňkovský | Czech Republic | 1 | 10 | 9 | 9 | 5 | 6 | 40 |
| 8 | Oleksandr Lobov | Ukraine | 12 | 6 | 5 | 5 | 2 | 11 | 41 |
| 9 | Nicky Cocquyt | Belgium | 10 | 2 | 10 | 1 | 1 | 9 | 42 |
| 10 | Raman Tsishkou | Belarus | 7 | 7 | 11 | 6 | 4 | 8 | 43 |
| 11 | Gaël Suter | Switzerland | 4 | 4 | 8 | 11 | 8 | 10 | 45 |
| 12 | Eerik Idarand | Estonia | 11 | 25 | 12 | 12 | 12 | 12 | 84 |
| 13 | Mika Simola | Finland | 13 | 25 | 13 | 13 | 12 | 13 | 91 |

=== Flying lap ===
It was held at 12:54.

| Rank | Name | Nation | Time | Notes |
|---|---|---|---|---|
| 1 | Alois Kaňkovský | Czech Republic | 13.403 | |
| 2 | Artur Ershov | Russia | 13.456 | |
| 3 | Lucas Liss | Germany | 13.538 | |
| 4 | Gaël Suter | Switzerland | 13.691 | |
| 5 | Roy Eefting | Netherlands | 13.775 | |
| 6 | Mateusz Nowak | Poland | 13.851 | |
| 7 | Raman Tsishkou | Belarus | 13.854 | |
| 8 | Paolo Simion | Italy | 13.991 | |
| 9 | Gediminas Bagdonas | Lithuania | 13.995 | |
| 10 | Nicky Cocquyt | Belgium | 14.271 | |
| 11 | Eerik Idarand | Estonia | 14.467 | |
| 12 | Oleksandr Lobov | Ukraine | 14.654 | |
| 13 | Mika Simola | Finland | 14.851 | |

=== Points race ===
It was held at 19:42.

| Rank | Name | Nation | Laps | Points |
|---|---|---|---|---|
| 1 | Gediminas Bagdonas | Lithuania | +2 | 56 |
| 2 | Nicky Cocquyt | Belgium | +1 | 41 |
| 3 | Lucas Liss | Germany | +1 | 39 |
| 4 | Gaël Suter | Switzerland | +1 | 32 |
| 5 | Paolo Simion | Italy | +1 | 31 |
| 6 | Oleksandr Lobov | Ukraine | +1 | 28 |
| 7 | Raman Tsishkou | Belarus | +1 | 26 |
| 8 | Artur Ershov | Russia | 0 | 14 |
| 9 | Roy Eefting | Netherlands | 0 | 9 |
| 10 | Alois Kaňkovský | Czech Republic | 0 | 8 |
| 11 | Mateusz Nowak | Poland | 0 | 8 |
| – | Eerik Idarand | Estonia | − 2 | DNF |
| – | Mika Simola | Finland | −2 | DNF |

=== Elimination race ===
It was held at 21:18.

| Rank | Name | Nation |
|---|---|---|
| 1 | Artur Ershov | Russia |
| 2 | Mateusz Nowak | Poland |
| 3 | Paolo Simion | Italy |
| 4 | Lucas Liss | Germany |
| 5 | Oleksandr Lobov | Ukraine |
| 6 | Gediminas Bagdonas | Lithuania |
| 7 | Roy Eefting | Netherlands |
| 8 | Gaël Suter | Switzerland |
| 9 | Alois Kaňkovský | Czech Republic |
| 10 | Nicky Cocquyt | Belgium |
| 10 | Raman Tsishkou | Belarus |
| 12 | Eerik Idarand | Estonia |
| 13 | Mika Simola | Finland |

=== Individual pursuit ===
It was held at 10:25.

| Rank | Name | Nation | Time | Notes |
|---|---|---|---|---|
| 1 | Artur Ershov | Russia | 4:23.835 | |
| 2 | Gediminas Bagdonas | Lithuania | 4:31.289 | |
| 3 | Lucas Liss | Germany | 4:32.908 | |
| 4 | Roy Eefting | Netherlands | 4:35.102 | |
| 5 | Oleksandr Lobov | Ukraine | 4:35.499 | |
| 6 | Raman Tsishkou | Belarus | 4:36.290 | |
| 7 | Mateusz Nowak | Poland | 4:37.408 | |
| 8 | Paolo Simion | Italy | 4:38.063 | |
| 9 | Alois Kaňkovský | Czech Republic | 4:42.123 | |
| 10 | Nicky Cocquyt | Belgium | 4:44.262 | |
| 11 | Gaël Suter | Switzerland | 4:45.089 | |
| 12 | Eerik Idarand | Estonia | 4:56.585 | |
| – | Mika Simola | Finland | | REL |

=== Scratch race ===
It was held at 12:16.

| Rank | Name | Nation | Laps down |
|---|---|---|---|
| 1 | Nicky Cocquyt | Belgium | |
| 2 | Oleksandr Lobov | Ukraine | −1 |
| 3 | Lucas Liss | Germany | −2 |
| 4 | Raman Tsishkou | Belarus | −2 |
| 5 | Alois Kaňkovský | Czech Republic | −2 |
| 6 | Artur Ershov | Russia | −2 |
| 7 | Paolo Simion | Italy | −2 |
| 8 | Gaël Suter | Switzerland | −2 |
| 9 | Roy Eefting | Netherlands | −2 |
| 10 | Mateusz Nowak | Poland | −2 |
| 11 | Gediminas Bagdonas | Lithuania | −2 |
| 12 | Eerik Idarand | Estonia | −3 |
| 13 | Mika Simola | Finland | −3 |

=== 1000m time trial ===
It was held at 17:20.

| Rank | Name | Nation | Time |
|---|---|---|---|
| 1 | Lucas Liss | Germany | 1:03.803 |
| 2 | Artur Ershov | Russia | 1:04.110 |
| 3 | Roy Eefting | Netherlands | 1:04.718 |
| 4 | Mateusz Nowak | Poland | 1:05.130 |
| 5 | Gediminas Bagdonas | Lithuania | 1:05.163 |
| 6 | Alois Kaňkovský | Czech Republic | 1:05.166 |
| 7 | Paolo Simion | Italy | 1:05.752 |
| 8 | Raman Tsishkou | Belarus | 1:06.580 |
| 9 | Nicky Cocquyt | Belgium | 1:06.729 |
| 10 | Gaël Suter | Switzerland | 1:07.744 |
| 11 | Oleksandr Lobov | Ukraine | 1:08.431 |
| 12 | Eerik Idarand | Estonia | 1:10.720 |
| 13 | Mika Simola | Finland | 1:11.012 |
