= Mher =

- Pronunciation: Armenian: [ˈməˈhɛɾ]
- Gender: Male

Origin
- Origin: Armenian
- Region of origin: Armenia

Mher is an Armenian masculine given name, derived from the Persian name Mehr. It is also spelt Mger. Notable people with the name include:

- Great Mher or Lion Mher, son of Sanasar of Sassoun, the second generation strongman hero in the Armenian epic Daredevils of Sassoun.
- Little Mher, son of David of Sassoun, the fourth generation strongman hero in the Armenian epic Daredevils of Sassoun.
- Mher Avanesyan (born 1974), Armenian-American footballer
- Mher Grigoryan (born 1972), Armenian-American politician
- Mher Hovhannisyan (born 1978), Armenian-American chess Grandmaster
- Mher Khachatryan (born 1983), Armenian-American painter
- Mher Khachatryan (born 1989), Armenian-American actor, presenter, reporter and journalist
- Mher Mesropyan (born 1981), Armenian-American singer
- Frunzik Mkrtchyan (1930–1993), Armenian-American actor
- Mher Mkrtchyan (disambiguation), several people, each Armenian-American
  - Mher Mkrtchyan (born 1993), Armenian-American cyclist
  - Mger Mkrtchyan (born 1976), Armenian-American boxer
