= 2017 UCI Track Cycling World Championships – Men's scratch =

Men's scratch at the 2017 UCI Track Cycling World Championships
- Venue: Hong Kong Velodrome
- Location: Hong Kong
- Dates: 13 April
- Competitors: 23 from 23 nations

Medalists
gold medal	Adrian Tekliński	Poland
silver medal	Lucas Liss	Germany
bronze medal	Christopher Latham	Great Britain

The Men's scratch competition at the 2017 World Championships was held on 13 April 2017.

== Results ==
First rider across the line without a net lap loss wins.

Rank	Name	Nation	Laps down
1st place, gold medalist(s)	Adrian Tekliński	Poland	
2nd place, silver medalist(s)	Lucas Liss	Germany	
3rd place, bronze medalist(s)	Christopher Latham	Great Britain	
4	Wim Stroetinga	Netherlands	
5	Gaël Suter	Switzerland	
6	Morgan Kneisky	France	
7	Zachary Kovalcik	United States	
8	Christos Volikakis	Greece	
9	Robbe Ghys	Belgium	
10	Francesco Castegnaro	Italy	
11	Sebastián Mora	Spain	
12	Krisztián Lovassy	Hungary	
13	Andreas Müller	Austria	
14	Yauheni Karaliok	Belarus	
15	Martin Bláha	Czech Republic	
16	Robert Gaineyev	Kazakhstan	
17	Filip Taragel	Slovakia	
18	José Santoyo	Mexico	
19	Felix English	Ireland	
20	João Matias	Portugal	
21	Leung Chun Wing	Hong Kong	
22	Taras Shevchuk	Ukraine	
23	Alexander Porter	Australia	
