= List of Finnish records in track cycling =

The following are the national records in track cycling in Finland maintained by the Cycling Union of Finland (Finnish: Suomen Pyöräilyunioni).

== Men ==
Event	Record	Athlete	Date	Meet	Place	Ref
Flying 200 m time trial						
250 m time trial (standing start)	20.016	Mika Simola	3 March 2016	World Championships	London, United Kingdom	
Team sprint						
1 km time trial						
1 km time trial (sea level)	1:04.641	Mika Simola	3 March 2016	World Championships	London, United Kingdom	
4000m individual pursuit						
4000m team pursuit						

== Women ==
Event	Record	Athlete	Date	Meet	Place	Ref
Flying 200 m time trial						
250 m time trial (standing start)	22.489	Pia Pensaari	19 October 2016	European Championships	Saint-Quentin-en-Yvelines, France	
500 m time trial						
500 m time trial (sea level)	38.453	Pia Pensaari	19 October 2016	European Championships	Saint-Quentin-en-Yvelines, France	
3000m individual pursuit	3:39.517	Pia Pensaari	3 March 2018	World Championships	Apeldoorn, Netherlands	
3000m team pursuit						
