= EvoPro Racing =

Irish cycling team

Team information
- UCI code: EVO
- Registered: Ireland
- Founded: 2019
- Discipline: Road
- Status: UCI Continental
- Bicycles: Guerciotti
- Components: FSA; Vision; Sram
- Website: Team home page

Key personnel
- General manager: Patrick John Nolan
- Team manager: Morgan Fox

Team name history
- 2019–: EvoPro Racing

EvoPro Racing is an Irish UCI Continental cycling team focusing on road bicycle racing. The Irish team is run by ex-professional Morgan Fox.

== Team roster ==
As of 21 March 2022.

| Rider | Date of birth |
|---|---|
| Rhys Britton (GBR) | 13 May 1999 (age 27) |
| Liam Curley (IRL) | 26 February 2000 (age 26) |
| Daire Feeley (IRL) | 4 December 1996 (age 29) |
| Dylan Guinet (FRA) | 29 April 1997 (age 29) |
| Cian Keogh (IRL) | 6 April 1999 (age 27) |
| Eamon Lucas (USA) | 15 October 1992 (age 33) |
| Conor McCann (IRL) | 8 February 1998 (age 28) |
| Conn McDunphy (IRL) | 3 February 1997 (age 29) |

| Rider | Date of birth |
|---|---|
| Mitchell McLaughlin (IRL) | 18 March 1998 (age 28) |
| Tom Moriarty (IRL) | 30 November 2002 (age 23) |
| JB Murphy (IRL) | 22 October 1999 (age 26) |
| Seán Nolan (IRL) | 12 September 2001 (age 24) |
| Fintan Ryan (IRL) | 24 September 1996 (age 29) |
| Michael Van Staeyen (BEL) | 13 August 1988 (age 38) |
| Maarten Verheyen (BEL) | 22 June 1999 (age 27) |

== Major wins ==
2019
Gravel and Tar, Luke Mudgway
Overall New Zealand Cycle Classic, Aaron Gate

Stage 1, Aaron Gate

Stage 1 Belgrade Banjaluka, Aaron Gate
Stages 2 & 3 Belgrade Banjaluka, Wouter Wippert
Stage 3 Rhône-Alpes Isère Tour, Harry Sweeny
Stage 5 Tour de Hongrie, Wouter Wippert
