= 2016 UEC European Track Championships – Men's scratch =

Men's scratch race at the 2016 UEC European Track Championships
- UEC European Champion jersey
- Venue: Vélodrome de Saint-Quentin-en-Yvelines, Yvelines
- Date: 19 October
- Competitors: 22 from 22 nations

Medalists
gold medal	Gaël Suter	Switzerland
silver medal	Adrian Tekliński	Poland
bronze medal	Wim Stroetinga	Netherlands

The Men's scratch was held on 19 October 2016.

== Results ==
Rank	Name	Nation	Laps down
1st place, gold medalist(s)	Gaël Suter	Switzerland	
2nd place, silver medalist(s)	Adrian Tekliński	Poland	
3rd place, bronze medalist(s)	Wim Stroetinga	Netherlands	-1
4	Christos Volikakis	Greece	-1
5	Felix English	Ireland	-1
6	Andreas Müller	Austria	-1
7	Alex Buttazzoni	Italy	-1
8	Morgan Kneisky	France	-1
9	Jiří Hochmann	Czech Republic	-1
10	Filip Taragel	Slovakia	-1
11	Lindsay De Vylder	Belgium	-1
12	Moritz Malcharek	Germany	-1
13	Anders Oddli	Norway	-1
14	Anton Muzychkin	Belarus	-1
15	Mher Mkrtchyan	Armenia	-1
16	Sebastián Mora	Spain	-1
17	Taras Shevchuk	Ukraine	-1
18	Krisztián Lovassy	Hungary	-1
19	Maxim Piskunov	Russia	-1
20	Oliver Wood	Great Britain	-1
21	Antonio Barbio	Portugal	-1
22	Nikolay Genov	Bulgaria	DNF
