= Mher Mkrtchyan =

Mher Mkrtchyan may refer to:

- Frunzik Mkrtchyan (Mher Mkrtchyan, 1930–1993), Soviet Armenian actor
- Mher Mkrtchyan (cyclist) (born 1993), Armenian track cyclist
