= Viktor Manakov (cyclist, born 1992) =

Russian cyclist

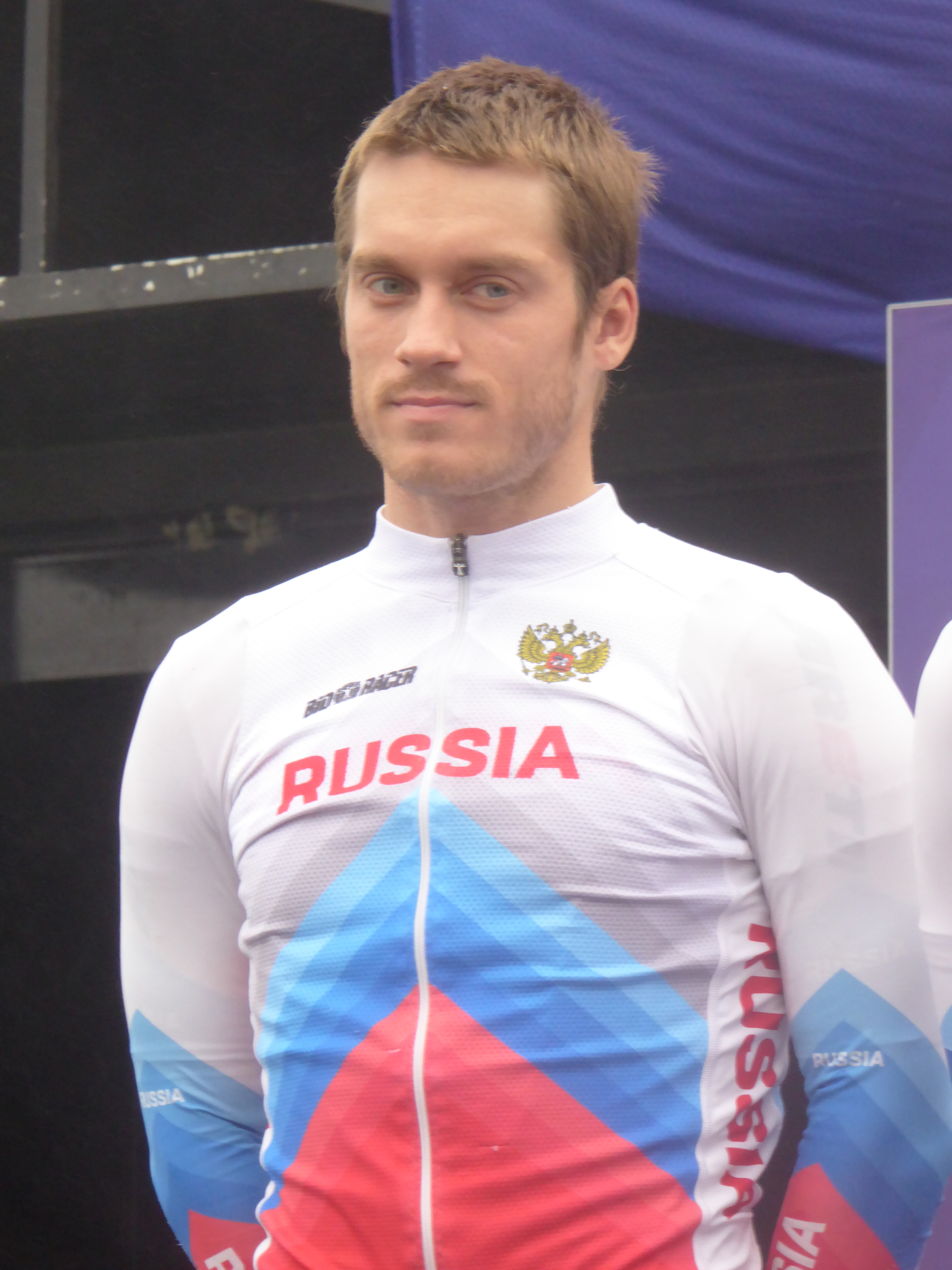
- Manakov at the 2018 European Road Cycling Championships

Personal information
- Full name: Viktor Viktorovich Manakov; Russian: Виктор Викторович Манаков
- Born: 9 June 1992 (age 34) Saint Petersburg, Russia
- Height: 1.8 m (5 ft 11 in)
- Weight: 77 kg (170 lb)

Cycling career
- Sport: Cycling
- Current team: Pingtan International Tourism Island Cycling Team
- Disciplines: Road; Track
- Role: Rider

Amateur teams
- 2018: Marathon–Tula
- 2019: Fiberli Antalyaspor
- 2020: Marathon–Tula
- 2020: Moscow
- 2021: Dynamo Moscow
- 2023: Obidos Cycling Team

Professional teams
- 2012–2013: RusVelo
- 2014: Itera–Katusha
- 2015: Leopard Development Team
- 2016: Gazprom–RusVelo
- 2022: ABTF–Feirense
- 2024–: Pingtan International Tourism Island Cycling Team
Medal record
Representing Russia
Men's track cycling
World Championships
Bronze medal – third place	2014 Cali	Omnium
European Championships
Gold medal – first place	2013 Apeldoorn	Omnium
Bronze medal – third place	2011 Apeldoorn	Team pursuit

Viktor Viktorovich Manakov (Russian: Виктор Викторович Манаков; born 9 June 1992) is a Russian professional racing cyclist, who rides for UCI Continental team Pingtan International Tourism Island Cycling Team. His parents Viktor Manakov and Jolanta Polikevičiūtė, and his aunt Rasa Polikevičiūtė were all professional cyclists.

At the 2007 European Youth Summer Olympic Festival, Manakov represented Lithuania, but later switched to internationally compete for Russia.

== Major results ==
=== Road ===
2009
7th Overall Tour de Lorraine Juniors

1st Stage 2

7th Overall Peace Race Juniors
2010
4th Overall La Coupe du Président de la Ville de Grudziądz

1st Stage 1a (TTT)

2011
6th Tallinn–Tartu GP
2012
1st Stage 5 Grand Prix of Adygeya
2013
2nd Time trial, National Under-23 Road Championships
8th Trofeo Palma
2014
6th Chrono Champenois
2015
6th Overall Bałtyk–Karkonosze Tour
2018
4th Overall Five Rings of Moscow
5th Time trial, National Road Championships
5th Overall Bałtyk–Karkonosze Tour
2019
1st Stage 3b (TTT) Vuelta Ciclista a Costa Rica
2020
3rd Time trial, National Road Championships

=== Track ===
2009
1st Team pursuit, UCI Juniors Track World Championships
1st Team pursuit, UEC European Junior Track Championships
2010
UEC European Junior Track Championships

1st Individual pursuit
3rd Omnium

3rd Individual pursuit, UCI Junior Track Cycling World Championships
2011
3rd Team pursuit, UEC European Track Championships
2012
UEC European Under-23 Track Championships

1st Omnium
1st Team pursuit

2013
1st Omnium, UEC European Track Championships
National Track Championships

1st Omnium
1st Madison (with Ivan Savitskiy)
2nd Team pursuit

2014
UEC European Under-23 Track Championships

2nd Omnium
2nd Team pursuit

3rd Omnium, UCI Track Cycling World Championships
2015
1st Omnium, 2015–16 UCI Track Cycling World Cup, Cali
2017
3rd Madison, 2016–17 UCI Track Cycling World Cup, Cali (with Andrey Sazanov)
