= 2007 Rotterdam Sprint Cup =

The 2007 Rotterdam Sprint Cup was held from 4 to 9 January 2007 in Rotterdam Ahoy Sportpaleis in Rotterdam. The event was held for the first time and scheduled together with the 2007 Six Days of Rotterdam. Six of the world's best track sprint cyclists challenged each other in several sprint disciplines over six days, resulting in a total ranking.

== Day 1 ==
| No. | 200 m time trial | Time | Points | Total ranking | Points |
|---|---|---|---|---|---|
| 1 | (Netherlands) Theo Bos | 10.822 | 6 | (Netherlands) Theo Bos | 6 |
| 2 | (Netherlands) Teun Mulder | 10.872 | 5 | (Netherlands) Teun Mulder | 5 |
| 3 | (Netherlands) Tim Veldt | 10.902 | 4 | (Netherlands) Tim Veldt | 4 |
| 4 | (Italy) Roberto Chiappa | 10.933 | 3 | (Italy) Roberto Chiappa | 3 |
| 5 | (Scotland) Craig MacLean | 10.946 | 2 | (Scotland) Craig MacLean | 2 |
| 6 | (Germany) Jan van Eijden | 11.100 | 1 | (Germany) Jan van Eijden | 1 |

| No. | sprint | Points | Total ranking | Points |
|---|---|---|---|---|
| 1 | (Netherlands) Theo Bos | 10 | (Netherlands) Theo Bos | 16 |
| 2 | (Netherlands) Teun Mulder | 7 | (Netherlands) Teun Mulder | 12 |
| 3 | (Italy) Roberto Chiappa | 5 | (Italy) Roberto Chiappa | 8 |
| 4 | (Netherlands) Tim Veldt | 3 | (Netherlands) Tim Veldt | 7 |
| 5 | (Scotland) Craig MacLean | 2 | (Scotland) Craig MacLean | 4 |
| 6 | (Germany) Jan van Eijden | 1 | (Germany) Jan van Eijden | 2 |

| No. | keirin | Points | Total ranking | Points |
|---|---|---|---|---|
| 1 | (Italy) Roberto Chiappa | 10 | (Netherlands) Theo Bos | 19 |
| 2 | (Netherlands) Tim Veldt | 7 | (Italy) Roberto Chiappa | 18 |
| 3 | (Netherlands) Teun Mulder | 5 | (Netherlands) Teun Mulder | 17 |
| 4 | (Netherlands) Theo Bos | 3 | (Netherlands) Tim Veldt | 14 |
| 5 | (Germany) Jan van Eijden | 2 | (Scotland) Craig MacLean | 5 |
| 6 | (Scotland) Craig MacLean | 1 | (Germany) Jan van Eijden | 4 |

| No. | team sprint | | Points | Total ranking | Points |
|---|---|---|---|---|---|
| 1 | (Netherlands) Theo Bos | 33.922 | 6 | (Netherlands) Theo Bos | 25 |
| 1 | (Netherlands) Tim Veldt | 33.922 | 6 | (Netherlands) Teun Mulder | 23 |
| 1 | (Netherlands) Teun Mulder | 33.922 | 6 | (Italy) Roberto Chiappa | 21 |
| 2 | (Italy) Roberto Chiappa | 34.932 | 3 | (Netherlands) Tim Veldt | 20 |
| 2 | (Germany) Jan van Eijden | 34.932 | 3 | (Scotland) Craig MacLean | 8 |
| 2 | (Scotland) Craig MacLean | 34.932 | 3 | (Germany) Jan van Eijden | 7 |

== Day 2 ==
| No. | keirin | Points | Total ranking | Points |
|---|---|---|---|---|
| 1 | (Scotland) Craig MacLean | 10 | (Netherlands) Theo Bos | 30 |
| 2 | (Netherlands) Teun Mulder | 7 | (Netherlands) Teun Mulder | 30 |
| 3 | (Netherlands) Theo Bos | 5 | (Italy) Roberto Chiappa | 23 |
| 4 | (Netherlands) Tim Veldt | 3 | (Netherlands) Tim Veldt | 23 |
| 5 | (Italy) Roberto Chiappa | 2 | (Scotland) Craig MacLean | 18 |
| 6 | (Germany) Jan van Eijden | 1 | (Germany) Jan van Eijden | 8 |

| No. | 200 m time trial | Time | Points | Total ranking | Points |
|---|---|---|---|---|---|
| 1 | (Netherlands) Theo Bos | 10.676 | 6 | (Netherlands) Theo Bos | 36 |
| 2 | (Italy) Roberto Chiappa | 10.845 | 5 | (Netherlands) Teun Mulder | 33 |
| 3 | (Netherlands) Tim Veldt | 10.885 | 4 | (Italy) Roberto Chiappa | 28 |
| 4 | (Netherlands) Teun Mulder | 10.926 | 3 | (Netherlands) Tim Veldt | 27 |
| 5 | (Scotland) Craig MacLean | 10.927 | 2 | (Scotland) Craig MacLean | 20 |
| 6 | (Germany) Jan van Eijden | 11.407 | 1 | (Germany) Jan van Eijden | 9 |

| No. | sprint | Points | Total ranking | Points |
|---|---|---|---|---|
| 1 | (Italy) Roberto Chiappa | 10 | (Netherlands) Theo Bos | 43 |
| 2 | (Netherlands) Theo Bos | 7 | (Italy) Roberto Chiappa | 38 |
| 3 | (Netherlands) Tim Veldt | 5 | (Netherlands) Teun Mulder | 36 |
| 4 | (Netherlands) Teun Mulder | 3 | (Netherlands) Tim Veldt | 32 |
| 5 | (Scotland) Craig MacLean | 2 | (Scotland) Craig MacLean | 22 |
| 6 | (Germany) Jan van Eijden | 1 | (Germany) Jan van Eijden | 10 |

| No. | team sprint | | Points | Total ranking | Points |
|---|---|---|---|---|---|
| 1 | (Netherlands) Theo Bos | 33.740 | 6 | (Netherlands) Theo Bos | 49 |
| 1 | (Netherlands) Tim Veldt | 33.740 | 6 | (Netherlands) Teun Mulder | 42 |
| 1 | (Netherlands) Teun Mulder | 33.740 | 6 | (Italy) Roberto Chiappa | 41 |
| 2 | (Italy) Roberto Chiappa | 34.529 | 3 | (Netherlands) Tim Veldt | 38 |
| 2 | (Germany) Jan van Eijden | 34.529 | 3 | (Scotland) Craig MacLean | 25 |
| 2 | (Scotland) Craig MacLean | 34.529 | 3 | (Germany) Jan van Eijden | 13 |

== Day 3 ==
| No. | keirin | Points | Total ranking | Points |
|---|---|---|---|---|
| 1 | (Netherlands) Teun Mulder | 10 | (Netherlands) Theo Bos | 56 |
| 2 | (Netherlands) Theo Bos | 7 | (Netherlands) Teun Mulder | 52 |
| 3 | (Netherlands) Tim Veldt | 5 | (Netherlands) Tim Veldt | 43 |
| 4 | (Scotland) Craig MacLean | 3 | (Italy) Roberto Chiappa | 42 |
| 5 | (Germany) Jan van Eijden | 2 | (Scotland) Craig MacLean | 28 |
| 6 | (Italy) Roberto Chiappa | 1 | (Germany) Jan van Eijden | 15 |

| No. | 200 m time trial | Time | Points | Total ranking | Points |
|---|---|---|---|---|---|
| 1 | (Netherlands) Theo Bos | 10.656 | 6 | (Netherlands) Theo Bos | 62 |
| 2 | (Netherlands) Tim Veldt | 10.726 | 5 | (Netherlands) Teun Mulder | 54 |
| 3 | (Scotland) Craig MacLean | 10.845 | 4 | (Netherlands) Tim Veldt | 48 |
| 4 | (Italy) Roberto Chiappa | 10.876 | 3 | (Italy) Roberto Chiappa | 46 |
| 5 | (Netherlands) Teun Mulder | 10.946 | 2 | (Scotland) Craig MacLean | 32 |
| 6 | (Germany) Jan van Eijden | 11.296 | 1 | (Germany) Jan van Eijden | 16 |

| No. | sprint | Points | Total ranking | Points |
|---|---|---|---|---|
| 1 | (Netherlands) Theo Bos | 10 | (Netherlands) Theo Bos | 72 |
| 2 | (Netherlands) Tim Veldt | 7 | (Netherlands) Teun Mulder | 56 |
| 3 | (Scotland) Craig MacLean | 5 | (Netherlands) Tim Veldt | 55 |
| 4 | (Italy) Roberto Chiappa | 3 | (Italy) Roberto Chiappa | 49 |
| 5 | (Netherlands) Teun Mulder | 2 | (Scotland) Craig MacLean | 37 |
| 6 | (Germany) Jan van Eijden | 1 | (Germany) Jan van Eijden | 17 |

| No. | team sprint | | Points | Total ranking | Points |
|---|---|---|---|---|---|
| 1 | (Netherlands) Theo Bos | 33.309 | 6 | (Netherlands) Theo Bos | 78 |
| 1 | (Netherlands) Tim Veldt | 33.309 | 6 | (Netherlands) Teun Mulder | 62 |
| 1 | (Netherlands) Teun Mulder | 33.309 | 6 | (Netherlands) Tim Veldt | 61 |
| 2 | (Italy) Roberto Chiappa | 33.579 | 3 | (Italy) Roberto Chiappa | 52 |
| 2 | (Germany) Jan van Eijden | 33.579 | 3 | (Scotland) Craig MacLean | 40 |
| 2 | (Scotland) Craig MacLean | 33.579 | 3 | (Germany) Jan van Eijden | 20 |

== Day 4 ==
| No. | keirin | Points | Total ranking | Points |
|---|---|---|---|---|
| 1 | (Netherlands) Tim Veldt | 10 | (Netherlands) Theo Bos | 83 |
| 2 | (Scotland) Craig MacLean | 7 | (Netherlands) Tim Veldt | 71 |
| 3 | (Netherlands) Theo Bos | 5 | (Netherlands) Teun Mulder | 65 |
| 4 | (Netherlands) Teun Mulder | 3 | (Italy) Roberto Chiappa | 54 |
| 5 | (Italy) Roberto Chiappa | 2 | (Scotland) Craig MacLean | 47 |
| 6 | (Germany) Jan van Eijden | 1 | (Germany) Jan van Eijden | 21 |

| No. | 200 m time trial | Time | Points | Total ranking | Points |
|---|---|---|---|---|---|
| 1 | (Netherlands) Tim Veldt | 10.785 | 6 | (Netherlands) Theo Bos | 88 |
| 2 | (Netherlands) Theo Bos | 10.826 | 5 | (Netherlands) Tim Veldt | 77 |
| 3 | (Scotland) Craig MacLean | 10.876 | 4 | (Netherlands) Teun Mulder | 69 |
| 3 | (Netherlands) Teun Mulder | 10.876 | 4 | (Italy) Roberto Chiappa | 56 |
| 5 | (Italy) Roberto Chiappa | 11.025 | 2 | (Scotland) Craig MacLean | 51 |
| 6 | (Germany) Jan van Eijden | 11.176 | 1 | (Germany) Jan van Eijden | 22 |

| No. | sprint | Points | Total ranking | Points |
|---|---|---|---|---|
| 1 | (Netherlands) Theo Bos | 10 | (Netherlands) Theo Bos | 98 |
| 2 | (Netherlands) Tim Veldt | 7 | (Netherlands) Tim Veldt | 84 |
| 3 | (Netherlands) Teun Mulder | 5 | (Netherlands) Teun Mulder | 74 |
| 4 | (Scotland) Craig MacLean | 3 | (Italy) Roberto Chiappa | 57 |
| 5 | (Germany) Jan van Eijden | 2 | (Scotland) Craig MacLean | 54 |
| 6 | (Italy) Roberto Chiappa | 1 | (Germany) Jan van Eijden | 24 |

| No. | team sprint | | Points | Total ranking | Points |
|---|---|---|---|---|---|
| 1 | (Italy) Roberto Chiappa | 33.789 | 6 | (Netherlands) Theo Bos | 101 |
| 1 | (Germany) Jan van Eijden | 33.789 | 6 | (Netherlands) Tim Veldt | 87 |
| 1 | (Scotland) Craig MacLean | 33.789 | 6 | (Netherlands) Teun Mulder | 77 |
| 2 | (Netherlands) Theo Bos | 34.980 | 2 | (Italy) Roberto Chiappa | 63 |
| 2 | (Netherlands) Tim Veldt | 34.980 | 3 | (Scotland) Craig MacLean | 60 |
| 2 | (Netherlands) Teun Mulder | 34.980 | 3 | (Germany) Jan van Eijden | 30 |

== Day 5 ==
| No. | keirin | Points | Total ranking | Points |
|---|---|---|---|---|
| 1 | (Scotland) Craig MacLean | 10 | (Netherlands) Theo Bos | 108 |
| 2 | (Netherlands) Theo Bos | 7 | (Netherlands) Tim Veldt | 89 |
| 3 | (Germany) Jan van Eijden | 5 | (Netherlands) Teun Mulder | 78 |
| 4 | (Italy) Roberto Chiappa | 3 | (Scotland) Craig MacLean | 70 |
| 5 | (Netherlands) Tim Veldt | 2 | (Italy) Roberto Chiappa | 66 |
| 6 | (Netherlands) Teun Mulder | 1 | (Germany) Jan van Eijden | 35 |

| No. | 200 m time trial | Time | Points | Total ranking | Points |
|---|---|---|---|---|---|
| 1 | (Netherlands) Theo Bos | 10.756 | 6 | (Netherlands) Theo Bos | 114 |
| 2 | (Netherlands) Tim Veldt | 10.826 | 5 | (Netherlands) Tim Veldt | 94 |
| 3 | (Scotland) Craig MacLean | 10.895 | 4 | (Netherlands) Teun Mulder | 81 |
| 4 | (Netherlands) Teun Mulder | 10.935 | 3 | (Scotland) Craig MacLean | 74 |
| 5 | (Italy) Roberto Chiappa | 10.976 | 2 | (Italy) Roberto Chiappa | 68 |
| 6 | (Germany) Jan van Eijden | 11.086 | 1 | (Germany) Jan van Eijden | 36 |

| No. | sprint | Points | Total ranking | Points |
|---|---|---|---|---|
| 1 | (Netherlands) Theo Bos | 10 | (Netherlands) Theo Bos | 124 |
| 2 | (Netherlands) Tim Veldt | 7 | (Netherlands) Tim Veldt | 101 |
| 3 | (Netherlands) Teun Mulder | 5 | (Netherlands) Teun Mulder | 86 |
| 4 | (Scotland) Craig MacLean | 3 | (Scotland) Craig MacLean | 77 |
| 5 | (Italy) Roberto Chiappa | 2 | (Italy) Roberto Chiappa | 70 |
| 6 | (Germany) Jan van Eijden | 1 | (Germany) Jan van Eijden | 37 |

| No. | team sprint | | Points | Total ranking | Points |
|---|---|---|---|---|---|
| 1 | (Italy) Roberto Chiappa | 33.137 | 6 | (Netherlands) Theo Bos | 127 |
| 1 | (Germany) Jan van Eijden | 33.137 | 6 | (Netherlands) Tim Veldt | 104 |
| 1 | (Scotland) Craig MacLean | 33.137 | 6 | (Netherlands) Teun Mulder | 89 |
| 2 | (Netherlands) Theo Bos | 33.639 | 2 | (Scotland) Craig MacLean | 83 |
| 2 | (Netherlands) Tim Veldt | 33.639 | 3 | (Italy) Roberto Chiappa | 76 |
| 2 | (Netherlands) Teun Mulder | 33.639 | 3 | (Germany) Jan van Eijden | 43 |

== Day 6 ==
| No. | team sprint | | Points | Total ranking | Points |
|---|---|---|---|---|---|
| 1 | (Netherlands) Theo Bos | 32.947 | 6 | (Netherlands) Theo Bos | 133 |
| 1 | (Netherlands) Tim Veldt | 32.947 | 6 | (Netherlands) Tim Veldt | 110 |
| 1 | (Netherlands) Teun Mulder | 32.947 | 6 | (Netherlands) Teun Mulder | 95 |
| 2 | (Italy) Roberto Chiappa | 33.228 | 3 | (Scotland) Craig MacLean | 86 |
| 2 | (Germany) Jan van Eijden | 33.228 | 3 | (Italy) Roberto Chiappa | 79 |
| 2 | (Scotland) Craig MacLean | 33.228 | 3 | (Germany) Jan van Eijden | 46 |

| No. | 200 m time trial | Time | Points | Total ranking | Points |
|---|---|---|---|---|---|
| 1 | (Netherlands) Tim Veldt | 10.866 | 6 | (Netherlands) Theo Bos | 138 |
| 2 | (Netherlands) Theo Bos | 10.876 | 5 | (Netherlands) Tim Veldt | 116 |
| 3 | (Italy) Roberto Chiappa | 10.886 | 4 | (Netherlands) Teun Mulder | 98 |
| 4 | (Netherlands) Teun Mulder | 10.916 | 3 | (Scotland) Craig MacLean | 88 |
| 5 | (Scotland) Craig MacLean | 10.936 | 2 | (Italy) Roberto Chiappa | 83 |
| 6 | (Germany) Jan van Eijden | 11.337 | 1 | (Germany) Jan van Eijden | 47 |

| No. | sprint | Points | Total ranking | Points |
|---|---|---|---|---|
| 1 | (Netherlands) Theo Bos | 10 | (Netherlands) Theo Bos | 148 |
| 2 | (Netherlands) Tim Veldt | 7 | (Netherlands) Tim Veldt | 123 |
| 3 | (Netherlands) Teun Mulder | 5 | (Netherlands) Teun Mulder | 103 |
| 4 | (Italy) Roberto Chiappa | 3 | (Scotland) Craig MacLean | 90 |
| 5 | (Scotland) Craig MacLean | 2 | (Italy) Roberto Chiappa | 86 |
| 6 | (Germany) Jan van Eijden | 1 | (Germany) Jan van Eijden | 48 |

| No. | keirin | Points | Total ranking | Points |
|---|---|---|---|---|
| 1 | (Netherlands) Theo Bos | 10 | (Netherlands) Theo Bos | 158 |
| 2 | (Netherlands) Teun Mulder | 7 | (Netherlands) Tim Veldt | 126 |
| 3 | (Scotland) Craig MacLean | 5 | (Netherlands) Teun Mulder | 110 |
| 4 | (Netherlands) Tim Veldt | 3 | (Scotland) Craig MacLean | 95 |
| 5 | (Italy) Roberto Chiappa | 2 | (Italy) Roberto Chiappa | 88 |
| 6 | (Germany) Jan van Eijden | 1 | (Germany) Jan van Eijden | 49 |

== Discipline rankings ==
| No. | keirin | Points | sprint | Points | 200 m time trial | Points |
|---|---|---|---|---|---|---|
| 1 | (Netherlands) Theo Bos | 37 | (Netherlands) Theo Bos | 57 | (Netherlands) Theo Bos | 34 |
| 2 | (Scotland) Craig MacLean | 36 | (Netherlands) Tim Veldt | 36 | (Netherlands) Tim Veldt | 30 |
| 3 | (Netherlands) Teun Mulder | 33 | (Netherlands) Teun Mulder | 27 | (Netherlands) Teun Mulder | 20 |
| 4 | (Netherlands) Tim Veldt | 30 | (Italy) Roberto Chiappa | 25 | (Italy) Roberto Chiappa | 19 |
| 5 | (Italy) Roberto Chiappa | 20 | (Scotland) Craig MacLean | 16 | (Scotland) Craig MacLean | 18 |
| 6 | (Germany) Jan van Eijden | 12 | (Germany) Jan van Eijden | 7 | (Germany) Jan van Eijden | 6 |
