= Ondřej Rybín =

Czech track cyclist

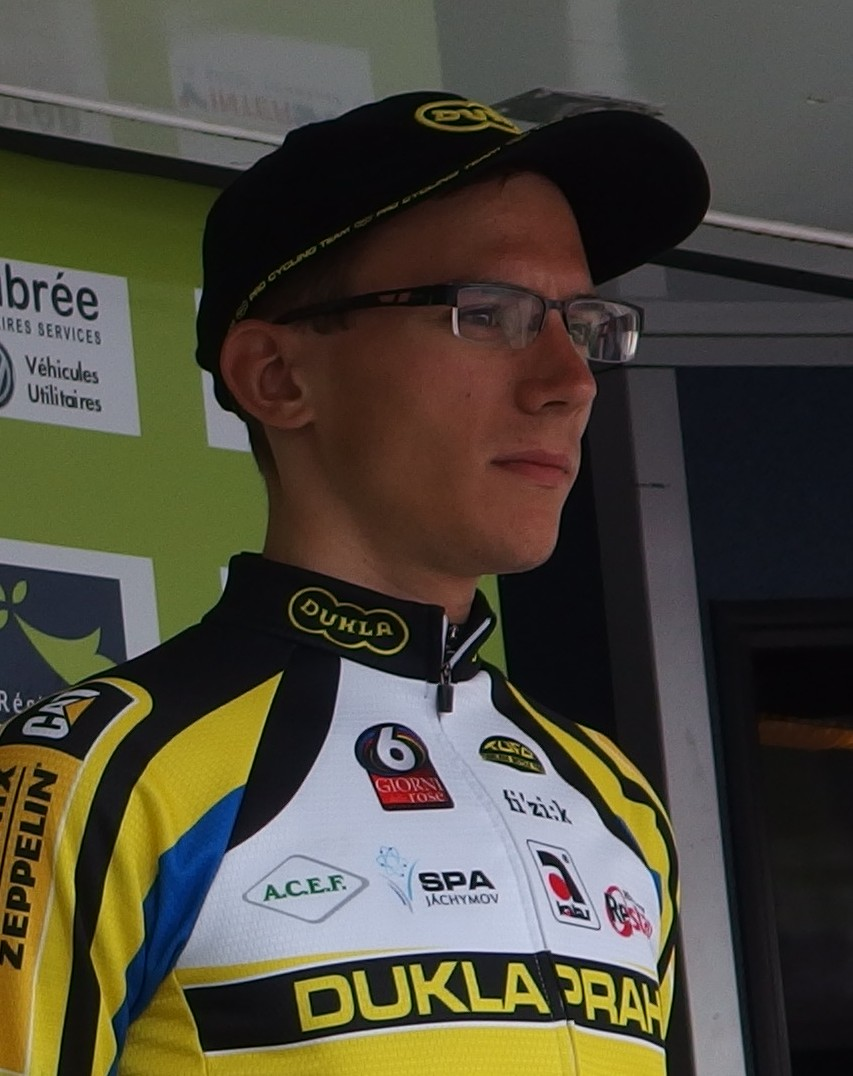

Personal information
- Born: 12 May 1993 (age 33)

Cycling career
- Sport: Cycling
- Discipline: Track cycling
- Role: Rider
- Rider type: omnium

Ondřej Rybín (born 12 May 1993) is a Czech male track cyclist. He competed in the omnium event at the 2013 and 2014 UCI Track Cycling World Championships.

On 18 September 2015, the Czech Cycling Federation announced that Rybin had been handed a 4-year ban from sports after he'd tested positive for EPO in an out-of-competition control in June. Rybin had won bronze in the scratch race at the 2015 European Track Championships (under-23 & junior) in July, a race he was set to be disqualified from after the positive from June was revealed.
