= Ondřej Vendolský =

Czech track cyclist

Ondrej Vendolsky
Personal information
- Born: 12 July 1991 (age 35)

Cycling career
- Sport: Cycling
- Discipline: Track cycling
- Role: Rider
- Rider type: endurance

Ondrej Vendolsky (born 12 July 1991) is a Czech male track cyclist. He competed in the individual and team pursuit event at the 2013 UCI Track Cycling World Championships.

He competed for the team ASC DUKLA PRAHA from year 2011 to 2013.
