= Oleksandr Lobov =

Ukrainian cyclist

Personal information
- Born: 16 December 1990 (age 35)

Cycling career
- Sport: Cycling
- Discipline: Track cycling
- Role: Rider
- Rider type: team pursuit

Oleksandr Lobov (born 16 December 1990) is a Ukrainian male track cyclist. He competed in the team pursuit event at the 2012 and 2013 UCI Track Cycling World Championships.
