= Marathon–Tula =

Russian cycling team

Team information
- UCI code: MCT
- Registered: Tula, Russia
- Founded: 2017
- Disciplines: Road; Track
- Status: UCI Track team (2018–)

Key personnel
- General manager: Aleksandr Egorov

Team name history
- 2017–: Marathon-Tula

Marathon–Tula is a Russian UCI track team founded in 2017. After the 2022 Russian invasion of Ukraine, the UCI said that Russian teams are forbidden from competing in international events.

== History ==
The project was created through the initiative of Alexey Dyumin, governor of the Tula region, and Alexander Vinokurov, president of the investment company Marathon Group, with the aim of supporting and developing Russian cycling. The team's second sponsor since 2018 is VSMPO-AVISMA.

The team's cyclists come from the Tula region as well as other regions of Russia. The team specializes in track disciplines, however its cyclists participate in road races as well

Marathon–Tula became a UCI track team in 2018. Marathon–Tula's cyclists have participated in the events of the UCI Track Cycling World Cup multiple times after having joined the team.

After the 2022 Russian invasion of Ukraine, the UCI said that Russian and Belarusian teams are forbidden from competing in international events.

== Team roster ==
=== Season 2020 ===
| Rider | Date of birth |
|---|---|
| Alexander Dubchenko | 19 February 1995 |
| Artur Ershov | 7 March 1990 |
| Diana Klimova | 8 October 1996 |
| Daniil Komkov | 11 September 2000 |
| Dmitry Nesterov | 11 February 1999 |
| Alexey Nosov | 27 April 1997 |
| Maxim Piskunov | 10 October 1997 |
| Pavel Rostov | 12 January 1999 |
| Tamara Dronova | 13 August 1993 |
| Serafima Grishina | 6 March 1999 |
| Andrei Sazanov | 25 January 1994 |
| Evgeny Serdyukov | 5 March 2001 |
| Mikhail Vyunoshev | 24 November 2001 |

=== Season 2019 ===
| Rider | Date of birth |
|---|---|
| Maria Averina | 4 October 1993 |
| Alexander Dubchenko | 19 February 1995 |
| Artur Ershov | 7 March 1990 |
| Nikolay Zhurkin | 5 May 1991 |
| Vladimir Ilchenko | 30 April 1996 |
| Diana Klimova | 8 October 1996 |
| Evgeny Kovalev | 6 March 1989 |
| Daniil Komkov | 11 September 2000 |
| Dmitry Nesterov | 11 February 1999 |
| Alexey Nosov | 27 April 1997 |
| Maxim Piskunov | 10 October 1997 |
| Pavel Rostov | 12 January 1999 |
| Maksim Sukhov | 18 March 1997 |

== Major results ==
=== 2017 ===
UEC European Track Championships, Berlin

— 2nd — elimination race — Maxim Piskunov

=== 2018 ===
UEC European Track Championships, Glasgow

— 2nd — madison — Diana Klimova (with Gulnaz Badykova)

2017–18 UCI Track Cycling World Cup, Pruszków

— 1st — scratch race — Maria Averina

=== 2019 ===
European games, Minsk

— 3rd – madison – Diana Klimova (with Maria Novolodskaya)

=== 2020 ===
2019–20 UCI Track Cycling World Cup, Glasgow

— 3rd – scratch race – Diana Klimova

Russian National Road Race Championships

— 1st – mass start – Diana Klimova

— 3rd – time trial – Tamara Dronova
