= Artur Ershov =

Russian cyclist

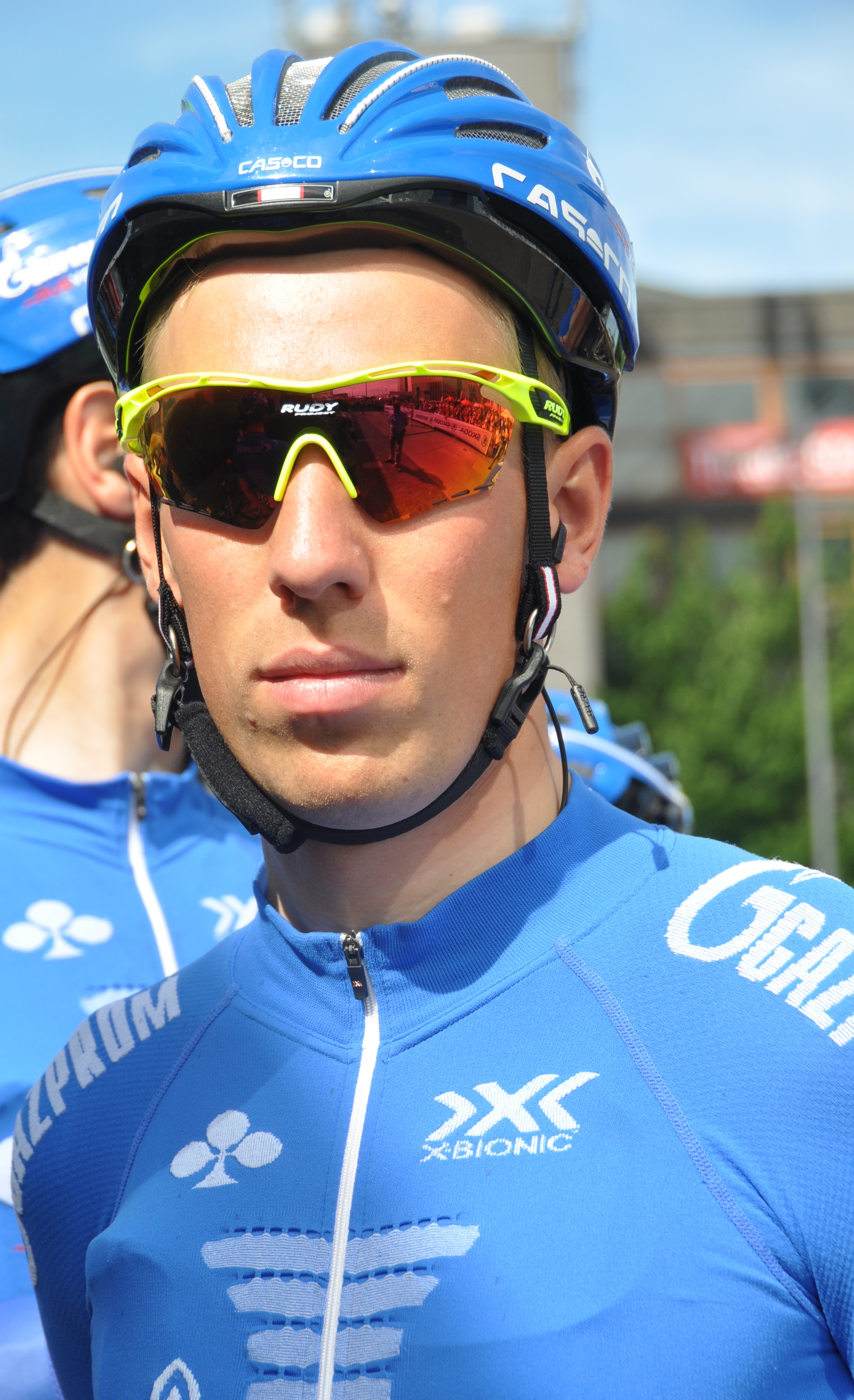
- Ershov in 2017

Personal information
- Full name: Artur Stanislavovich Ershov
- Born: 7 March 1990 (age 36) Moscow, Russian SFSR, Soviet Union (now Russia)

Cycling career
- Sport: Cycling
- Current team: Marathon–Tula
- Disciplines: Road; Track
- Role: Rider
- Rider type: Rouleur (road); Endurance (track)

Amateur teams
- 2018: Marathon–Tula
- 2019: Fiberli Antalyaspor
- 2021: Ural

Professional teams
- 2009: Lokomotiv
- 2012–2017: RusVelo
- 2019–: Marathon–Tula
Medal record
Men's track cycling
Representing Russia
UCI World Championships
Gold medal – first place	2015 Yvelines	Points race
UEC European Championships
Gold medal – first place	2012 Panevėžys	Team pursuit
Silver medal – second place	2012 Panevėžys	Omnium
Silver medal – second place	2012 Panevėžys	Madison
Silver medal – second place	2013 Apeldoorn	Team pursuit
Bronze medal – third place	2014 Baie-Mahault	Team pursuit

Artur Stanislavovich Ershov (Russian: Артур Станиславович Ершов; born 7 March 1990) is a Russian professional racing cyclist, who currently rides for UCI Track Team Marathon–Tula. He rode at the 2015 UCI Track Cycling World Championships. He was named in the start list for the 2016 Giro d'Italia.

== Major results ==
2008
6th Road race, UCI Juniors World Championships
6th Time trial, UEC European Junior Road Championships
2011
2nd Time trial, National Under-23 Road Championships
2012
1st Team pursuit, UEC European Track Championships
9th Memorial Oleg Dyachenko
10th Overall Tour of Qinghai Lake

1st Stage 8

2013
10th Trofeo Palma
2014
1st Overall Grand Prix Udmurtskaya Pravda

1st Stage 4

3rd Road race, National Road Championships
2015
1st Points race, UCI Track World Championships
4th Overall Tour of Kuban
2016
1st Stage 1b (TTT) Settimana Internazionale di Coppi e Bartali
2018
1st Stage 3 Vuelta Ciclista a Costa Rica
3rd Overall Five Rings of Moscow
2020
1st Overall Tour of Mevlana
8th Grand Prix Velo Erciyes
8th Grand Prix Central Anatolia

=== Grand Tour general classification results timeline ===
Grand Tour	2016
Giro d'Italia	DNF
Tour de France	—
Vuelta a España	—

Legend
—	Did not compete
DNF	Did not finish
