= Fintan Ryan (cyclist) =

Irish cyclist

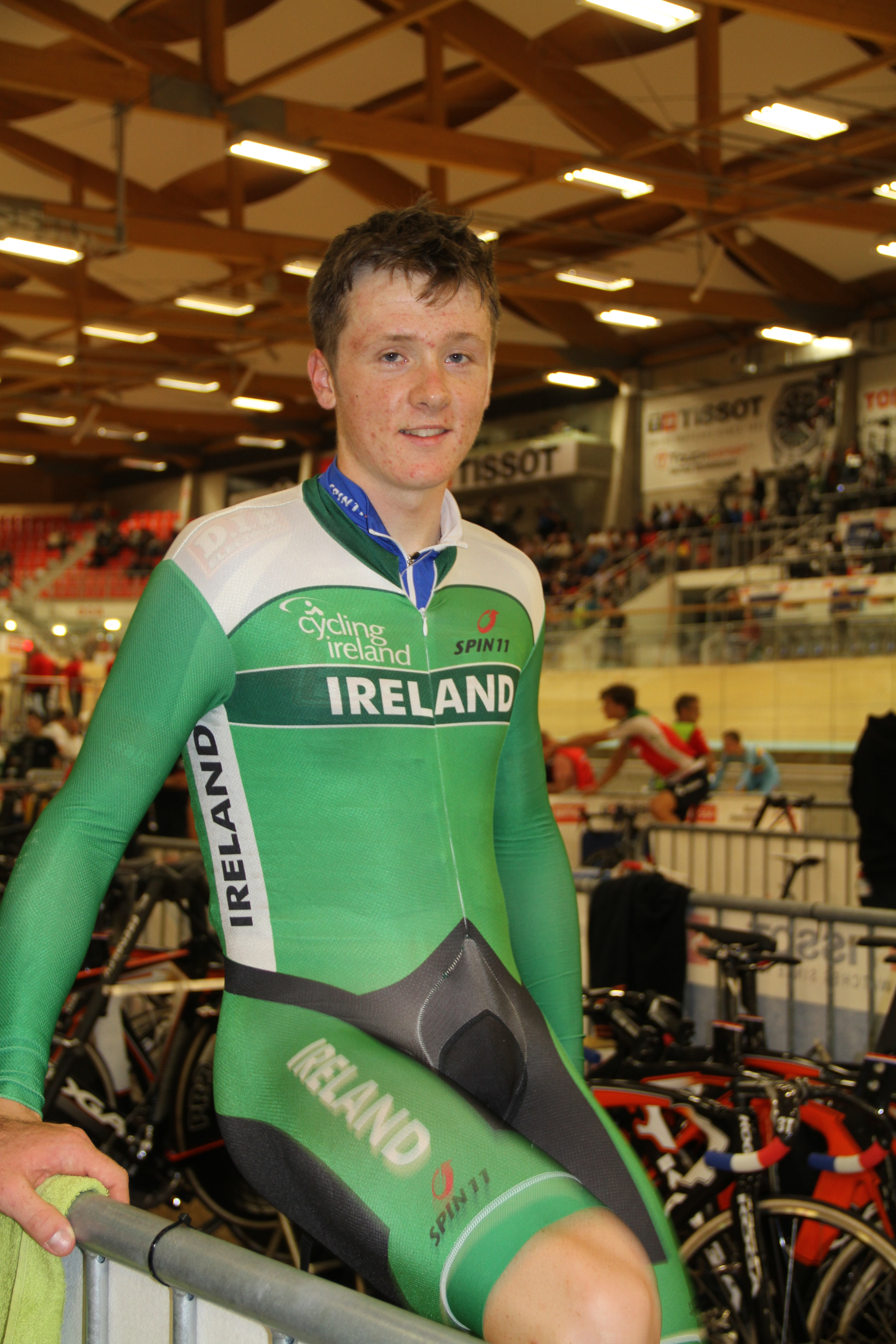
- Ryan in 2015

Personal information
- Born: 24 September 1996 (age 30) Wicklow
- Height: 182 cm (6 ft 0 in)
- Weight: 70 kg (154 lb)

Cycling career
- Sport: Cycling
- Current team: EvoPro Racing
- Disciplines: Track; Road
- Role: Rider
- Rider type: Track

Amateur teams
- 2013–2014: Nicolas Roche Performance Team
- 2017: Team Planet X Carnac
- 2018: Cycling Leinster
- 2019–2020: Kingspan Track Team

Professional team
- 2021–: EvoPro Racing

Fintan Ryan (born 24 September 1996) is an Irish track and road cyclist, who currently rides for UCI Continental team EvoPro Racing. Representing Ireland at international competitions, Ryan competed at the 2015 UEC European Track Championships in the team pursuit event and at the 2016 UEC European Track Championships in the elimination race event. He was also 2013 national junior road race champion of Ireland, and raced for Nicolas Roche's development team.
