= Taras Shevchuk =

Ukrainian cyclist

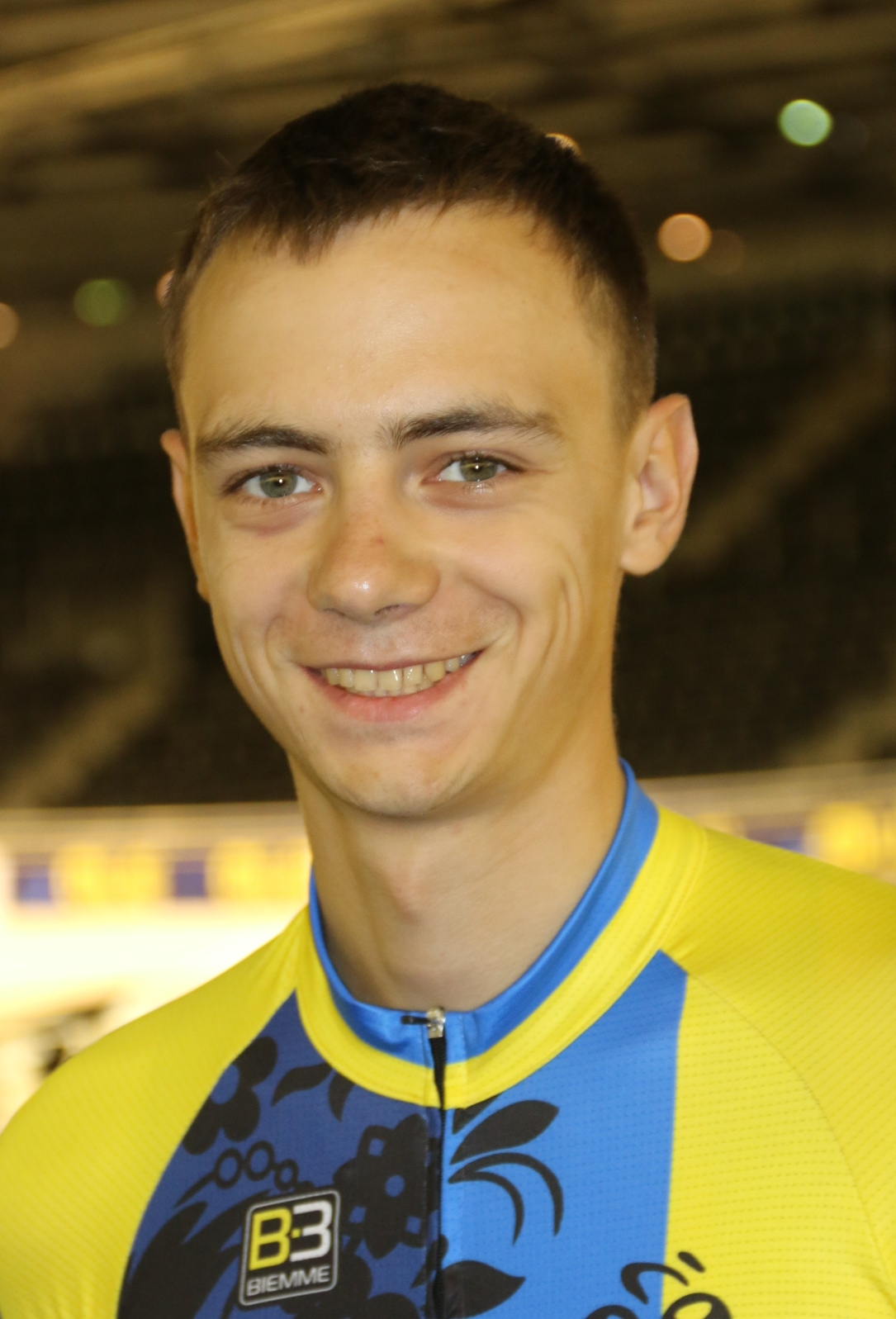
- Taras Shevchuk (2017)

Personal information
- Born: 4 January 1997 (age 29)

Cycling career
- Sport: Cycling
- Discipline: Track cycling
Medal record
Men's track cycling
Representing Ukraine

Taras Shevchuk (born 4 January 1997) is a Ukrainian male track cyclist, representing Ukraine at international competitions. He competed at the 2016 UCI Track Cycling World Championships in the men's team pursuit and at the 2016 UEC European Track Championships in the scratch event.
