= Nicky Cocquyt =

Belgian cyclist

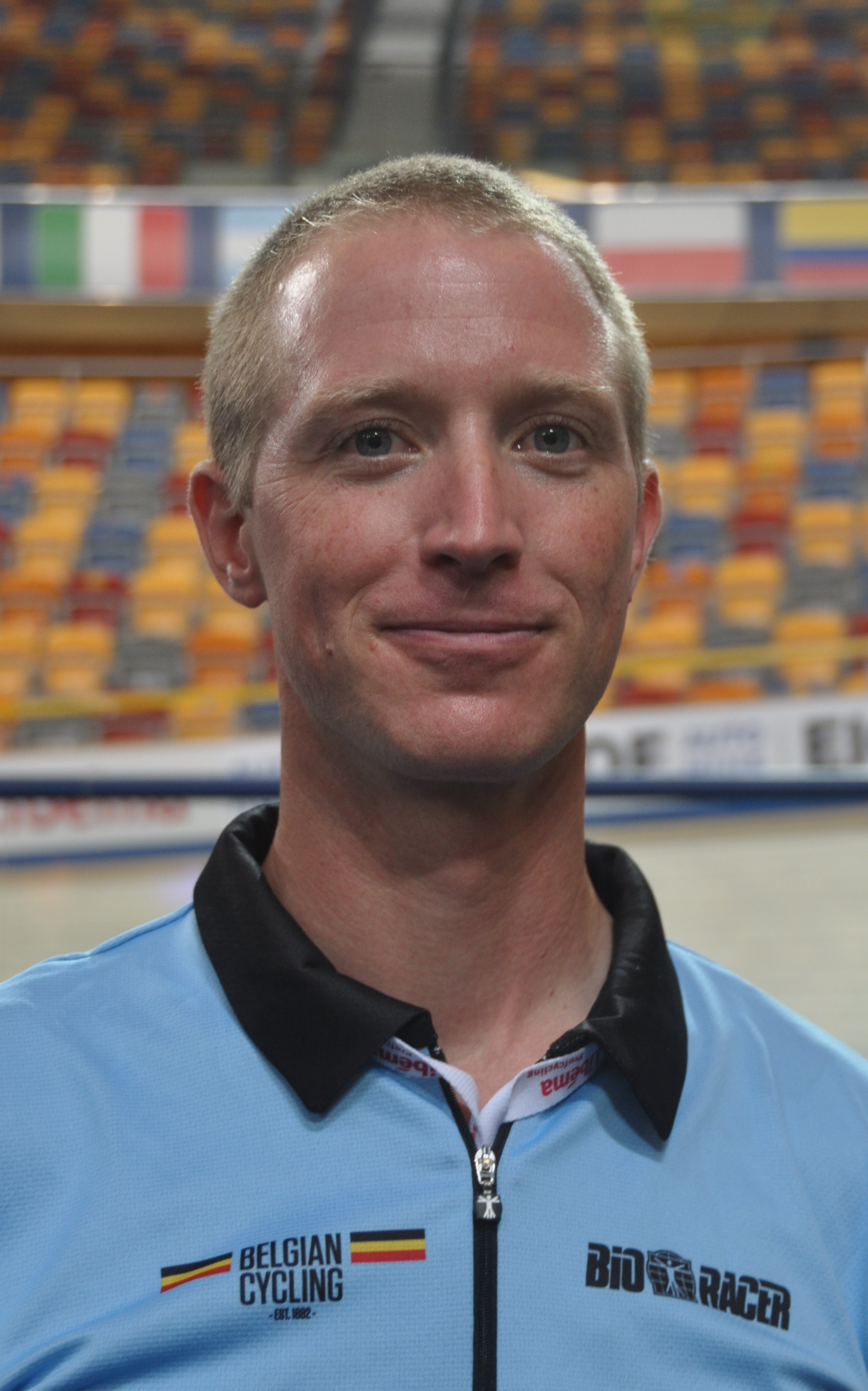
- Nicky Cocquyt (2021)

Personal information
- Born: 14 October 1984 (age 42)

Cycling career
- Sport: Cycling
- Discipline: Track cycling
- Role: Rider
- Rider type: scratch

Nicky Cocquyt (born 14 October 1984) is a Belgian male track cyclist, riding for the national team. He competed in the scratch event at the 2011 UCI Track Cycling World Championships.
