= Mher Mkrtchyan (cyclist) =

Armenian cyclist

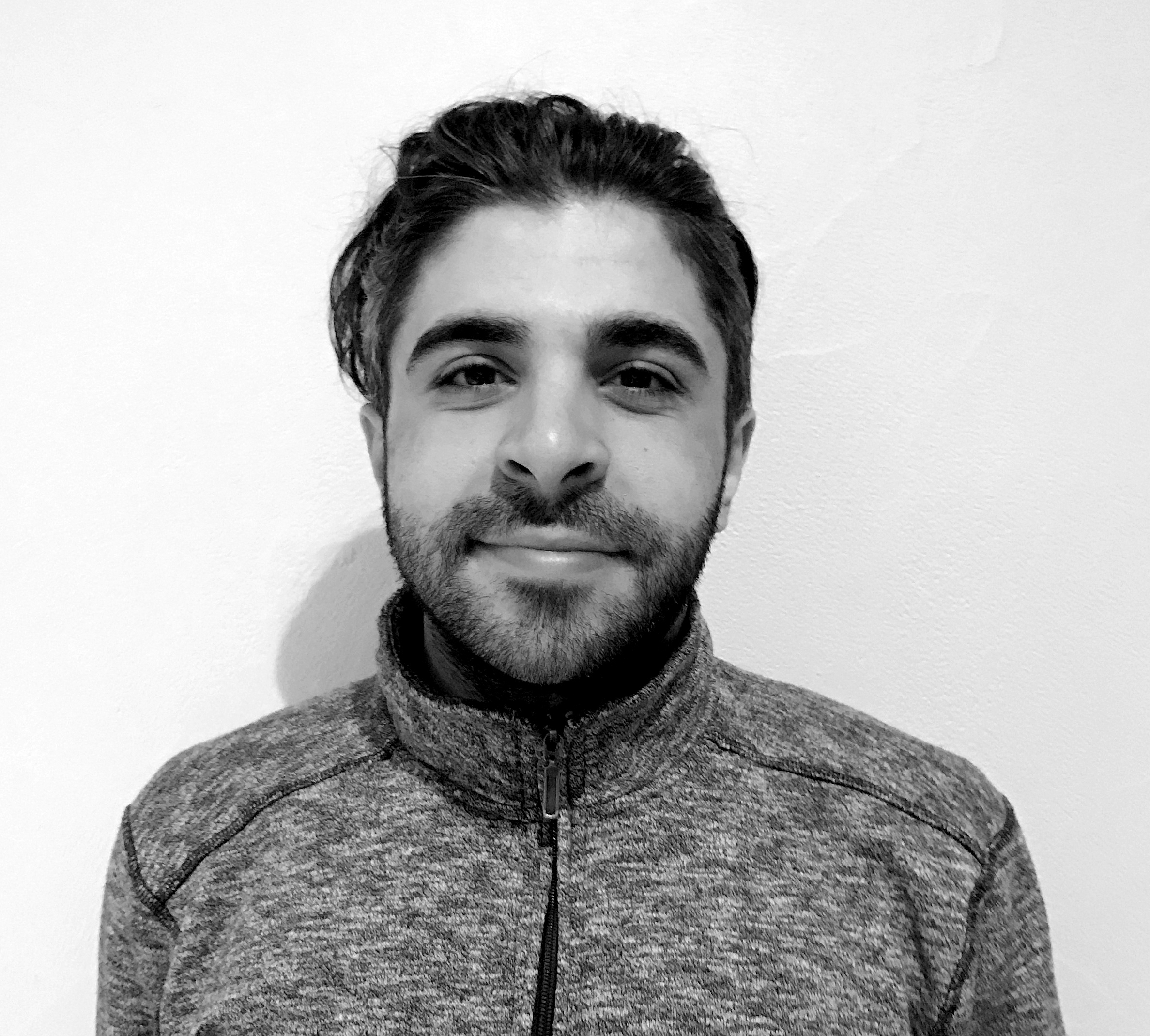
- Mher Mkrtchyan (January 2017)

Personal information
- Born: 13 August 1993 (age 33)

Cycling career
- Sport: Cycling
- Discipline: Track cycling

Amateur team
- 2016–2017: Charvieu-Chavagneux IC
Medal record
Men's track cycling
Representing Armenia

Mher Mkrtchyan (born 13 August 1993) is an Armenian track cyclist, representing Armenia at international competitions. He competed at the 2016 UEC European Track Championships in the scratch event.
