= Mika Simola =

Finnish cyclist

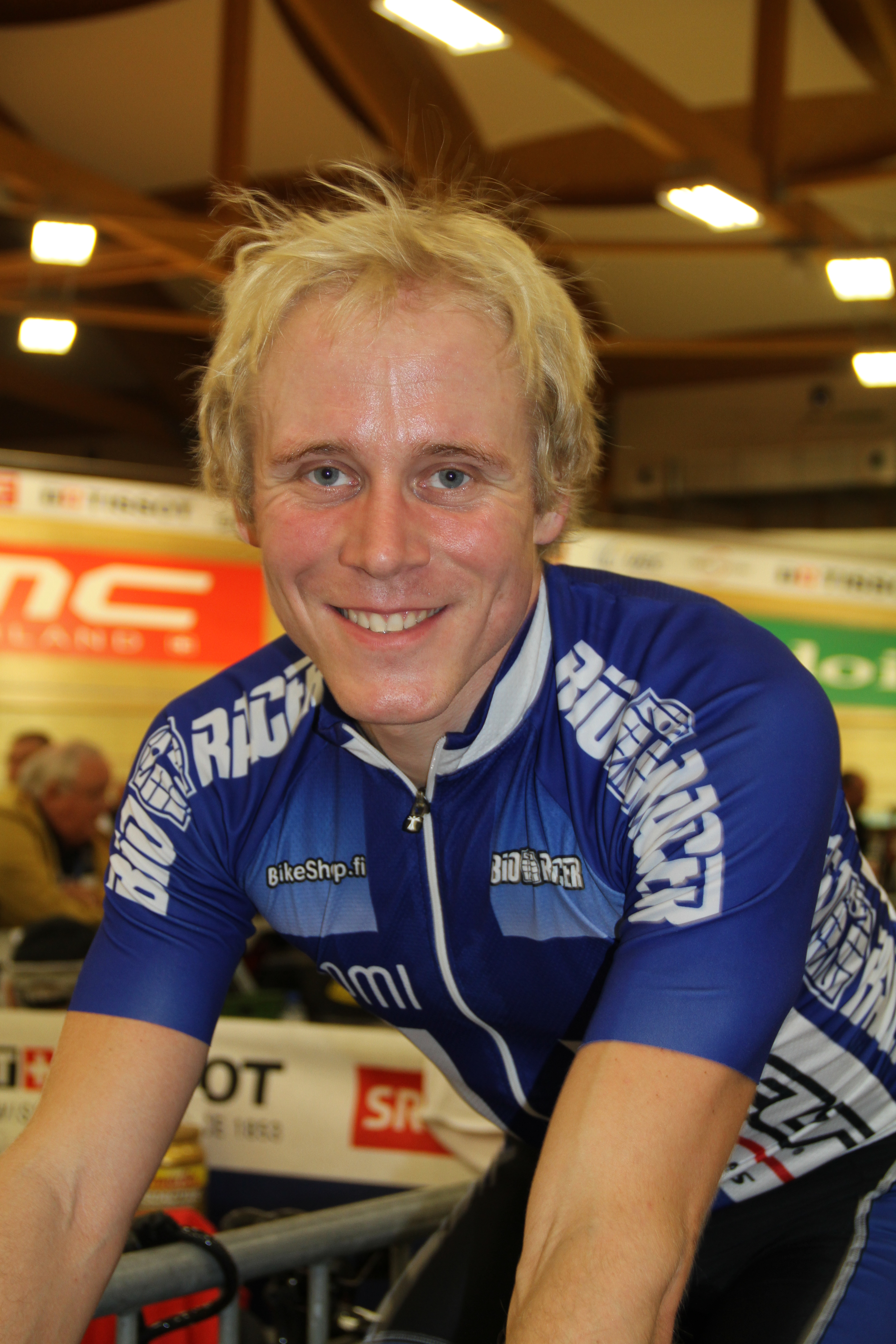
- Simola at the 2015 UEC European Track Championships

Personal information
- Full name: Mika Simola
- Born: 24 August 1985 (age 41)

Cycling career
- Sport: Cycling
- Disciplines: Road, track
- Role: Rider

Mika Simola (born 24 August 1985) is a Finnish racing cyclist. He finished in third place in the Finnish National Road Race Championships in 2012 and 2013. He rode in the 2016 and 2017 UCI Track Cycling World Championships
