= Lucas Liss =

German cyclist (born 1992)

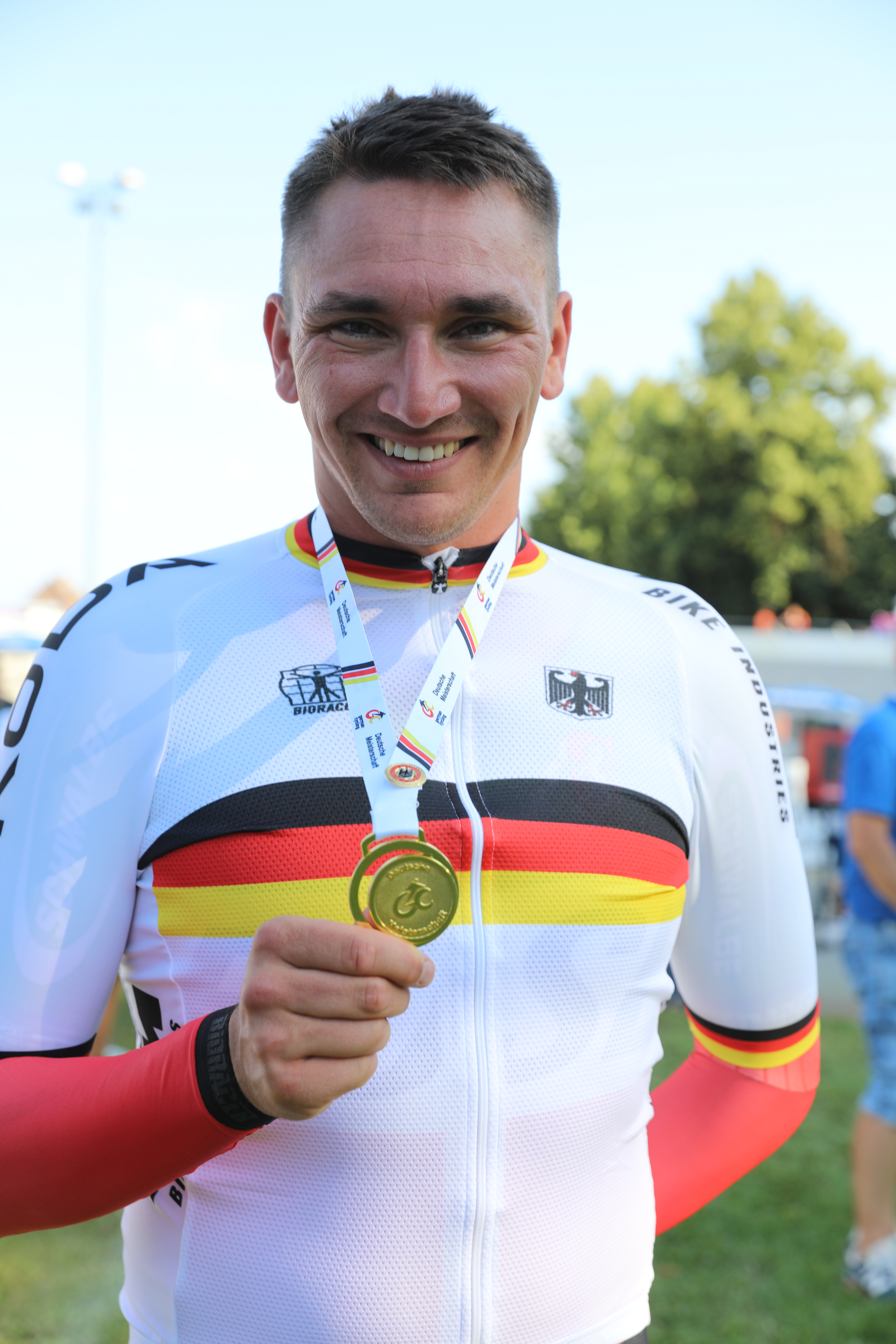
- Liss in 2025

Personal information
- Full name: Lucas Liss
- Born: 12 January 1992 (age 34) Unna, Germany

Cycling career
- Sport: Cycling
- Current team: Rad-Net Oßwald
- Disciplines: Road; Track
- Role: Rider (retired); Directeur sportif

Amateur teams
- 2005–2012: RSV Unna 1968
- 2009–2012: Red Bull Team NRW
- 2020: RSV Unna 1968

Professional teams
- 2013: Rad-Net Rose Team
- 2014: Team Stölting
- 2015–2018: Rad-Net Rose Team
- 2019: Team Sauerland NRW p/b SKS Germany

Managerial team
- 2021–: Rad-Net Rose Team

Major wins
- Track Scratch, World Championships (2015)
Medal record
Representing Germany
Men's track cycling
World Championships
Gold medal – first place	2015 Yvelines	Scratch
Silver medal – second place	2017 Hong Kong	Scratch
European Championships
Gold medal – first place	2012 Panevėžys	Omnium
Silver medal – second place	2012 Panevėžys	Team pursuit

Lucas Liss (born 12 January 1992) is a German former cyclist, who currently works as a directeur sportif for UCI Continental team Rad-Net Oßwald. He won a gold medal at the scratch event at the 2015 UCI Track Cycling World Championships and gold and a silver medal at the 2012 European Track Championships.

His father Lucjan Lis was a silver medal winning Polish Olympic cyclist and later Lucas' coach and manager.

== Major results ==
=== Road ===
2010
1st Stage 3 Niedersachsen-Rundfahrt
2016
1st Prologue Tour de Normandie

=== Track ===
2012
UEC European Championships

1st Omnium
2nd Team pursuit

2015
1st Scratch, UCI World Championships
2017
2nd Scratch, UCI World Championships
