= Vladyslav Kreminskyi =

Ukrainian cyclist (born 1995)

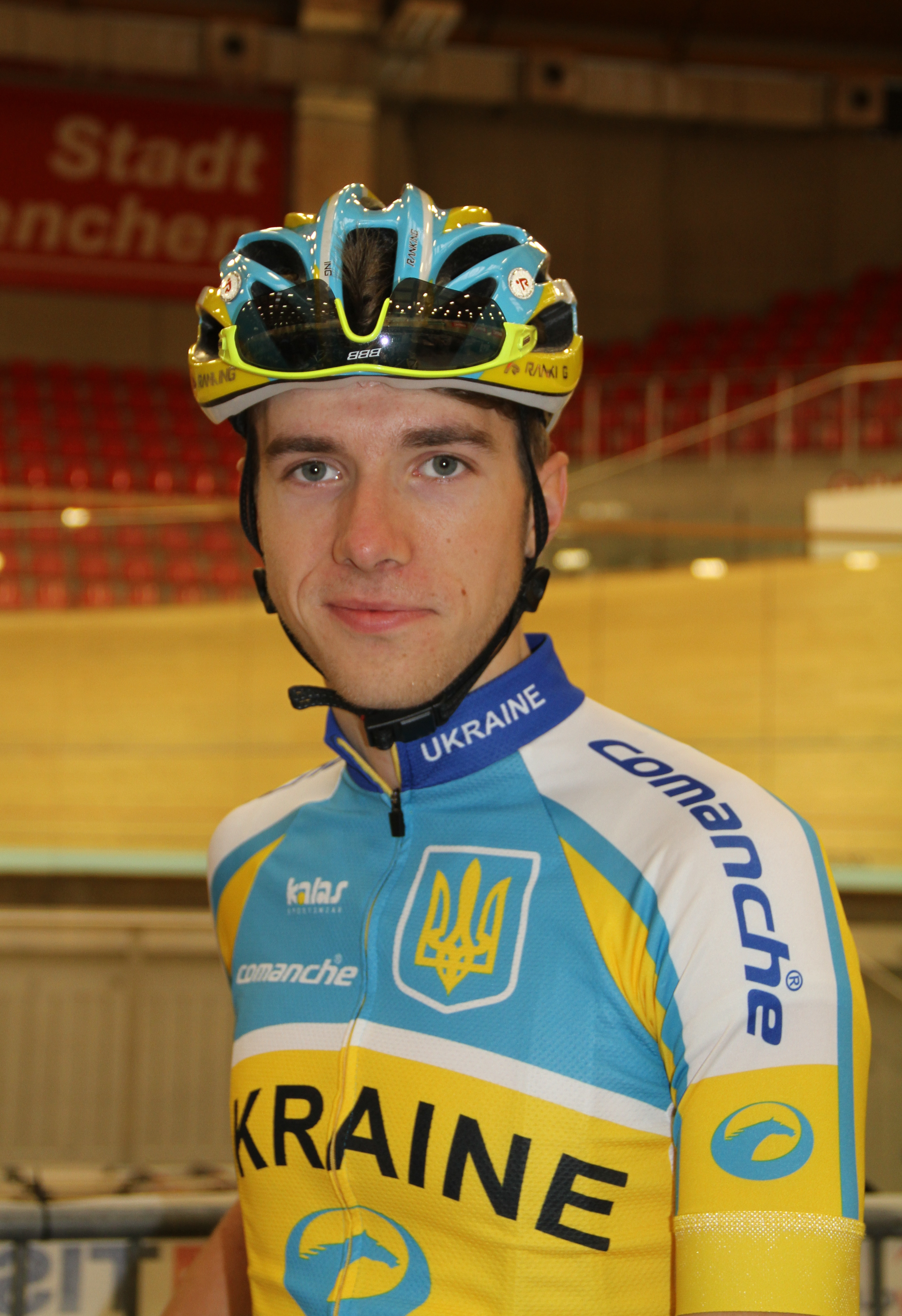

Personal information
- Born: 2 March 1995 (age 31)

Cycling career
- Sport: Cycling
- Current team: ISD–Jorbi
- Discipline: Track
- Role: Rider
- Rider type: madison team pursuit

Professional team
- 2016–: ISD–Jorbi

Vladyslav Kreminskyi (born 2 March 1995) is a Ukrainian track cyclist. He competed in the madison event at the 2015 UCI Track Cycling World Championships.
