= Olivier Beer =

Swiss cyclist

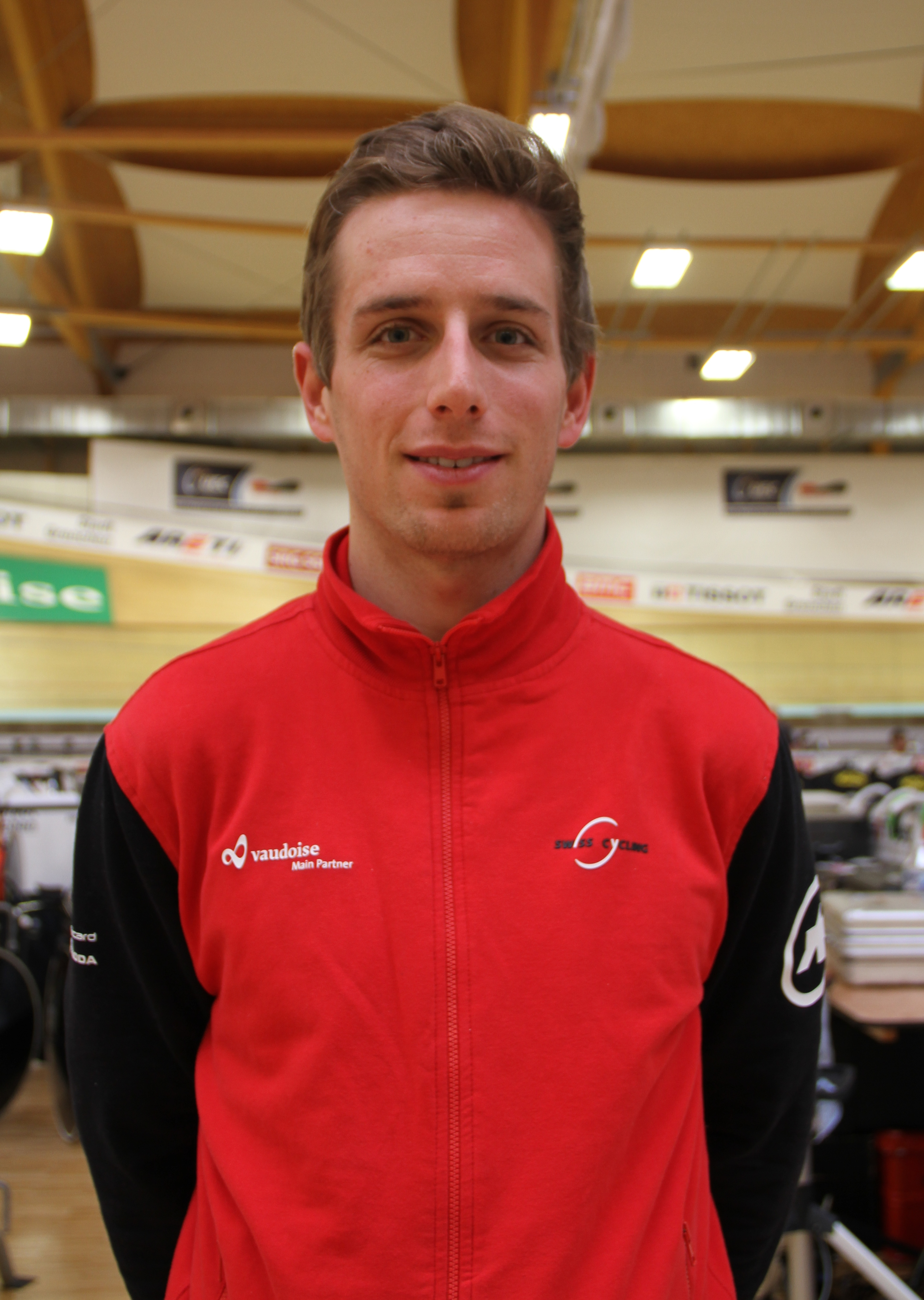
- Olivier Beer (2015)

Personal information
- Born: 18 October 1990 (age 35) Lausanne, Switzerland

Cycling career
- Sport: Cycling
- Role: Rider

Olivier Beer (born 18 October 1990) is a Swiss professional racing cyclist. He rode at the 2015 UCI Track Cycling World Championships.
