= Francesco Castegnaro =

Italian cyclist (born 1994)

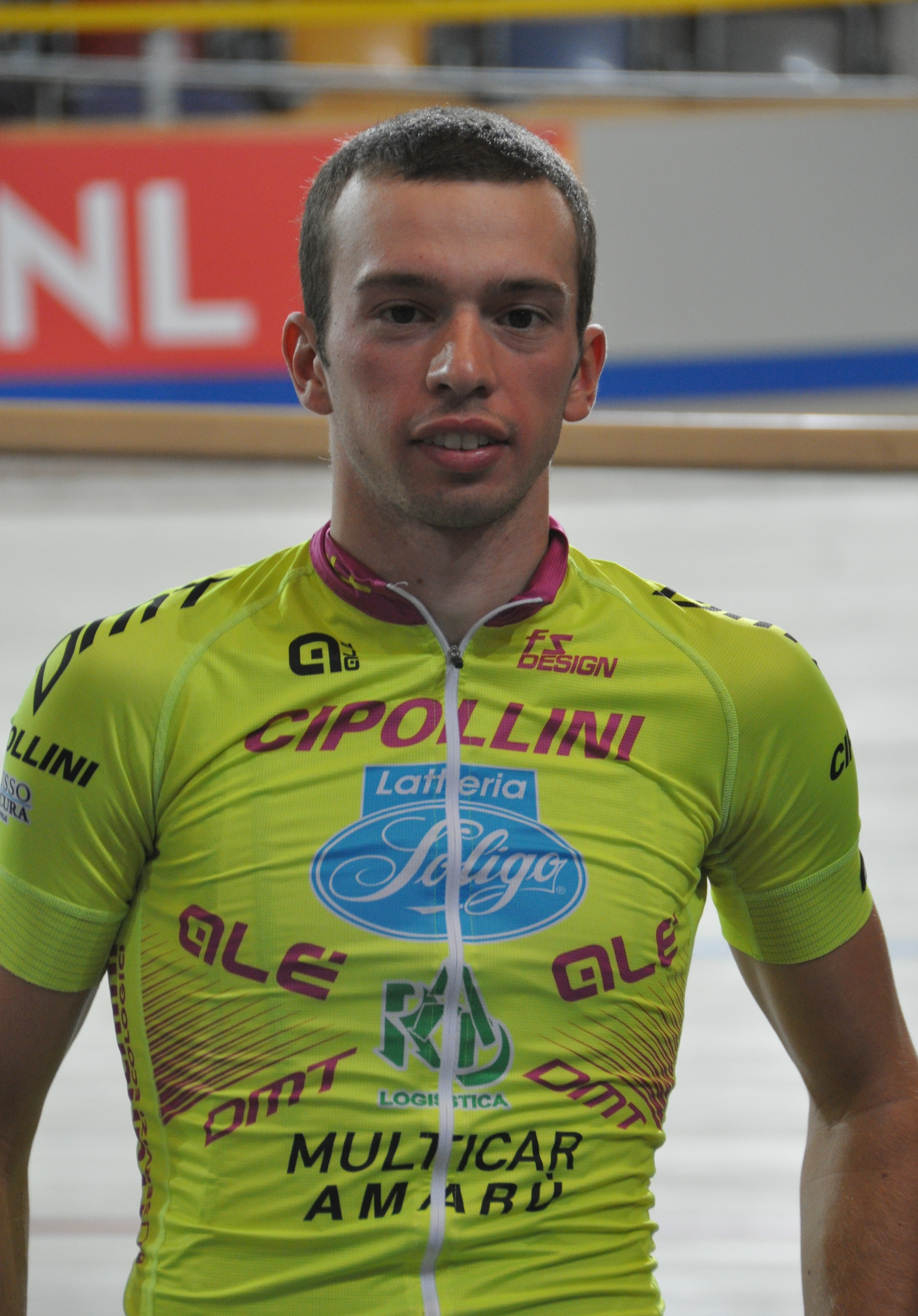
- Castegnaro in 2016

Personal information
- Full name: Francesco Castegnaro
- Born: 28 April 1994 (age 32) Soave, Veneto, Italy

Cycling career
- Sport: Cycling
- Current team: Retired
- Disciplines: Track; Road
- Role: Rider

Amateur teams
- 2009–2010: La Rizza Thermo King
- 2011: Contri Autozai Tagliaro
- 2012: GS San Pietro in Gù
- 2013–2015: Palazzago–Fenice–Elledent
- 2016–2017: Soligo Amarú Palazzago Sirio
- 2018: Viris L&L Sisal Matchpoint

Francesco Castegnaro (born 28 April 1994) is an Italian former track and road cyclist. He competed in the omnium event at the 2014 UCI Track Cycling World Championships. He finished third in the Gran Premio della Liberazione one-day race in 2015 and 2016.
