= Tim Veldt =

Dutch racing cyclist (born 1984)

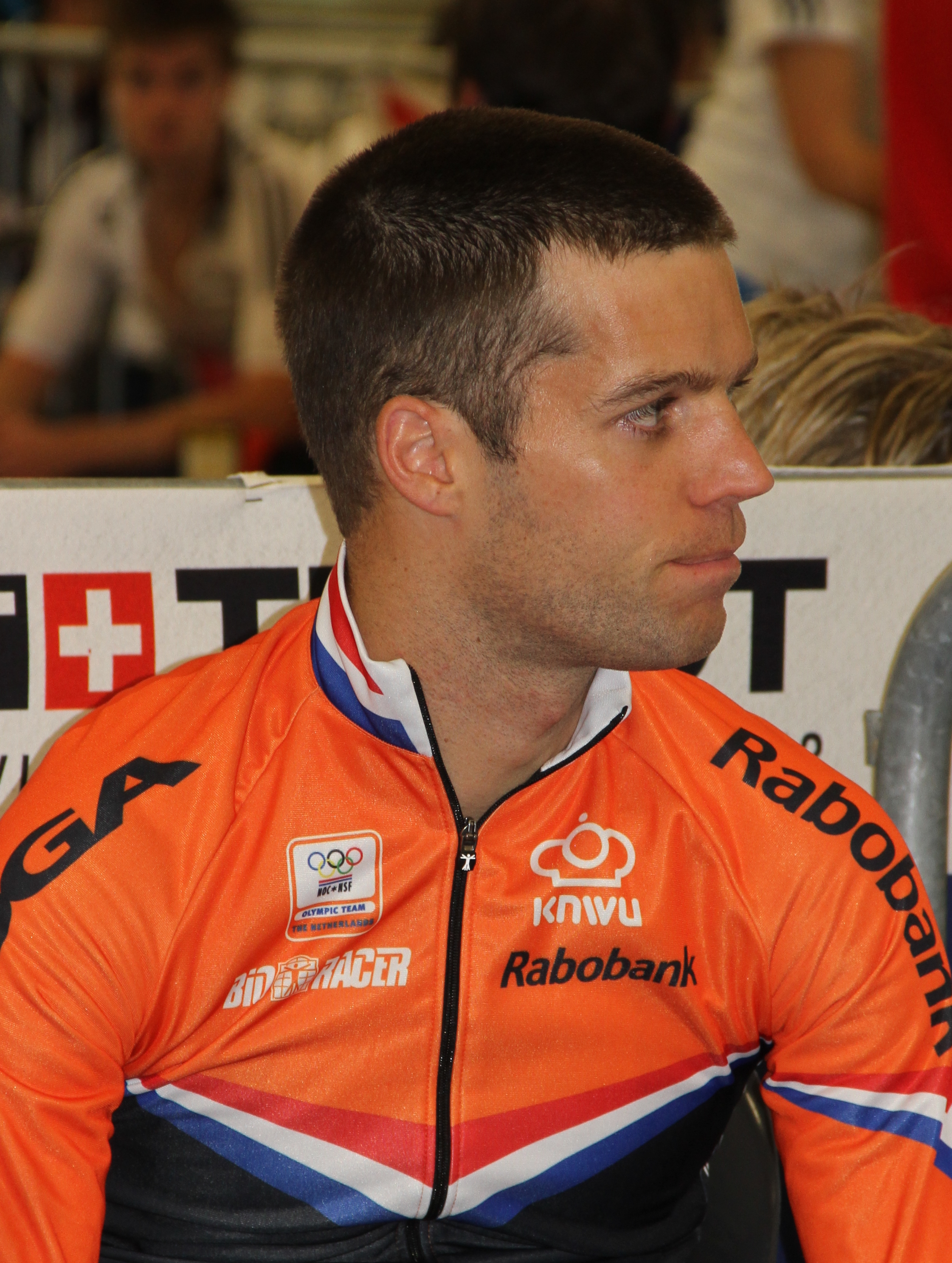
- Veldt at the 2015 UEC European Track Championships

Personal information
- Full name: Tim Veldt
- Born: 14 February 1984 (age 42) Amstelveen, Netherlands

Cycling career
- Sport: Cycling
- Current team: BEAT CC p/b Saxo
- Discipline: Track
- Role: Rider (retired); Directeur sportif
- Rider type: Sprinter

Managerial team
- 2017–: BEAT Cycling Club
Medal record
Representing Netherlands
Men's track cycling
World Championships
Silver medal – second place	2014 Cali	Omnium
European Championships
Silver medal – second place	2010 Pruszków	Omnium
Silver medal – second place	2013 Apeldoorn	Omnium
Bronze medal – third place	2010 Pruszków	Team Pursuit
Bronze medal – third place	2013 Apeldoorn	Team Pursuit

Tim Veldt (born 14 February 1984) is a Dutch former track cyclist, who currently works as a directeur sportif for both the road and track teams of BEAT CC p/b Saxo. During his career Veldt won two world cup classics in the team sprint, two European titles (under 23 1 km time trial and omnium) as well as three Dutch national titles (1 km time trial twice and keirin). During the 2005 UCI Track Cycling World Championships he won the silver medal in the team sprint together with Theo Bos and Teun Mulder.

Starting August 2017 Veldt became the coach of BEAT Cycling Club. In this team the riders are Matthijs Büchli, Theo Bos and Roy van den Berg.

== Major results ==
2003
National Track Championships

2nd Kilo
3rd Sprint

2004
1st Team sprint, 2004–05 UCI Track Cycling World Cup Classics, Los Angeles
National Track Championships

2nd Kilo
3rd Keirin
3rd Sprint

2005
National Track Championships

1st Kilo
1st Keirin
2nd Sprint

2nd Team sprint, UCI Track World Championships
2nd Kilo, 2004–05 UCI Track Cycling World Cup Classics, Sydney
2005–06 UCI Track Cycling World Cup Classics, Manchester

2nd Team sprint
3rd Kilo

3rd Kilo, UEC European Under-23 Track Championships
2006
1st Omnium, UEC European Track Championships
1st Kilo, UEC European Under-23 Track Championships
2005–06 UCI Track Cycling World Cup Classics

1st Team sprint, Moscow
2nd Kilo, Los Angeles

2006–07 UCI Track Cycling World Cup Classics

2nd Team sprint, Sydney
2nd Team sprint, Moscow
3rd Kilo, Sydney

National Track Championships

1st Kilo
3rd Sprint

2007
National Track Championships

1st Kilo
1st Sprint
3rd Keirin

2nd Rotterdam Sprint Cup
3rd Kilo, 2006–07 UCI Track Cycling World Cup Classics, Manchester
2008
National Track Championships

3rd Kilo
3rd Scratch

2009
National Track Championships

2nd Kilo
3rd Individual pursuit

2010
National Track Championships

1st Kilo
2nd Individual pursuit

2011
National Track Championships

1st Scratch
2nd Points race

2012
National Track Championships

1st Scratch
2nd Individual pursuit
2nd Points race

2013
UEC European Track Championships

2nd Omnium
3rd Team pursuit

2013–14 UCI Track Cycling World Cup, Manchester

2nd Omnium
National record, Team pursuit (4:03.033)

== See also ==
- List of Dutch Olympic cyclists
