= Unai Elorriaga =

Spanish cyclist

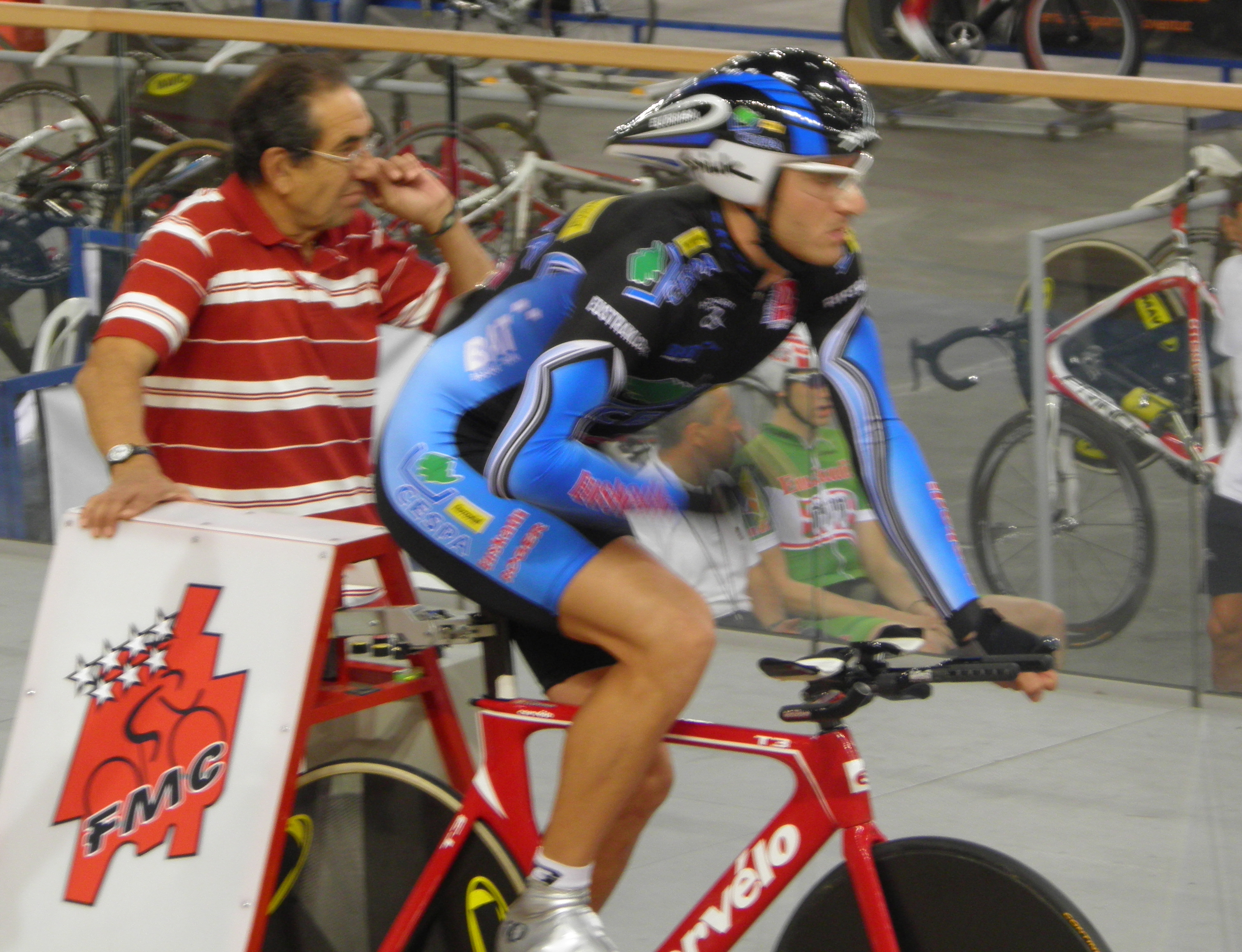
- Unai Elorriaga in 2010

Personal information
- Full name: Unai Elorriaga Zubiaur
- Born: 22 June 1980 (age 46) Barakaldo, Spain

Cycling career
- Sport: Cycling
- Disciplines: Track, road
- Role: Rider

Amateur teams
- 2000: Saunier Duval–Mapei
- 2001–2002: Cafe Baqué
- 2005–2006: Alfus–Tedes
- 2007–2012: Cespa–Euskadi
- 2013–2014: Eustrak–Euskadi
- 2015–2016: Zona Bike

Professional team
- 2003–2004: Cafés Baqué

Unai Elorriaga Zubiaur (born 22 June 1980) is a Spanish professional racing cyclist. He rode at the 2015 UCI Track Cycling World Championships.

== Major results ==
=== Track ===
2005
1st Points race, National Track Championships
2006
National Track Championships

2nd Madison
3rd Scratch

2007
National Track Championships

1st Madison (with Aitor Alonso)
3rd Points race

2009
National Track Championships

1st Points race
2nd Scratch

2008–09 UCI World Cup

1st Madison, Melbourne (with David Muntaner Juaneda)

2011
National Track Championships

1st Scratch
2nd Madison
3rd Points race

2012
2011–12 UCI World Cup

1st Overall Points race
1st Points race, Cali

National Track Championships

3rd Points race
3rd Team pursuit

2014
National Track Championships

2nd Scratch
2nd Team pursuit
2nd Madison
3rd Points race

2016
National Track Championships

2nd Team pursuit
3rd Madison

=== Road ===
2002
1st Road race, National Under-23 Road Championships
2005
5th Trofeo Alcudia
6th Trofeo Mallorca
2006
5th Overall Vuelta a la Comunidad de Madrid

1st Points classification
1st Stage 5
