= Adrian Tekliński =

Polish cyclist (born 1989)

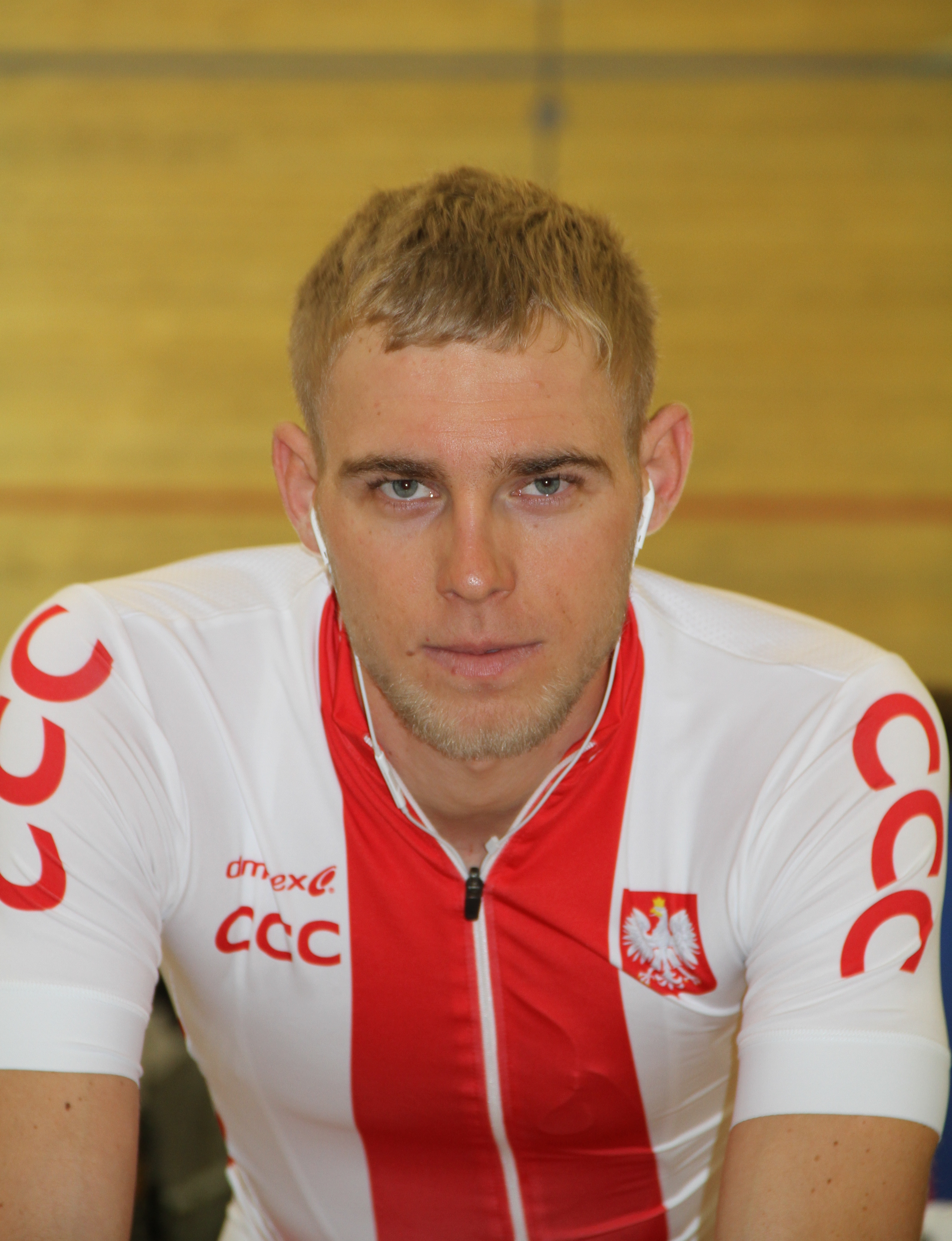
- Tekliński at the 2015 UEC European Track Championships

Personal information
- Born: 3 November 1989 (age 36) Brzeg, Poland

Cycling career
- Sport: Cycling
- Disciplines: Road; Track
- Role: Rider

Amateur teams
- 2014: Sante–BSA Ziemia
- 2018: Regional Warmia Mazury
- 2019: ALKS Stal–Ocetix–Iglotex
- 2020: KLTC Konin

Professional teams
- 2013: Bank BGŻ
- 2015: Kolss BDC Team
- 2016–2017: SKC TUFO Prostějov

Major wins
- Track Scratch, World Championships (2017)
Medal record
Representing Poland
World Championships
Gold medal – first place	2017 Hong Kong	Scratch
European Championships
Silver medal – second place	2016 Saint-Quentin-en-Yvelines	Scratch
Bronze medal – third place	2015 Grenchen	Scratch

Adrian Tekliński (born 3 November 1989) is a Polish road and track cyclist. He competed at every UCI Track Cycling World Championships between 2010 and 2019, except for 2014; he won the gold medal in the scratch in 2017. He won the bronze medal in the scratch at the 2015 UEC European Track Championships in Grenchen, Switzerland.

== Major results ==
2006
3rd Team sprint, UEC European Junior Track Championships
2009
3rd Team sprint, UEC European Under-23 Track Championships
2010
3rd Team sprint, UEC European Under-23 Track Championships
2014
10th Memoriał Andrzeja Trochanowskiego
2015
3rd Scratch, UEC European Track Championships
9th Memoriał Romana Siemińskiego
10th Memoriał Andrzeja Trochanowskiego
2016
2nd Scratch, UEC European Track Championships
2nd Memoriał Andrzeja Trochanowskiego
5th Visegrad 4 Bicycle Race – GP Slovakia
2017
1st Scratch, UCI Track World Championships
2018
8th Memoriał Andrzeja Trochanowskiego
