= 2008 in track cycling =

== World Championships ==
Men's Events	Winner
Sprint	Chris Hoy (GBR)
Keirin	Chris Hoy (GBR)
1 km time trial	Teun Mulder (NED)
Points race	Vasil Kiryienka (BLR)
Individual pursuit	Bradley Wiggins (GBR)
Scratch	Aliaksandr Lisouski (BLR)
Team sprint	France; Grégory Baugé; Kévin Sireau; Arnaud Tournant
Team pursuit	United Kingdom; Edward Clancy; Geraint Thomas; Paul Manning; Bradley Wiggins
Madison	United Kingdom; Mark Cavendish; Bradley Wiggins
Omnium	Hayden Godfrey (NZL)

Women's Events	Winner
Sprint	Victoria Pendleton (GBR)
Keirin	Jennie Reed (USA)
500 m time trial	Lisandra Guerra (CUB)
Points race	Marianne Vos (NED)
Individual pursuit	Rebecca Romero (GBR)
Scratch	Ellen van Dijk (NED)
Team sprint	United Kingdom; Victoria Pendleton; Shanaze Reade

== National Championships ==
(Netherlands) 2008 Dutch National Track Championships
(France) French National Track Championships
(Australia) Australian National Track Championships
(United Kingdom) British National Track Championships
United States National Track Championships

== Six-day events ==
The 2008 Six Days Track Cycling Events are multi-race competitions, each taking place over six days at various locations in mainland Europe. The riders challenge each other in track cycling disciplines including the madison, track time trials, sprints, and Derny motor-paced races.

The competitions are organised by the UCI.

Date	Place	Winners	Second	Third
17–22 October 2007	Amsterdam, Netherlands	Robert Bartko (GER); Iljo Keisse (BEL)	Robert Slippens (NED); Danny Stam (NED)	Peter Schep (NED); Erik Zabel (GER)
26–31 October 2007	Grenoble, France	Michael Mørkøv (DEN); Alex Rasmussen (DEN)	Alexander Äschbach (SUI); Dimitri De Fauw (BEL)	Jérôme Neuville (FRA); Marco Villa (ITA)
2–7 November 2007	Dortmund, Germany	Franco Marvulli (SUI); Bruno Risi (SUI)	Leif Lampater (GER); Erik Zabel (GER)	Robert Bartko (GER); Andreas Beikirch (GER)
9–14 November 2007	Munich, Germany	Franco Marvulli (SUI); Bruno Risi (SUI)	Leif Lampater (GER); Erik Zabel (GER)	Robert Slippens (NED); Danny Stam (NED)
20–25 November 2007	Ghent, Belgium; Six Days of Ghent	Robert Bartko (GER); Iljo Keisse (BEL)	Franco Marvulli (SUI); Bruno Risi (SUI)	Robert Slippens (NED); Danny Stam (NED)
11–16 December 2007	Zuidlaren, Netherlands	Franco Marvulli (SUI); Bruno Risi (SUI)	Andreas Beikirch (GER); Aart Vierhouten (NED)	Angelo Ciccone (ITA); Marco Villa (ITA)
17–22 December 2007	Maastricht, Netherlands	cancelled due to financial trouble.		
27 December–2 January 2008	Zürich, Switzerland	Franco Marvulli (SUI); Bruno Risi (SUI)	Robert Bartko (GER); Iljo Keisse (BEL)	Michael Mørkøv (DEN); Danny Stam (NED)
3–8 January 2008	Rotterdam, Netherlands	Leif Lampater (GER); Danny Stam (NED)	Franco Marvulli (SUI); Bruno Risi (SUI)	Robert Bartko (GER); Iljo Keisse (BEL)
10–15 January 2008	Bremen, Germany	Robert Bartko (GER); Iljo Keisse (BEL)	Leif Lampater (GER); Erik Zabel (GER)	Franco Marvulli (SUI); Bruno Risi (SUI)
17–22 January 2008	Stuttgart, Germany	Robert Bartko (GER); Iljo Keisse (BEL); Leif Lampater (GER)	Alexander Äschbach (SUI); Robert Fulst (GER); Bruno Risi (SUI)	Andreas Beikirch (GER); Gerd Dörich (GER); Erik Mohs (GER)
24–29 January 2008	Berlin, Germany	Franco Marvulli (SUI); Bruno Risi (SUI)	Robert Fulst (GER); Leif Lampater (GER)	Alexander Äschbach (SUI); Christian Lademann (GER)
31 January–5 February 2008	Copenhagen, Denmark	Franco Marvulli (SUI); Bruno Risi (SUI)	Michael Mørkøv (DEN); Alex Rasmussen (DEN)	Iljo Keisse (BEL); Danny Stam (NED)
7–12 February 2008	Hasselt, Belgium	Franco Marvulli (SUI); Bruno Risi (SUI)	Kenny De Ketele (BEL); Iljo Keisse (BEL)	Danny Stam (NED); Marco Villa (ITA)

== Other events ==
- Revolution (cycling series) – Season 5

== See also ==
- 2008 in women's road cycling
- 2008 in men's road cycling
- 2008 in sports
- 2007 in track cycling
