= 2008 in sports =

2008 in sports describes the year's events in world sport.

== American football ==
- Super Bowl XLII – the New York Giants (NFC) won 17–14 over the heavily favored New England Patriots (AFC)
  - Location: University of Phoenix Stadium
  - Attendance: 71,101
  - MVP: Eli Manning, QB (New York)
- BCS National Championship Game at Sugar Bowl (2007 season):
  - The Louisiana State Tigers won 38–24 over the Ohio State Buckeyes to win the BCS National Championship, thus becoming the first two-time BCS National Champions, and the first BCS titlists with two losses in a single season.
- September 7 – In the New England Patriots' season opener, quarterback Tom Brady suffers a torn ACL that ruled him out for the season, a year after he led the Patriots to a 16–0 record (the first undefeated team since the NFL's 16-game expansion in 1978) and a Super Bowl XLII appearance.
- September 21 – The New England Patriots lost to the Miami Dolphins to end their NFL-record 21-game regular-season winning streak dating back to December 2006, which coincidentally, was also against the Dolphins.
- December 28 – The Miami Dolphins finish 11-5 and become the first team in NFL history to win their division after winning only one game the year before, and it also marked the last non-Patriot division title in the AFC East until the 2020 NFL season.
- The Detroit Lions became the first team since the 1976 Tampa Bay Buccaneers to lose all their regular season games. They lost an NFL record 16 games during the season. The Lions would be joined by the Cleveland Browns 9 years later as the second team to go winless since the NFL expanded to a 16-game schedule in 1978.

== Archery ==
- 2008 Meteksan Archery World Cup takes place at Santo Domingo, Dominican Republic. Leading medal winners are USA, Italy and Russia.

== Association football ==
- Egypt win the 2008 Africa Cup of Nations 1–0 over Cameroon. It is the sixth title in the competition for the Pharaohs.
- Manchester United wins the UEFA Champions League, defeating another English side Chelsea by penalty shootout 6–5, after a draw of 1–1 at the final.
- Spain defeated Germany 1–0 in the final of the 2008 UEFA European Football Championships
- LDU Quito wins the 2008 Copa Libertadores, defeating Fluminense in the final.

== Australian rules football ==
- Papua New Guinea win the 2008 Australian Football International Cup defeating New Zealand 7.12.54 to 7.4.46 in the Grand Final. A special 'Peace Team' composed of local Israeli and Palestinian players competed in the tournament.
- Hawthorn defeat Geelong 18.7.115 to 11.23.89 in the 2008 AFL Grand Final to win their tenth premiership. The crowd of 100,012 at the MCG is the largest at a VFL/AFL Grand Final since the 1986 VFL Grand Final.
- North Ballarat defeat Port Melbourne 18.12.120 to 11.9.75 in the 2008 VFL Grand Final at the Telstra Dome. This is the club's first VFL premiership in its 13th season in the league.

== Baseball ==
- Fresno State University Bulldogs made history by becoming the biggest underdogs to win an NCAA championship by beating their University of Georgia namesakes in the 2008 College World Series in Omaha, Nebraska
- For the first time in both World Series and post-season history, a contest is suspended during an official game as Game Five is halted in the sixth inning with a tie score of 2–2 between the Tampa Bay Rays and the Philadelphia Phillies at Citizens Bank Park. The game resumes two days later and the Phillies clinch their second World Championship with a 4–3 victory, winning the 2008 World Series in five games. Cole Hamels was named the World Series Most Valuable Player.
- Japan Series winners Saitama Seibu Lions won the 2008 Asia Series by beating Taiwan Series winners Uni-President 7-Eleven Lions by 1–0 at the final at Tokyo Dome

== Basketball ==
- University of Kansas Jayhawks defeat the Memphis Tigers in the championship game of the NCAA men's basketball tournament, 75–68 in overtime in San Antonio, Texas. The Jayhawks' Mario Chalmers was named the tournament's Most Outstanding Player.
- University of Tennessee Knoxville Lady Vols, led by Most Outstanding Player Candace Parker's hustle, defeated the Leland Stanford Jr. University Cardinal, 64–48 to win their second consecutive NCAA women's basketball tournament in Tampa, Florida, and their eighth overall.
- Boston Celtics win their seventeenth NBA Championship by defeating the Los Angeles Lakers in six games in the 2008 NBA Finals. Paul Pierce was named Finals MVP.
- Euroleague won by CSKA Moscow of Russia by defeating Maccabi Tel Aviv 91–77 in the final
- The Detroit Shock would win their 3rd championship in franchise history after sweeping the league-best San Antonio Silver Stars in the 2008 WNBA Finals. It was the first sweep in the finals in a best-of-5 series.
- The Melbourne Tigers defeat the Sydney Kings in five games in the NBL Grand Final series to win their fourth championship.

== Bowls ==
- April – World Indoor Singles and Mixed Pairs Championship held at Bowls Stadium, Swansea

== Boxing ==
- February 23 – Wladimir Klitschko defeats WBO heavyweight champion Sultan Ibragimov at Madison Square Garden in New York City, to unify the IBF and WBO Heavyweight titles. The Klitschko-Ibragimov fight was the first heavyweight unification bout since Holyfield-Lewis in 1999.
- March 8 – David Haye achieves a TKO of Enzo Maccarinelli in the second round in a unification fight for the WBC, WBA and WBO cruiserweight titles.
- April 19 – Joe Calzaghe, fighting for the first time in the US, wins a 12-round split decision over Bernard Hopkins for the latter's world light heavyweight title
- June 28 – Manny Pacquiao defeats David Díaz via 9th-round knockout to take the WBC lightweight crown, his 4th world title in 4 divisions.
- October 18 – Bernard Hopkins beats then-undefeated Kelly Pavlik via unanimous decision. Throughout the fight, Hopkins, although 17 years older than Pavlik, managed to outwork and outhustle Pavlik throughout the fight.
- November 8 – Joe Calzaghe remains unbeaten after 46 fights with a 12-round unanimous decision over Roy Jones Jr. at Madison Square Garden in New York City.
- December 6 – Manny Pacquiao defeats Oscar De La Hoya after eight rounds in a fight billed as "The Dream Match" in Las Vegas, when De La Hoya couldn't answer the bell for the ninth round. It was officially a technical knockout.

== Canadian football ==
- November 23 – The Calgary Stampeders win the 96th Grey Cup game, defeating the Montreal Alouettes 22–14 at Olympic Stadium in Montreal.

== Cycling ==
=== Road Cycling ===
Grand Tours:

- Carlos Sastre wins the 2008 Tour de France.
- Alberto Contador wins the 2008 Giro d'Italia.
- Alberto Contador wins the 2008 Vuelta a España.

=== Track Cycling ===
==== 2008 UCI Track Cycling World Championships ====
Men's Events	Winner
Sprint	Chris Hoy (GBR)
Keirin	Chris Hoy (GBR)
1 km time trial	Teun Mulder (NED)
Points race	Vasil Kiryienka (BLR)
Individual pursuit	Bradley Wiggins (GBR)
Scratch	Aliaksandr Lisouski (BLR)
Team sprint	France; Grégory Baugé; Kévin Sireau; Arnaud Tournant
Team pursuit	United Kingdom; Edward Clancy; Geraint Thomas; Paul Manning; Bradley Wiggins
Madison	United Kingdom; Mark Cavendish; Bradley Wiggins
Omnium	Hayden Godfrey (NZL)

Women's Events	Winner
Sprint	Victoria Pendleton (GBR)
Keirin	Jennie Reed (USA)
500 m time trial	Lisandra Guerra (CUB)
Points race	Marianne Vos (NED)
Individual pursuit	Rebecca Romero (GBR)
Scratch	Ellen van Dijk (NED)
Team sprint	United Kingdom; Victoria Pendleton; Shanaze Reade

== Competition aerobatics ==
- Mikhail Mamistov won the 16th FAI European Aerobatic Championships in Hradec Králové, Czech Republic
- Ferenc Tóth won the 9th FAI European Glider Aerobatic Championships in Radom.

== Cricket ==
- Rajasthan Royals win the inaugural Indian Premier League.
- 2008 U/19 Cricket World Cup was held in Malaysia from February 17, 2008, to March 2, 2008.

== Diving ==
- FINA Diving World Cup concludes with China taking 7 gold and 4 silver medals

== Figure skating ==
- March – 2008 World Figure Skating Championships held at Göteborg

== Floorball ==
- Men's World Floorball Championships
  - Champion: Finland
- Women's under-19 World Floorball Championships
  - Champion: Switzerland
- EuroFloorball Cup 2007–08
  - Men's champion: (Sweden) AIK IBF
  - Women's champion: (Switzerland) UHC Dietlikon
- EuroFloorball Cup 2008
  - Men's champion: (Sweden) AIK IBF
  - Women's champion: (Sweden) IKSU innebandy

== Gliding ==
- The winners of the 30th FAI World Gliding Championships in Lüsse are Michael Sommer (Open Class), György Gulyas (15m Class) and Olivier Darroze (18m Class).
- Laurent Couture (World Class), Michael Buchthal (Standard Class) and Matthias Sturm (Club Class) won the gold medals in the 30th FAI World Gliding Championships in Rieti, Italy.

== Golf ==
- The Masters – Trevor Immelman wins his first major.
- Tiger Woods wins the 2008 U.S. Open Golf Championship over Rocco Mediate following an eighteen-hole playoff which they tie at even par. This forces a sudden death playoff on the seventh hole and Woods makes a par to Mediate's bogey.
- United States defeats Europe to win the 2008 Ryder Cup at Valhalla Golf Club in Louisville, Kentucky

== Handball ==
- 2008 European Men's Handball Championship: Denmark
- 2008 European Women's Handball Championship: Norway

== Horse racing ==
Steeplechases

- Cheltenham Gold Cup – Denman
- Grand National – Comply or Die

Flat races

- Australia – Melbourne Cup won by Viewed
- Canadian Triple Crown:
  1. Queen's Plate – Not Bourbon
  2. Prince of Wales Stakes – Harlem Rocker
  3. Breeders' Stakes – Marlang
- Dubai – Dubai World Cup won by Curlin
- France – Prix de l'Arc de Triomphe won by Zarkava
- Ireland – Irish Derby Stakes won by Frozen Fire
- Japan – Japan Cup won by Screen Hero
- English Triple Crown Races:
  1. 2,000 Guineas Stakes – Henrythenavigator
  2. The Derby – New Approach
  3. St. Leger Stakes – Conduit
- United States Triple Crown Races:
  1. Kentucky Derby – Big Brown
  2. Preakness Stakes – Big Brown
  3. Belmont Stakes – Da' Tara
- Breeders' Cup World Thoroughbred Championships:
  - Day 1:
    1. Breeders' Cup Filly & Mare Sprint – Ventura
    2. Breeders' Cup Juvenile Fillies Turf – Maram
    3. Breeders' Cup Juvenile Fillies – Stardom Bound
    4. Breeders' Cup Filly & Mare Turf – Forever Together
    5. Breeders' Cup Ladies' Classic – Zenyatta
  - Day 2:
    1. Breeders' Cup Marathon – Muhannak
    2. Breeders' Cup Turf Sprint – Desert Code
    3. Breeders' Cup Dirt Mile – Albertus Maximus
    4. Breeders' Cup Mile – Goldikova
    5. Breeders' Cup Juvenile – Midshipman
    6. Breeders' Cup Juvenile Turf – Donativum
    7. Breeders' Cup Sprint – Midnight Lute
    8. Breeders' Cup Turf – Conduit
    9. Breeders' Cup Classic – Raven's Pass

== Ice hockey ==
- Detroit Red Wings win the Stanley Cup defeating the Pittsburgh Penguins 4 games to 2.
  - The Red Wings' Henrik Zetterberg wins the Conn Smythe Trophy as MVP of the Stanley Cup playoffs.
  - Zetterberg and his Wings and Sweden teammates Niklas Kronwall and Mikael Samuelsson join the Triple Gold Club, made up of individuals who have won the Stanley Cup and gold medals at the Olympics and World Championships.
- IIHF World Championships: Russia wins the gold medal by defeating Canada in overtime in the final
- A first season of Kontinental Hockey League was held, replaced from Russian Superleague on September 2.

== Lacrosse ==
- March 16 – Budapest Blax Lacrosse team is founded.
- May 26 – Syracuse University wins the 2008 NCAA Division I Men's Lacrosse Championship
- August 7 – Federation of International Lacrosse, the new unified governing body for the sport, holds its first meeting. The body was formed with the merger of the former governing bodies for the men's and women's versions, respectively the International Lacrosse Federation and International Federation of Women's Lacrosse Associations.

== Mixed martial arts ==
The following is a list of major noteworthy MMA events by month.

January

1/19 – UFC 80: Rapid Fire

1/23 – UFC Fight Night: Swick vs Burkman

1/25 – ShoXC 4

February

2/1 – Strikeforce: Young Guns II

2/2 – UFC 81: Breaking Point

2/13 – WEC 32: Condit vs. Prater

2/16 – EliteXC: Street Certified

2/23 – Strikeforce: At The Dome

2/29 – IFL: Las Vegas (Start of 2008 IFL season)

March

3/1 – UFC 82: Pride of a Champion

3/5 – World Victory Road Presents: Sengoku 1 (Sengoku Raiden Championship's first event)

3/15 – DREAM.1 (DREAM's first event)

3/21 – ShoXC 5

3/26 – WEC 33: Marshall vs. Stann

3/29 – Strikeforce: Shamrock vs. Le

April

4/2 – UFC Fight Night: Florian vs Lauzon

4/4 – IFL: New Blood, New Battles 2

4/5 – ShoXC 6

4/11 YAMMA Pit Fighting 1 (YAMMA Pit Fighting's first and only event)

4/19 – UFC 83: Serra vs. St-Pierre 2

4/29 – DREAM.2

May

5/11 – DREAM.3

5/16 – IFL: Connecticut (Last IFL event; 2008 Season never completely finished)

5/18 – World Victory Road Presents: Sengoku 2

5/24 – UFC 84: Ill Will

5/31 – EliteXC: Primetime

June

6/1 – WEC 34: Faber vs. Pulver

6/7 – UFC 85: Bedlam

6/8 – World Victory Road Presents: Sengoku 3

6/14 – EliteXC: Return of the King

6/15 – DREAM.4

6/21 – The Ultimate Fighter: Team Rampage vs Team Forrest Finale

6/27 – Strikeforce: Melendez vs. Thomson

July

7/5 – UFC 86: Jackson vs. Griffin

7/19 – UFC: Silva vs. Irvin

7/19 – Affliction: Banned (Affliction's first event)

7/21 – DREAM.5

7/26 – EliteXC: Unfinished Business

August

8/3 – WEC 35: Condit vs. Miura

8/9 – UFC 87: Seek And Destroy

8/15 – ShoXC 7

8/24 – World Victory Road Presents: Sengoku 4

September

9/6 – UFC 88: Breakthrough

9/13 – Strikeforce: Young Guns III

9/17 – UFC Fight Night: Diaz vs Neer

9/20 – Strikeforce: At The Mansion II

9/23 – DREAM.6

9/26 – ShoXC 8

9/28 – World Victory Road Presents: Sengoku 5

October

10/3 – Strikeforce: Payback

10/4 – EliteXC: Heat

10/10 – ShoXC 9 (Last EliteXC event)

10/18 – UFC 89: Bisping vs. Leben

10/25 – UFC 90: Silva vs. Côté

November

11/1 – World Victory Road Presents: Sengoku 6

11/5 – WEC 36: Faber vs. Brown

11/15 – UFC 91: Couture vs. Lesnar

11/21 – Strikeforce: Destruction

December

12/3 – WEC 37: Torres vs. Tapia

12/10 – UFC: Fight for the Troops

12/13 – The Ultimate Fighter: Team Nogueira vs Team Mir Finale

12/27 – UFC 92: The Ultimate 2008

12/31 – Dynamite!! 2008 (Event featured ten DREAM MMA bouts and eight K-1 kickboxing bouts)

== Netball ==
International tournaments

Date	Tournament	Winners	Runners up
20–25 July	2008 AFNA Championships	Jamaica	Trinidad and Tobago
13–18 October	2008 Taini Jamison Trophy Series	New Zealand	England

Major leagues

Host	League	Winners	Runners up
Australia/New Zealand	ANZ Championship	New South Wales Swifts	Waikato Bay of Plenty Magic
United Kingdom	Netball Superleague	Galleria Mavericks	Loughborough Lightning

== Olympic Games ==
- August 8 – Games of the XXIX Olympiad open in Beijing

== Paragliding ==
- Greg Blondeau won the 10th FAI European Paragliding Championship in Niš, Serbia. Ewa Wisnierska won the gold medal in the female category.

== Polo ==
- Chile defeats Brazil to win the 2008 World Polo Championship in México

== Radiosport ==
- 14th Amateur Radio Direction Finding World Championship held at Hwaseong, South Korea

== Rotorcraft ==
- Viktor Korotaev (pilot) and Nikolay Burov (co-pilot) won the 13th World Helicopter Championship in Eisenach.

== Rowing ==
- The Oxford and Cambridge Boat Race – Oxford University beat Cambridge University to gain their third victory in five years.

== Rugby league ==
- February 29 at Elland Road, Leeds – 2008 World Club Challenge is won by the Leeds Rhinos who defeat the Melbourne Storm 11–4 before 33,204
- April 17 at Sydney – 2008 marks the centenary of rugby league in Australia and an Australian rugby league team of the century is announced
- May 9 at the Sydney Cricket Ground – 2008 ANZAC Day Test match is won by Australia 28–12 over New Zealand before 34,571
- July 2 at ANZ Stadium, Sydney – 2008 State of Origin is won by Queensland in the third and deciding match of the series against New South Wales before 78,751
- August 30 at Wembley Stadium – 2008 Challenge Cup culminates in St. Helens' 28–16 win against Hull F.C. in the final before 82,821.
- October 4 at Old Trafford, Manchester – Super League XIII culminates in the Leeds Rhinos' 24–16 win against St. Helens in the Grand Final before 68,810
- October 5 at ANZ Stadium, Sydney – 2008 NRL season culminates in the Manly Warringah Sea Eagles' record-breaking 40–0 win against the Melbourne Storm in the 2008 NRL Grand Final before 80,388
- November 19 at Sydney – 2008 Golden Boot award for best international player is won by Australia's Billy Slater
- November 22 at Suncorp Stadium, Brisbane – 2008 World Cup tournament culminates in New Zealand's 34–20 win against Australia in the final before 50,599

== Rugby union ==
- 114th Six Nations Championship series is won by Wales who complete the Grand Slam

== Ski mountaineering ==
- 2008 World Championship of Ski Mountaineering held at Portes du Soleil, Switzerland

== Tennis ==
- Australian Open
  - Men's Final: Novak Djokovic defeats Jo-Wilfried Tsonga 4–6, 6–4, 6–3, 7–6(2)
  - Women's Final: Maria Sharapova defeats Ana Ivanovic 7–5, 6–3
- French Open
  - Men's Final: Rafael Nadal defeats Roger Federer 6–1, 6–3, 6–0
  - Women's Final: Ana Ivanovic defeats Dinara Safina 6–4, 6–3
- Wimbledon Championships
  - Men's Final: Rafael Nadal defeats Roger Federer 6–4, 6–4, 6–7(5), 6–7(8), 9–7
  - Ladies' Final: Venus Williams defeats Serena Williams 7–5, 6–4
- US Open
  - Men's Final: Roger Federer defeats Andy Murray 6–2, 7–5, 6–2
  - Women's Final: Serena Williams defeats Jelena Janković 6–4, 7–5

Rafael Nadal claimed the World No. 1 ranking for the first time, on August 18, replacing Roger Federer

== Water polo ==
- 2008 Men's European Water Polo Championship: Montenegro
- 2008 Women's European Water Polo Championship: Russia
- 2008 FINA Men's Water Polo World League : Serbia
- 2008 FINA Women's Water Polo World League : Russia

== Weightlifting ==
- European Championships held at Lignano Sabbiadoro, Italy
