= Marcel Kalz =

German cyclist (born 1987)

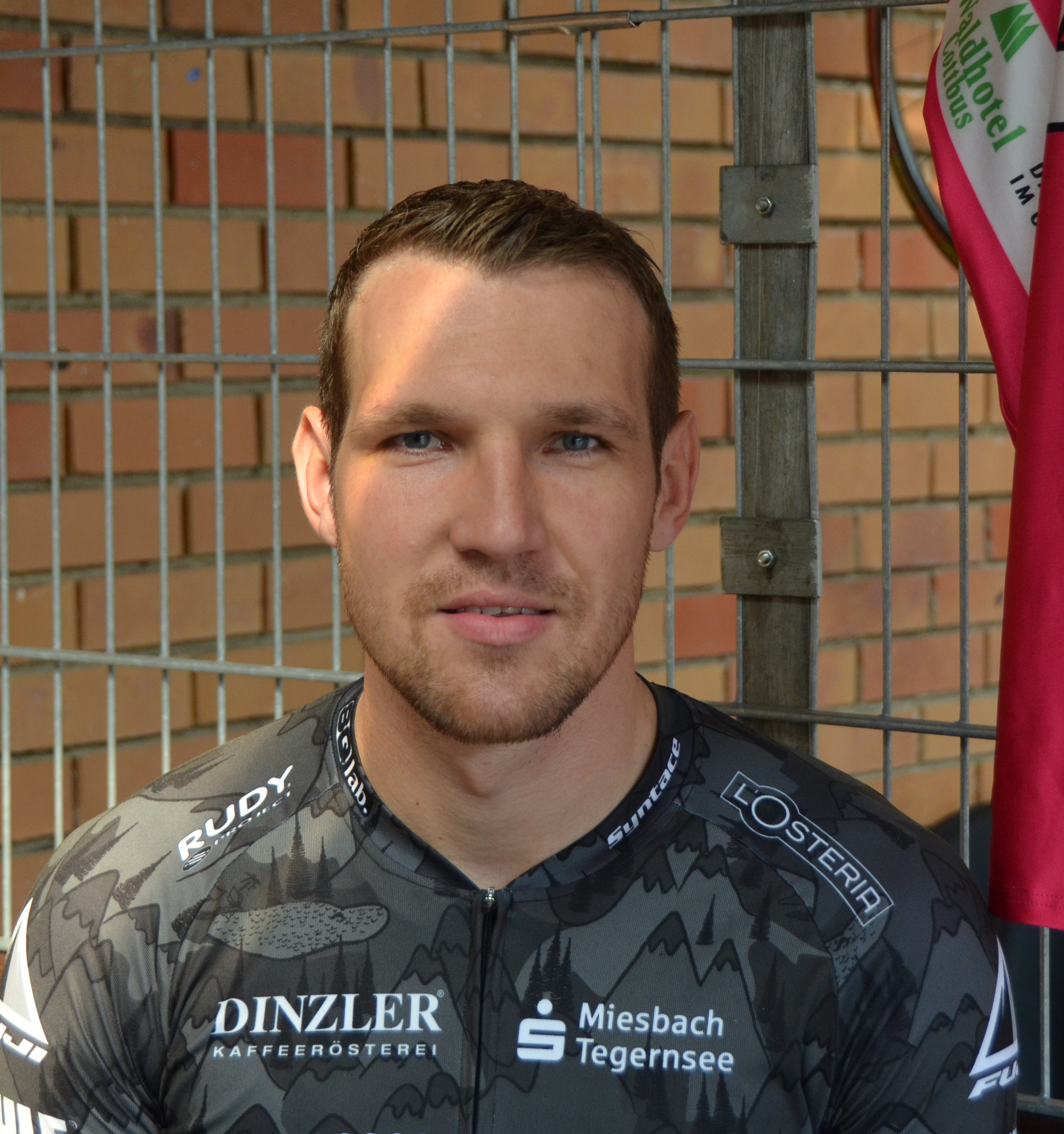
- Kalz in 2014

Personal information
- Born: 9 March 1987 (age 39) Berlin, Germany

Cycling career
- Sport: Cycling
- Current team: Retired
- Disciplines: Track; Road
- Role: Rider

Amateur teams
- 2006–2010: KED Bianchi Team Berlin
- 2014–2017: Maloja Pushbikers
- 2016: RSV Irschenberg

Marcel Kalz (born 9 March 1987) is a German former road and track cyclist.

== Major results ==
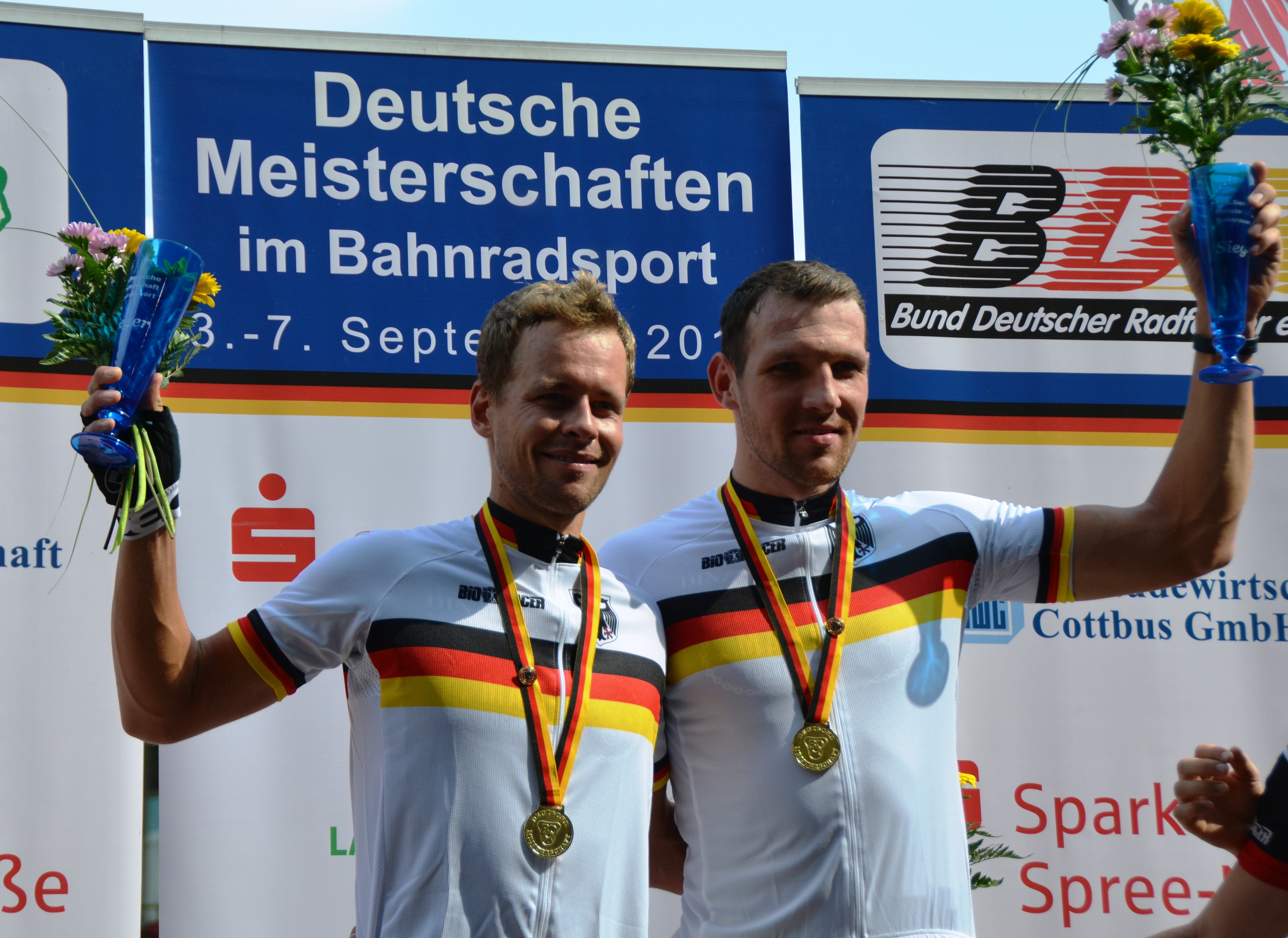
Kalz with Leif Lampater after winning the German National Madison Championships in 2014

=== Track ===
2004
1st Points race, National Junior Championships
2005
1st Madison, National Junior Championships (with Norman Dimde)
2nd Madison, UCI Junior World Championships
2006
3rd Madison, UEC European Under-23 Track Championships
2007
1st Madison (with Erik Mohs), UEC European Under-23 Track Championships
1st Madison, National Championships (with Robert Bengsch)
2008
1st Madison, National Championships (with Robert Bengsch)
2011
1st Madison, National Championships (with Robert Bengsch)
2012
1st Madison, National Championships (with Robert Bengsch)
2013
1st Six Days of Bremen (with Franco Marvulli)
1st Points race, National Championships
2014
1st Six Days of Copenhagen (with Robert Bartko)
1st Madison, National Championships (with Leif Lampater)
2nd Six Days of Bremen (with Robert Bartko)
2015
1st Six Days of Berlin (with Leif Lampater)
1st Six Days of Bremen (with Alex Rasmussen)
1st Points race, National Championships
2017
1st Six Days of Bremen (with Iljo Keisse)

=== Road ===
2011
1st Stage 1 Bałtyk–Karkonosze Tour
2013
1st Harlem Skyscraper Classic
2015
3rd Madeira Criterium
2016
1st Harlem Skyscraper Classic
