= List of career achievements by Mark Cavendish =

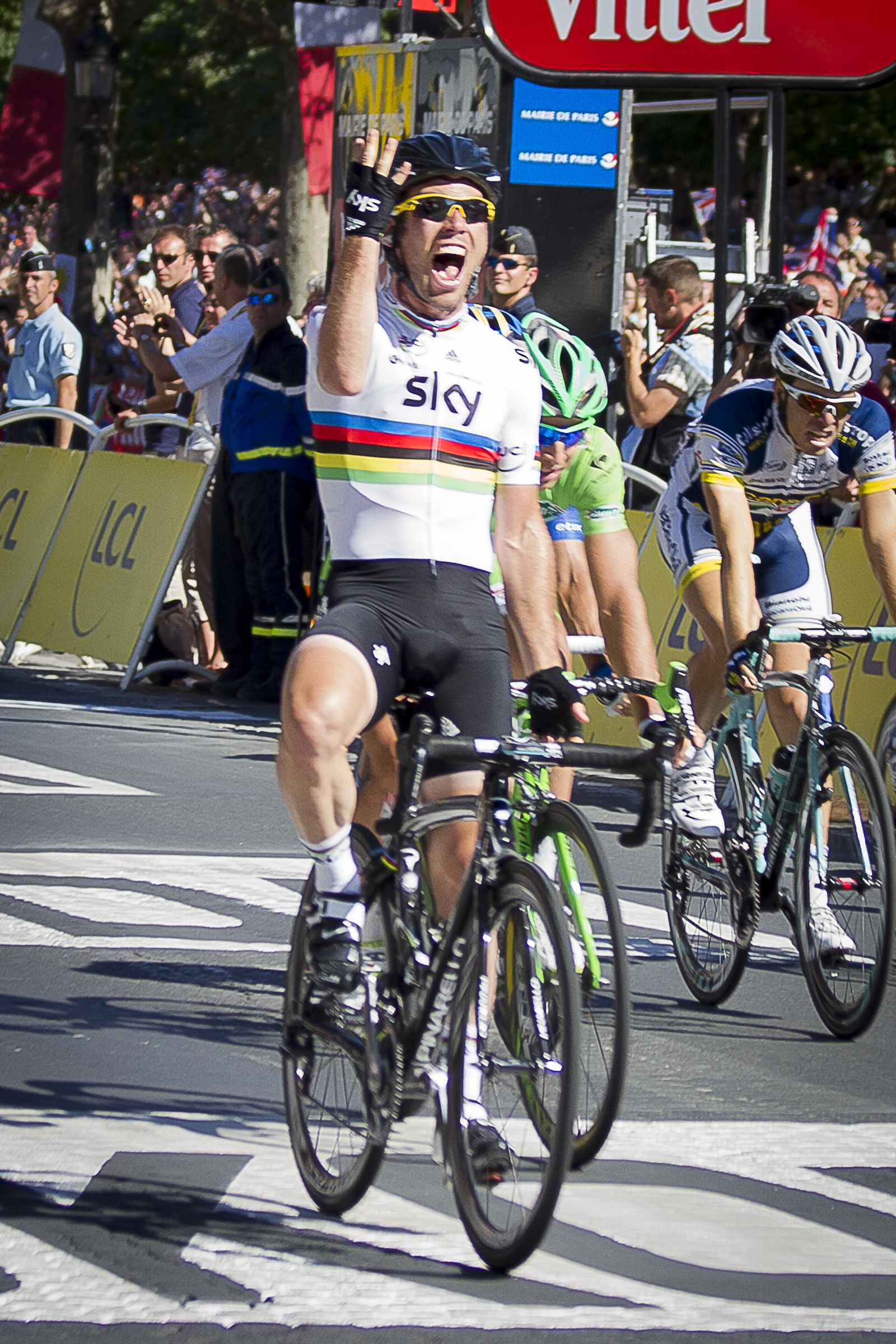
- Cavendish winning the final stage of the 2012 Tour de France, in the world champion's rainbow jersey

Cycling career
- Sport: Cycling

Major wins
- Road Grand Tours Tour de France Points classification (2011, 2021) 35 individual stages (2008–2013, 2015, 2016, 2021, 2024) Giro d'Italia Points classification (2013) 17 individual stages (2008, 2009, 2011–2013, 2022, 2023) 2 TTT stages (2009, 2011) Vuelta a España Points classification (2010) 3 individual stages (2010) 1 TTT stage (2010) Stage races Ster ZLM Toer (2012) Tour of Qatar (2013, 2016) Dubai Tour (2015) One-day races and Classics World Road Race Championships (2011) National Road Race Championships (2013, 2022) Milan–San Remo (2009) Scheldeprijs (2007, 2008, 2011) Kuurne–Brussels–Kuurne (2012, 2015) Milano–Torino (2022) Münsterland Giro (2021) Track World Championships Madison (2005, 2008, 2016)
Medal record
Men's road bicycle racing
Representing Great Britain
World Championships
Gold medal – first place	2011 Copenhagen	Road race
Silver medal – second place	2016 Doha	Road race
Representing Isle of Man
Island Games
Gold medal – first place	2003 Guernsey	Individual criterium
Gold medal – first place	2003 Guernsey	Team road race
Gold medal – first place	2003 Guernsey	Team time trial
Men's track cycling
Representing Great Britain
Olympic Games
Silver medal – second place	2016 Rio de Janeiro	Omnium
World Championships
Gold medal – first place	2005 Los Angeles	Madison
Gold medal – first place	2008 Manchester	Madison
Gold medal – first place	2016 London	Madison
Representing Isle of Man
Commonwealth Games
Gold medal – first place	2006 Melbourne	Scratch

This is a list of career achievements by Mark Cavendish, a former professional racing cyclist from the Isle of Man, who rode professionally between 2005 and 2024.

Originally competing in endurance events in track cycling, Cavendish won gold medals at the 2005 UCI Track Cycling World Championships and the 2006 Commonwealth Games before he moved into road racing in 2006, specialising as a sprinter. During his road racing career, Cavendish won the road race at the 2011 UCI Road World Championships, a record 35 stages at the Tour de France, and ranks third overall for Grand Tour stage wins with 55. With a total of 165 professional victories, he ranks second on the all-time list to Eddy Merckx. Cavendish won a further two world titles at the 2008 UCI Track Cycling World Championships and the 2016 UCI Track Cycling World Championships, and a silver medal in the omnium at the 2016 Summer Olympics.

He was voted as the winner of the 2011 BBC Sports Personality of the Year Award following his World Championships victory, and received the BBC Sports Personality of the Year Lifetime Achievement Award in 2024. For his services to British cycling, Cavendish was appointed as an MBE in the 2011 Birthday Honours, and was knighted in the 2024 Birthday Honours.

== Career highlights ==
2005

- Won the first of his Madison UCI Track Cycling World Championships titles.

2006

- Won the scratch race at the 2006 Commonwealth Games, for the Isle of Man's third ever gold medal at the Games.

2007

- He equalled Alessandro Petacchi's record of 11 professional wins in a début season.

2009

- Became the second British rider—after Tom Simpson—to win one of the five monuments of cycling with victory in the 2009 Milan–San Remo.
- Became first British rider to wear the general classification leader's pink jersey at the Giro d'Italia.
- Passed Barry Hoban's record of 8 for most Tour de France stage wins by a British rider and Chris Boardman's record of 41 for most professional victories by a British rider.

2010

- Became the second British rider—after Robert Millar—to win a stage in all three of the Grand Tours with victory at stage 12 of the 2010 Vuelta a España. He went on to win the points classification in the Vuelta a España, his first points classification victory in a Grand Tour.

2011

- Tied Piet Oellibrandt for the most wins in the Scheldeprijs one day semi-classic, with a third victory at the Antwerp race.
- At the 2011 Tour de France he became the first British rider to win the Tour de France points classification.
- Became the second British rider—after Tom Simpson—to win the UCI Road Race World Championship.

2012

- Became the first rider to win the final Champs-Élysées stage in the Tour de France four years in a row (2009–2012).
- Became the first rainbow jersey holder to win the final stage of the Tour de France.
- Became the most successful sprinter in Tour de France history with his 23rd stage victory giving him more mass start stage victories in the Tour than any other rider.

2013

- Claimed the second overall classification win of his career at the Tour of Qatar, with four consecutive stage victories out of six.
- Achieved 100 professional wins with victory on stage 12 of the 2013 Giro d'Italia.
- Completed his set of Grand Tour points classifications with his points classification win at the Giro d'Italia, becoming the 5th rider in history to do so.

2015

- Claimed the third overall victory of his career at the 2015 Dubai Tour, winning two of the four stages.

2016

- Claimed the fourth overall victory of his career at the Tour of Qatar, winning one of the five stages.
- Completed his set of overall classification lead jerseys in Grand Tours upon winning the opening stage of the Tour de France.
- Claimed his first Olympic medal, winning the silver medal in the omnium at the Olympics in Rio de Janeiro.

2021

- Cavendish claimed his 50th Grand Tour stage victory, winning stage 6 of the 2021 Tour de France.
- Cavendish equalled Eddy Merckx's record for the most number of Tour de France stage wins (34), with his third stage win during the 2021 Tour de France.

2024

- Cavendish sets the record for most stage wins at the Tour de France, claiming his 35th stage victory.

== Major results ==
=== Road ===
2003
Island Games

1st Team road race
1st Team time trial

2nd Road race, National Junior Championships

2004 – Team Persil
1st Stage 1 Girvan 3 Day

2005 – Team Sparkasse
1st Stage 5 Tour de Berlin
8th Rund um die Nürnberger Altstadt

2006 – Team Sparkasse, T-Mobile Team (1 pro win)
1st Points classification, Tour of Britain
1st Stage 3 Course de la Solidarité Olympique
1st Stage 4 Thüringen Rundfahrt der U23
2nd Overall Tour de Berlin

1st Stages 3b & 4

4th Sparkassen Giro Bochum
7th Road race, Commonwealth Games

2007 — T-Mobile Team (11)
1st Scheldeprijs
Four Days of Dunkirk

1st Points classification
1st Stages 3 & 6

Tour of Britain

1st Points classification
1st Sprints classification
1st Prologue & Stage 1

Danmark Rundt

1st Points classification
1st Stage 6

Eneco Tour

1st Points classification
1st Stage 2

Volta a Catalunya

1st Stages 2 & 6

1st Stage 4 Ster Elektrotoer
2nd Overall Circuit Franco-Belge

1st Young rider classification
1st Stage 3

6th Philadelphia International Championship

2008 — Team High Road (17)
1st Scheldeprijs
Tour de France

1st Stages 5, 8, 12 & 13

Giro d'Italia

1st Stages 4 & 13

Tour of Missouri

1st Points classification
1st Stages 1, 2 & 6

Tour of Ireland

1st Stages 1, 2 & 3

Three Days of De Panne

1st Stages 2 & 3a

1st Prologue Tour de Romandie
1st Stage 5 Ster Elektrotoer
5th Road race, National Championships

2009 — Team Columbia–High Road (23)
1st Milan–San Remo
1st Sparkassen Giro Bochum
Tour de France

1st Stages 2, 3, 10, 11, 19 & 21
Held after Stages 2–6, 10 & 11

Giro d'Italia

1st Stages 1 (TTT), 9, 11 & 13
Held & after Stages 1 & 2

Tour of California

1st Sprints classification
1st Stages 4 & 5

Three Days of De Panne

1st Points classification
1st Stages 2 & 3a

Tour de Suisse

1st Stages 3 & 6

Tour of Missouri

1st Stages 1 & 2

1st Stage 7 Tirreno–Adriatico
1st Stage 2 Tour of Ireland
4th Amstel Curaçao Race
8th UCI World Ranking
9th Overall Tour of Qatar

1st Stages 4 & 6

2010 — Team HTC–Columbia (11)
Tour de France

1st Stages 5, 6, 11, 18 & 20

Vuelta a España

1st Points classification
1st Stages 1 (TTT), 12, 13 & 18
Held after Stages 1 & 2
Held after Stage 1

1st Stage 2 Volta a Catalunya
1st Stage 2 Tour de Romandie
1st Stage 1 Tour of California
2nd Clásica de Almería
3rd Coppa Bernocchi
7th Road race, Commonwealth Games

2011 — HTC–Highroad (12)
1st Road race, UCI World Championships
1st Scheldeprijs
1st London–Surrey Cycle Classic
Tour de France

1st Points classification
1st Stages 5, 7, 11, 15 & 21

Giro d'Italia

1st Stage 1 (TTT), 10 & 12
Held after Stage 2

Tour of Britain

1st Stages 1 & 8b

1st Stage 6 Tour of Oman

2012 — Team Sky (15)
1st Overall Ster ZLM Toer
1st Kuurne–Brussels–Kuurne
Tour de France

1st Stages 2, 18 & 20

Giro d'Italia

1st Stages 2, 5 & 13
Held after Stages 2 & 11–19
1st Azzurri d'Italia classification
1st Most combative rider classification

Tour of Britain

1st Stages 3, 4 & 8

1st Stage 2 Tirreno–Adriatico
1st Stage 6 Danmark Rundt
6th Overall Tour of Qatar

1st Stages 3 & 5

2013 — Omega Pharma–Quick-Step (19)
1st Road race, National Championships
1st Overall Tour of Qatar

1st Points classification
1st Stages 3, 4, 5 & 6

Giro d'Italia

1st Points classification
1st Stages 1, 6, 12, 13 & 21
Held after Stage 1
1st Azzurri d'Italia classification
1st Most combative rider classification

Tour de France

1st Stages 5 & 13
Combativity award Stage 13

Tour of Britain

1st Stages 4, 7 & 8

1st Stage 1 Tour de San Luis
1st Stage 1 (TTT) Tirreno–Adriatico
2nd Scheldeprijs
3rd Overall Ster ZLM Toer
6th Overall Driedaagse van West-Vlaanderen
7th Overall Danmark Rundt

1st Stage 6

9th Milan–San Remo
10th Overall Three Days of De Panne

1st Stage 2

2014 — Omega Pharma–Quick-Step (11)
Tour of Turkey

1st Points classification
1st Stages 1, 2, 4 & 8

Tour du Poitou-Charentes

1st Points classification
1st Stages 1 & 2

Tour of California

1st Stages 1 & 8

Tirreno–Adriatico

1st Stages 1 (TTT) & 6

1st Stage 5 Volta ao Algarve
1st Stage 4 Tour de Suisse
5th Milan–San Remo
5th Vattenfall Cyclassics

2015 — Etixx–Quick-Step (14)
1st Overall Dubai Tour

1st Points classification
1st Stages 1 & 4

1st Kuurne–Brussels–Kuurne
1st Clásica de Almería
Tour of California

1st Points classification
1st Stages 1, 2, 5 & 8

Tour of Turkey

1st Points classification
1st Stages 1, 2 & 7

1st Stage 7 Tour de France
1st Stage 7 Tour de San Luis
2nd Road race, National Championships

2016 — Team Dimension Data (10)
1st Overall UCI Asia Tour
1st Overall Tour of Qatar

1st Stage 1

Tour de France

1st Stages 1, 3, 6 & 14
Held after Stage 1
Held after Stages 1, 3 & 6–9

Abu Dhabi Tour

1st Points classification
1st Stages 2 & 4

1st Stage 2 Tour of Croatia
1st Stage 8 Tour of California
2nd Road race, UCI World Championships
2nd Road race, National Championships
2nd Scheldeprijs
6th Overall Giro della Toscana
6th Paris–Tours

2017 – Team Dimension Data (1)
Abu Dhabi Tour

1st Points classification
1st Stage 1

6th Grand Prix d'Isbergues
8th Overall Dubai Tour

2018 – Team Dimension Data (1)
1st Stage 3 Dubai Tour

2021 – Deceuninck–Quick-Step (10)
1st Münsterland Giro
Tour de France

1st Points classification
1st Stages 4, 6, 10 & 13

Tour of Turkey

1st Stages 2, 3, 4 & 8

1st Stage 5 Tour of Belgium
2nd Grote Prijs Jean-Pierre Monseré
2nd Elfstedenronde
3rd Scheldeprijs

2022 – Quick-Step Alpha Vinyl Team (5)
1st Road race, National Championships
1st Milano–Torino
1st Stage 3 Giro d'Italia
1st Stage 2 UAE Tour
1st Stage 2 Tour of Oman
2nd Memorial Rik Van Steenbergen
3rd Heistse Pijl

2023 – Astana Qazaqstan Team (1)
1st Stage 21 Giro d'Italia
3rd Scheldeprijs
9th Overall ZLM Tour

2024 – Astana Qazaqstan Team (3)
1st Stage 5 Tour de France
1st Stage 2 Tour de Hongrie
1st Stage 4 Tour Colombia

==== Classic results timeline ====
Monument	2007	2008	2009	2010	2011	2012	2013	2014	2015	2016	2017	2018	2019	2020	2021	2022	2023	2024
Milan–San Remo	—	—	1	89	52	DNF	9	5	46	110	101	DNF	—	—	—	—	150	—
Tour of Flanders	—	—	—	DNF	110	—	—	—	—	—	—	—	—	DNF	—	—	—	—
Paris–Roubaix	—	—	—	—	DNF	—	—	—	—	30	—	—	—	NH	—	—	—	—
Liège–Bastogne–Liège	Did not contest during his career																	
Giro di Lombardia	Did not contest during his career																	
Classic	2007	2008	2009	2010	2011	2012	2013	2014	2015	2016	2017	2018	2019	2020	2021	2022	2023	2024
Kuurne–Brussels–Kuurne	—	—	—	—	—	1	NH	—	1	—	—	—	—	—	—	—	—	—
Milano–Torino	—	—	—	—	—	—	—	—	—	—	—	—	—	—	—	1	33	DNF
Gent–Wevelgem	—	17	55	—	60	58	18	—	DNF	—	—	—	—	74	—	—	DNS	—
Scheldeprijs	1	1	—	—	1	—	2	—	—	2	—	—	—	143	3	—	3	—
Hamburg Cyclassics	—	—	—	—	—	—	—	5	66	—	—	—	—	NH	NH	—	—	—
Münsterland Giro	—	—	—	—	—	—	—	—	—	—	28	—	—	NH	1	—	—	—
Paris–Tours	—	—	—	—	42	—	—	—	—	6	56	—	DNF	—	—	—	—	—

==== Major road championships results timeline ====
	2005	2006	2007	2008	2009	2010	2011	2012	2013	2014	2015	2016	2017	2018	2019	2020	2021	2022
Olympic Games	Not held			—	Not held			29	Not held			—	Not held				—	NH
World Championships	—	—	DNF	—	—	DNF	1	DNF	DNF	—	—	2	—	—	—	—	DNF	—
National Championships	15	—	—	5	6	—	—	—	1	DNS	2	2	OTL	DNF	22	NH	DNF	1

Legend
—	Did not compete
DNF	Did not finish
OTL	Outside time limit
DNS	Did not start
NH	Not held

==== Grand Tour record ====
	2007	2008	2009	2010	2011	2012	2013	2014	2015	2016	2017	2018	2019	2020	2021	2022	2023	2024
Giro d'Italia	DNE	132	DNF-13	DNE	DNF-13	145	127	DNE	DNE	DNE	DNE	DNE	DNE	DNE	DNE	145	120	DNE
Stages won	—	2	3	—	2	3	5	—	—	—	—	—	—	—	—	1	1	—
Points classification	—	4	—	—	—	2	1	—	—	—	—	—	—	—	—	3	4	—
Tour de France	DNF-8	DNF-14	131	154	130	142	148	DNS-2	142	DNS-17	DNS-5	HD-11	DNE	DNE	139	DNE	DNF-8	141 (Note: Cavendish finished as the lanterne rouge of the race.)
Stages won	0	4	6	5	5	3	2	0	1	4	0	0	—	—	4	—	0	1
Points classification	—	—	2	2	1	4	2	—	4	—	—	—	—	—	1	—	—	56
Vuelta a España	DNE	DNE	DNE	144	DNF-4	DNE	DNE	DNE	DNE	DNE	DNE	DNE	DNE	DNE	DNE	DNE	DNE	DNE
Stages won	—	—	—	3	0	—	—	—	—	—	—	—	—	—	—	—	—	—
Points classification	—	—	—	1	—	—	—	—	—	—	—	—	—	—	—	—	—	—

Legend
1	Winner
2–3	Top three-finish
4–10	Top ten-finish
11–	Other finish
DNE	Did not enter
DNF-x	Did not finish (retired on stage x)
DNS-x	Did not start (not started on stage x)
HD-x	Finished outside time limit (occurred on stage x)
DSQ	Disqualified
N/A	Race/classification not held
NR	Not ranked in this classification

Critériums

2003
1st Individual criterium, Island Games
2004
1st Tour of Britain Support Circuit
2005
1st National Championships
1st Großer Silber–Pils Preis
1st Kleve
2nd Westerwald
2nd Bad Oeynhausen
2006
2nd Sparkassen Giro Bochum (Derny)
2007
2nd Wetteren (Derny)
2008
1st RaboRonde Heerlen
1st Ronde van Made
1st Nacht van Peer
1st Herentals
2nd Aalst
3rd Profronde van Stiphout
2009
1st Draai van de Kaai
1st Profronde van Almelo
1st Aalst
1st Nacht van Peer
1st Sparkassen Giro Bochum (Derny)
1st Antwerpen (Derny)
2010
1st Welser Sparkassen Innenstadt
1st Linz
2011
1st Profronde van Stiphout
1st Profronde van Wateringen
1st Wolvertem (Eddy Merckx)
1st RaboRonde Heerlen
2012
1st Ninove
1st Lacq–Audejos
1st Profronde van Surhuisterveen
1st Oslo
2nd Bavikhove
2017
1st Saitama Criterium
2021
1st Criterium Roeselare
2023
2nd Tour de France Singapore
2024
1st Tour de France Singapore

=== Track ===
2001
National Junior Championships

2nd Points race
3rd Scratch

2003
National Junior Championships

1st Kilo
2nd Scratch
2nd Sprint

2004
National Championships

1st Team pursuit
2nd Madison (with Ed Clancy)

Madison, UIV Talent Cup

1st Bremen (with Geraint Thomas)
1st Munich (with Matt Brammeier)

1st Madison, Revolution Series (with Ed Clancy)
2005
1st Madison, UCI World Championships (with Rob Hayles)
1st Points race, UEC European Championships
National Championships

1st Team pursuit
2nd Scratch

UCI World Cup Classics

2nd Team pursuit, Sydney
2nd Team pursuit, Manchester
3rd Madison, Sydney (with Tom White)
3rd Madison, Manchester (with Rob Hayles)

2006
1st Scratch, Commonwealth Games
3rd Madison, UCI World Cup Classics, Sydney (with Geraint Thomas)
2007
1st Scratch, Revolution Series 16
2nd Madison, UCI World Cup Classics, Beijing (with Bradley Wiggins)
2008
1st Madison, UCI World Championships (with Bradley Wiggins)
1st Madison, National Championships (with Peter Kennaugh)
2011
1st Scratch, Revolution Series 34
2014
1st Six Days of Zürich (with Iljo Keisse)
2nd Six Days of Ghent (with Iljo Keisse)
2015
1st Madison, Revolution Series, Derby (with Bradley Wiggins)
2016
1st Madison, UCI World Championships (with Bradley Wiggins)
1st Six Days of Ghent (with Bradley Wiggins)
1st Omnium, Panevėžys Cup
2nd Omnium, Olympic Games
2nd Six Days of London (with Bradley Wiggins)
2017
2nd Six Days of London (with Peter Kennaugh)
2019
2nd Six Days of London (with Owain Doull)

==== Major track championships results timeline ====
Event		2004	2005	2006	2007	2008	2009	2010	2011	2012	2013	2014	2015	2016
Olympic Games	Madison	—	Not held			9	Not held			—	Not held			—
Olympic Games	Omnium	DNE	Not held			DNE	Not held			—	Not held			2
World Championships	Madison	—	1	4	—	1	6	—	—	—	—	—	—	1
World Championships	Omnium	Did not exist			—	—	—	—	—	—	—	—	—	6
World Championships	Points race	—	—	—	—	14	—	—	—	—	—	—	—	—
World Championships	Scratch	—	4	DNF	—	—	7	—	—	—	—	—	—	—
National Championships	Madison	2	—	—	—	1	—	—	—	—	—	—	—	—
National Championships	Scratch	—	2	—	—	—	—	—	—	—	—	—	—	—
National Championships	Team pursuit	1	1	—	—	—	—	—	—	—	—	—	—	—

== Awards and honours ==
Cavendish won the International Flandrien of the Year award twice, in 2009 and 2011.

He was the winner of the 2011 BBC Sports Personality of the Year Award, becoming the third cyclist (at the time) to win the award, after Tom Simpson and Chris Hoy. He also received the BBC Sports Personality of the Year Lifetime Achievement Award in 2024.

For his services to British cycling, Cavendish was appointed as an MBE in the 2011 Birthday Honours, and was knighted in the 2024 Birthday Honours.
