= Galanis =

Galanis is a surname. Notable people with the surname include:

- Demetrios Galanis (1879–1966), Greek artist
- Dimitrios Galanis (born 1971), Greek basketball coach
- James Galanis, football manager
- John Peter Galanis (born 1943), American financier and convicted fraudster
- Theodoros Galanis (born 1980), Greek footballer
- Vasilios Galanis (born 1987), Greek footballer
- Ward Galanis, American politician

== See also ==
- Galani
