= 2007 Australian Lacrosse League season =

Results and statistics for the Australian Lacrosse League season of 2007.

== Game 22 ==
Saturday, 20 October 2007, Melbourne, Victoria

	1	2	3	4	OT1	OT2	FINAL
Vic	4	1	2	0	0	1	8
SA	1	2	2	2	0	0	7

Goalscorers:

- Vic: Nick LeGuen 4–1, Jake Egan 2, Blair Pepperell 2, Clinton Lander 0–1, John Tokarua 0–1.
- SA: Anson Carter 3, Leigh Perham 1–3, Wes Green 1, Stefan Guerin 1, Brock Pettigrove 1.

== Game 23 ==
Sunday, 21 October 2007, Melbourne, Victoria

	1	2	3	4	OT1	OT2	FINAL
Vic	1	3	2	4	1	1	12
SA	3	2	4	1	0	0	10

Goalscorers:

- Vic: Nick LeGuen 3–2, Blair Pepperell 2, Andrew Whitbourn 2, Clinton Lander 1–2, Sam Bullock 1-1, Jake Egan 1, Adam Townley 1, Ben Waite 1, Aaron Onofretchook 0–2, Alistair Gloutnay 0–1.
- SA: Kieren Lennox 2, Will Pickett 2, Leigh Perham 1–3, Chris Averay 1-1, Anson Carter 1-1, Ryan Gaspari 1, Stefan Guerin 1, Brock Pettigrove 1.

== Game 24 ==
Friday, 26 October 2007, Adelaide, South Australia

	1	2	3	4	FINAL
SA	5	3	2	1	11
WA	2	4	3	5	14

Goalscorers:

- SA: Chris Averay 2-2, Anson Carter 2–1, Leigh Perham 1-1, Stefan Guerin 1, Kieren Lennox 1, Jason MacKinnon 1, Brock Pettigrove 1, Will Pickett 1, Ryan Stone 1.
- WA: Wayne Curran 6, Kim Delfs 3–1, Jesse Stack 1–2, Jason Battaglia 1, Blair Coggan 1, Brad Goddard 1, James Watson-Galbraith 1, Mark Whiteman 0–1.

== Game 25 ==
Saturday, 27 October 2007, Adelaide, South Australia

	1	2	3	4	FINAL
SA	3	2	2	2	9
WA	2	6	2	5	15

Goalscorers:

- SA: Anson Carter 4, Leigh Perham 3, Chris Averay 1–2, Ryan Gaspari 1, Jack Woodford 0–1.
- WA: Kim Delfs 4–3, Jesse Stack 4–1, Brad Goddard 3, Wayne Curran 2–1, Adam Delfs 1, Ben Tippett 1, James Watson-Galbraith 0–2, Mark Whiteman 0–1.

== Game 26 ==
Friday, 2 November 2007, Perth, Western Australia

	1	2	3	4	FINAL
WA	1	0	0	2	3
Vic	0	4	5	2	11

Goalscorers:

- WA: Wayne Curran 2, Brad Goddard 1, Jesse Stack 0–1.
- Vic: Sam Bullock 3, Ben Waite 3, Adam Townley 2, Jake Egan 1, Nick LeGuen 1, Aaron Onofretchook 1, Clinton Lander 0–2, Blair Pepperell 0–2.

== Game 27 ==
Saturday, 3 November 2007, Perth, Western Australia

	1	2	3	4	FINAL
WA	1	3	3	0	7
Vic	5	0	3	5	13

Goalscorers:

- WA: Wayne Curran 2, Kim Delfs 2, Jason Battaglia 1, Ian Berry 1, James Watson-Galbraith 1, Sam Ramsay 0–1.
- Vic: Adam Townley 4, Ben Waite 3, Nick LeGuen 2, Jake Egan 1, James Lawerson 1, Aaron Onofretchook 1, Andrew Whitbourn 1, Clinton Lander 0–1, Blair Pepperell 0–1.

== ALL Table 2007 ==
Table after completion of round-robin tournament

	P	W	L	F	A	Pts
Vic	4	4	0	44	27	8
WA	4	2	2	39	44	4
SA	4	0	4	37	49	0

== FINAL (Game 28) ==
Saturday, 10 November 2007, Melbourne, Victoria

	1	2	3	4	FINAL
Vic	3	4	0	5	12
WA	1	0	2	0	3

Goalscorers:

- Vic: Adam Townley 4, Nick LeGuen 2-2, Clinton Lander 2–1, Aaron Onofretchook 1-1, Andrew Whitbourn 1-1, Jake Egan 1, Ben Waite 1, Blair Pepperell 0–1.
- WA: Wayne Curran 1, Kim Delfs 1, James Watson-Galbraith 1, Mark Whiteman 0–1.

== All-Stars ==
- ALL 2007 Champions (Garland McHarg Trophy): Victoria
- ALL 2007 Most Valuable Player (Hobbs Perpetual Trophy): Leigh Perham (SA)
- ALL 2007 All-Stars: Sam Bullock, Nick LeGuen, Cameron Shepherd, Chris Tillotson, John Tokarua, Ben Waite (Vic), Wayne Curran, Kim Delfs, Brad Goddard, Tim Kennedy, Gavin Leavy (WA), Anson Carter, Leigh Perham (SA). Coach: Murray Keen (Vic). Referee: Jason Lawrence.

== See also ==
- Australian Lacrosse League
- Lacrosse in Australia
