= 2004 Australian Lacrosse League season =

Results and statistics for the Australian Lacrosse League season of 2004, the inaugural season for the ALL.

== Game 1 ==
Saturday, 23 October 2004, Melbourne, Victoria

	1	2	3	4	FINAL
Vic	5	3	2	4	14
WA	4	2	2	2	10

Goalscorers:

- Vic: D Pusvacietis 3–1, D Stiglich 3–1, W Henderson 2-2, D Nicholas 2–1, R Stark 2, R Garnsworthy 1, M Sevior 1.
- WA: C Hayes 2, J Stack 2, L Blackie 1, W Curran 1, K Gillespie 1, N Rainey 1, T Roost 1, A Sear 1, D Whiteman 0–3.

== Game 2 ==
Sunday, 24 October 2004, Melbourne, Victoria

	1	2	3	4	FINAL
Vic	3	3	4	0	10
WA	3	1	2	2	8

Goalscorers:

- Vic: D Stiglich 3, W Henderson 2–1, D Nicholas 2, D Pusvacietis 1–3, D Arnell 1, J Brammell 1, R Stark 0–1.
- WA: D Whiteman 3–1, C Hayes 1-1, D Spreadborough 1-1, N Rainey 1, T Roost 1, J Stack 1, L Blackie 0–1, B Goddard 0–1.

== Game 3 ==
Saturday, 30 October 2004, Adelaide, South Australia

	1	2	3	4	FINAL
SA	3	5	2	3	13
Vic	3	2	4	2	11

Goalscorers:

- SA: B Howe 4, M Mangan 3, L Perham 2, A Carter 1, A Feleppa 1, S Gilbert 1, N Wapper 1.
- Vic: D Stiglich 3, D Arnell 2, D Pusvacietis 2, J Ardossi 1, M Sevoir 1, knocked-in 2.

== Game 4 ==
Sunday, 31 October 2004, Adelaide, South Australia

	1	2	3	4	FINAL
SA	0	4	3	3	10
Vic	3	5	1	5	14

Goalscorers:

- SA: L Perham 3–1, A Feleppa 2-2, B Howe 2, N Wapper 2, M Mangan 1–4, A Carter 0–1, R Stone 0–1.
- Vic: D Nicholas 3–1, D Stiglich 3–1, J Joy 3, D Pusvacietis 1–3, A Lawman 1-1, T Fry 1, W Henderson 1, M Sevoir 1, N Le Guen 0–1.

== Game 5 ==
Saturday, 6 November 2004, Perth, Western Australia

	1	2	3	4	FINAL
WA	1	0	5	3	9
SA	1	3	1	2	7

Goalscorers:

- WA: A Sear 3, A Ettridge 2, D Spreadborough 1-1, G Allen 1, A Brown 1, N Rainey 1.
- SA: N Wapper 2, S Robb 1–2, L Perham 1-1, A Feleppa 1, S Gilbert 1, M Mangan 1.

== Game 6 ==
Sunday, 7 November 2004, Perth, Western Australia

	1	2	3	4	FINAL
WA	1	2	4	6	13
SA	3	4	2	2	11

Goalscorers:

- WA: D Whiteman 6, R Brown 2, A Sear 2, A Ettridge 1, C Hayes 1, D Spreadborough 1.
- SA: B Howe 4, S Gilbert 2, L Perham 2, A Carter 1, M Mangan 1, J Pangrazio 1.

== ALL Table 2004 ==
Table after completion of round-robin tournament

	P	W	L	F	A	Pts
Vic	4	3	1	49	41	6
WA	4	2	2	40	42	4
SA	4	1	3	41	47	2

== FINAL (Game 7) ==
Saturday, 13 November 2004, Melbourne, Victoria

	1	2	3	4	FINAL
Vic	1	6	4	5	16
WA	3	1	2	1	7

Goalscorers:

- Vic: D Nicholas 5–1, D Pusvacietis 3–2, J Ardossi 2–1, A Lawman 2, D Stiglich 1–2, D Arnall 1, J Joy 1, J Tokarua 1, M Sevoir 0–1.
- WA: A Sear 3, D Whiteman 2, D Spreadborough 2, N Rainey 0–2, G Morley 0–1.

== All-Stars ==
- ALL 2004 Champions: Victoria
- ALL 2004 Most Valuable Player: Russell Brown (WA)
- ALL 2004 All-Stars: Darren Nicholas, Daniel Pusvacietis, John Tokarua, Scott Garnsworthy, Cameron Shepherd, Daniel Stiglich (Vic), Russell Brown, David Whiteman, Nathan Rainey, Adam Sear (WA), Leigh Perham, Brett Howe, Mark Mangan (SA). Coach: Duncan McKenzie (Vic). Referee: Rolf Kraus

== See also ==
- Lacrosse
- Australian Lacrosse League
- Lacrosse in Australia
