= 2005 Australian Lacrosse League season =

These are the results and statistics for the Australian Lacrosse League season of 2005.

== Game 8 ==
Friday, 21 October 2005, Adelaide, South Australia

| | 1 | 2 | 3 | 4 | FINAL |
|---|---|---|---|---|---|
| SA | 2 | 6 | 1 | 3 | 12 |
| WA | 4 | 2 | 2 | 5 | 13 |

Goalscorers:

- SA: A Lawman 5, L Perham 3–2, M Mangan 2, S Connolly 1, S Robb 1, P Inge 0–2, A Feleppa 0–1, S Gilbert 0–1, R Stone 0–1.
- WA: D Whiteman 3, R Brown 2–1, K Delfs 2–1, A Sear 2–1, W Curran 2, L Blackie 1-1, J Stack 1, G Allan 0–1.

== Game 9 ==
Saturday, 22 October 2005, Adelaide, South Australia

| | 1 | 2 | 3 | 4 | FINAL |
|---|---|---|---|---|---|
| SA | 1 | 2 | 2 | 4 | 9 |
| WA | 3 | 3 | 4 | 6 | 16 |

Goalscorers:

- SA: A Lawman 3, M Mangan 3, L Perham 2–1, C Averay 1-1, S Robb 0–2, J Casagrande 0–1.
- WA: G Allan 3–1, D Whiteman 3, R Brown 2–1, K Delfs 2–1, A Sear 2, J Stack 1-1, L Blackie 1, W Curran 1, knocked-in 1.

== Game 10 ==
Saturday, 29 October 2005, Perth, Western Australia

| | 1 | 2 | 3 | 4 | FINAL |
|---|---|---|---|---|---|
| WA | 1 | 0 | 2 | 3 | 6 |
| Vic | 4 | 2 | 1 | 3 | 10 |

Goalscorers:

- WA: W Curran 2, A Sear 2, K Gillespie 1, D Whiteman 1, B Smith 0–1.
- Vic: J Buchanan 3–1, D Nicholas 3, T Fry 1, B Ross 1, R Stark 1, D Stiglich 1, D Pusvacietis 0–1, M Sevior 0–1.

== Game 11 ==
Sunday, 30 October 2005, Perth, Western Australia

| | 1 | 2 | 3 | 4 | FINAL |
|---|---|---|---|---|---|
| WA | 3 | 2 | 0 | 2 | 7 |
| Vic | 2 | 7 | 4 | 5 | 18 |

Goalscorers:

- WA: D Whiteman 2–1, J Stack 1-1, G Allan 1, R Brown 1, K Gillespie 1, A Sear 1, L Blackie 0–1.
- Vic: B Ross 5–3, D Pusvacietis 3-3, J Buchanan 2-2, D Stiglich 2-2, R Stark 2, N Stiglich 2, D Nicholas 1–2, R Garnsworthy 1, M McInerney 0–1.

== Game 12 ==
Friday, 4 November 2005, Melbourne, Victoria

| | 1 | 2 | 3 | 4 | FINAL |
|---|---|---|---|---|---|
| Vic | 3 | 2 | 1 | 3 | 9 |
| SA | 1 | 0 | 3 | 2 | 6 |

Goalscorers:

- Vic: B Ross 2, M Sevior 2, R Stark 2, D Pusvacietis 1–2, D Stiglich 1, N Stiglich 1, J Ardossi 0–1.
- SA: A Feleppa 3, S Robb 1-1, A Lawman 1, M Mangan 1, S Gilbert 0–1.

== Game 13 ==
Saturday, 5 November 2005, Melbourne, Victoria

| | 1 | 2 | 3 | 4 | FINAL |
|---|---|---|---|---|---|
| Vic | 4 | 5 | 1 | 3 | 13 |
| SA | 1 | 4 | 1 | 2 | 8 |

Goalscorers:

- Vic: J Buchanan 3, J Ardossi 2–1, R Stark 2–1, N Stiglich 2–1, T Fry 2, D Arnell 1, D Pusvacietis 1, M McInerney 0–1.
- SA: M Mangan 2–1, S Robb 2, S Connolly 2, L Perham 1-1, A Carter 1, A Feleppa 0–1.

== ALL Table 2005 ==
Table after completion of round-robin tournament

| | P | W | L | F | A | Pts |
|---|---|---|---|---|---|---|
| Vic | 4 | 4 | 0 | 50 | 27 | 8 |
| WA | 4 | 2 | 2 | 42 | 49 | 4 |
| SA | 4 | 0 | 4 | 35 | 51 | 0 |

== FINAL (Game 14) ==
Friday, 11 November 2005, Adelaide, South Australia

| | 1 | 2 | 3 | 4 | FINAL |
|---|---|---|---|---|---|
| Vic | 5 | 4 | 2 | 6 | 17 |
| WA | 1 | 1 | 2 | 2 | 6 |

Goalscorers:

- Vic: R Stark 3, D Stiglich 3, J Buchanan 2-2, R Garnsworthy 2–1, D Pusvacietis 2–1, J Ardossi 2, D Nicholas 1–3, T Fry 1, J Tokarua 1, N Stiglich 0–2.
- WA: W Curran 2, R Brown 1–2, G Allan 1, B Smith 1, D Whiteman 1.

== All-Stars ==
- ALL 2005 Champions: Victoria
- ALL 2005 Most Valuable Player: Peter Inge (SA)
- ALL 2005 All-Stars: Jamie Buchanan, Sam Marquard, Brad Ross, Robbie Stark, Daniel Stiglich, John Tokarua (Vic), Warren Brown, Wayne Curran, Gavin Leavy, Glenn Morley, David Whiteman (WA), Peter Inge (SA). Coach: David Joy (Vic). Referee: ...

== See also ==
- Lacrosse
- Australian Lacrosse League
- Lacrosse in Australia
