= 2006 Australian Lacrosse League season =

Results and statistics for the Australian Lacrosse League season of 2006.

== Game 15 ==
Friday, 20 October 2006, Perth, Western Australia

| | 1 | 2 | 3 | 4 | FINAL |
|---|---|---|---|---|---|
| WA | 6 | 2 | 5 | 1 | 14 |
| SA | 0 | 0 | 1 | 3 | 4 |

Goalscorers:

- WA: Nathan Rainey 4-1, Adam Sear 4-1, Alex Brown 2-1, Travis Roost 2, Jason Battaglia 1, Adam Delfs 1, Jesse Stack 0-1.
- SA: Ryan Gaspari 2-1, Anson Carter 2.

== Game 16 ==
Saturday, 21 October 2006, Perth, Western Australia

| | 1 | 2 | 3 | 4 | FINAL |
|---|---|---|---|---|---|
| WA | 6 | 3 | 5 | 2 | 16 |
| SA | 2 | 2 | 1 | 3 | 8 |

Goalscorers:

- WA: Alex Brown 4-1, Adam Delfs 3, Adam Sear 3, Nathan Rainey 2, Russell Brown 1-1, Jason Battaglia 1, Travis Roost 1, Jesse Stack 1, Glen Morley 0-1, James Watson-Galbraith 0-1.
- SA: Anson Carter 5, Shane Gilbert 1, Brendan Twiggs 1, Nigel Wapper 1.

== Game 17 ==
Friday, 27 October 2006, Melbourne, Victoria

| | 1 | 2 | 3 | 4 | FINAL |
|---|---|---|---|---|---|
| Vic | 1 | 2 | 2 | 3 | 8 |
| WA | 2 | 1 | 2 | 1 | 6 |

Goalscorers:

- Vic: Ben Newman 2-1, Robbie Stark 2, Damian Arnell 1, Clinton Lander 1, Aaron Onafretchook 1, Tristan Tomasino 1, Marty Hyde 0-1.
- WA: Brad Goddard 2-1, Nathan Roost 2, Adam Sear 1, Jesse Stack 1, Russell Brown 0-1, Adam Delfs 0-1, James Watson-Galbraith 0-1.

== Game 18 ==
Saturday, 28 October 2006, Melbourne, Victoria

| | 1 | 2 | 3 | 4 | FINAL |
|---|---|---|---|---|---|
| Vic | 5 | 2 | 1 | 3 | 11 |
| WA | 0 | 2 | 3 | 1 | 6 |

Goalscorers:

- Vic: Adam Townley 3, Aaron Onafretchook 2-1, Clinton Lander 2, Robert Chamberlain 1-5, Marty Hyde 1-1, Robbie Stark 1-1, Josh Naughton 1.
- WA: Adam Sear 3, Russell Brown 1-1, Alex Brown 1, Adam Delfs 1, Brad Goddard 0-1.

== Game 19 ==
Friday, 3 November 2006, Adelaide, South Australia

| | 1 | 2 | 3 | 4 | FINAL |
|---|---|---|---|---|---|
| SA | 1 | 3 | 1 | 2 | 7 |
| Vic | 2 | 2 | 1 | 6 | 11 |

Goalscorers:

- SA: Anson Carter 2, Nigel Wapper 2, Ryan Gaspari 1-1, Shane Gilbert 1, Philip McConnell 0-1, knocked-in 1.
- Vic: Robert Chamberlain 2-1, Adam Townley 2-1, Clinton Lander 2, Robbie Stark 1-1, Marty Hyde 1, Josh Naughton 1, Ben Newman 1, Damian Arnall 0-1, Michael Rodrigues 0-1, knocked-in 1.

== Game 20 ==
Saturday, 4 November 2006, Adelaide, South Australia

| | 1 | 2 | 3 | 4 | FINAL |
|---|---|---|---|---|---|
| SA | 1 | 1 | 1 | 1 | 4 |
| Vic | 6 | 4 | 7 | 4 | 21 |

Goalscorers:

- SA: Anson Carter 3, Nigel Wapper 1-1.
- Vic: Robbie Stark 5-1, Josh Naughton 5, Ben Newman 2-1, Adam Townley 2, Clinton Lander 1-3, Marty Hyde 1-2, Aaron Onafretchook 1-2, Tristan Tomasino 1-1, Damian Arnall 1, Michael Rodrigues 1, Chris Welsh 1.

== ALL Table 2006 ==
Table after completion of round-robin tournament

| | P | W | L | F | A | Pts |
|---|---|---|---|---|---|---|
| Vic | 4 | 4 | 0 | 51 | 23 | 8 |
| WA | 4 | 2 | 2 | 42 | 31 | 4 |
| SA | 4 | 0 | 4 | 23 | 62 | 0 |

== FINAL (Game 21) ==
Saturday, 11 November 2006, Perth, Western Australia

| | 1 | 2 | 3 | 4 | FINAL |
|---|---|---|---|---|---|
| Vic | 1 | 4 | 2 | 0 | 7 |
| WA | 4 | 2 | 3 | 5 | 14 |

Goalscorers:

- Vic: Ben Newman 2-1, Robert Chamberlain 2, Robbie Stark 1-1, Marty Hyde 1, Adam Townley 1, Clinton Lander 0-2.
- WA: Adam Sear 5, Nathan Roost 2-1, Alex Brown 1-2, Jason Battaglia 1, Russell Brown 1, Brad Goddard 1, Nathan Rainey 1, Jesse Stack 1, Ben Tippett 1.

== All-Stars ==
- ALL 2006 Champions: Western Australia
- ALL 2006 Most Valuable Player: Robbie Stark (Vic)
- ALL 2006 All-Stars: Alex Brown, Warren Brown, Gavin Leavy, Travis Roost, Adam Sear (WA), Marty Hyde, Keith Nyberg, Cameron Shepherd, Robbie Stark, Adam Townley (Vic), Anson Carter, Anthony Munro, Brendan Twiggs (SA). Coach: Travis Roost (WA). Referee: Don Lovett (Vic)

== See also ==
- Australian Lacrosse League
- Lacrosse in Australia
