= Christian Grasmann =

German cyclist (born 1981)

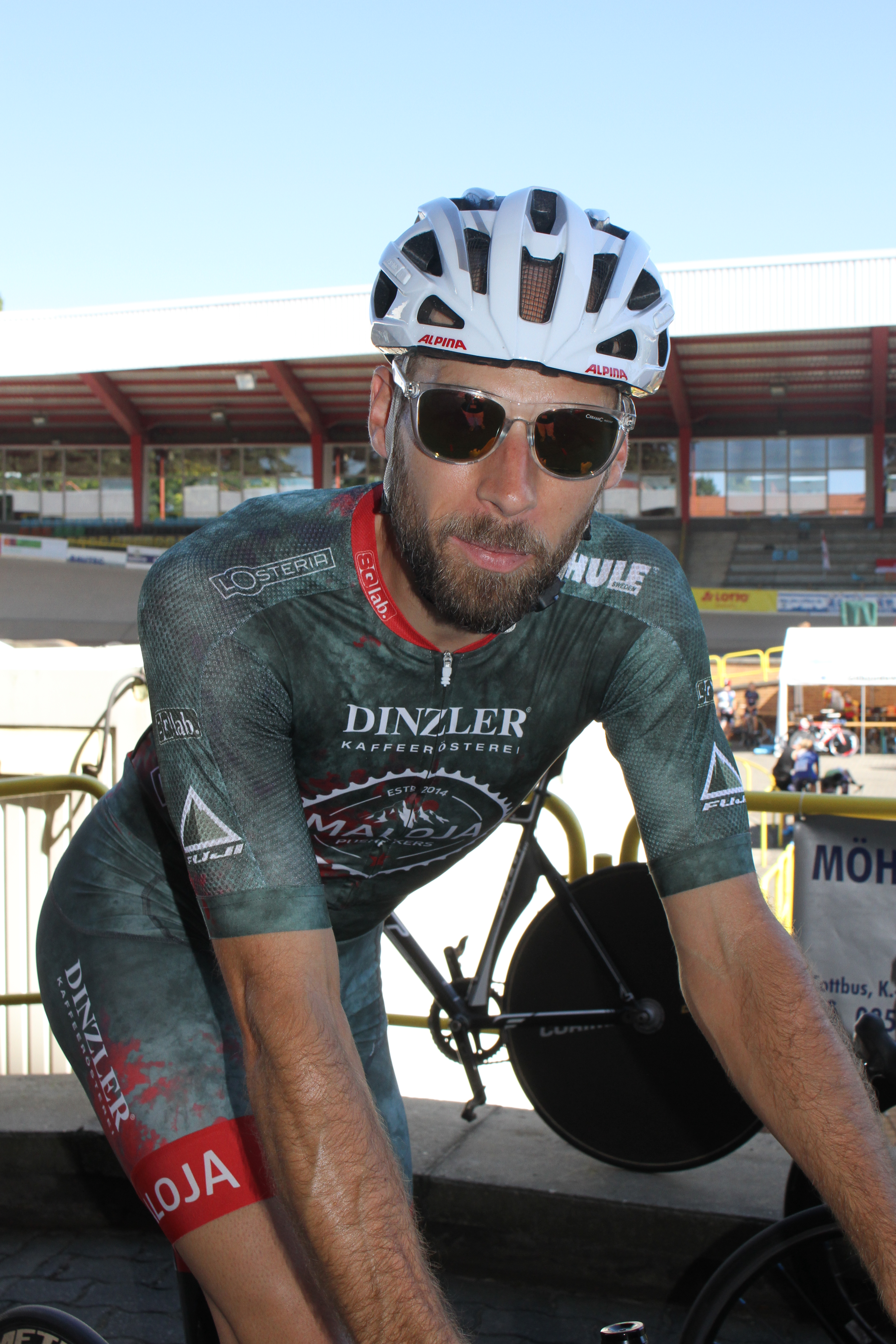
- Grasmann in 2016

Personal information
- Full name: Christian Grasmann
- Born: 16 March 1981 (age 45) Munich, West Germany

Cycling career
- Sport: Cycling
- Current team: Maloja Pushbikers
- Disciplines: Road; Track
- Role: Rider (retired); Team manager

Amateur teams
- 2004–2006: RSV Götting-Bruckmühl
- 2007: SC Wörnsmühl
- 2008: activity-racing-team
- 2008–2017: RSV Irschenberg
- 2011–2013: Rudy Project Racing Team
- 2014–2017: Maloja Pushbikers
- 2019: RSV Irschenberg

Professional teams
- 2007: Team Sparkasse
- 2018–2019: WSA–Pushbikers

Managerial team
- 2020–: Maloja Pushbikers

Christian Grasmann (born 16 March 1981) is a German former racing cyclist, who currently works as the team manager of UCI Continental team Maloja Pushbikers. He rode for WSA–Pushbikers in the men's team time trial event at the 2018 UCI Road World Championships.

== Major results ==
2009
2nd Six Days of Zürich (with Leif Lampater)
3rd Six Days of Munich (with Leif Lampater)
2010
3rd Six Days of Bremen (with Leif Lampater)
6th Grand Prix Dobrich I
2015
2nd Six Days of Copenhagen (with Jesper Mørkøv)
2016
1st Six Days of Bremen (with Kenny De Ketele)
2nd Six Days of Rotterdam (with Morgan Kneisky)
2017
1st Six Days of Rotterdam (with Roger Kluge)
