= Budapest Blax Lacrosse =

The Budapest Blax Lacrosse Egyesület is the first Hungarian lacrosse team.

== History ==
In February 2008, a couple of enthusiastic young people led by Ferenc Sződy started to work on spreading the sport of lacrosse in Hungary. The Budapest Blax were founded in March 2008, and were actively practising in April. In May, European Lacrosse Federation president Peter J. Mundy traveled to Budapest to hold a clinic. The team's size grew considerably over the summer months. By November, the team was able to host a friendly match against Bratislava Bats from Bratislava, Slovakia. The Slovak club was much more experienced and won the game easily.

In 2009, the club continued to expand. In March of that year, the Blax traveled to Bratislava for a tournament, where they faced off against the Bratislava Bats once again, as well as the Vienna Cherokees. The Blax finished the tournament in third place.

Despite having little experience, the Blax maintained a good relationship with the Austrian Lacrosse Federation and received permission to participate in the Austrian Lacrosse League in 2009. The team played throughout the summer, and had the opportunity to host a playoff game in September. The Blax finished their inaugural season in 6th place. This relatively successful first season resulted in the team being offered a permanent spot in the Australian Lacrosse League.

In January 2010, Budapest hosted the New Years Cup, hosting teams from across Europe including the Graz Gladiators (Austria), the Vienna White Coats (Austria), and the Ljubljana Dragons (Slovenia).

== Data ==
=== Date of foundation ===
16 March 2008

=== Board ===
- Sződy, Ferenc - President
- Gazsó, Tamás - Vice-president
- Elekes, Rita - Women's lacrosse
- Urbán, Dávid - Marketing/PR
- Kovács, Attila - Youth training

== Results ==
- 2008: Friendly game defeat
- 2009:

* Friendly tournament in Bratislava: 3rd place
* Austrian Lacrosse League: 6th place

- 2010:

* New Years Cup Budapest: 4th place
* Austrian Lacrosse League: 5th place

== See also ==
- Federation of International Lacrosse
- History of lacrosse
- Sport in Budapest
- Sport in Hungary
- 2016 European Lacrosse Championship
