= Galani =

Galani is a surname. Notable people with the surname include:

- Arianthe Galani (born 1940), actress
- Dimitra Galani (born 1952), Greek singer and composer

== See also ==
- Angel wings, type of pastry
- Galani, Xanthi, town in Greece
- Galanis, surname
