= 2008 UCI Track Cycling World Championships – Men's omnium =

Men's omnium at the 2008 UCI Track Cycling World Championships
- Venue: Manchester Velodrome, Manchester
- Date: 30 March 2008

The Men's sprint event of the 2008 UCI Track Cycling World Championships was held on 30 March 2008.

== Results ==
=== 200 m time trial ===
| Rank | Name | Nation | Time |
|---|---|---|---|
| 1 | Ghislain Boiron | France | 10.481 |
| 2 | Travis Smith | Canada | 10.489 |
| 3 | Hayden Godfrey | New Zealand | 10.569 |
| 4 | Vasilios Galanis | Greece | 10.664 |
| 5 | Bobby Lea | United States | 10.688 |
| 6 | Alois Kaňkovský | Czech Republic | 10.701 |
| 7 | Steven Burke | Great Britain | 10.854 |
| 8 | Leigh Howard | Australia | 10.857 |
| 9 | Gianpaolo Biolo | Italy | 10.926 |
| 10 | Robert Bartko | Germany | 10.937 |
| 11 | Tim Mertens | Belgium | 10.944 |
| 12 | Robert Slippens | Netherlands | 11.132 |
| 13 | Aliaksandr Lisouski | Belarus | 11.171 |
| 14 | Unai Elorriaga Zubiaur | Spain | 11.213 |
| 15 | Reona Sumi | Japan | 11.354 |
| 16 | Walter Fernando Pérez | Argentina | 11.376 |
| 17 | Evgeny Kovalev | Russia | 11.413 |
| 18 | Roman Kononenko | Ukraine | 11.441 |

=== Scratch ===
| Rank | Name | Nation |
|---|---|---|
| 1 | Hayden Godfrey | New Zealand |
| 2 | Leigh Howard | Australia |
| 3 | Walter Fernando Pérez | Argentina |
| 4 | Robert Bartko | Germany |
| 5 | Tim Mertens | Belgium |
| 6 | Gianpaolo Biolo | Italy |
| 7 | Aliaksandr Lisouski | Belarus |
| 8 | Bobby Lea | United States |
| 9 | Alois Kaňkovský | Czech Republic |
| 10 | Ghislain Boiron | France |
| 11 | Unai Elorriaga Zubiaur | Spain |
| 12 | Travis Smith | Canada |
| 13 | Vasilios Galanis | Greece |
| 14 | Steven Burke | Great Britain |
| 15 | Robert Slippens | Netherlands |
| 16 | Roman Kononenko | Ukraine |
| 17 | Evgeny Kovalev | Russia |
| 18 | Reona Sumi | Japan |

=== Individual pursuit ===
| Rank | Name | Nation | Time |
|---|---|---|---|
| 1 | Robert Bartko | Germany | 3:17.078 |
| 2 | Aliaksandr Lisouski | Belarus | 3:17.464 |
| 3 | Leigh Howard | Australia | 3:18.080 |
| 4 | Hayden Godfrey | New Zealand | 3:18.248 |
| 5 | Robert Slippens | Netherlands | 3:19.355 |
| 6 | Bobby Lea | United States | 3:20.123 |
| 7 | Tim Mertens | Belgium | 3:21.410 |
| 8 | Alois Kaňkovský | Czech Republic | 3:22.184 |
| 9 | Roman Kononenko | Ukraine | 3:23.263 |
| 10 | Steven Burke | Great Britain | 3:23.439 |
| 11 | Gianpaolo Biolo | Italy | 3:24.000 |
| 12 | Walter Fernando Pérez | Argentina | 3:25.365 |
| 13 | Unai Elorriaga Zubiaur | Spain | 3:25.729 |
| 14 | Evgeny Kovalev | Russia | 3:26.880 |
| 15 | Reona Sumi | Japan | 3:29.598 |
| 16 | Ghislain Boiron | France | 3:30.088 |
| 17 | Travis Smith | Canada | 3:34.299 |

=== Points race ===
| Rank | Name | Nation | Points | Laps down |
|---|---|---|---|---|
| 1 | Roman Kononenko | Ukraine | 11 | |
| 2 | Aliaksandr Lisouski | Belarus | 9 | |
| 3 | Evgeny Kovalev | Russia | 8 | |
| 4 | Tim Mertens | Belgium | 8 | |
| 5 | Walter Fernando Pérez | Argentina | 7 | |
| 6 | Steven Burke | Great Britain | 6 | |
| 7 | Hayden Godfrey | New Zealand | 5 | |
| 8 | Gianpaolo Biolo | Italy | 3 | |
| 9 | Robert Slippens | Netherlands | 3 | |
| 10 | Alois Kaňkovský | Czech Republic | 3 | |
| 11 | Reona Sumi | Japan | 2 | |
| 12 | Unai Elorriaga Zubiaur | Spain | 0 | |
| 13 | Leigh Howard | Australia | 0 | |
| 14 | Robert Bartko | Germany | 0 | |
| 15 | Bobby Lea | United States | 0 | |
| 16 | Ghislain Boiron | France | -20 | 1 |
| 17 | Travis Smith | Canada | -40 | 2 |
| 18 | Vasileios Galanis | Greece | -40 | 2 |

=== 1 km time trial ===
| Rank | Name | Nation | 250 m | 500 m | 750 m | Time | Speed (km/h) |
|---|---|---|---|---|---|---|---|
| 1 | Steven Burke | United Kingdom | 19.913 (6) | 33.880 (3) | 48.134 (2) | 01:03.1 | 57.07 |
| 2 | Alois Kaňkovský | Czech Republic | 19.347 (2) | 33.489 (2) | 48.042 (1) | 01:03.4 | 56.775 |
| 3 | Leigh Howard | Australia | 19.533 (3) | 33.974 (4) | 48.594 (3) | 01:03.8 | 56.444 |
| 4 | Hayden Godfrey | New Zealand | 19.536 (4) | 34.022 (5) | 48.710 (5) | 01:03.9 | 56.295 |
| 5 | Bobby Lea | United States | 20.355 (9) | 34.693 (7) | 49.275 (7) | 01:04.6 | 55.718 |
| 6 | Ghislain Boiron | France | 19.828 (5) | 34.153 (6) | 49.127 (6) | 01:04.8 | 55.555 |
| 7 | Travis Smith | Canada | 19.077 (1) | 33.417 (1) | 48.642 (4) | 01:04.9 | 55.479 |
| 8 | Robert Bartko | Germany | 20.448 (10) | 35.019 (9) | 49.747 (9) | 01:05.0 | 55.404 |
| 9 | Gianpaolo Biolo | Italy | 20.279 (7) | 34.913 (8) | 49.687 (8) | 01:05.2 | 55.189 |
| 10 | Robert Slippens | Netherlands | 20.582 (11) | 35.386 (12) | 50.270 (11) | 01:05.6 | 54.851 |
| 11 | Aliaksandr Lisouski | Belarus | 20.596 (12) | 35.194 (10) | 50.141 (10) | 01:05.9 | 54.648 |
| 12 | Tim Mertens | Belgium | 20.602 (13) | 35.341 (11) | 50.286 (12) | 01:05.9 | 54.601 |
| 13 | Roman Kononenko | Ukraine | 20.683 (14) | 35.907 (14) | 51.171 (13) | 01:06.8 | 53.885 |
| 14 | Reona Sumi | Japan | 20.337 (8) | 35.487 (13) | 51.189 (14) | 01:07.7 | 53.142 |
| 15 | Evgeny Kovalev | Russia | 21.619 (16) | 37.005 (16) | 52.409 (16) | 01:08.5 | 52.57 |
| 16 | Walter Fernando Pérez | Argentina | 20.771 (15) | 36.219 (15) | 52.205 (15) | 01:08.9 | 52.274 |
| 17 | Unai Elorriaga Zubiaur | Spain | 22.434 (17) | 37.838 (17) | 53.478 (17) | 01:09.7 | 51.681 |
| - | Vasileios Galanis | Greece | | | | DNS | |

== Overall standings ==
| Rank | Name | Nation | Points |
|---|---|---|---|
| 1 | Hayden Godfrey | New Zealand | 19 |
| 2 | Leigh Howard | Australia | 28 |
| 3 | Aliaksandr Lisouski | Belarus | 35 |
| 4 | Alois Kaňkovský | Czech Republic | 35 |
| 5 | Robert Bartko | Germany | 37 |
| 6 | Steven Burke | Great Britain | 38 |
| 7 | Bobby Lea | United States | 39 |
| 8 | Tim Mertens | Belgium | 39 |
| 9 | Gianpaolo Biolo | Italy | 43 |
| 10 | Ghislain Boiron | France | 49 |
| 11 | Robert Slippens | Netherlands | 51 |
| 12 | Walter Fernando Pérez | Argentina | 52 |
| 13 | Travis Smith | Canada | 55 |
| 14 | Roman Kononenko | Ukraine | 57 |
| 15 | Evgeny Kovalev | Russia | 66 |
| 16 | Unai Elorriaga Zubiaur | Spain | 68 |
| 17 | Reona Sumi | Japan | 73 |
| DNF | Vasileios Galanis | Greece | |
