= Revolution (cycling series) – Season 5 =

Revolution (cycling series) – Season 5 is the a season of the series of track cycling events primarily held at the Manchester Velodrome in the north west of England

== Season 5 (2007/2008) ==
The first Revolution event of the season was held in October 2007 with a brand new track surface, replaced over the summer after wearing out 17 years early because of heavy use. This season was going to be a vital one for the preparation of the British team. The series built up to the 2008 UCI Track Cycling World Championships in Manchester in March, followed by the Olympic Games in August. Competition for places in the successful squad was fierce, with performances at the Revolution events an important factor in the selection process. At the final event of the season, trials even took place to see who would be the lead off man for Team sprint squad. Jamie Staff performed best on the night and went on to take the place in the squad at the expense of Craig MacLean.

== Sprint competition ==
At the season opening Revolution 17 event top British riders Craig MacLean and Jamie Staff took on international visitors Itmar Estoban and Michael Blanchford. Also in the competition were younger British riders led by the rising star Jason Kenny. Maclean reached the final and came up against Kenny, in what proved to be a significant encounter. Kenny took the victory, a result which would signal the start of a changing of the guard in the sprint squad. In the Keirin race Staff took the victory, pipping Kenny on the line.

Revolution 18 saw a junior sprint competition take place. In the Women's Omnium event, Great Britain took on a German team including Junior World Sprint Champion Kristina Vogel. The British team of Jess Varnish, Becky James and Laura Trott took overall. In the Men's competition the French and Germans provided the opposition. Peter Mitchell came up against Frenchman Charlie Conord in the final, with Conord powering to victory. The evening was rounded off with a Team Sprint event. The British development team were defeated by the Germans, while the main British team were narrowly beaten by the French.

An omnium sprint competition took place at Revolution 19, with reigning World Champion Theo Bos going up against the top British riders. The evening saw a truly dominant performance from Jason Kenny. The opening event saw Kenny set a new personal best time of 10.178 in the 200 Metre Time Trial, defeating World Champion and record holder Bos. He then went on to defeat all comers in the rounds of the sprint omnium. The only race Kenny did not win was the Keirin race at the end of the evening, which was won by Bos to savage some pride from the evening.

In the final event of the season, Revolution 20, Chris Hoy defeated his team mates and the French sprint squad to take victory in the Keirin. In the main sprint competition Ross Edgar defeated Jamie Staff in the final to take the victory. Elsewhere Victoria Pendleton took victory in the Women's competition.

=== Endurance competition ===
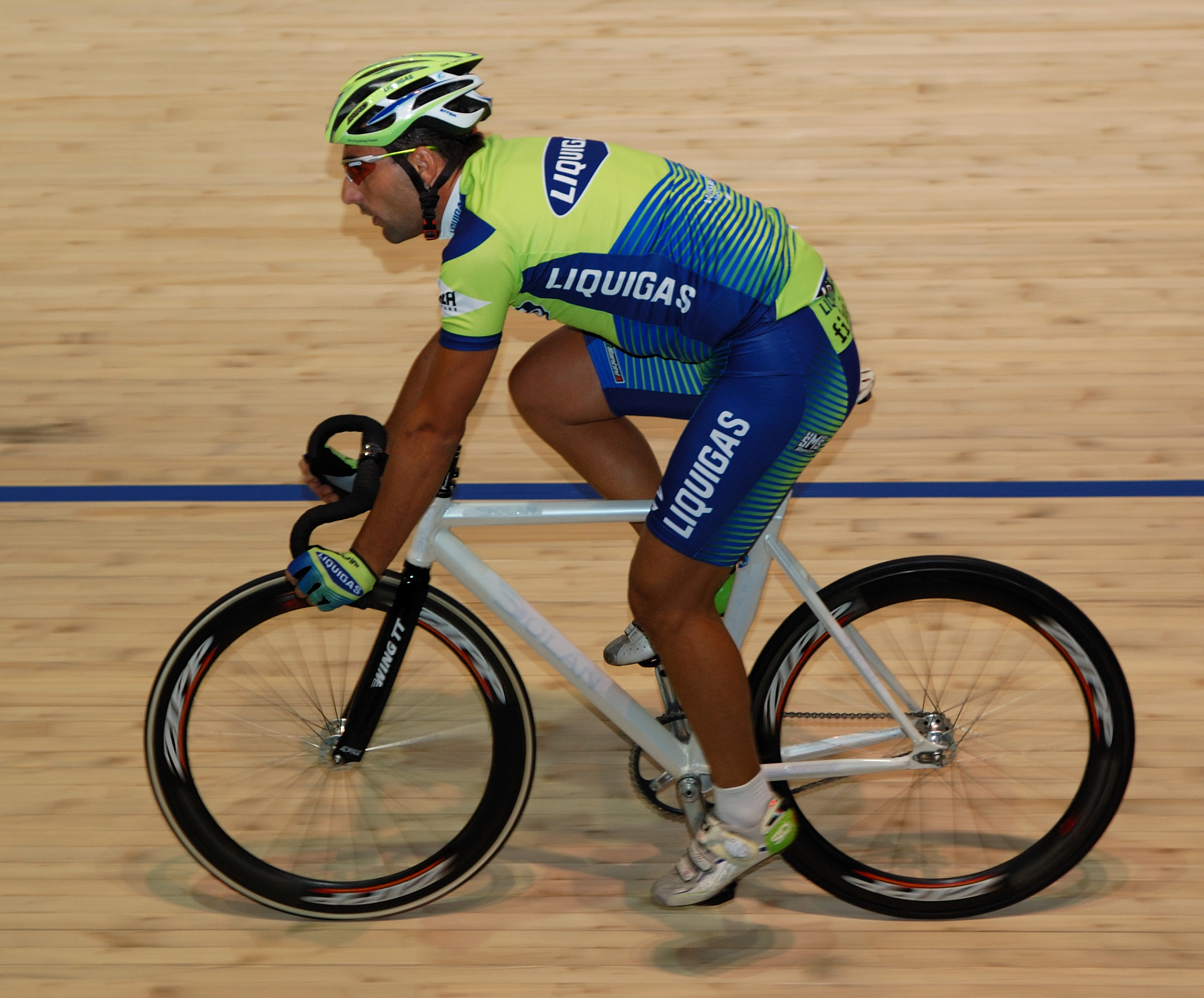
Francesco Chicchi, one of the international stars at Revolution 17.

Competition was also strong in the endurance ranks. Established stars and Revolution regulars like Chris Newton, Mark Cavendish and Rob Hayles faced stiff competition from their young team mates and a host of international stars.

At the opening Revolution 17 event, the season got under way with a motor paced scratch race. Mark Cavendish make a move on the last lap to come around the outside of the field and take victory on the line from Geraint Thomas. In the Points Race a group of seven riders broke clear including Newton, Cavendish, Clancy and American Colby Pearce. The group gained a lap on the field, with the race coming down to a sprint between the seven. Peace was able to hit the line first, followed home be Clancy and Newton. The feature scratch race was a frantic affair, with four riders breaking away from the field. The smooth teamwork of Newton, David O'Loughlin, Mike Friedman and Magnus Bäckstedt allowed them to gain a lap on the field. The rest of the field were then withdrawn in the closing laps to allow the four to sprint it out for victory alone. Newton made no mistake and lead from the front to take a clear victory.

Revolution 18 saw a strong field of riders, including Bradley Wiggins, Franco Marvulli and World Points Race Champion Joan Llaneras. Marvulli took the opening Motor Paced Scratch race, with Wiggins taking second place. Next up was the Scratch Race, which saw a break away gaining a lap featuring Wiggins, Llanearas, Newton and Ben Swift. Wiggins looked set to take victory in the sprint but just failed to get around young Swift who took the victory. The young British riders form continued as Peter Kennaugh, Johnny Bellis and Andy Tennant defeated their senior Spanish opponents in a Team Pursuit Challenge. A feature length Points Race rounded off the evening, with much expected of the big names in the field. However the likes of Wiggins and Llanearas and Marvulli did not have it their own way as they were not involved in the various break aways that took place. In the end Newton continued his resurrenge of form in the Points Race by taking victory from O'Loughlin and Toni Tauler.

Mark Cavendish returned at Revolution 19 to continue his build up to a busy road and track season in 2008. He made an early break for home in Motor Pace Scratch Race, however he could not hold off the charging Newton who took victory from Steven Burke. The Points Race was contested at the front by youngsters Kennaugh, Swift and Burke. Swift held the lead going until the final stages, until threatened by a late break by Kennaugh to take the final sprint. However Swift came home in fourth in the sprint to take the victory by one point. This trio then also dominated the closing stages of the Scratch race, freezing out the big guns like Newton. Burke took a close finish on the line to add to his National Scratch Race Title.

In the season finale it was an all team affair, with all the events competed in Madison pairings. The duo of Rob Hayles and Geraint Thomas took victory in the Elimination Scratch race. A unique team Points race also took place, with each rider of the duo competing half of the race before changing over with his team mate. Iljo Keisse and Dimitri DeFauw took victory in this fast paced event. In the feature Madison race the duos of Peter Schep and Jens Mouris and Great Britain's Rob Hayles and Geraint Thomas gained a lap and fought it out for the victory. Schrep finished ahead of Hayles in the final sprint to take the victory.

In the Madison Time Trial event, early season victories went to the teams of Mark Cavendish and Ed Clancy and Ben Swift and Jonathan Bellis. At Revolution 19 the duo of Steven Burke and Peter Kennaugh took the top spot. The competition at Revolution 20 was eagerly awaited as current record co-holder Arnaud Tournant was to team up with the legendary Chris Hoy to attempt to beat the record. News of Tournant's shoulder injury, making a proper hand sling changeover impossible, put their record attempt in doubt. However the crowd were on their feat as the duo set a new record with an awesome time of 54.5 seconds, which still stands today.

=== Future Stars series ===
In the boys competition the stand out performer was Dan McLay, who finished some distance ahead of nearest rival Chris Whorral. In the girls competition it was closer at the top with Corinne Hall taking victory in the end over Hannah Manley.

== See also ==
- Revolution (cycling series)
- 2007 in track cycling
- 2008 in track cycling
