= 2008 UCI Track Cycling World Championships – Men's scratch =

Men's scratch at the 2008 UCI Track Cycling World Championships
- Venue: Manchester Velodrome, Manchester
- Date: 26 March 2008

The Men's scratch event of the 2008 UCI Track Cycling World Championships was held on 26 March 2008.

== Results ==
Rank	Name	Nation
1	Aliaksandr Lisouski	Belarus
2	Wim Stroetinga	Netherlands
3	Roger Kluge	Germany
4	Rafał Ratajczyk	Poland
5	Ángel Dario Colla	Argentina
6	Kazuhiro Mori	Japan
7	Andreas Müller	Austria
8	Juan Pablo Forero	Colombia
9	Hayden Godfrey	New Zealand
10	Luis Mansilla	Chile
11	Martin Bláha	Czech Republic
12	Daniel Kreutzfeldt	Denmark
13	Jérôme Neuville	France
14	Tim Mertens	Belgium
15	Ho Ting Kwok	Hong Kong
16	Vadim Shaekhov	Uzbekistan
17	Martino Marcotto	Italy
18	Michael Friedman	United States
19	Ivan Kovalev	Russia
20	Leigh Howard	Australia
DNF	Martin Gilbert	Canada
DNF	Steven Burke	United Kingdom
DNF	Hariff Salleh	Malaysia
DNF	Oleksandr Martynenko	Ukraine
