= Ghislain Boiron =

French cyclist

Personal information
- Born: 26 May 1988 (age 38)

Cycling career
- Sport: Cycling
- Discipline: Track cycling
- Role: Rider

Ghislain Boiron (born 26 May 1988) is a French male track cyclist, riding for the national team. He competed in the omnium event at the 2010 UCI Track Cycling World Championships.
