= Leif Lampater =

German cyclist (born 1982)

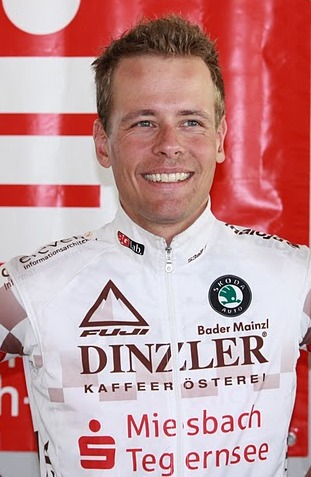

Personal information
- Full name: Leif Lampater
- Born: 22 December 1982 (age 43) Waiblingen, West Germany

Cycling career
- Sport: Cycling
- Current team: Retired
- Disciplines: Track; Road
- Role: Rider
- Rider type: Endurance (track)

Amateur teams
- 2004: RSG Heilbronn
- 2005: RSV Werner Otto Berlin
- 2006–2008: TSV Schmiden
- 2008: activity-racing-team
- 2009–2015: RSV Irschenberg
- 2011–2013: Rudy Project Racing Team
- 2014–2015: Maloja Pushbikers

Professional team
- 2016–2018: Rad-Net Rose Team

Leif Lampater (born 22 December 1982 in Waiblingen) is a German former professional racing cyclist. He competed in the men's team pursuit at the 2004 Summer Olympics.

He mainly focused on track cycling and excelled in the madison, individual pursuit, team pursuit and six-day racing. In his career, Lampater won three national titles in the team pursuit and the madison. he has won Track cycling World Cups in team pursuit twice and twice in madison. On top of that he won a total of eleven six-day cycling events.

== Major results ==
2001
1st Team pursuit, UCI Track Cycling World Cup Classics, Ipoh (with Marc Altmann, Christian Müller and Bernhard Wachter)
2nd Team pursuit, National Track Championships (with Daniel Palicki, Daniel Schlegel and Andreas Walzer)
2002
3rd Team pursuit, UEC European Under-23 Track Championships (with Marc Altmann, Christian Müller and Daniel Schlegel)
3rd Criterium, Backnang-Waldrems
2003
2nd Team pursuit, UCI Track Cycling World Cup Classics, Sydney (with Marc Altmann, Guido Fulst and Andreas Müller)
2nd Team pursuit, National Track Championships (with Sven Krauß, Stefan Löffler and Christoph Meschenmoser)
Under-23 UIV Cup

3rd Amsterdam (with Sebastian Frey)
3rd Munich (with Sven Krauß)

2004
2004–05 UCI Track Cycling World Cup Classics, Los Angeles

1st Madison (with Robert Bartko)
1st Team pursuit (with Robert Bartko, Robert Bengsch and Henning Bommel)

2nd Stuttgart, Under-23 UIV Cup (with Andreas Welsch)
3rd Team pursuit, 2004 UCI Track Cycling World Cup Classics, Sydney (with Robert Bengsch, Guido Fulst and Christian Lademann)
3rd Criterium, Zusmarshausen
4th Team pursuit, Summer Olympics (with Robert Bartko, Guido Fulst and Christian Lademann)
2005
2005–06 UCI Track Cycling World Cup Classics

1st Madison, Manchester (with Guido Fulst)
2nd Madison, Moscow (with Guido Fulst)

National Track Championships

1st Team pursuit (with Robert Bartko, Guido Fulst and Karl-Christian König)
3rd Madison (with Christian Grasmann)

1st Criterium, Stuttgart
2004–05 UCI Track Cycling World Cup Classics, Manchester

3rd Madison (with Andreas Müller)
3rd Team pursuit (with Christian Bach, Robert Bengsch and Henning Bommel)

3rd Criterium, Bad Harzburg
2006
1st Six Days of Stuttgart (with Robert Bartko and Guido Fulst)
National Track Championships

2nd Individual pursuit
2nd Team pursuit (with Christian Grasmann, Rolf Hofbauer and Stephan Lägeler)

2nd Six Days of Dortmund (with Guido Fulst)
3rd Team pursuit, 2006–07 UCI Track Cycling World Cup Classics, Moscow (with Robert Bartko, Robert Bengsch and Guido Fulst)
3rd Six Days of Berlin (with Guido Fulst)
3rd Six Days of Zürich (with Guido Fulst)
9th Overall Giro del Capo
2007
1st Six Days of Berlin (with Guido Fulst)
2nd Six Days of Bremen (with Guido Fulst)
2nd Six Days of Dortmund (with Erik Zabel)
2nd Six Days of Munich (with Erik Zabel)
2nd Criterium, Kirchheim-Teck
3rd Six Days of Zürich (with Guido Fulst)
2008
1st Six Days of Dortmund (with Erik Zabel)
1st Six Days of Rotterdam (with Danny Stam)
1st Six Days of Stuttgart (with Robert Bartko and Iljo Keisse)
National Track Championships

2nd Madison
2nd Team pursuit

2nd Six Days of Berlin (with Guido Fulst)
2nd Six Days of Bremen (with Erik Zabel)
2nd Six Days of Ghent (with Erik Zabel)
2nd Six Days of Munich (with Erik Zabel)
3rd Six Days of Zürich (with Alexander Äschbach)
2009
1st Six Days of Bremen (with Erik Zabel)
1st West Indies vs. the World, Port of Spain
National Track Championships

2nd Team pursuit
3rd Madison

2nd Six Days of Hasselt (with Léon van Bon)
2nd Six Days of Zürich (with Christian Grasmann)
3rd Six Days of Munich (with Christian Grasmann)
3rd Six Days of Rotterdam (with Franco Marvulli)
2010
National Track Championships

1st Madison (with Christian Grasmann)
2nd Team pursuit

2nd Six Days of Ghent (with Kenny De Ketele)
2nd Harlem Skyscraper Criterium
3rd Six Days of Bremen (with Christian Grasmann)
8th Mumbai Cyclothon
2011
2nd Six Days of Fiorenzuola (with Franco Marvulli)
2012
National Track Championships

2nd Madison
2nd Team pursuit

3rd Six Days of Bremen (with Iljo Keisse)
3rd Six Days of Copenhagen (with Robert Bartko)
2013
National Track Championships

1st Madison (with Nico Heßlich)
2nd Team pursuit
3rd Team sprint

1st Six Days of Ghent (with Jasper De Buyst)
2nd Six Days of Bremen (with Luke Roberts)
2nd Six Days of Copenhagen (with Luke Roberts)
2014
National Track Championships

1st Madison (with Marcel Kalz)
3rd Individual pursuit

1st Six Days of Bremen (with Wim Stroetinga)
2nd Six Days of Berlin (with Jasper De Buyst)
2nd Six Days of Zürich (with Silvan Dillier)
3rd Six Days of Copenhagen (with Marc Hester)
3rd Six Days of Ghent (with Silvan Dillier)
2015
1st Six Days of Berlin (with Marcel Kalz)
3rd Team pursuit, 2015–16 UCI Track Cycling World Cup, Cambridge (with Maximilian Beyer, Theo Reinhardt and Kersten Thiele)
National Track Championships

3rd Individual pursuit
3rd Madison

3rd Six Days of Bremen (with Wim Stroetinga)
3rd Six Days of Copenhagen (with Marcel Kalz)
2016
National Track Championships

1st Team pursuit (with Maximilian Beyer, Lucas Liss and Marco Mathis)
3rd Omnium

2017
National Track Championships

1st Omnium
3rd Team pursuit

2nd Team time trial, National Road Championships
2018
National Track Championships

1st Team pursuit (with Jasper Frahm, Felix Groß and Lucas Liss)
2nd Scratch

3rd Six Days of Copenhagen (with Marc Hester)
