= Gerd Dörich =

German cyclist

Personal information
- Born: 14 February 1968 (age 58) Sindelfingen, Germany

Cycling career
- Sport: Cycling
- Discipline: Racing
- Role: Rider

Gerd Dörich (born 14 February 1968, in Sindelfingen) is a former German professional racing cyclist. Over his professional career, he competed in 168 six-day races.

After retirement, Dörich began working with “Aktion Steilkurve” (Action Steep Curve), a cycling programme for children with disabilities. The programme involves pairing disabled children with experienced racing cyclists to ride on tandem bikes in the velodrome to give the children confidence. Due to the speed required to keep a bike upright in the velodrome, children experience the feeling of being on a "rollercoaster" or flying. The project is an initiative of the German charity Aktion Hilfe für Kinder.

== Career wins ==
2004
National Championship, Track, Madison, Elite, Germany (GER)
Stuttgart, Six Days (GER)
