= Vasilios Galanis =

Greek footballer

Personal information
- Full name: Vasilios Galanis
- Date of birth: 17 August 1987 (age 39)
- Place of birth: Greece
- Height: 1.90 m (6 ft 3 in)
- Position: Forward

Senior career*
Years	Team	Apps	(Gls)
2005–2006	SKoda Xanthi		
2006–2007	Panathinaikos F.C.		
2007–2008	Koropi F.C.		
2008–2009	Apollon Kalamarias F.C.	5	(0)
2009–2010	Gaz Metan Mediaş	8	(0)
2012	UTA Arad	11	(4)
2012–2013	Olympiacos Volos	4	(0)
- * Club domestic league appearances and goals as of 30 September 2012

Vasilios Galanis (Greek: Βασίλειος Γαλάνης; born 17 August 1987) is a Greek footballer who plays for Olympiacos Volos in the Football League as a forward.
