= Robert Bengsch =

German cyclist

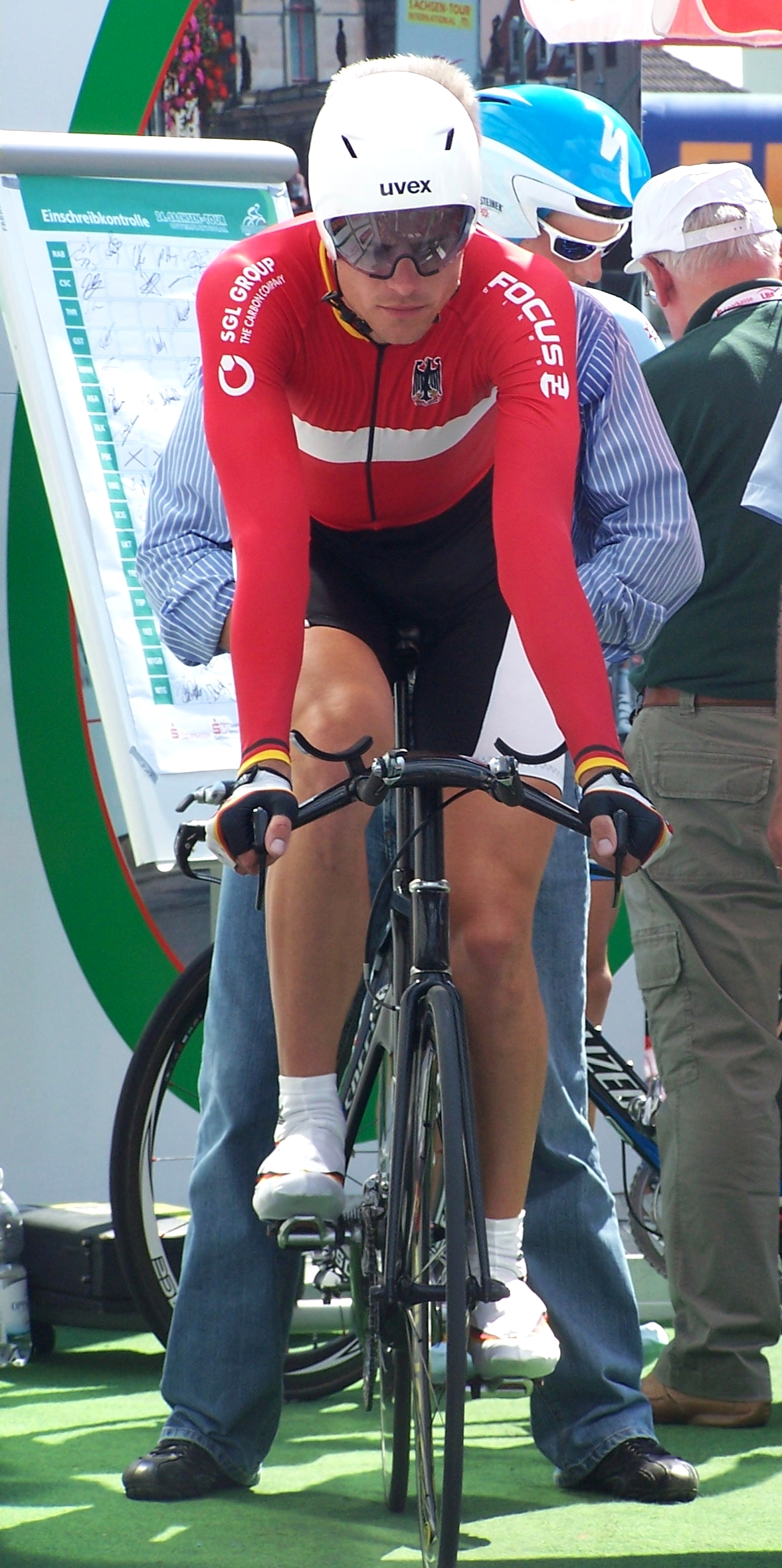

Personal information
- Born: 6 October 1983 (age 43) Frankfurt (Oder)

Cycling career
- Sport: Cycling
- Disciplines: Track, road
- Role: Rider
- Rider type: endurance

Robert Bengsch (born 6 October 1983) is a German track cyclist, riding for the national team. He competed at the 2007, 2010 and 2011 UCI Track Cycling World Championships.

== Major results ==
=== Road ===
2001
1st Stage 1 Coupe du Président de la ville de Grudziądz
2008
1st Overall Tour Alsace

1st Stage 3

2010
1st Stage 4 Tour of Bulgaria
