= Aliaksandr Lisouski =

Belarusian racing cyclist (b. 1985)

Personal information
- Born: Аляксандр Лісоўскі; 13 November 1985 (age 40)

Cycling career
- Sport: Cycling
- Discipline: Racing
- Role: Rider
Medal record
Representing Belarus
Men's track cycling
World Championships
Gold medal – first place	2008 Manchester	Scratch
Bronze medal – third place	2008 Manchester	Omnium

Aliaksandr Lisouski (born 13 November 1985 in Gomel) is a Belarusian racing cyclist. At the 2008 UCI Track Cycling World Championships, he won the gold medal in the scratch race and the bronze in the omnium. Lisouski began cycling in Gomel, his first coach was Anatoly Viktorovich Borets. In 2008 he was Honored Master of Sports of the Republic of Belarus.
