= John Tokarua =

Australian lacrosse player

John Tokarua is a lacrosse player from Melbourne, Australia. Originally from the Caulfield Lacrosse club in Victoria, Tokarua played one season at Malvern Lacrosse Club where he won Fairest and Best for his club and his state (2002). Tokarua represented Australia in the 1996 World Under-19 Lacrosse Championship before being selected in the seniors for the 2002 and 2006 World Lacrosse Championships, where he gained All-World selection at the latter. Tokarua was named Co-Captain for 2010 Australian Team that won bronze in Manchester, England. Tokarua was also named Co-Captain of the 2014 Australian Team, who were beaten by the Iriquois in the bronze medal game in Denver, Colorado, to finish fourth. Tokarua retired from international lacrosse following the tournament at the age of 38. A two-time Australian Lacrosse League All-Star, Tokarua has gained a fierce reputation as a groundball, takeaway and goalscoring machine off the defensive midfield line. Tokarua was also drafted by the San Francisco Dragons in the Major League Lacrosse.
