= Australian Lacrosse League =

Lacrosse competition in Australia

- Sport: Lacrosse
- Founded: 2004
- First season: 2004
- Folded: 2007
- Country: Australia
- Sponsor: Toyota

The Australian Lacrosse League (ALL) was an elite-level men's lacrosse competition that ran from 2004 to 2007 with the aim of boosting the profile and participation of the sport in Australia. The ALL replaced the Australian Senior Lacrosse Championships, which was held annually during a week-long carnival. Due to the unpopularity among some groups toward the format of the competition, from 2008 the national championship is again been contested as a carnival at a single venue.

The three strongest lacrosse-playing states of Victoria, South Australia and Western Australia competed in the ALL. The long-term goal of the league was to include a team from every Australian state.

Teams played each other twice, with double-headers (a Saturday and Sunday game) played over three weekends. Each state hosted one double-header and travelled for the other. The two teams with the best win–loss record over the round-robin tournament progressed to the final, played on the weekend following the last round-robin match.

== ALL Champions ==
- 2004 - Victoria
- 2005 - Victoria
- 2006 - Western Australia
- 2007 - Victoria

== ALL Results ==
- Australian Lacrosse League 2004 season
- Australian Lacrosse League 2005 season
- Australian Lacrosse League 2006 season
- Australian Lacrosse League 2007 season

== See also ==
- Lacrosse in Australia
- List of Australian Lacrosse national champions
