= Hayden Godfrey =

New Zealand cyclist

Personal information
- Full name: Hayden Godfrey
- Born: 15 December 1978 (age 47) Hokitika, New Zealand

Cycling career
- Sport: Cycling
- Discipline: Road
- Role: Rider

Amateur team
- 2008: Subway-Avanti

Professional teams
- 2002–2004: 7Up-NutraFig
- 2005: Kodak Easyshare Gallery
- 2006: Team Monex
- 2007: Colavita–Sutter Home
- 2009–2011: Subway-Avanti
Medal record
Men's track cycling
Representing New Zealand
Commonwealth Games
Bronze medal – third place	2006 Melbourne	Team pursuit
World Championships
Gold medal – first place	2008 Manchester	Omnium

Hayden Godfrey (born 15 December 1978 in Hokitika, New Zealand) is a cycling competitor for New Zealand. He competed at the 2006 Commonwealth Games in Melbourne where along with Tim Gudsell, Peter Latham and Marc Ryan he won a bronze medal in the Team pursuit.

== Major results ==
2001
UCI World Cup Classics, Cali

1st Team pursuit
2nd Individual pursuit

1st Stage 1 Brandenburg Rundfahrt
2002
1st Points classification Tour of Southland
2003
UCI World Cup Classics, Aguascalientes

2nd Individual pursuit

UCI World Cup Classics, Sydney

1st Team pursuit
2nd Individual pursuit

2004
UCI World Cup Classics, Aguascalientes

2nd Team pursuit

1st Prologue Sea Otter Classic
2005
UCI World Cup Classics, Manchester

1st Team pursuit

UCI World Cup Classics, Sydney

1st Team pursuit

New Zealand Cycle Classic

1st Points classification
1st Stages 1 & 7

1st Points classification Tour of Southland
National Road Championships

3rd Road race
5th Time trial

2006
National Road Championships

2nd Road race
3rd Time trial

3rd Team pursuit, Commonwealth games
2007
National Road Championships

6th Time trial

2008
1st Omnium, UCI Track World Championships
2009
UCI World Cup Classics, Beijing

1st Scratch race

2010
UCI World Cup Classics, Beijing

2nd Scratch race
