= 2008 UCI Track Cycling World Championships – Men's madison =

Men's madison at the 2008 UCI Track Cycling World Championships
- Venue: Manchester Velodrome, Manchester
- Date: 29 March 2008

The Men's madison event of the 2008 UCI Track Cycling World Championships was held on 29 March 2008.

== Results ==
Rank	Name	Nation	S1	S2	S3	S4	S5	S6	S7	S8	S9	S10	Points	Laps down
1	Mark Cavendish; Bradley Wiggins	United Kingdom	5		1		3	1	1	5		3	19	
2	Roger Kluge; Olaf Pollack	Germany		1	2		2	3			5		13	
3	Michael Mørkøv; Alex Rasmussen	Denmark		5		5						1	11	
4	Kenny De Ketele; Iljo Keisse	Belgium		3			1		2			2	8	
5	Franco Marvulli; Bruno Risi	Switzerland								3			3	
6	Joan Llaneras Rosello; Carlos Torrent Tarres	Spain				1							1	
7	Matthieu Ladagnous; Jérôme Neuville	France	2		5						3	5	15	-1
8	Juan Esteban Curuchet; Walter Fernando Pérez	Argentina					5		5		2		12	-1
9	Greg Henderson; Hayden Roulston	New Zealand	3		3			2	3				11	-1
10	Jens Mouris; Peter Schep	Netherlands		2						2	1		5	-1
11	Angelo Ciccone; Fabio Masotti	Italy											0	-1
12	Makoto Iijima; Kazuhiro Mori	Japan						5					5	-2
13	Michael Friedman; Colby Pearce	United States	1			2				1			4	-2
14	Alois Kaňkovský; Petr Lazar	Czech Republic				3							3	-2
15	Lyubomyr Polatayko; Volodymyr Rybin	Ukraine											0	-2
DNF	Martin Gilbert; Ryan Mckenzie	Canada											0	-3
DNF	Sun Jae Jang; Jae Wan Jung	South Korea											0	-2
DNF	Mikhail Ignatiev; Alexei Markov	Russia											0	-1
