= Netcompany–Ineos =

British professional cycling team

Netcompany-Ineos Cycling Team

Team information
- UCI code: SKY (2010–2019); INS (2019–2020); IGD (2020–2026); NCI (2026–)
- Registered: United Kingdom
- Founded: 2009
- Discipline: Road
- Status: UCI WorldTeam
- Bicycles: Pinarello
- Components: Shimano
- Website: Team home page

Key personnel
- General manager: John Allert
- Team managers: Servais Knaven; Brett Lancaster; Matteo Tosatto

Team name history
| 2010 | Sky Professional Cycling |
| 2011–2013 | Sky Procycling |
| 2014–2019 | Team Sky |
| 2019–2020 | Team Ineos |
| 2020–2026 | Ineos Grenadiers |
| 2026– | Netcompany-Ineos Cycling Team |

Netcompany-Ineos Cycling Team (UCI team code: NCI) (formerly Team Sky from 2010 to 2019, Team Ineos from 2019 to 2020, and Ineos Grenadiers from 2020 to 2026) is a British professional cycling team that competes at the UCI WorldTeam level. The team is based at the National Cycling Centre in Manchester, England, with a logistics base in Deinze, Belgium. The team is managed by British Cycling's former performance director, Sir Dave Brailsford. Tour Racing Ltd is the corporate entity behind the team in all its iterations, which in line with cycling practice adopts the name of their current primary sponsor.

The team launched in 2010 with the ambition of winning the Tour de France with a British rider within five years, a goal achieved in two years when Bradley Wiggins won the 2012 Tour de France, becoming the first British winner in its history, while teammate and fellow Briton Chris Froome finished as the runner up and then went on to win the 2013 Tour de France. Froome won three more Tour de France titles for the team in 2015, 2016 and 2017. Froome went on to win the 2017 Vuelta a España and the 2018 Giro d'Italia, making him the champion of all three Grand Tours at once.

Froome was retrospectively awarded victory in the 2011 Vuelta a España, after the original winner Juan José Cobo was stripped of his title due to doping. The team won the 2018 Tour de France with Geraint Thomas, the 2019 Tour de France and 2021 Giro d'Italia with Egan Bernal, and the 2020 Giro d'Italia with Tao Geoghegan Hart, meaning that the team won seven of the eight editions of the Tour de France between 2012 and 2019, with four different riders, and five further grand tours between 2011 and 2021.

Following the decision by British media company Sky UK not to renew sponsorship, the team secured financial support from the British chemicals group Ineos, with the team renamed as Team Ineos from April 2019. In August 2020, the team was rebranded as Ineos Grenadiers to reflect Ineos Automotive's off-road vehicle, the Ineos Grenadier. This name lasted until 2026, when the team struck a €100 million sponsorship deal with Netcompany, a Danish IT firm, for a five-year term.

== History ==
=== Formation ===
The creation of the team was announced on 26 February 2009, with the major sponsorship provided by BSkyB. The company was searching for a sport in which they could have a positive and wide-ranging impact through their sponsorship. British Cycling first began their relationship with BSkyB in 2008 with a £1 million a year sponsorship for their track cycling team. After a trip to the Manchester Velodrome, British Cycling's National Cycling Centre, in 2008, then BSkyB chairman James Murdoch quickly became keen on the sport. Over the summer of 2008 BSkyB were lobbied by British Cycling and key figures such as David Brailsford and Chris Boardman to launch a British road cycling team which would compete in road cycling's major events. BSkyB agreed to finance the team with €15 million a year, aiming for a British rider to win the Tour de France within five years. Initially a supermarket was in talks to become a co-sponsor.

Team Sky's original intention was to build a 25-man squad with a core of British riders and to nurture the young talent. The first six riders confirmed were Geraint Thomas, Steve Cummings, Chris Froome, Russell Downing, Ian Stannard and Peter Kennaugh, all British riders. The ambition to "ensure competitiveness" through other signings, including a number of foreign riders, was expressed. On 10 September 2009, a further ten riders were confirmed as set to ride for the team. These were Edvald Boasson Hagen, Thomas Löfkvist, Kurt Asle Arvesen, Simon Gerrans, Juan Antonio Flecha, Kjell Carlström, John-Lee Augustyn, Greg Henderson, Lars Petter Nordhaug, and Morris Possoni. Further additions to the squad, including Chris Sutton and Bradley Wiggins from Garmin–Slipstream, Michael Barry, and Ben Swift from Team Katusha were made before the beginning of the 2010 season. Prior to their first season six jerseys were screen tested to ensure visibility whilst filmed in race conditions.

=== 2010: The beginning ===
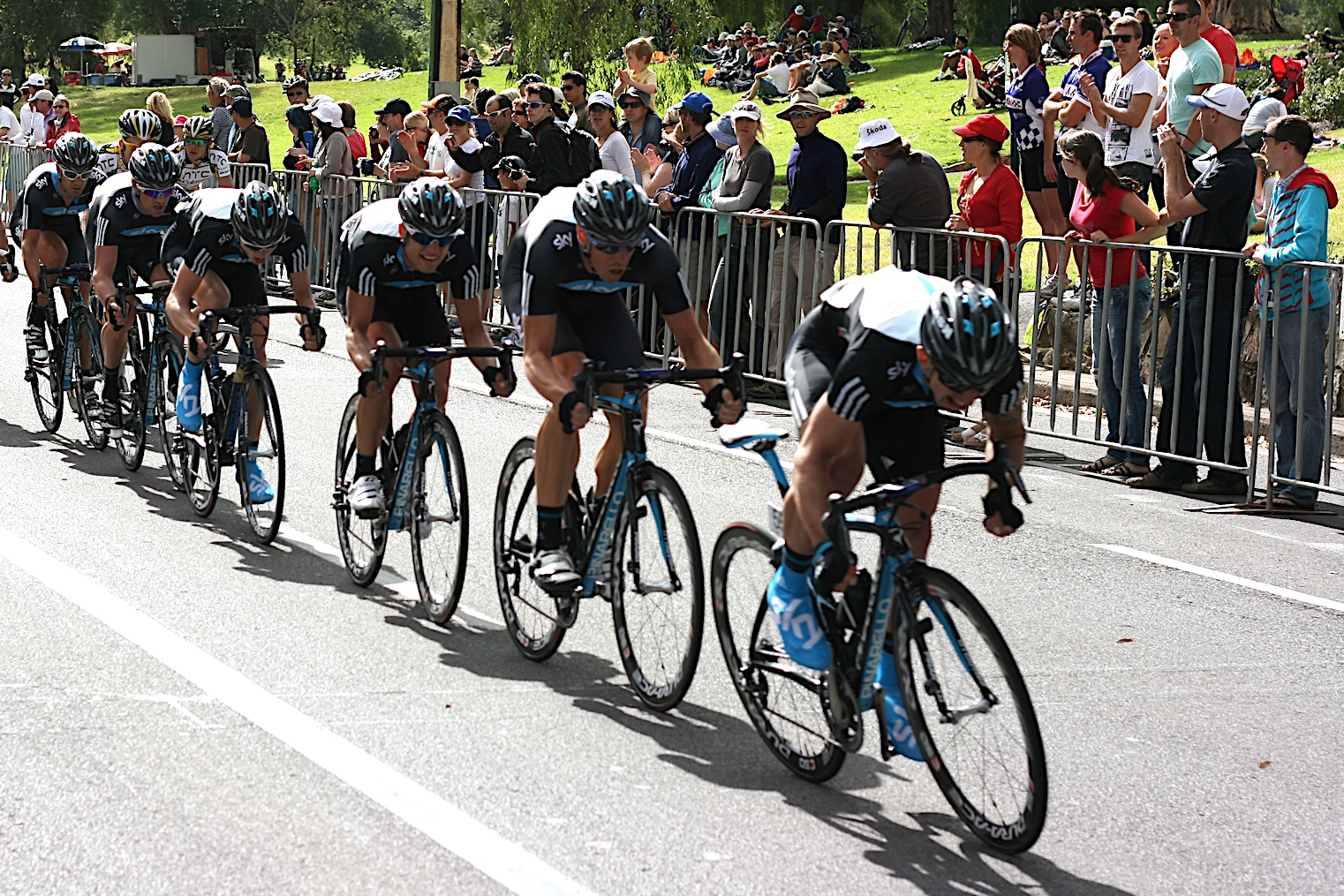
Sky at their first race, the 2010 Cancer Council Helpline Classic in Adelaide, Australia.

The team gained a victory in its first race in January 2010, the Cancer Council Helpline Classic in Adelaide, Australia, a one-day race prior to the Tour Down Under, with Greg Henderson and Chris Sutton taking first and second respectively. Team Sky's first ProTour event was the Tour Down Under in January. The team was awarded a wild-card entry for the Tour de France. Team Sky was also invited to compete in the other two of the year's Grand Tours. In February 2010 the team got its first one-day victory when Juan Antonio Flecha won the Belgian semi-classic Omloop Het Nieuwsblad with a solo break.

On 9 May Wiggins became the first Sky rider to wear the leader's jersey of a Grand Tour when he won the opening prologue of the Giro d'Italia. That same month Ben Swift became the first rider to win an overall classification winning the Tour de Picardie. In the Team's first Tour de France, Geraint Thomas finished second on the cobblestones of stage three, and wore the white jersey as leader of the young rider classification. The Tour was a disappointment for Sky though, with Thomas Löfkvist in 17th overall being their highest placed rider (Wiggins finished in 24th place). Löfkvist led Team Sky at the Vuelta a España, but the team withdrew after stage seven following the death of soigneur Txema González. In total Team Sky recorded 22 wins in their debut season, with a further 50 podiums.

=== 2011: Grand Tour breakthrough ===
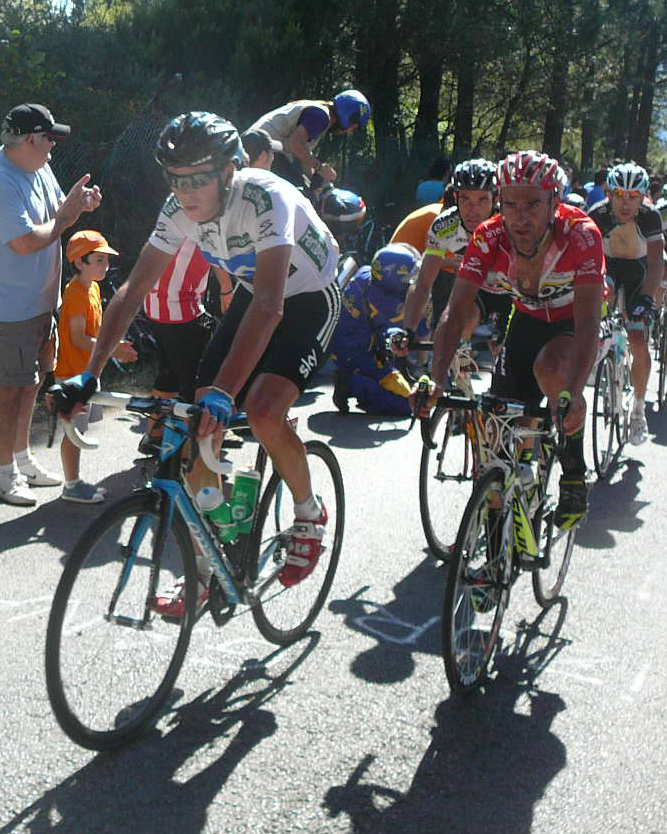
Team Sky's Chris Froome (left) at the 2011 Vuelta a España, where he finished second overall. At the time this was Sky's highest in a Grand Tour.

Team Sky again began the season in Australia, with Ben Swift winning two stages of the Tour Down Under, and finishing third overall. Juan Antonio Flecha and Jeremy Hunt finished fourth and sixth respectively in the Tour of Qatar in February, while Boasson Hagen finished first in the points classification and second overall in the Tour of Oman later that month. In the Classics season, Wiggins finished third overall in Paris–Nice and Geraint Thomas finished second overall at the Dwars door Vlaanderen. The team enjoyed a successful Tour of California, with Ben Swift winning stage two and Greg Henderson taking victory in stage three.

At the Giro d'Italia, Thomas Lofkvist was the highest placed Sky rider, finishing 21st overall. The closest the team came to a stage victory was Davide Appollonio's second place on stage 12. Geraint Thomas secured Sky's first overall victory of the season, by winning the five-day Bayern-Rundfahrt race at the end of May. Boasson Hagen and Wiggins also won stages in the event, with Boasson Hagen claiming the points jersey. In June, Wiggins won the Critérium du Dauphiné, an important victory for Sky at the time.

At the Tour de France Sky finished third on stage two, the team time trial. Boasson Hagen secured the team's first ever Tour stage win on stage six. On stage seven, just over 40 km (24.9 mi) from the finish, a crash brought down team leader Wiggins breaking his collarbone and ending his tour. This prompted a change of approach from Sky, with their riders targeting stage wins. On stage nine, Juan Antonio Flecha was hit by a French media car, which resulted in Flecha colliding with Vacansoleil–DCM rider Johnny Hoogerland, who crashed into a barbed-wire fence.

Both riders were able to continue despite sustaining injuries in the incident. Geraint Thomas won the combativity award on stage 12. Boasson Hagen came second to compatriot Thor Hushovd (Garmin–Cervélo) on stage 16, before winning the next stage with a solo breakaway. He also finished second on the stage 21 on the Champs-Élysées. Rigoberto Urán was the highest placed Sky rider with 24th overall, whilst Boasson Hagen's efforts gave the team two stage wins in an eventful Tour.

After the Tour de France, Boasson Hagen's good form continued, as he won the Vattenfall Cyclassics and took a clean sweep of jerseys at the Eneco Tour. In the third and final Grand Tour of the 2011 season, the Vuelta a España, Sky riders Froome and Wiggins finished second and third respectively in the general classification. Chris Sutton won stage two, while Froome won stage 17 of the event. On 11 October, it was announced that world champion Mark Cavendish would be joining the team for the 2012 season, bringing an end to months of speculation. He was joined by his HTC–Highroad teammate Bernhard Eisel.

On 17 July 2019, the UCI awarded Froome the Vuelta title after then winner Juan José Cobo was disqualified for abnormalities related to performance-enhancing drugs on his biological passport. This now recognizes Froome as the first British cyclist to win any of the Grand Tours, and the result also elevated Wiggins to second place.

=== 2012: Tour de France victory ===
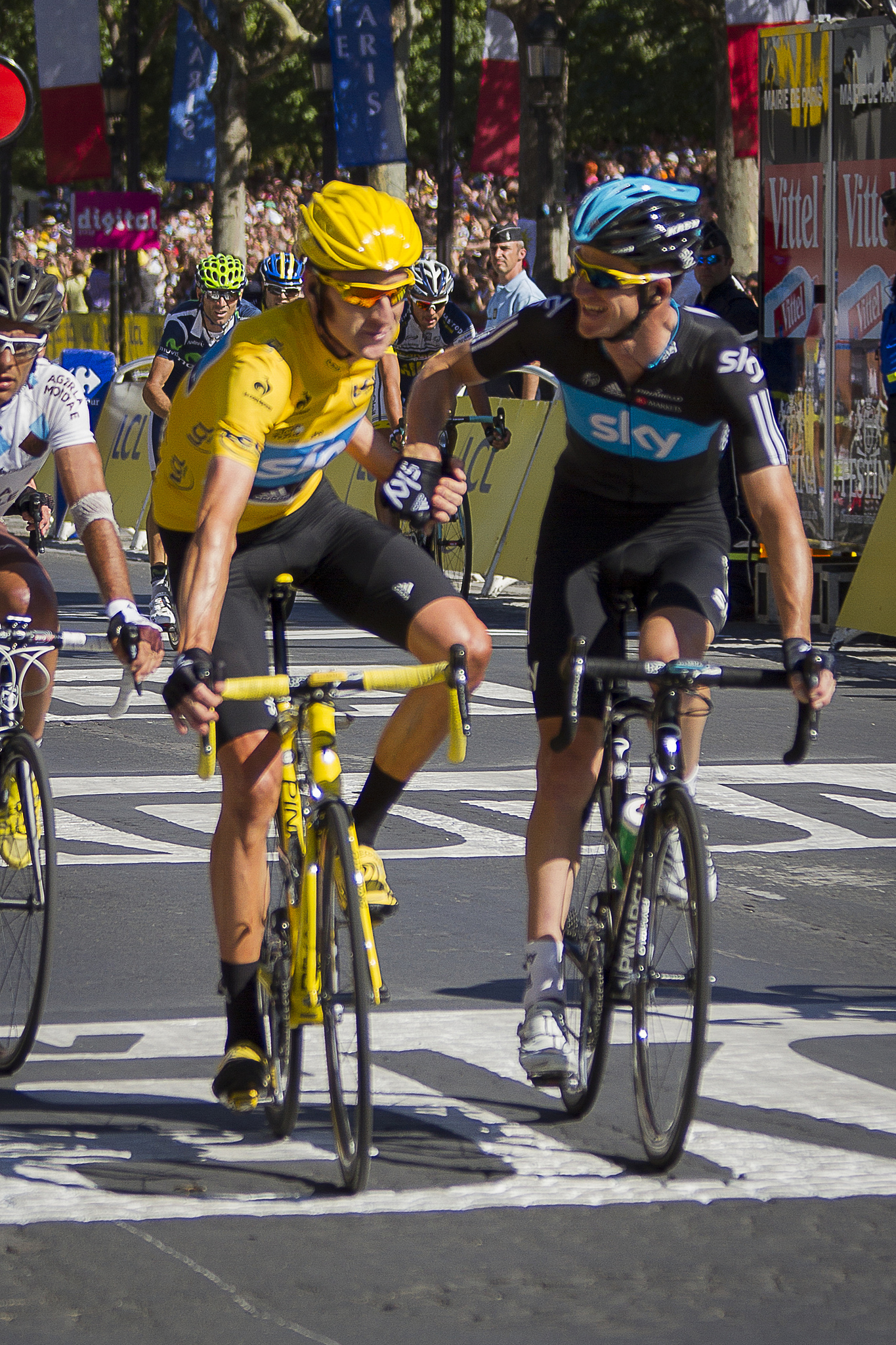
Bradley Wiggins crosses the finish line on the Champs-Élysées with Michael Rogers to win the 2012 Tour de France

In January, Team Sky confirmed their squad for the 2012 season which included eight new signings, Cavendish, Eisel, Sergio Henao, Danny Pate, Richie Porte, Salvatore Puccio, Luke Rowe and Kanstantsin Sivtsov.

At the Tour Down Under in January, Boasson Hagen won the sprint classification. In February Sky claimed the team classification at the Volta ao Algarve, with Porte winning the overall and Boasson Hagen the points classification. Wiggins won the overall classifications in the Paris–Nice in March and the Tour de Romandie in April.

Sky dominated the Tour de France general classification with Wiggins first and Froome second overall, and Cavendish winning three stages including the sprint on the final stage on the Champs-Élysées in Paris. On 9 September, the team achieved their 100th victory with Lars Petter Nordhaug's win in the Grand Prix Cycliste de Montréal. The team also topped the UCI World Tour teams classification, with a total score of 1767 points.

In preparation for the 2013 season, the signings of Vasil Kiryienka and David López García from Movistar Team and 2012 Italian national time trial champion, Dario Cataldo from Omega Pharma–Quick-Step were secured. The team also signed Gabriel Rasch, and on 1 October it was revealed that the team had also signed Joe Dombrowski and Ian Boswell from the Bontrager-Livestrong team as neo-pros. The year's Tour of Britain winner, Jonathan Tiernan-Locke had signed a two-year deal with the team.

At the end of the 2012 season, Cavendish moved to Omega Pharma–Quick-Step, Lars Petter Nordhaug moved to Blanco Pro Cycling, Davide Appollonio moved to Ag2r–La Mondiale, Juan Antonio Flecha moved to Vacansoleil–DCM, Alex Dowsett moved to Movistar Team, and Michael Rogers moved to Saxo Bank–Tinkoff Bank. Michael Barry and Jeremy Hunt both retired.

Doctor Geert Leinders, who had been employed by the Team since 2011, was subject of an internal investigation after allegations of involvement in doping at Blanco Pro Cycling earlier in his career, and on 9 October it was announced he would no longer work for the team. The impact of the USADA reasoned decision on doping by Lance Armstrong and teammates at the US Postal team led Sky to re-inforce its zero tolerance anti-doping policy, with all riders and staff being subjected to internal interviews. Two members of the coaching staff, Bobby Julich and Steven de Jongh were released from their contracts under the policy. Head Director Sportif Sean Yates also left the squad in October citing personal reasons, although the Telegraph linked his departure to past involvement in doping.

=== 2013: The second Tour de France victory ===
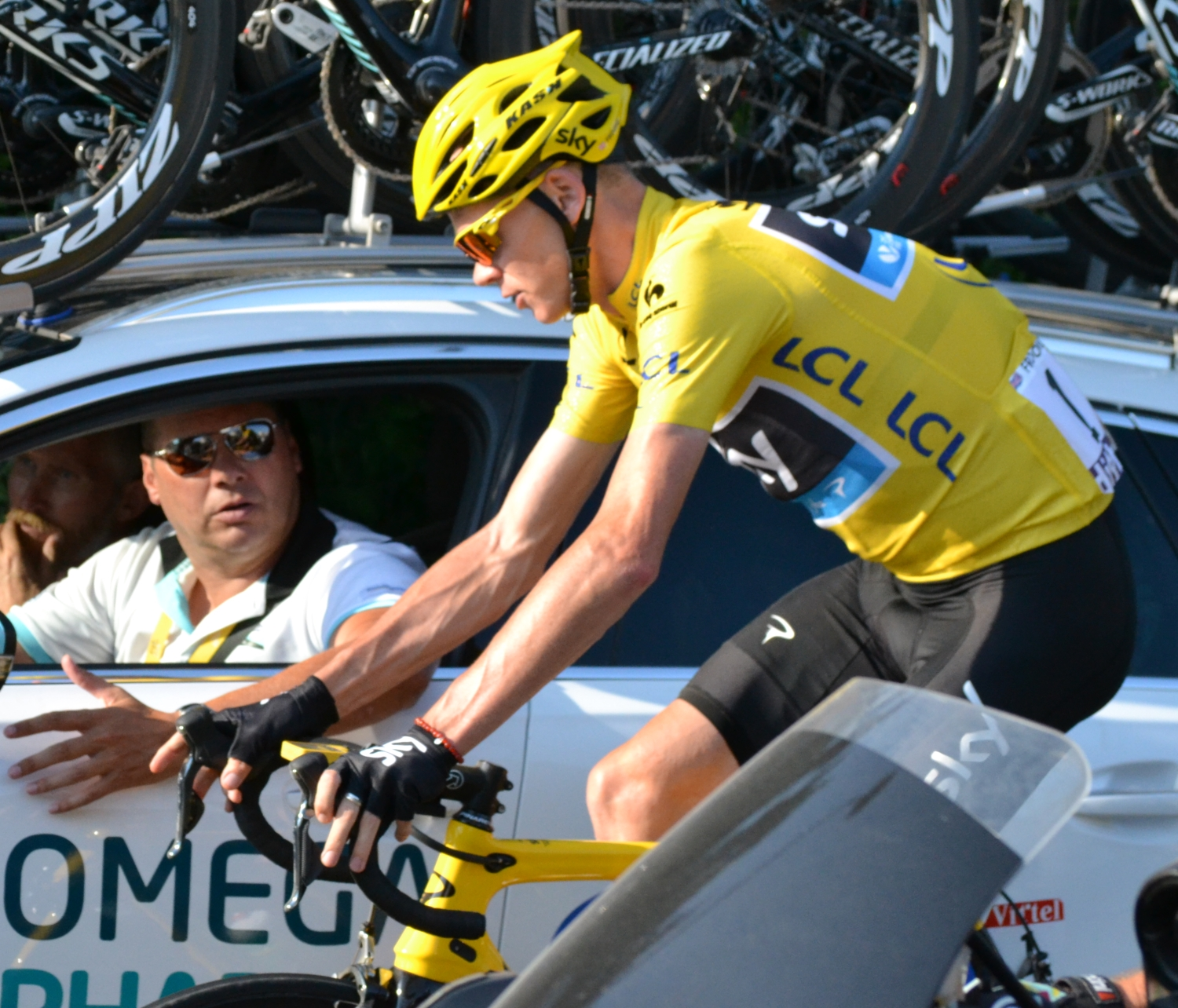
Chris Froome on his way to winning the 2013 Tour de France

The 2013 season began with the Tour Down Under, where Geraint Thomas won stage two and claimed the points classification. In February Froome won the overall classification, points classification and stage 5 Tour of Oman. In March Richie Porte won the Paris–Nice, including two of the last three stages in the race, the queen stage and the concluding time trial. Sergio Henao claimed his first victory for the team at the Volta ao Algarve, whilst Froome took a stage win at Tirreno–Adriatico. The team then picked up a one–two at the Critérium International with Froome securing victory with a win on the final stage and Porte finishing runner up with a victory in the stage two time trial, also securing the points competition.

After his victory in the 2012 Tour de France Bradley Wiggins built his early season around targeting the 2013 Giro d'Italia and supporting Froome in the Tour de France. The team took victory in the stage 2 team time trial, culminating in Salvatore Puccio taking over the pink jersey as leader of the general classification. Wiggins was hampered behind a crash on stage 7 and then himself crashed on stage 8. Wiggins abandoned the Giro due to a chest infection on stage 13.

Froome followed up with overall wins at the Tour de Romandie in April and Critérium du Dauphiné in June. Boasson Hagen retained his Tour of Norway title, winning the points classification and stage four of the race in the process. In July, Froome went on to win the 100th and 2013 edition of the Tour de France; claiming dominant stage victories on the stage eight final climb of Ax 3 Domaines, stage 15 to the summit of Mont Ventoux and the stage 17 individual time trial. Froome was narrowly beaten to the King of the Mountains prize by Movistar Teams Colombian climber and runner up, Nairo Quintana.

After the Tour de France, some of the team's key domestiques secured stage victories at the Eneco Tour (David Lopez), and Vuelta a España (Vasil Kiryienka). After the disappointment of the Giro, Wiggins returned with a renewed focus on the 2013 UCI Road World Championships Individual time trial event. As part of his build up he won the seventh stage time trial at the 2013 Tour de Pologne from Fabian Cancellara by a winning margin of 56 seconds. The team then recorded their first ever victory in their home stage race, with Wiggins claiming the overall title in the Tour of Britain winning the stage three time trial in Knowsley Safari park. Wiggins finished his season with second in the World time trial championships, finishing 46 seconds behind triple world champion, Tony Martin, with the team taking the bronze in the team time trial.

=== 2014: Tour failure and the rainbow jersey ===
On 4 June 2013 it was announced that Australian Nathan Earle of the Continental team, Huon Salmon–Genesys Wealth Advisers, had been signed by the team for the 2014 season. On 1 August 2013, the first day of the cycling transfer window, it was confirmed that Rigoberto Urán would move to Omega Pharma–Quick-Step for the 2014 season. On 22 August it was announced that Mathew Hayman would leave the team at the completion of the season and join Orica–GreenEDGE on a 2-year deal.

On 6 September it was announced that the Irishman Philip Deignan of UnitedHealthcare would be joining the team after a strong 2013 season. After heavy speculation at the road world championships it was announced on 1 October that Spanish climber, Mikel Nieve, would join the team on a two-year contract, following the closure of his current team (Euskaltel–Euskadi) at the end of the season. On 23 December Sebastián Henao (cousin of Team Sky rider Sergio Henao) was announced as the team's final signing for the 2014 season.

The 2014 season started off well. Froome defended and retained his Tour of Oman crown and Kennaugh won his first stage race, the Settimana Internazionale di Coppi e Bartali. Throughout the season, the team endured repeated illnesses and injuries. Geraint Thomas pulled out of the Paris–Nice after crashing out on stage seven whilst leading the general classification. Richie Porte abandoned the Tirreno–Adriatico and the Volta Ciclista a Catalunya, resulting in Porte not competing in the Giro d'Italia. A further blow came when Kennaugh pulled out of the Giro, with the team citing illness.

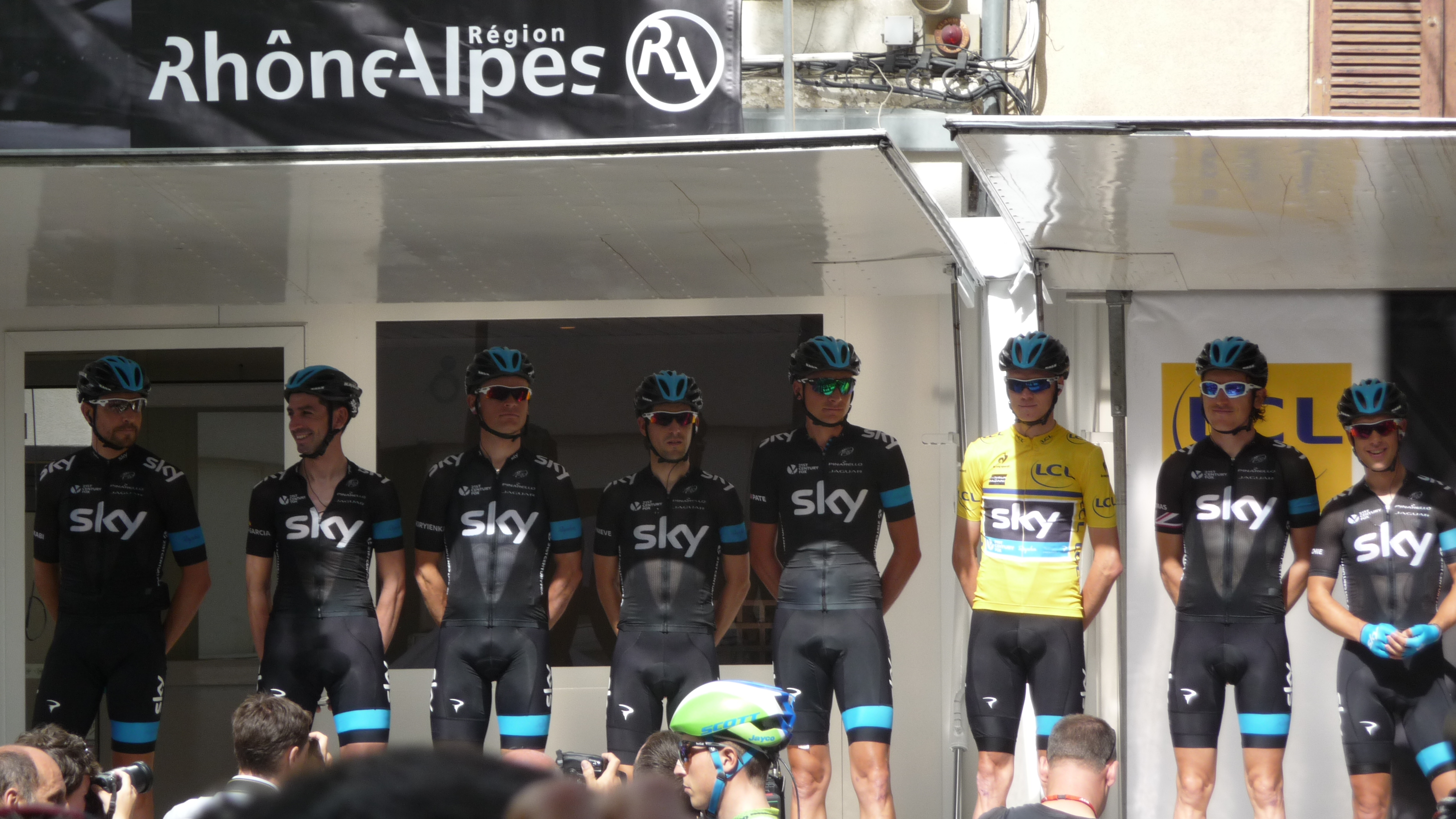
Chris Froome in the leaders jersey at the 2014 Critérium du Dauphiné

In April, the team's fortune began to turn; Froome defended and won the Tour de Romandie, Wiggins won the overall classification of the Tour of California and Geraint Thomas won overall classification of the Bayern-Rundfahrt – each taking control of the race by winning the individual time trial stage respectively. Poor luck returned at the Critérium du Dauphiné, where Froome crashed whilst wearing the leaders jersey, despite taking three stage wins (two stages for Froome, one for Nieve) Froome finished outside of the top 10, 4' 25" down on race winner Andrew Talansky.

In July, Froome returned to racing to defend his Tour de France victory, hopeful of overall victory. Froome crashed twice on stage four and abandoned the race, having also crashed the day before, with Xabier Zandio abandoning on the sixth stage of the race. As a result, Richie Porte inherited team leadership duties but lost time in both the Alpine and Pyrenean stages. The team's highest rider on general classification was Nieve in 18th position, 46 minutes 31 seconds behind the winner, Vincenzo Nibali this marked one of the worst performances of the team at the Tour de France. Not selected to ride the Tour, Kennaugh went on to take his second overall race victory at the Tour of Austria, taking the points classification in the process.

After abandoning the Tour de France, Froome announced he would ride the 2014 Vuelta a España where he finished in second position, finishing one minute ten seconds, behind the winner Alberto Contador. Froome was awarded the overall combativity award for the entire race.

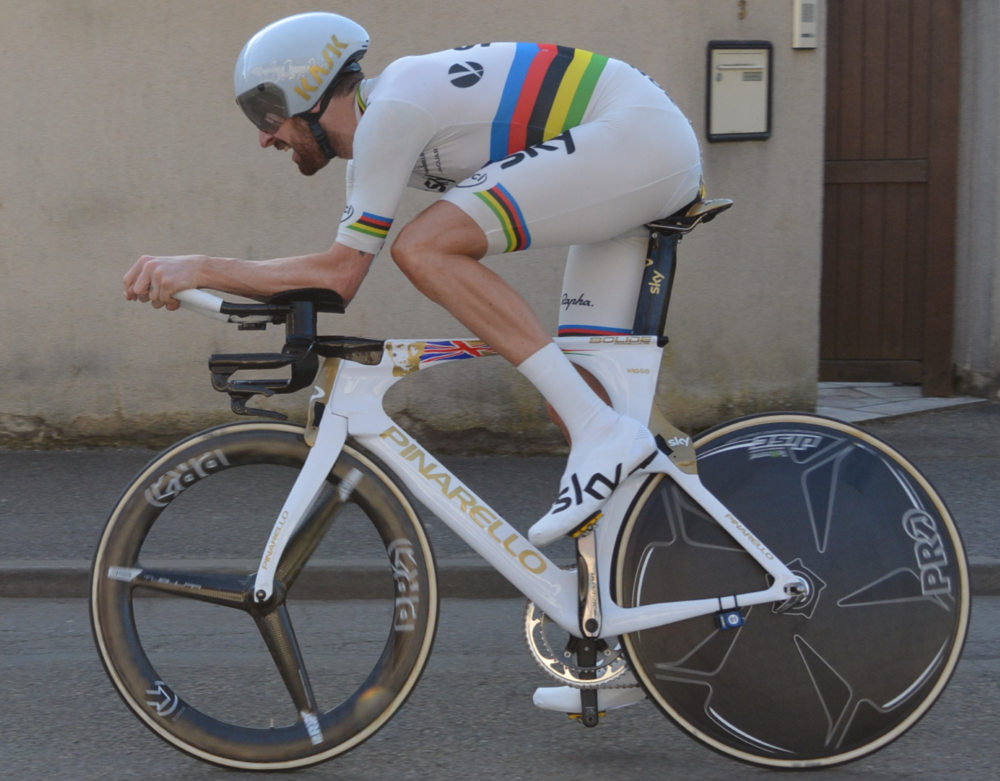
Bradley Wiggins wearing the rainbow skinsuit at the 2015 Paris–Nice

In September, Wiggins returned to the Tour of Britain with the stated aim of defending his title. He finished third overall, winning the final day time trial by eight seconds from Sylvain Chavanel. Wiggins returned to action later in September at the road world championships, again with the aim of winning the time trial event. Wiggins won the time trial by over 25 seconds from perennial opponent, Tony Martin. Wiggins won Team Sky's first ever rainbow jersey.

On 28 July 2014, the team announced that Thomas had signed a two-year contract extension, keeping him at the team until the end of the 2016 season. In September Swift signed a two-year contract extension. On 13 August 2014, Cyclingnews.com reported that Edvald Boasson Hagen would not renew his contract and would leave the team at the end of the season. After the cycling World Championships, Sky announced that they had signed Leopold König, Nicolas Roche, Wout Poels, and Andrew Fenn, with Lars Petter Nordhaug rejoining the team after two years at Belkin.

On 1 October 2014, it was announced that Dario Cataldo would leave the team at the end of the season to join Astana. On 24 October, the team announced the signing of their sixth rider, Elia Viviani. American climber Joe Dombrowski also left Team Sky to join Cannondale–Garmin. On 5 January 2015, Wiggins signed a contract extension with the team up until and including the 2015 Paris–Roubaix.

=== 2015: The Third Tour de France and another World Championship ===
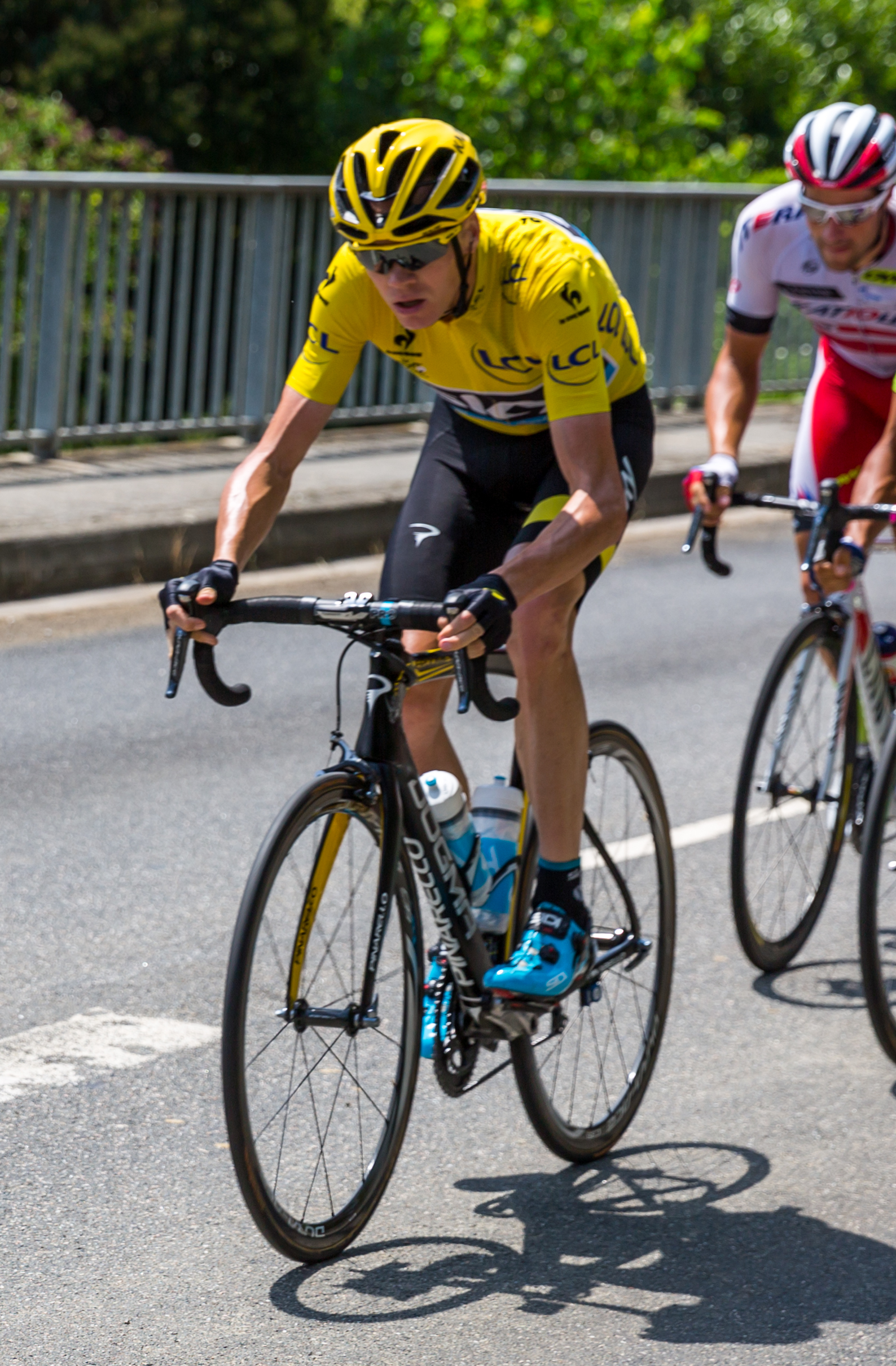
Froome in the leaders jersey on stage thirteen of the 2015 Tour de France

On 8 January, Richie Porte scored the team's first victory of the season by winning the Australian National Time Trial championships and went on to record the team's first stage win at the Tour Down Under. Elia Viviani scored his first win for the team, taking sprint victory on stage two of the Dubai Tour.

In February the team dominated the Vuelta a Andalucía and Volta ao Algarve with both Froome and Thomas taking both overall wins respectively. At the end of February Stannard scored the team second classic, taking a second successive victory at Omloop Het Nieuwsblad. The victory was made more impressive as Stannard made the four-man selection with three Etixx–Quick-Step riders; Boonen, Terpstra and Vandenbergh.

The team's next victory came at Paris–Nice where Porte led a team one-two (along with Thomas) at the summit finish of Croix de Chaubouret. Porte won the stage 7 time trial to the summit of Col d'Èze. In the same week, Wout Poels recorded his first win for the team when he secured victory on the fifth stage of Tirreno–Adriatico to Castelraimondo.

In late March, Thomas emerged victorious in E3 Harelbeke after attacking his co-breakaway companions, Zdeněk Štybar and Peter Sagan, and soloing to victory. Ben Swift then won the second stage of Settimana Internazionale di Coppi e Bartali the same day and Richie Porte moved into the lead and eventually won the Volta a Catalunya Victory in Catalunya represented Porte's second overall win of the season and the fourth for the team.

In April, Bradley Wiggins won his final time trial for the team at the Three Days of De Panne. Later in the same week, Bradley Wiggins retired from the team and joined his own WIGGINS team, allowing him to focus on the 2016 Olympic Games. In late April Porte won the Giro del Trentino taking a decisive stage victory on the queen stage summit finish to Brentonico. The team then rounded off a successful April by taking victory in the Team Time Trial at the Tour de Romandie, placing Geraint Thomas in the yellow leaders jersey whilst new signing Wout Poels underwent surgery on a broken shoulder bone courtesy of his crash at La Flèche Wallonne.

The team began May with success; Lars Petter Nordhaug took the opening stage win at the inaugural Tour de Yorkshire, whilst Ben Swift crashed out later requiring surgery.

The team entered the 2015 Giro d'Italia with Porte as team leader with the aim of winning the general classification. After limiting the time loss in the stage 1 team time trial Elia Viviani secured the first win for the team in a Grand Tour since the 2013 Vuelta a España on stage 2, also taking over the Maglia rossa. On stage 10 Porte lost 47 seconds, docked two minutes fine for accepting outside intervention, resulting in Porte dropping down to 12th on the general classification. Porte lost more time on the uphill finish on stage 12, a further two minutes on stage 13, and 27 minutes on stage 15. He then abandoned on the second rest day.

Chris Froome returned to action at the Critérium du Dauphiné, as part of his build up for the Tour de France, and the team won three stages and took the overall title for the fourth time. Peter Kennaugh opened the team's account taking the victory on stage one, just in front of the bunch sprint finish. Froome went on to dominate the final two summit finish stages, taking victory at Montée du Bettex (stage 7) and Modane Valfréjus (stage 8) giving him a lead of 10 seconds over Tejay van Garderen.

The team went into the 2015 Tour de France with their "strongest team ever" After a strong performance on the Mur de Huy Froome took over the race lead, and general classification by one second over Tony Martin. As the Tour entered the second week of racing stage 10 saw the first mountains stage, the summit finish of La Pierre-Saint-Martin, where Froome went on to take the stage win, putting significant time into his general classification rivals. During the remainder of the race the team faced intense scrutiny regarding their dominant performances; Porte was punched in the ribs by a spectator in the Pyrenees, and Froome had urine thrown at him by another spectator.

On the first rest of the Tour de France, Porte confirmed he would leave the team at the end of the season. This would later, in August, be confirmed to be CCC Pro Team. The team signed Alex Peters and Tao Geoghegan Hart as stagiares for the remainder of the season, with the former also signing for two years. In September, Mikel Landa confirmed his move to the team for the 2016 season, with Mikel Nieve also signing a two-year extension with the team. Later, in the same month the team then signed their second neo-pro, Gianni Moscon, Michał Gołaś, Danny van Poppel, Beñat Intxausti and the 2014 World Road Race champion Michał Kwiatkowski.

On 28 September the team confirmed that Nathan Earle, Bernhard Eisel, Danny Pate, Richie Porte, Kanstantsin Siutsou and Chris Sutton would be leaving the team. The team also confirmed that Ian Boswell, Philip Deignan, Sebastián Henao, Peter Kennaugh, Vasil Kiryienka, Christian Knees, Mikel Nieve, Luke Rowe, Ian Stannard and Xabier Zandio would be staying after signing new contract extensions.

Later in September Sky retained the World Time Trial Championships in Richmond when Vasil Kiryienka won by nine seconds from Adriano Malori.

=== 2016: First Monument win and the fourth Tour victory ===
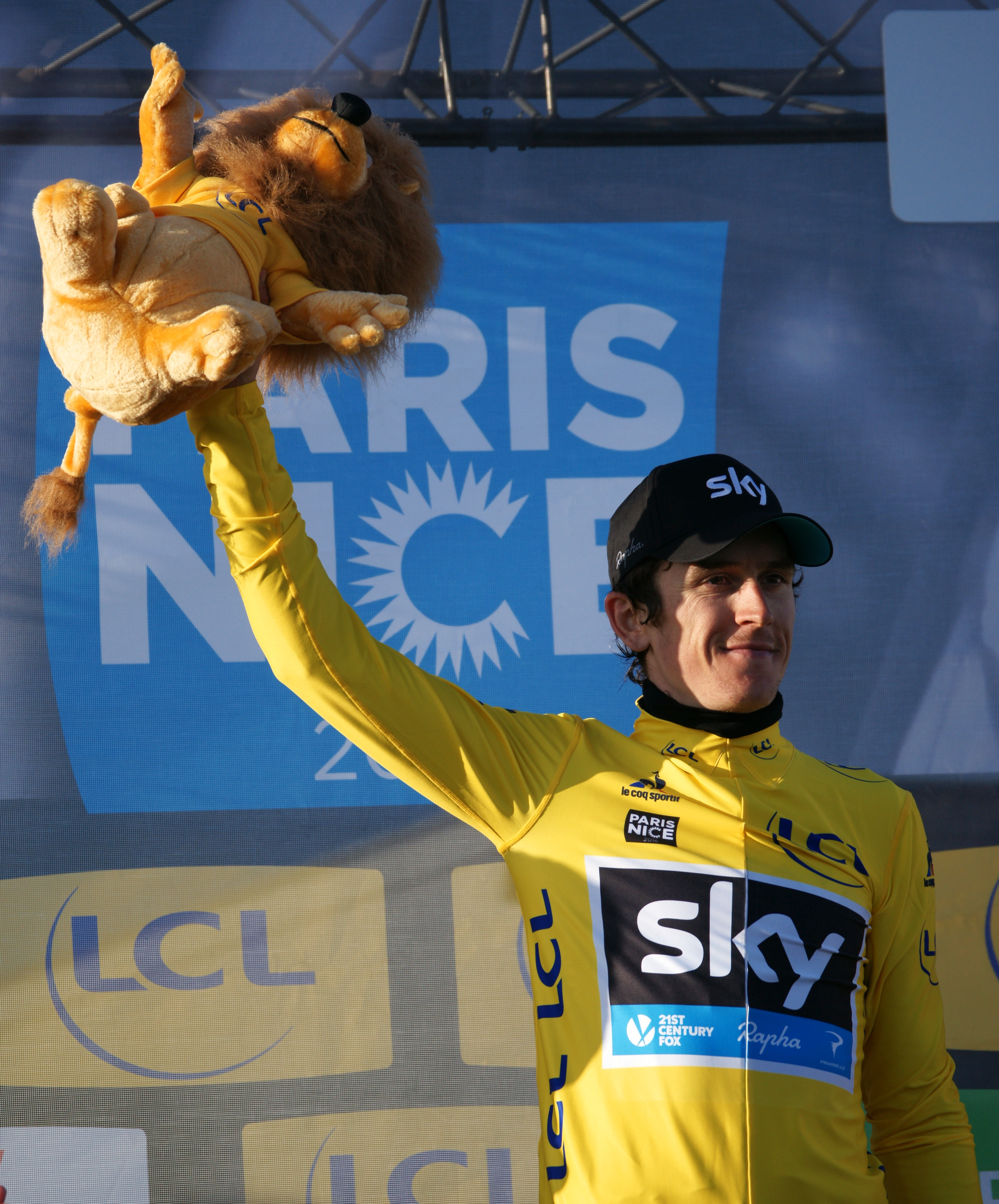
Geraint Thomas at the 2016 Paris–Nice, where he would claim the team's fourth overall win in the past five seasons.

With Chris Froome delaying the start of his season a number of key deluxe-domestiques were afforded opportunities to aim for race victories at the start of the season. Peter Kennaugh took the team's first one-day race win at the second Cadel Evans Great Ocean Road Race, whilst Wout Poels claimed his first overall GC victory at the Volta a la Comunitat Valenciana, in the process taking two stages, the mountains and the points classifications. Froome returned towards the end of the Australian cycling season to claim the team's first ever GC win at the Herald Sun Tour. Geraint Thomas enjoyed a successful start to his 2016 campaign, notching up overall victories at Volta ao Algarve (for the second successive year) and Paris–Nice. Thomas' victory in the French stage race means that Sky have won four of the past five editions.

Sky entered the spring classics campaign with the perennial aim of claiming their first monument race. New recruit, Michał Kwiatkowski, took his first victory for the team in the E3 Harelbeke semi-classic. As the classics campaign progressed the team showed great consistency, but fell short of their goal again, taking second in Milan–San Remo, fifth at the Tour of Flanders and third at Paris–Roubaix. Upon entering the Ardennes classics the team pinned their hopes on Kwiatkowski at La Flèche Wallonne, to no avail. Entering the final monument of the spring, Liège–Bastogne–Liège, the team again led with Kwiatkowski. Sky finally achieved their coveted monument win, but it wasn't Kwiatkowski, but rather, domestique Wout Poels who emerged victorious on a day with poor weather conditions and enduring snow.

New recruit Mikel Landa claimed his first overall win for team – taking the GC at the 2016 Giro del Trentino only a week after claiming his first stage win for the team. Landa's stated aim for the first half of the season is the Giro d'Italia. Froome added to Sky's race win total by successfully defending his Critérium du Dauphiné title after taking the overall lead with a victory on stage 5 to Vaujany, becoming the fifth rider to win the overall title three times.

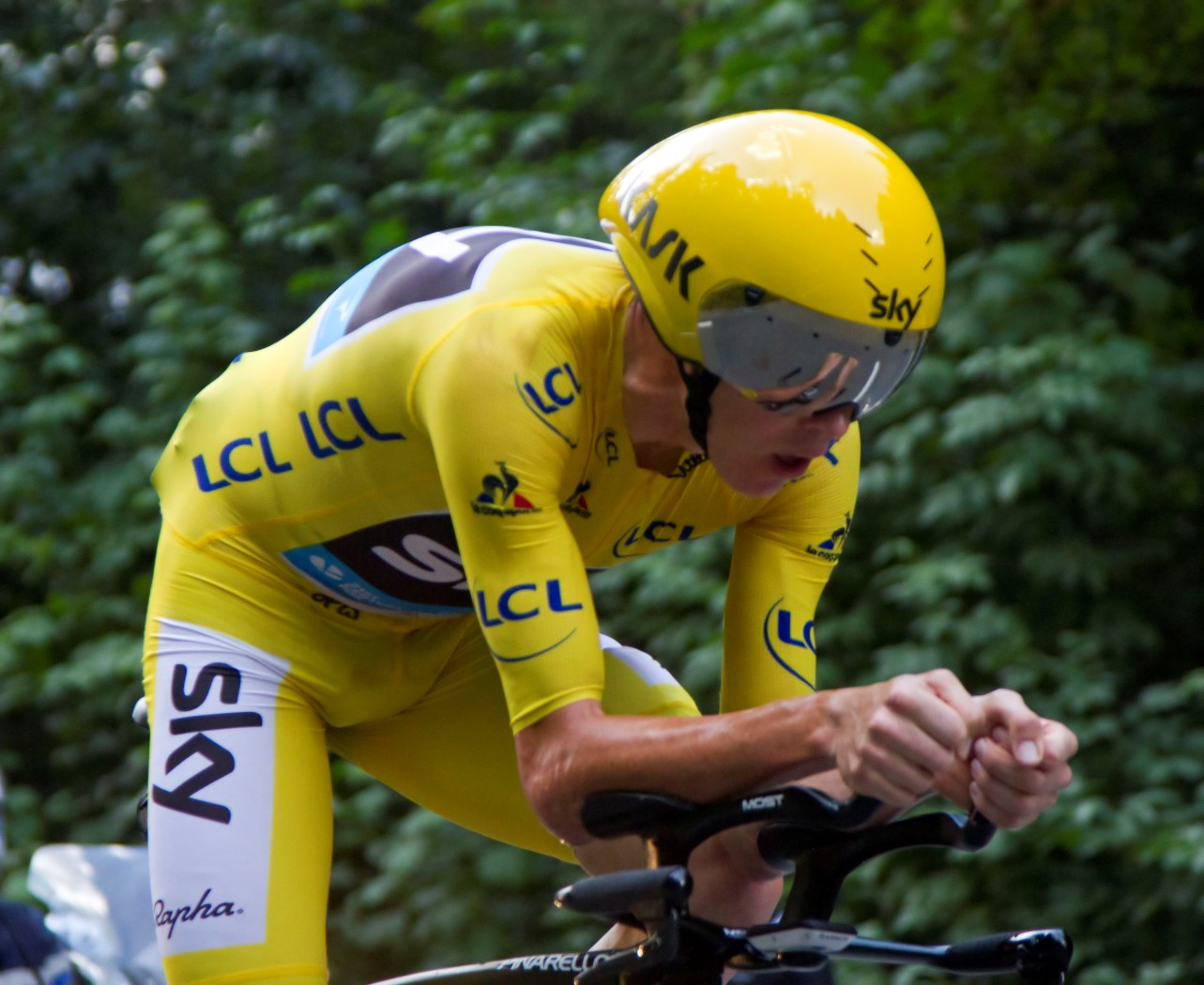
Chris Froome during a time trial on his way to victory at the 2016 Tour de France

The team went into the 2016 Tour de France with what was without question an even stronger squad than the previous year. A week into the race on stage 8, Froome took many by surprise by attacking on the descent of the Col de Peyresourde which caught his main rivals off guard, resulting in a solo victory into Bagnères-de-Luchon to take the yellow jersey. On stage 11 to Montpellier in crosswinds, he gained more time as part of a 4-man breakaway in the final 12 kilometres of the stage alongside green jersey wearer Peter Sagan, Sagan's Tinkoff teammate Maciej Bodnar, and Froome's own teammate Geraint Thomas, placing second to Sagan in a sprint finish.

On stage 12 to Mont Ventoux, which was shortened to Chalet Reynard due to high winds, Froome was involved in a crash involving a stopped motorbike that also sent Richie Porte and Bauke Mollema down. With no usable bike, Froome had no choice but to run partway up the mountain until he was able to get a spare bike from his team car. Provisionally he had fallen to sixth place overall which would have given the yellow jersey to Adam Yates, however race officials decided to give him and Porte the same time as Mollema, ensuring Froome would hold on to his first overall position.

Superb performances in both the individual time trials (second on stage 13 to La Caverne du Pont-d'Arc and winner of stage 18 to Megève) allowed Froome to gain even more time on his rivals, and despite a crash on stage 19 to Saint-Gervais-les-Bains where he finished the stage on Thomas' bike with support from Wout Poels, it was enough for him to win the race overall 4:05 ahead of second-placed Romain Bardet, becoming the first British rider to win the Tour on three occasions, the fourth rider to become a 3-time winner (joining Philippe Thys, Louison Bobet and Greg LeMond), and the first since Miguel Induráin in 1995 to successfully defend his title. It was also the first time the team finished a Grand Tour with all nine riders intact.

Sky started off their 2016 Vuelta a España campaign in late August by winning the team time trial on stage 1 and holding the red jersey for 2 days before surrendering it on stage 3, where Chris Froome took a 4th-place finish at Mirador de Ézaro to elevate himself into third place in the overall standings. He then got the victory on stage 11 at Peña Cabarga, the very same mountain where he got his first-ever Grand Tour stage win in 2011, and put himself into second overall just under a minute behind race leader Nairo Quintana.

A series of early attacks by Quntana and Alberto Contador on stage 15 to Aramon Formigal blew the race apart, causing Froome to be isolated from his teammates and to lose more than 2 1/2 minutes on his rival. He gained most of that time back on the stage 19 time trial to Calp with a dominant performance, but was unable to make up the difference in the penultimate stage, finishing second overall in the end by just 1:23 behind Quintana. It was Froome's second Grand Tour podium following his win at the Tour de France, and just coming off of winning the bronze medal in the time trial at the Olympic Games in Rio.

In August 2016 the news broke that the team had signed Olympic Team Pursuit champion, Owain Doull from WIGGINS and Tao Geoghegan Hart from Axeon–Hagens Berman Later, in the same month, the team confirmed their third signing of the season – Polish rider Łukasz Wiśniowski from Etixx–Quick-Step. For the 2017 season Nicolas Roche will leave for BMC Racing Team, as well as Andy Fenn, Lars Petter Nordhaug (both to new Irish team Aqua Blue Sport) and Leopold König (to Bora–Hansgrohe). Luke Rowe, Chris Froome, Christian Knees, Salvatore Puccio and Geraint Thomas have renewed with the team.

In September the team announced the signing of Kenny Elissonde from Groupama–FDJ United on a two-year deal. On 30 September, Wout Poels signed a three-year contract extension with the team. Elia Viviani signed a new 2-year deal on 26 October. The team announced on 27 October that it had signed Diego Rosa from XDS Astana Team on a 3-year deal, and on 8 November announced the signing of Doull's WIGGINS teammate Jonathan Dibben.

The team finished the 2016 season 3rd overall in the UCI World Tour team rankings, with Froome as its highest-ranked rider, finishing 3rd overall in the individual rider ranking.

=== 2017: The Grand Tour double and Milan–San Remo ===
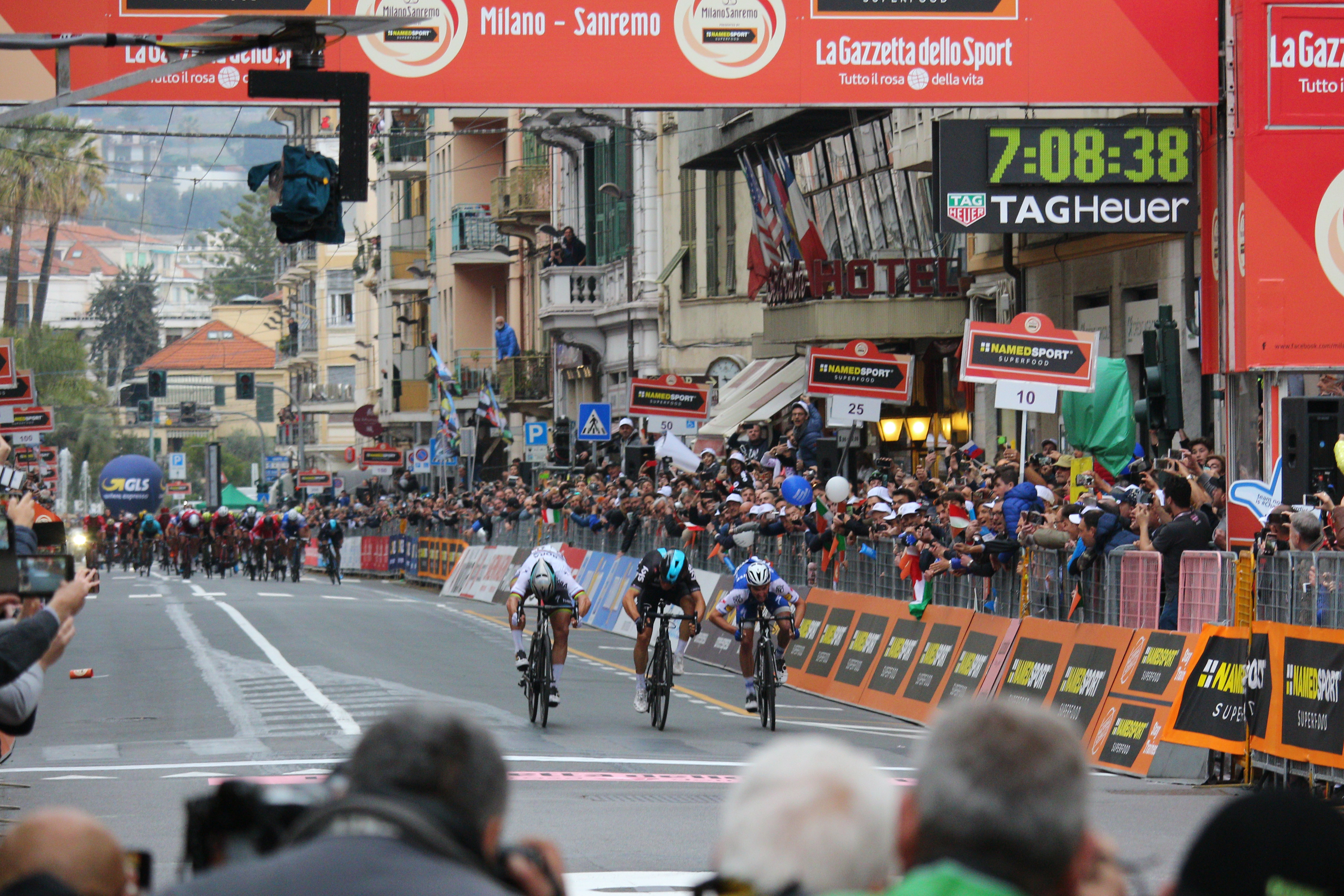
Michał Kwiatkowski winning the sprint at the 2017 Milan–San Remo

Sky started the 2017 season with three stage wins at the Herald Sun Tour as well as winning the teams classification, with new team member Kenny Elissonde finishing on the podium in 3rd place and Chris Froome finishing sixth overall. The team's first race win of the season came at Strade Bianche when Michał Kwiatkowski took a solo victory after attacking 15 kilometres from the finish. Geraint Thomas took a stage win at Tirreno–Adriatico and held the leader's jersey for one day, also taking the overall victory and one stage win at the Tour of the Alps.

Sky won Paris–Nice for the fifth time in sixth years courtesy of Sergio Henao, who won the race overall by just two seconds over Alberto Contador. Kwiatkowski added to Sky's win total by winning Milan–San Remo in a three-up sprint, giving the team its second Monument win. Neo-pro Jonathan Dibben won the individual time trial stage at the Tour of California, the team winning the team classification with Tao Geoghegan Hart and Ian Boswell placing in the final top ten overall.

Thomas and Mikel Landa were appointed the team's joint leaders for the Giro d'Italia. At one point in the race, Thomas was sitting second in the general classification, however on the 9th stage to Blockhaus a fair chunk of the peloton was involved in a crash involving a stopped motorbike, which took down Thomas, Landa and most of the other members of the team. Thomas attempted a comeback after placing second in the following day's time trial, but the extent of his injuries were as such that he abandoned the race prior to stage 11. Landa continued as sole leader, taking several top-3 finishes on several mountain stages before winning stage 19 to Piancavallo. He went on to win the mountains classification and the super-combativity prize, also winning the Cima Coppi for being the first to cross the summit of the Stelvio Pass on stage 16.

The team then participated in the inaugural Hammer Series, a three-day event pitting teams against each other in various skills competitions. Impressive performances by Tao Geoghegan Hart in the climbing event and Elia Viviani in the sprint event gave the team enough points to take the overall lead. In the team time trial-style Chase event, they held on by one second over Team Sunweb to win the entire competition. Froome returned to action at the Critérium du Dauphiné and finished fourth overall, just one second off the podium. Teammate Peter Kennaugh won the penultimate stage at Alpe d'Huez.

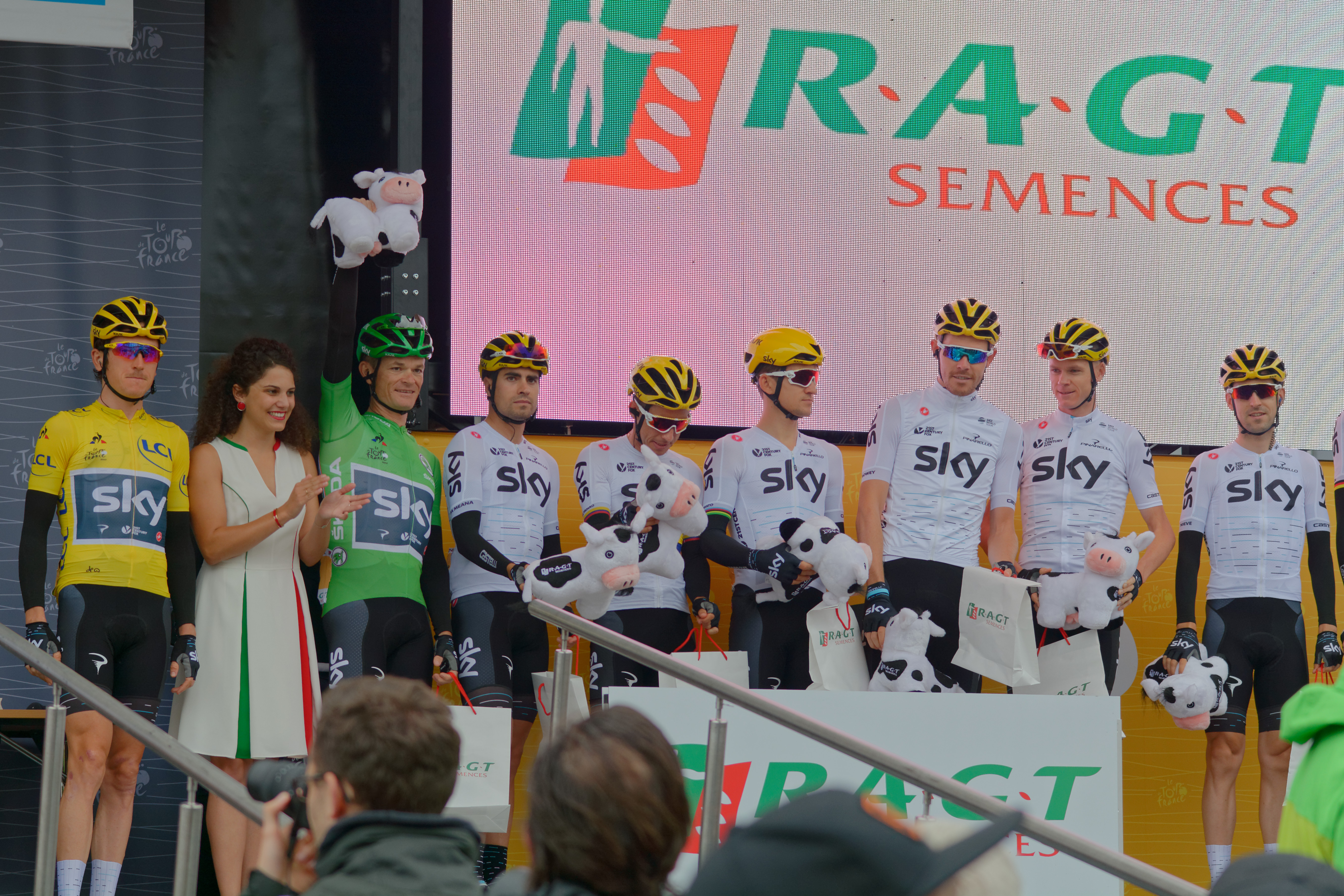
Team Sky prior to stage 2 of the 2017 Tour de France as leaders of the team classification

The team then went into the 2017 Tour de France with yet another strong lineup and the goal to help Froome achieve his fourth overall victory. In the opening prologue stage in Düsseldorf the team placed four riders within the top eight led by Geraint Thomas, who became the first Welsh rider to wear the yellow jersey. He was followed by Vasil Kiryienka in third, Froome in 6th and Kwiatkowski in eighth – Froome putting between 35 seconds and nearly a minute into most of his general classification rivals. On stage five to La Planche des Belles Filles, Froome took third place behind stage winner Fabio Aru, moving him into yellow and Thomas to second place.

The 1–2 placing on GC held until stage nine to Chambéry, when Thomas was involved in a crash on the descent of the Col de la Biche and had to abandon the race with a fractured collarbone. On stage 12 to Peyragudes, Froome cracked within the final kilometre, ceding 22 seconds and the yellow jersey to Aru. On the final approach on stage 14 to Rodez the team stretched out the peloton, splitting it into several groups due to crosswinds allowing Froome to put 25 seconds into Aru, enough to retake yellow by a margin of 18 seconds overall.

On stage 15 to Le Puy-en-Velay, Froome ran into mechanical trouble on the ascent of the Col de Peyra Taillade and was distanced by more than 40 seconds thanks to a brutal acceleration by the AG2R La Mondiale team. With the help of his teammates he managed to make it back to the main group of GC contenders to keep his overall lead intact. Froome and Landa performed strongly in the Alpine stages to Serre Chevalier and Izoard, helping Landa move into fourth overall.

In the final time trial in Marseille, Froome's strength in the discipline helped him put nearly two minutes into Romain Bardet and 25 seconds into Rigoberto Urán, finishing third on the stage six seconds behind stage winner Maciej Bodnar and 5 seconds behind second-place Kwiatkowski. Froome secured his fourth Tour victory and third consecutively, putting him one win away from joining the likes of Anquétil, Indurain, Merckx and Hinault. He became the 7th man to win the Tour overall without winning a stage, however he did amass ten top-ten finishes. Sky won the team classification for the first time in their history, leading from start to finish.

A week after the end of the Tour de France, Kwiatkowski continued his strong rides in the one-day classics by winning the Clásica de San Sebastián, and on 8 August signed a three-year contract extension. After months of recovery following his injury, Wout Poels returned to form by winning the final stage of the Tour de Pologne and finishing third overall, with teammate Diego Rosa taking the mountains classification. Landa followed up his performance in the Tour with overall victory in the Vuelta a Burgos, also winning two stages, the mountains classification and the points classification.

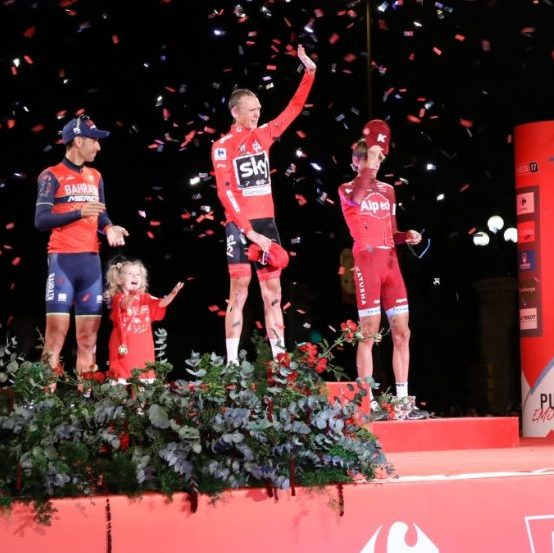
Chris Froome (centre) on the podium after winning the 2017 Vuelta a España

The team sent its strongest-ever squad to the Vuelta a España, with Froome on a mission to finally win the race that had eluded him on multiple occasions. After a 4th-place finish in the opening team time trial in Nîmes, Froome took third place on the third stage at Andorra behind Vincenzo Nibali. Combined with bonus seconds picked up from the stage's intermediate sprint, it was enough to move him into the overall race lead, collecting his first red jersey since stage 10 in 2011. Several days later, he took his first stage win of his season at Cumbre del Sol, which moved him into the lead in the points classification, followed by a second-place finish at Calar Alto on stage 11.

The following day to Antequera, Froome crashed twice after a mechanical, but managed to limit his time losses with the help of his teammates and bounced back on the next 3 stages with consecutive top-10 finishes and regained the points lead after stage 15. Froome then dominated the stage 16 individual time trial to Logroño, extending his lead to nearly 2 minutes ahead of Nibali. He struggled on the steep slopes to Los Machucos the next day, dropping about 40 seconds to Nibali. He regained half that loss on stage 18, and cemented the overall lead as well as the combination classification with a third-place finish at Alto de l'Angliru behind Alberto Contador on stage 20.

In a bunch sprint finish on the final stage in Madrid, he held on to the points classification by two points over Matteo Trentin. With the victory, Froome became the first British rider to win the Vuelta, the third man to complete the Tour-Vuelta double in the same year (joining Jacques Anquetil and Bernard Hinault), and the first to complete the feat in the modern era since the Vuelta moved to its current August–September time period. A week after the Vuelta victory, the team won the bronze medal in the team time trial at the 2017 UCI Road World Championships in Bergen.

On 30 June, the eve of the Tour de France Grand Départ, Froome signed a 2-year contract extension with the team. The team announced the signings of Jonathan Castroviejo (Movistar Team) and David de la Cruz (Quick-Step Floors) for the 2018 season. On 27 August 2017, the team also announced the signing of 2017 Tour de l'Avenir winner Egan Bernal (Androni–Sidermec–Bottecchia). A day later, they announced the signings of reigning Under 23 Road Race World Champion Kristoffer Halvorsen (Joker Icopal) and 2017 Girobio overall winner Pavel Sivakov (BMC Development Team),

On 1 September, it was revealed that 2017 British Under-23 road race champion Chris Lawless had been signed from Axeon–Hagens Berman. Dylan van Baarle (Cannondale–Drapac) was signed on 18 September 2017. On 5 December 2017, the team announced that they had signed Leonardo Basso, a stagaire with Trek–Segafredo. Whilst Mikel Landa transferred to Movistar, Mikel Nieve to Mitchelton–Scott, Peter Kennaugh to Bora–Hansgrohe and Ian Boswell to Team Katusha–Alpecin. Elia Viviani ended his contract a year early to join QuickStep for the 2018 and 2019 seasons. Christian Knees, Michał Gołaś, Sebastián Henao, Phil Deignan, David Lopez and Ian Stannard all signed multi-year contract extensions.

The team finished the 2017 season on top of the UCI World Tour team ranking for the first time since 2012. Chris Froome was the highest-ranked rider in the individual rankings, placing second.

=== 2018: Grand Tour domination ===
The team's first victory of the year came via highly regarded new recruit, Egan Bernal claiming victory in the Colombian national time trial championships. Teammate Sergio Henao would also claim victory in the national road race championships leading to a clean sweep of national titles. Bernal continued his strong early season form, claiming overall victory at the Colombia Oro y Paz. As the European stage racing season kicked-off Wout Poels and David de la Cruz claimed victories at Vuelta a Andalucía. Michał Kwiatkowski and Geraint Thomas claimed a one–two victory at Volta ao Algarve. Poels and de la Cruz continued their strong form, claiming stage victories at Paris–Nice, whilst Kwiatkowski claimed a second overall general classification victory, winning Tirreno–Adriatico – the team's first victory at the race.

In the lead up to the first Grand Tour of the year, the 2018 Giro d'Italia, Diego Rosa emerged victorious at Settimana Internazionale di Coppi e Bartali, claiming his first overall win for the team. New recruits Chris Lawless and Pavel Sivakov claimed their first classification victories for the team, with Lawless also winning a stage of the race. Bernal had been en route to claim second place at his first World Tour event of the year, Volta a Catalunya, however a late crash on the final stage of the race saw Bernal abandon. Bernal next raced at the Tour de Romandie where he won the stage three time trial and with it, the young rider classification. Moving on to the 2018 Tour of California, Bernal lead the team's general classification ambitions, resulting in his first World Tour stage race victory, claiming two stages as well.

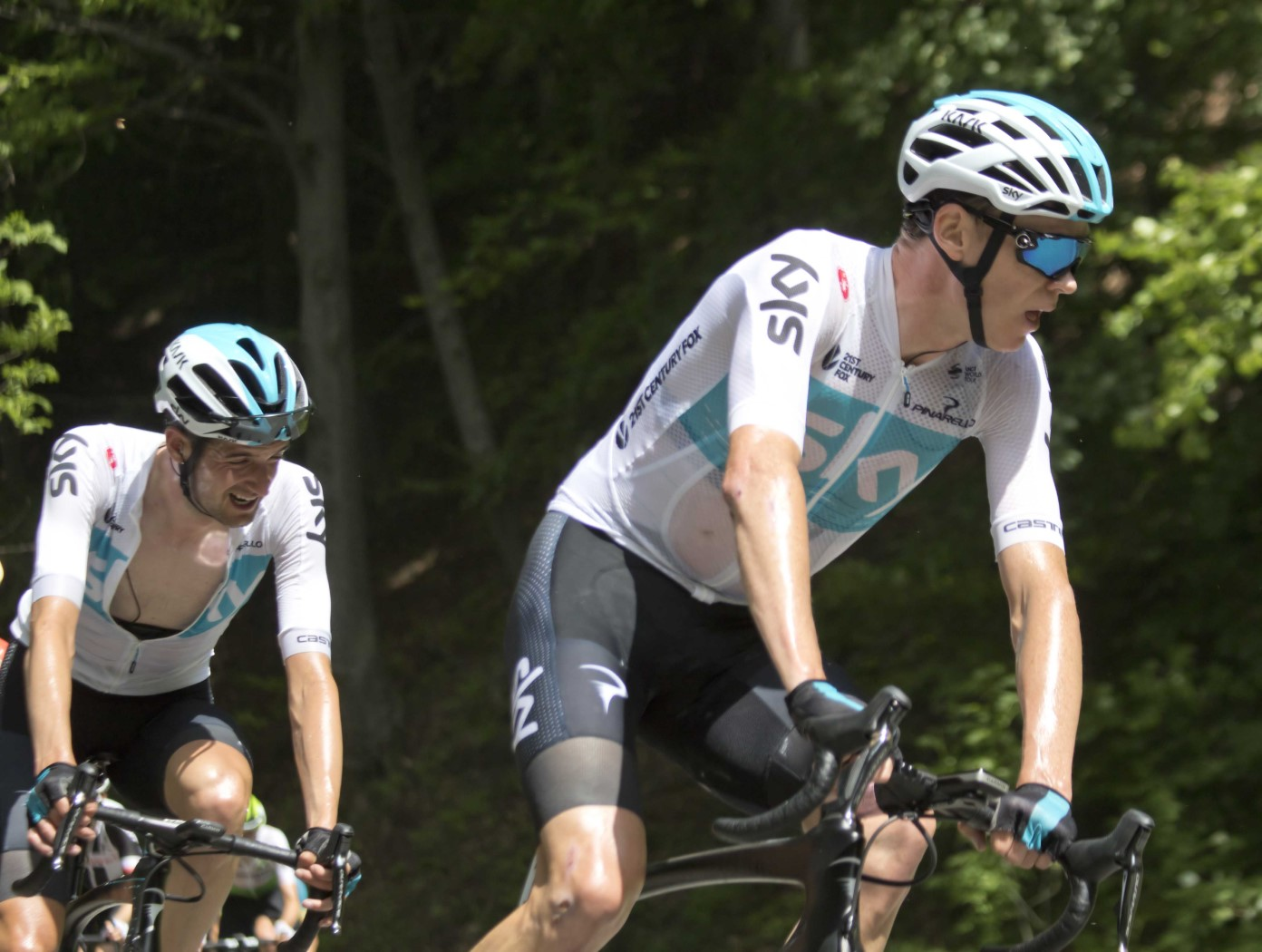
Chris Froome (right) shortly before his decisive attack during the 2018 Giro d'Italia

Chris Froome entered the Giro d'Italia as favourite to win the overall race. As the current champion of both the Tour de France and Vuelta a España, Froome had the opportunity to join an elite group of riders who concurrently held all Grand Tour titles. The Giro started in Israel for the first time. Before the race began, Froome crashed during a recon of the first stage time trial route. Froome ceded over 30 seconds to main race rival, Tom Dumoulin as well as 20 seconds to Simon Yates. As the race returned to Italian land, Froome found himself over 50 seconds down on the maglia rosa – Rohan Dennis. By the end of stage six, the races first summit finish at the top of Mount Etna Froome had moved up to eighth position overall, but had lost over a minute to new race leader, Yates.

By the end of the eighth stage and third mountain-top finish at Gran Sasso d'Italia, Froome trailed Yates by nearly two and a half minutes, with general classification hopes looking all but impossible. Froome's domestiques, Poels and Sergio Henao, were 18th and 25th overall 3' 14" and 5' 56" behind the race leader. By the end of stage 13, Froome had slipped back to 12th overall 3' 20" behind race leader, Yates. Stage 14 saw the riders face the fearsome climb of Monte Zoncolan, with gradients reaching nearly 20%. Froome attacked the main selection of favourites, winning the stage from Yates.

Froome's improved form was not maintained into stage 15, with Yates claiming the victory on the medium-mountain stage by a margin of 41 seconds over everyone else. Yates' lead in the race grew to 2' 11" over Dumoulin and 4' 52" over Froome – who was now sat in seventh place overall. The time trial on stage 16, from Trento to Rovereto, had been a focus-point for Froome, hoping to claw back significant amounts of time over Yates' by virtue of his stronger time-trialling ability. Froome cut the deficit to 3' 50" by the end of the stage, having taken back over a minute from Yates.

Deep into the third week of the race, stage 18 saw the first sign of weakness from Yates, cracking on the final climb of the day to Prato Nevoso, with the deficit to Dumoulin in second cut to 28 seconds and 3' 22" to Froome. Stage 19 of the 2018-edition of the race had been designated as the races' queen stage. Starting in Venaria Reale, the stage climbed over a trio of mountains; the part-gravel Colle delle Finestre, with the climb to Sestriere ending at Bardonecchia. Yates' poor form continued into stage 19, culminating in him being dropped by the peloton on the lower slopes of the Finestre, promoting Domoulin to virtual race leader.

With over 80 kilometres remaining in the stage Froome attacked the peloton on the gravel section of the Finestre, pulling away from the main group of favourites. This attack continued over the subsequent two climbs with Froome ultimately winning the stage by three minutes from second place Richard Carapaz, but importantly by over 3' 20" from Dumoulin. Froome was now leading the race overall by 40 seconds from Dumoulin with two stages remaining. Froome maintained his race lead, becoming the fifth rider to simultaneously hold all three grand tour titles. Froome won the mountains classification largely due to his stage 19 exploits, and Team Sky won the overall team classification.

As the cycling season entered the European summer, the build to the 2018 Tour de France had begun. Geraint Thomas claimed overall victory at the Critérium du Dauphiné improving his chances of being promoted to team-leader for the Tour de France. The team scored a number of national title victories: Jonathan Castroviejo won the Spanish time trial title, Kwiatkowski the Polish road race, Dylan van Baarle the Dutch time trial, Thomas the British time trial and Vasil Kiryienka the Belarusian time trial.

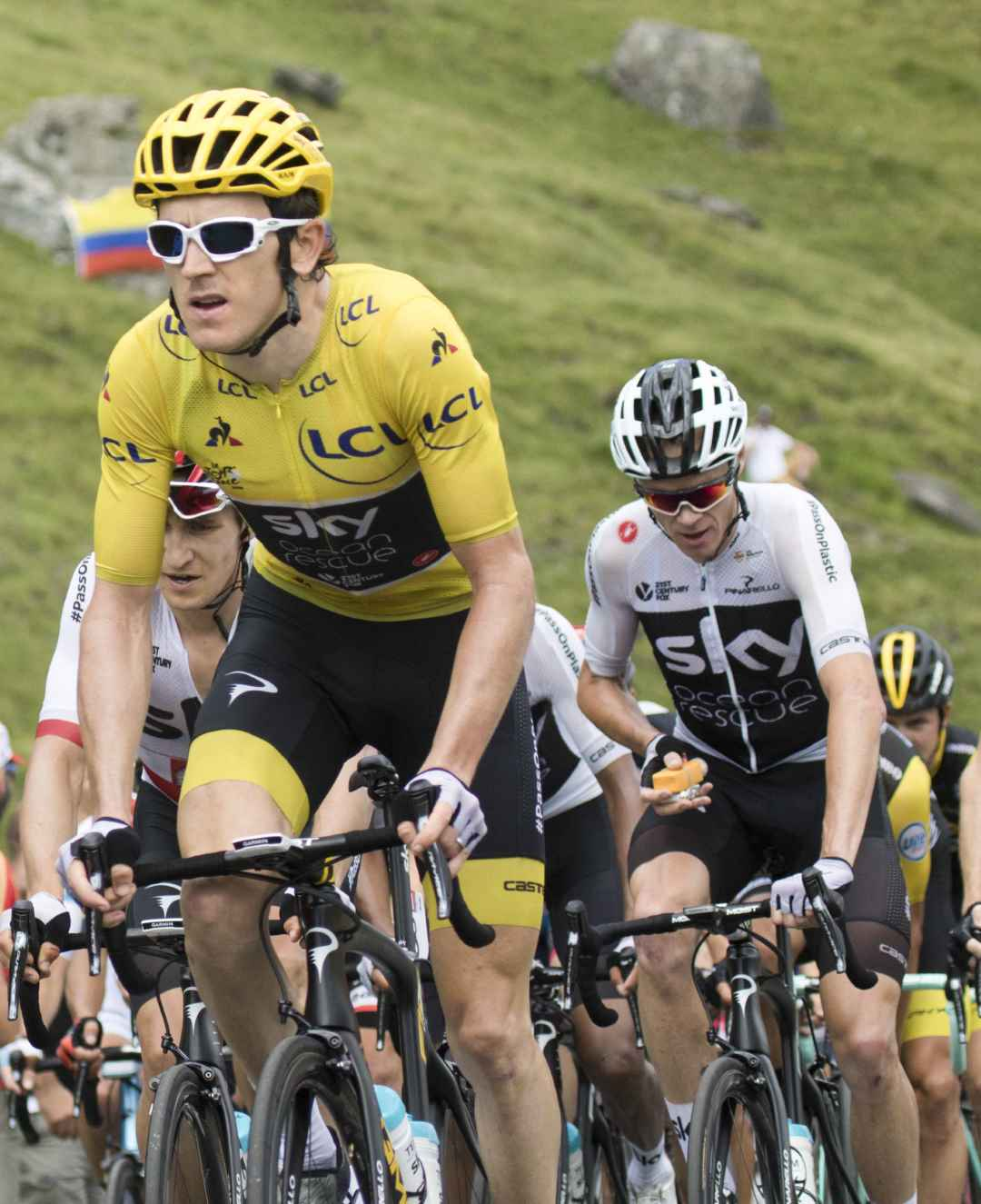
Geraint Thomas (left) leads Chris Froome during the 2018 Tour de France.

As the Tour de France began, the team lead with a two-pronged attack, incumbent champion Froome hoping for a fourth straight grand tour win and fifth overall title and Thomas reigning Dauphiné champion and super-domestique in previous editions of the race. By the end of the first week of racing, Thomas had ridden a flawless race and was second overall, only six seconds behind Greg Van Avermaet. Froome was 14th, over a minute behind the Belgian race leader. Thomas and Froome both lost time to Van Avermaet on stage nine as the race transitioned across the cobbles of Roubaix, with Thomas 43 seconds and Froome 1' 42" behind the race leader. By the end of stage 10 these deficits had grown to 2' 22 for Thomas and 3' 21" for Froome.

As the race entered the Alps Thomas cemented his control on the race and the team, claiming consecutive victories at the summit finishes of La Rosière and Alpe d'Huez. By the end of stage 12 Thomas lead had grown to 1' 39" over team-mate Froome. Colombian prodigy, Bernal, in his first grand tour of his career was 19th overall 21' 22" behind Thomas. Following the 15th stage, controversy arouse around Gianni Moscon, who had been seen punching Fortuneo–Samsic rider Élie Gesbert during the opening kilometres of the stage. After reviewing footage of the incident, the race jury disqualified him for 'particularly serious aggression', leaving Sky with 7 riders for the remaining stages.

On stage 17 Froome cracked, slipping to third overall 2' 31" behind Thomas. This promoted Giro d'Italia runner-up, Tom Dumoulin, to second overall 1' 59" behind Welshman Thomas. Thomas ultimately won the race overall, and the team recorded their fourth consecutive grand tour win, fifth Tour de France title and second successive year achieving more than one grand tour win. Thanks to his second-place performance on the penultimate day time trial, Froome joined Thomas on the final podium finishing third overall.

Into the latter part of the season, Kwiatkowski maintained his good form from the Tour de France, winning his home stage race – the Tour de Pologne, claiming two stage wins. He headed into the final grand tour of the year, the Vuelta a España, as the team's general classification leader and finished 43rd overall, nearly an hour and three quarters behind race winner, Simon Yates. The teams best finisher was de la Cruz, 15th overall and 28 minutes behind the race winner.

The team went on to claim two stage wins at the Tour of Britain courtesy of Poels and Ian Stannard. Gianni Moscon returned after a five-week suspension in good form as the road to the final monument of the year began, winning Coppa Ugo Agostoni and the Giro della Toscana, as well as the Italian national time trial title. Moscon went on to take the overall victory at the 2018 Tour of Guangxi – the team's final victory of the year.

=== 2019: Transition to new sponsorship ===
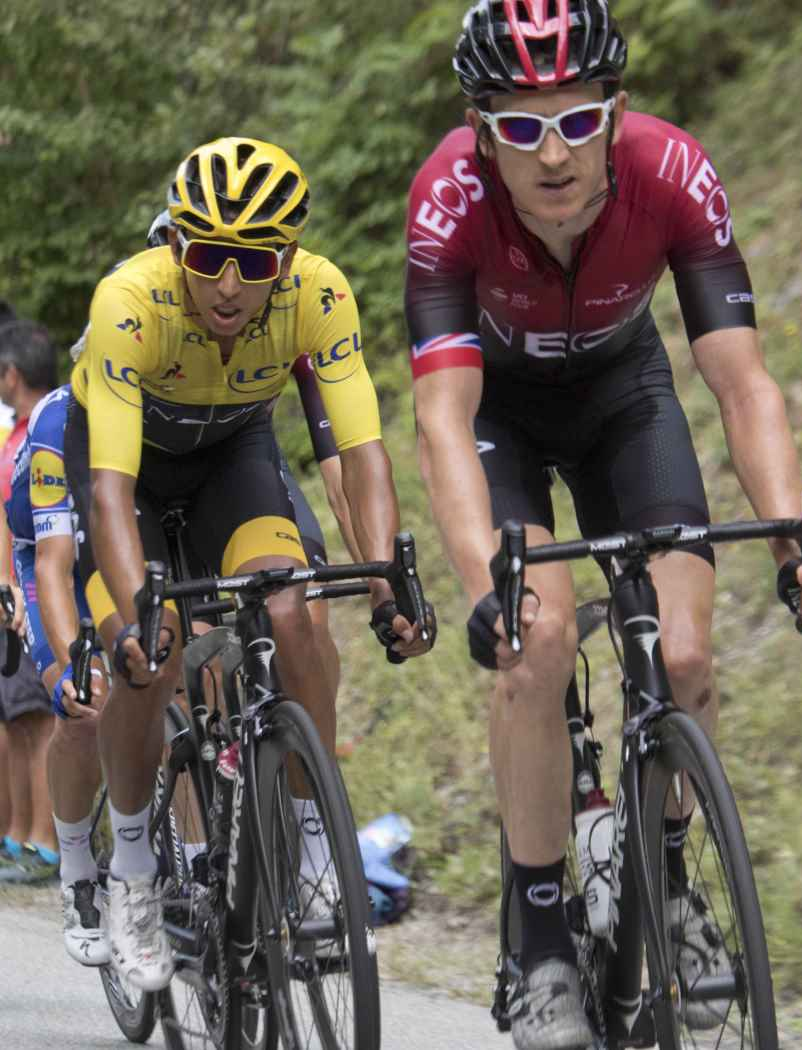
Egan Bernal (left) and Geraint Thomas at the 2019 Tour de France

In mid-December 2018, Sky announced they would withdraw their sponsorship as part of an ongoing review brought on by their acquisition by Comcast. 21st Century Fox also announced that it would end its partnership at the end of the season, forcing the team into a sponsorship search in order to continue. In February 2019, Cyclingnews.com reported that potential sponsorship could be sourced via a combination of the Colombian government and state-controlled oil and gas company, Ecopetrol. Later reports claimed that no deal had been forthcoming.

In mid-March, Cyclingnews.com again broke the news that another potential sponsor had been found. The report linked the team with British-based multi-national chemical company, Ineos, with the team expected to become Team Ineos for the 2020 season. Ineos is controlled by Manchester-born billionaire, Jim Ratcliffe, who has amassed an estimated fortune of over £21 billion. Ratcliffe has also invested over £100 million in Ben Ainslie's sailing team. The web-domain "TeamIneos.com" was discovered to have been registered on 5 March, and the Twitter handle "@teamineos" was also registered.

On 19 March, Team Sky confirmed its new title sponsor, announcing it was to be renamed 'Team Ineos' on 1 May, ahead of the 2019 Tour de Yorkshire. However, the UCI's rules prevent teams from racing under different names at the same time – Sky had planned to take part in the 2019 Tour de Romandie, starting on 30 April as well as the Tour de Yorkshire. As a consequence, it announced that the Romandie would be the first race under the Ineos name, with the team wearing a special black kit, while the Yorkshire would see the launch of the team's new colours.

For the 2019 season the team signed world individual pursuit champion, Filippo Ganna and former rider, Ben Swift (UAE Team Emirates); former Ecuadorian national road champion, Jhonatan Narváez (Quick-Step Floors). After a protracted transfer the team also signed Colombian talent – Iván Sosa (Androni Giocattoli–Sidermec). Philip Deignan and David López retired, Sergio Henao left to join UAE Team Emirates, Beñat Intxausti joined Euskadi–Murias and Łukasz Wiśniowski joined the newly Polish-sponsored BMC team, CCC Pro Team. Jonathan Dibben also left the team.

=== 2020: Ineos Grenadiers ===
The logo of the team under the Ineos Grenadiers name.

For the 2020 season the team announced a number of new signings: 2019 Giro d'Italia champion, Richard Carapaz (Movistar Team), double and reigning Time Trial World Champion, Rohan Dennis, Ethan Hayter, Brandon Rivera (GW–Shimano) and Carlos Rodriguez.

David de la Cruz left the team to join UAE Team Emirates, Kenny Elissonde joined Trek–Segafredo, Kristoffer Halvorsen joined (EF Education First Pro Cycling), Wout Poels joined Team Bahrain McLaren and Diego Rosa joined Arkéa–Samsic.

Ineos had the highest payroll of any team in cycling for the 2020 season, and of the top ten highest paid riders in the sport, five of them rode for Ineos. In Euros, Carapaz was paid 2.1 million, Kwiatkowski 2.5 million, Bernal 2.7 million, Geraint Thomas 3.5 million and Chris Froome was the 2nd highest paid cyclist in the sport contracted to make 4.5 million.

On 30 January 2020, the team announced the retirement of Vasil Kiryienka due to heart problems. The following day, Australian Cameron Wurf joined the squad.

On 3 March 2020, the team's lead sports director Nicolas Portal died suddenly of a heart attack at the age of 40. A day later, the team announced that it would temporarily withdraw from racing until 23 March in time for the Volta a Catalunya. The reasoning behind the decision was twofold: to allow the team to properly mourn Portal's passing, and to keep all its members safe amidst the growing coronavirus outbreak which saw the final two stages of the UAE Tour cancelled.

Additional races on the 2020 calendar were either postponed to later in the year or cancelled outright due to restrictions and lockdowns in several European countries forced by the pandemic. On 12 April, the entire team took part in a special event via interactive cycling site Zwift. Over 15,000 fans from around the world rode with the team in a virtual group ride, which was followed by an e-race where all 30 riders on the active roster competed against each other. It was streamed on YouTube and the team's Facebook page, with commentary by Eurosport's Rob Hatch and Matt Stephens. The race was won by Rohan Dennis.

On 9 July 2020, it was announced that the contract of Chris Froome would not be renewed, ending his 10-year association with the team. An hour later, Froome signed a multi-year deal with Israel Start-Up Nation for the 2021 season.

On 12 October 2022, the team announced the signing of their first ever female rider; the multi discipline star Pauline Ferrand-Prévot.

== Sponsorship and budgets ==
According to the results of a study commissioned by Cyclingnews.com and performed by Repucom, the team gave more media value to their sponsors and partners than any other cycling team. The team delivered approximately $550m in advertising value, the highest amount achieved by any professional team.

BSkyB provided £30 million in sponsorship for the team and will back the team as name sponsor until the end of 2013. The team also receives further sponsorship from 21st Century Fox (previously News Corporation) and Sky Italia. Pinarello supplies bicycle frames and forks. On 5 January 2010, Adidas were announced as the team's official apparel and accessories partner.

Gatorade, Marks & Spencer, Oakley, IG Markets are additional sponsors. Jaguar are providers of the team cars. The team jerseys were changed to black and green beginning with the 2011 Tour de France, when the team formed Sky Rainforest Rescue, a three-year partnership with WWF to help raise awareness of deforestation in Brazil. At the 2018 Tour de France, the team wore special kit in support of the Sky Ocean Rescue initiative, with the goal of eliminating single-use plastic team-wide by 2020.

On 25 June 2013, the team announced that the logo of 21st Century Fox, the direct successor to News Corporation following the spin-off of its publishing business, would appear on the team's kit and team vehicles.

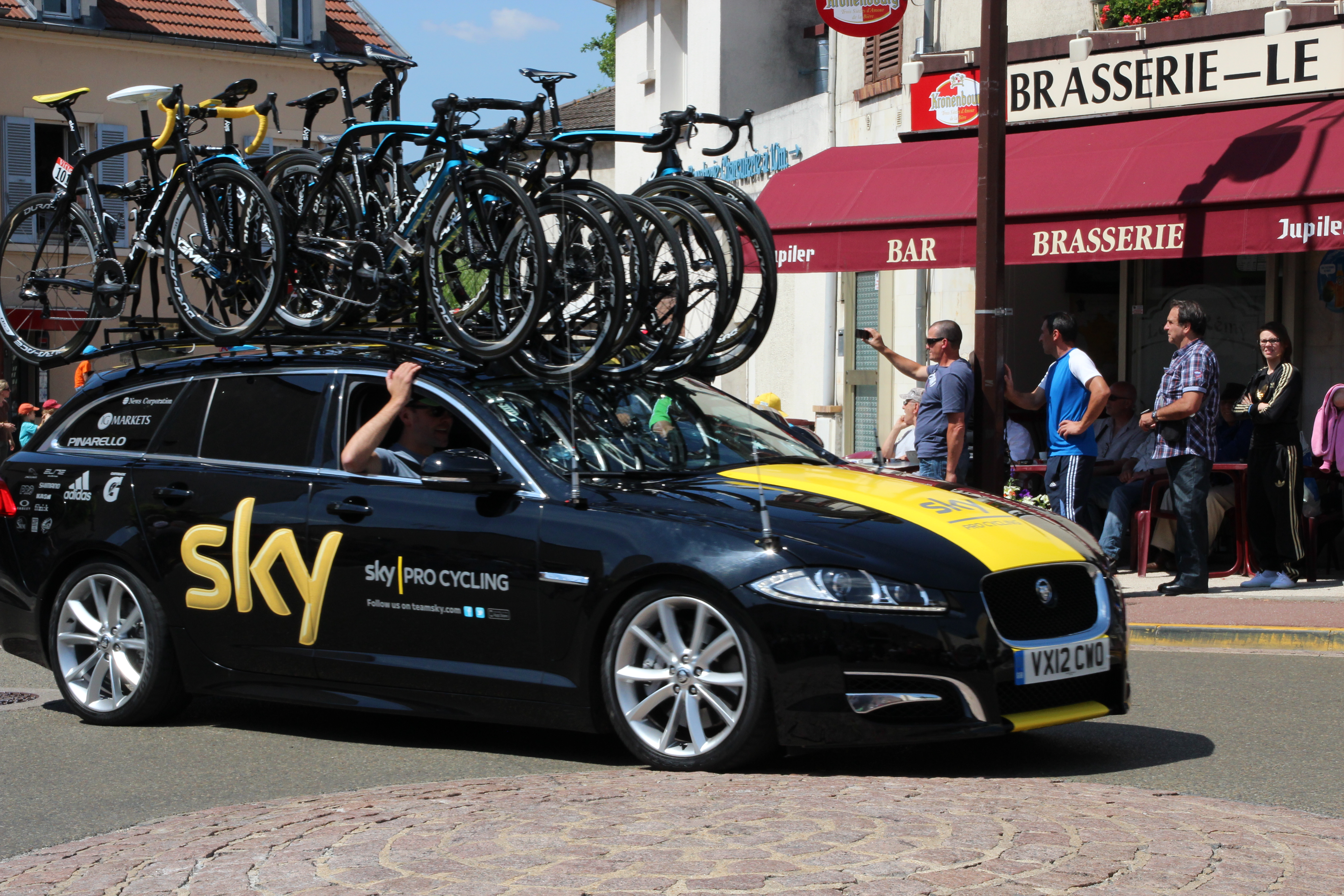
The team support car at the 2012 Tour de France, with a change of livery due to rider Bradley Wiggins wearing the yellow jersey.

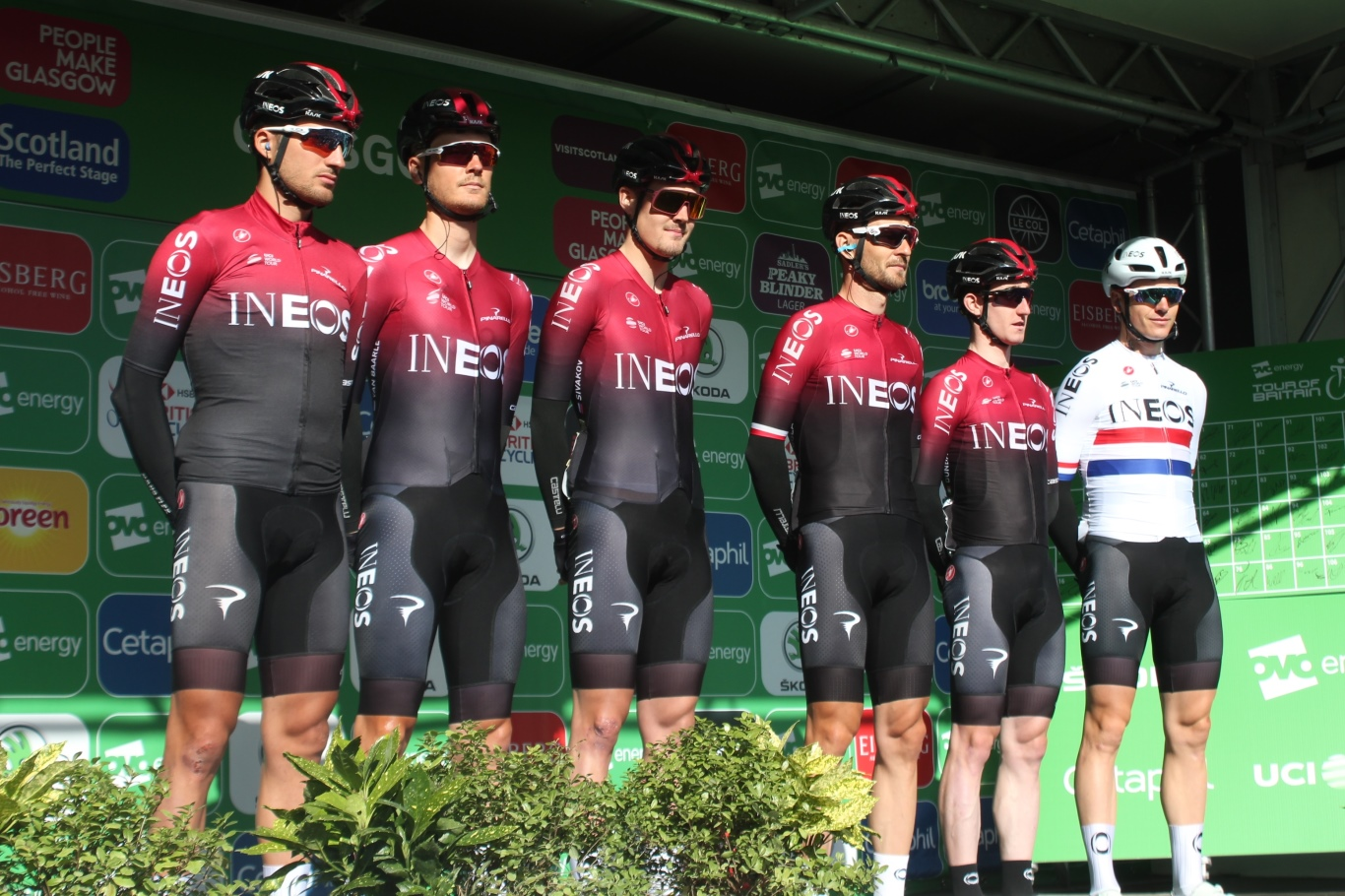
Team Ineos riders in the Castelli jerseys of their new sponsor at the 2019 Tour of Britain

On the second rest day of the 2016 Tour de France, the team announced they had signed a four-year extension with Pinarello – supplying the team with bikes until 2020.

Castelli started providing the team's kit beginning in 2017 after their 3-year partnership with Rapha ended. The new kit was revealed during the Rouleur Classic event on 3 November 2016.

On 12 December 2018, Sky's parent company 21st Century Fox confirmed that they would withdraw sponsorship of the team at the end of the 2019 season, but would until the 2019 Tour de France seek a new sponsor.

On 19 March 2019, Team Sky announced that Ineos, a multinational chemicals company owned by Jim Ratcliffe, would become the new title sponsor as of 1 May 2019.

In 2021, the team announced that Belgian kit manufacturer Bioracer will provide the team kit from 2022 onwards.

On 13 December 2023, the team announced that Gobik would become their new on-bike race apparal partner from 2024, replacing Bioracer as the manufacturer of the teams kits in a 'long-term partnership.'

The team welcomed Danish IT provider Netcompany as a new co-title sponsor ahead of the 2026 Giro d'Italia.

| Equipment | Sponsor | Other sponsors |
|---|---|---|
| Bikes | Pinarello (2010–) | Kask (Helmets); Pro (finishing kits); Fi'zi:ik (Saddles); SunGod (eyewear); Elite; Muc-Off; Park Tool iProspect |
| Team vehicles | Jaguar (2010–2015); Ford (2016–2019); Mercedes-Benz (2020–2023); BMW (2024-) | Kask (Helmets); Pro (finishing kits); Fi'zi:ik (Saddles); SunGod (eyewear); Elite; Muc-Off; Park Tool iProspect |
| Team kit & clothing | Adidas (2010–2012); Rapha (2013–2016); Castelli (2017–2021); Bioracer (2022–2023); Gobik (2024–) | Kask (Helmets); Pro (finishing kits); Fi'zi:ik (Saddles); SunGod (eyewear); Elite; Muc-Off; Park Tool iProspect |
| Groupset | Shimano (2010–) | Kask (Helmets); Pro (finishing kits); Fi'zi:ik (Saddles); SunGod (eyewear); Elite; Muc-Off; Park Tool iProspect |
| Powermeter | Stages (2014–) | Kask (Helmets); Pro (finishing kits); Fi'zi:ik (Saddles); SunGod (eyewear); Elite; Muc-Off; Park Tool iProspect |
| Nutrition | CNP Professional Sports Nutrition; Science In Sport (2016–); Healthspan Elite (2016–) | Kask (Helmets); Pro (finishing kits); Fi'zi:ik (Saddles); SunGod (eyewear); Elite; Muc-Off; Park Tool iProspect |
| Smart trainers | Wahoo Fitness (2014–2021); Tacx (2022-) | Kask (Helmets); Pro (finishing kits); Fi'zi:ik (Saddles); SunGod (eyewear); Elite; Muc-Off; Park Tool iProspect |

Tour Racing Ltd
| Season | Budget per season (£ millions) |
|---|---|
| 2010 | 14.603 |
| 2011 | 16.680 |
| 2012 | 21.398 |
| 2013 | 22.060 |
| 2014 | 24.479 |
| 2015 | 24.442 |
| 2016 | 31.084 |
| 2017 | 34.496 |
| 2018 | 38.016 |
| 2019 | 42.994 |

== Media ==
A five-part documentary series following the team's 2012 season, Team Sky and British Cycling: The Road to Glory, premiered on Sky Atlantic on 30 August 2012. Another documentary Bradley Wiggins: A Year in Yellow, following Wiggins's exploits in the 2012 season was first shown on the same channel in November 2012. The team have also produced two books chronicling the 2012 Tour de France and 2013 season- 21 Days to Glory and The Pain and the Glory.

== Team roster ==
As of 13 March 2026.

| Rider | Date of birth |
|---|---|
| Thymen Arensman (NED) | 4 December 1999 (age 26) |
| Andrew August (USA) | 12 October 2005 (age 21) |
| Egan Bernal (COL) | 13 January 1997 (age 29) |
| Laurens De Plus (BEL) | 4 September 1995 (age 31) |
| Tobias Foss (NOR) | 25 May 1997 (age 29) |
| Filippo Ganna (ITA) | 25 July 1996 (age 30) |
| Dorian Godon (FRA) | 25 May 1996 (age 30) |
| Jack Haig (AUS) | 6 September 1993 (age 33) |
| Lucas Hamilton (AUS) | 12 February 1996 (age 30) |
| Kim Heiduk (GER) | 3 March 2000 (age 26) |
| Bob Jungels (LUX) | 22 September 1992 (age 34) |
| Michał Kwiatkowski (POL) | 2 June 1990 (age 36) |
| Victor Langellotti (MON) | 7 June 1995 (age 31) |
| Axel Laurance (FRA) | 13 April 2001 (age 25) |

| Rider | Date of birth |
|---|---|
| Oscar Onley (GBR) | 13 October 2002 (age 24) |
| Brandon Rivera (COL) | 21 March 1996 (age 30) |
| Carlos Rodriguez (ESP) | 2 February 2001 (age 25) |
| Óscar Rodríguez (ESP) | 6 May 1995 (age 31) |
| Magnus Sheffield (USA) | 19 April 2002 (age 24) |
| Embret Svestad-Bårdseng (NOR) | 1 September 2002 (age 24) |
| Ben Swift (GBR) | 5 November 1987 (age 39) |
| Connor Swift (GBR) | 30 October 1995 (age 31) |
| Joshua Tarling (GBR) | 15 February 2004 (age 22) |
| Ben Turner (GBR) | 28 May 1999 (age 27) |
| Kévin Vauquelin (FRA) | 26 April 2001 (age 25) |
| Sam Watson (GBR) | 24 September 2001 (age 25) |
| Sam Welsford (AUS) | 19 January 1996 (age 30) |

== Doping policy ==
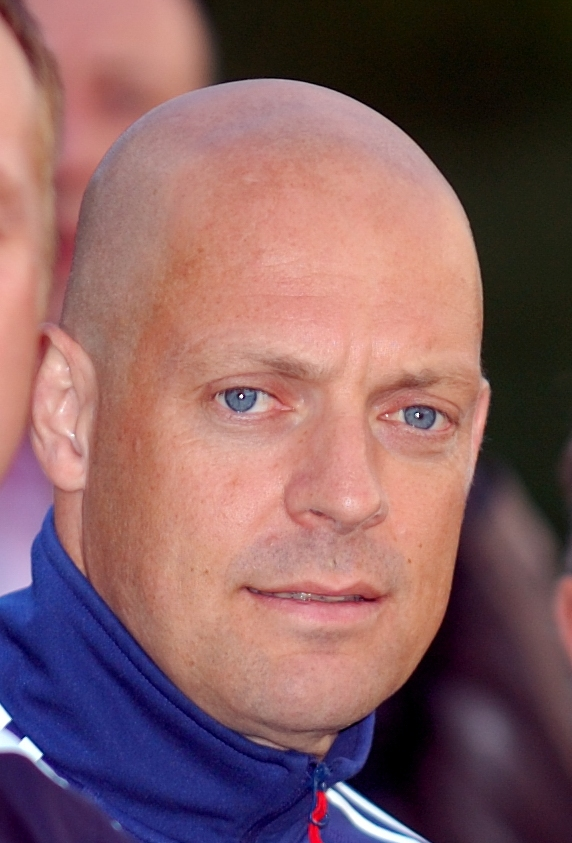
The team's general manager, David Brailsford

The team claims to have a zero-tolerance approach to doping. All its riders and staff must sign an agreement that they have no past or present involvement in taking illegal substances. Anyone breaching the agreement at any time must leave the squad. Previous team members such as team doctor Geert Leinders, sports director Steven de Jongh and coach Bobby Julich have all left the team when their involvement in doping prior to working with Sky became known. This approach has been criticised by David Howman of WADA, who has argued that fear of losing their job will discourage people with a history of doping from confessing.

Although there have been speculations that Team Sky's tactics and success imply use of banned substances, Brailsford has strenuously denied any team use of illegal substances, citing his team's success in the Olympics as proof that they can win without doping.

In September 2013, Jonathan Tiernan-Locke was asked by the UCI to explain a potential discrepancy in his biological passport data. In December 2013, British Cycling confirmed it had been instructed to begin disciplinary proceedings against Tiernan-Locke by the UCI. Sky stated the blood values in question were taken in 2012, when Tiernan-Locke was a member of the Endura Racing squad, and he was suspended from all team activities pending a decision. In July 2014 Tiernan-Locke was banned from competition until 31 December 2015 by the UCI, resulting in his contract with the team being terminated with immediate effect.

In March 2014, Sergio Henao was removed from race schedules for at least eight weeks pending the conclusion of an "altitude research programme", following tests that were taken over the winter whilst Henao was training at altitude in Colombia. In June 2014, Henao returned to racing at the Tour de Suisse, after completing an independent research programme investigating the physiology of "altitude natives" in conjunction with the University of Sheffield.

In April 2016, the Cycling Anti-Doping Foundation (CADF) opened an investigation into Sergio Henao's biological passport data from between 2011 and 2015. As a result, the team withdrew Henao from their active roster. After investigation, including a review of the research done in the previous year for Team Sky, CADF declared Henao had no case to answer, and he was restored to the racing squad.

In December 2017, Chris Froome returned an adverse analytical finding (AAF) for salbutamol over the WADA threshold of 1000 ng/mL, potentially resulting in a ban and the loss of his 2017 Vuelta title. On 2 July 2018, the UCI, with the assistance of WADA, concluded there was no AAF upon further investigation of the evidence and closed the case against Froome. He was exonerated from any wrongdoing, which allowed his Vuelta title to stand. Both Froome and the team welcomed the decision.

=== TUEs, UKAD and subsequent fallout ===
==== Therapeutic use exemptions ====
In September 2016, Russian cyber espionage group Fancy Bear hacked the World Anti-Doping Agency (WADA) ADAMS anti-doping system and released data on a number of athletes, including Chris Froome and Bradley Wiggins. Therapeutic use exemptions (TUEs) are medical exemptions athletes can be given when they need treatment for pre-existing medical conditions where the drugs used in the treatment are on the WADA prohibited compound list.

The leak demonstrated that Wiggins had received TUEs for triamcinolone acetonide in June 2011, June 2012 and April 2013, a number of days before the start of the 2011 Tour de France, 2012 Tour de France, and 2013 Giro d'Italia respectively. Wiggins also received TUEs for salbutamol, fluticasone, formoterol and budesonide whilst at Team Highroad. Froome had received TUEs for prednisolone in May 2013 and during the 2014 Tour de Romandie.

In response Froome said he had "no issues" with the leak whilst Wiggins's spokesperson said "there's nothing new here".

==== UKAD investigation ====
In October 2016, UK Anti-Doping (UKAD) opened an investigation into Team Sky and British Cycling. It was revealed that Simon Cope delivered a package, to the team, during the 2011 Critérium du Dauphiné, giving it to team Doctor Richard Freeman confirming the package contained some form of medicine. Neither the team nor Cope could confirm the exact contents of the package. Former rider, Jonathan Tiernan-Locke (who has since served a ban for an anti-doping violation) claimed that Freeman had administered Tramadol to the British national team during the 2012 UCI Road World Championships.

In late October, parliament announced it would open an investigation into the relationship between the medical package and former rider, Bradley Wiggins. In December 2016, UCI President Brian Cookson urged both Team Sky and general manager, Dave Brailsford to give "full disclosure" about what was in the package. British Cycling has warned Cope about his relationship with both the team as well as the British National team.

In December 2016, Brailsford announced that the package contained the legal drug, Fluimucil – a mucolytic compound which helps the body to remove sticky and thick mucus that can often be found obstructing the airway, resulting in coughing. British Cycling officials maintained that they did not know the contents of the package.

In March 2017, British Cycling admitted its failure in correctly recording the contents of the package, whilst the team maintained that no anti-doping rules had been broken.

In early March news broke around a number of riders potentially considering asking Brailsford to resign from the team, however on the same day Geraint Thomas, Luke Rowe, Tao Geoghegan Hart, Peter Kennaugh, Michał Kwiatkowski and Elia Viviani came out in support of their General Manager.

In March, former team rider, Joshua Edmondson admitted to the BBC that he violated the team's "no needle" policy by injecting himself with a cocktail of vitamins – carnitine, folic acid, 'TAD' (reduced glutathione) – two or three times a week, for a month. The team stated that they found the vitamins, which were not prohibited compounds, and needles in the riders room. A day later the UCI's Cycling Anti-Doping Foundation asked UK Anti-Doping to assess Edmondson's admission.

On 15 November 2017, the UKAD announced that it had closed its investigation and filed no charges, citing that it was impossible to determine the contents of the package. Both the team and British Cycling issued statements welcoming its conclusion.

=== UK Parliamentary report into "Combatting doping in sport" ===
In March 2018, The Commons Digital, Culture, Media and Sport Committee published the report Combatting doping in sport. The report stated that Team Sky had "crossed an ethical line" by using medical drugs to "enhance the performance of riders" and that Brailsford must "take responsibility for the "damaging scepticism about the legitimacy of his team's performance and accomplishments."

Following the report, Bradley Wiggins, in an interview with the BBC, claimed that he "100 per cent did not cheat", and believed he was a victim of a smear campaign. He was also critical of the 'anonymous' source, demanding that the source should be made public. Chris Froome later came out in support of Brailsford remaining team principal, rubbishing the accusations laid out in the report whilst Geraint Thomas said that the team had never even joked about using corticosteroids.

Former rider, Bernhard Eisel also denied in 2018 any drug use during his tenure with the team. Eisel also criticised reports for a lack of verifiable proof, further suggesting that this had "created a vacuum, within which he [Eisel] felt social media had filled in the blanks" as well as criticising comments made by former cyclist, Floyd Landis, regarding the removal of Wiggins's 2012 title.

== National, continental, world and Olympic champions ==
2010
British Road Race, Geraint Thomas
British Time Trial, Bradley Wiggins
Norway Time Trial, Edvald Boasson Hagen
2011
British Road Race, Bradley Wiggins
British Time Trial, Alex Dowsett
Finland Road Race, Kjell Carlström
Norway Time Trial, Edvald Boasson Hagen
2012
Norway Road Race, Edvald Boasson Hagen
British Road Race, Ian Stannard
British Time Trial, Alex Dowsett
World Track (Team Pursuit), Geraint Thomas and Peter Kennaugh
Olympic Time Trial, Bradley Wiggins
Olympic Team Pursuit, Geraint Thomas and Peter Kennaugh
2013
Norway Time Trial, Edvald Boasson Hagen
Belarus Time Trial, Kanstantsin Sivtsov
2014
British Road Race, Peter Kennaugh
British Time Trial, Bradley Wiggins
Belarus Time Trial, Kanstantsin Sivtsov
World Time Trial, Bradley Wiggins
2015
Australian Time Trial, Richie Porte
Belarus Time Trial, Vasil Kiryienka
British Road Race, Peter Kennaugh
World Time Trial, Vasil Kiryienka
European Omnium, Elia Viviani
2016
Czech Time Trial, Leopold König
Irish Time Trial, Nicolas Roche
Irish Road Race, Nicolas Roche
Olympic omnium, Elia Viviani
2017
Colombia Road Race, Sergio Henao
Polish Time Trial, Michał Kwiatkowski
Italian Time Trial, Gianni Moscon
2018
Colombia Time Trial, Egan Bernal
Colombia Road Race, Sergio Henao
Spain Time Trial, Jonathan Castroviejo
Polish Road Race, Michał Kwiatkowski
Dutch Time Trial, Dylan van Baarle
British Time Trial, Geraint Thomas
Belarusian Time Trial, Vasil Kiryienka
Italian Time Trial, Gianni Moscon
2019
World Track (Individual Pursuit), Filippo Ganna
Italian Time Trial, Filippo Ganna
Spain Time Trial, Jonathan Castroviejo
British Road Race, Ben Swift
2020
World Track (Individual Pursuit), Filippo Ganna
Italian Time Trial, Filippo Ganna
World Time Trial, Filippo Ganna
2021
Olympic Road Race, Richard Carapaz
Olympic Cross-country, Tom Pidcock
Olympic Team Pursuit, Filippo Ganna
European Team relay, Filippo Ganna
World Time Trial, Filippo Ganna
British Time Trial, Ethan Hayter
British Criterium, Ethan Hayter
British Road Race, Ben Swift
World Track (Team Pursuit), Filippo Ganna
World Track (Omnium), Ethan Hayter
2022
Australian Road Race, Luke Plapp
World Cyclo-cross, Tom Pidcock
Colombian Time Trial, Daniel Martínez
Ecuador Time Trial, Richard Carapaz
Italian Time Trial, Filippo Ganna
British Time Trial, Ethan Hayter
Spain Road Race, Carlos Rodríguez
European XCO Championships, Tom Pidcock
World Track (Individual Pursuit), Filippo Ganna
World Track (Team Pursuit), Ethan Hayter
World Track (Elimination Race), Elia Viviani
World Track (Omnium), Ethan Hayter
2023
Australian Road Race, Luke Plapp
British Time Trial, Joshua Tarling
Italian Time Trial, Filippo Ganna
Polish Time Trial, Michał Kwiatkowski
Spain Time Trial, Jonathan Castroviejo
World Track (Individual Pursuit), Filippo Ganna
World Mountain Bike Championships (Short Track), Pauline Ferrand-Prévot
World Mountain Bike Championships (XCO), Pauline Ferrand-Prévot
World Mountain Bike Championships (XCO), Tom Pidcock
European Time Trial, Joshua Tarling
2024
Ecuador Road Race, Jhonatan Narváez
2025
Colombia Time Trial, Egan Bernal
Colombia Road Race, Egan Bernal
United States Time Trial, Artem Shmidt
2026
Colombia Time Trial, Brandon Rivera

== Awards ==
- Velonews.com Velo Awards – Best Men's Team (2013)
- Velonews.com Velo Awards – Support Rider of the Year – Richie Porte (2013)
- Vélo d'Or – Best rider – Chris Froome (2013, 2015, 2017)
- London Design Awards – Product Design, Sport and Active life category – for the Dogma F8 in conjunction with Pinarello and Jaguar (2014)
- European Sponsorship Association Excellence Awards – Best Use of PR – in conjunction with Jaguar (2014)
- Cyclingnews.com – Best Male Team (2015, 2016, 2017)
- Cyclingtps.com.au CT Awards – Ultimate Team Player – Richie Porte (2015)
- Cyclingtps.com.au CT Awards – Most Impressive Team (2015)
- Cyclingnews.com – Moment of the Year (Chris Froome's run up Mont Ventoux, 2016)
- Cyclingnews.com – Best Male Road Rider – Chris Froome (2017)
- Cyclingnews.com – Rider of the Year – Chris Froome (2017)
- Sports Journalists' Association Sportsman of the Year – Chris Froome (2017)
- Liontrust's Sporting Hero award – Chris Froome (September 2017)
