= Castelli (brand) =

Italian sportswear brand

- Industry: Clothing
- Founded: 1876; 150 years ago
- Founder: Gianni Vittore
- Headquarters: Fonzaso, Italy
- Key people: Armando Castelli
- Products: Jerseys, jackets, shorts, t-shirts
- Parent: Manifattura Valcismon Spa
- Website: castelli-cycling.com

Castelli is an Italian brand of sports clothing and accessories based in Fonzaso in Veneto. Castelli is a company specializing in cycling and triathlon clothing. Castelli brand products are characterized by a logo representing a white scorpion inside a red circle.

== History ==
=== Gianni Vittore's workshop ===
In 1876, Gianni Vittore opened a shop in Milan where he made clothes by hand for businessmen, for the Milanese ballet troupe and football teams such as Milan and Juventus. Alfredo Binda, winner of the Giro d'Italia several times, was one of his customers.

In 1935, Armando Castelli joined Gianni's staff, in the same year he decided to buy the company where he worked and to keep Gianni Vittore's clientele, including Gino Bartali and Fausto Coppi.

=== Castelli brandname ===
Castelli expanded the production by supplying various teams and in the following years even the great stars of cycling such as Louison Bobet, Rik Van Looy and Jacques Anquetil wore Castelli clothing.

In 1948 Maurizio, Armando's son, was born, and from an early age was captivated by sportswear, learning the trade from his father. The two did not get along for a long time; the traditionalist ways of the father clashed with the creativity of the son, so Maurizio in 1974 gave life to his own company which he called Castelli and choosing a scorpion as his emblem.

In 1977, he had the intuition to introduce Lycra, a revolutionary elastic material at that time used only by skiers, for cycling shorts. Inspired by the success of the Lycra shorts, Maurizio continued to apply his skills in cycling. Champions such as Eddy Merckx, Bernard Hinault, Francesco Moser, Giuseppe Saronni, Ercole Baldini and Silvio Martinello chose Castelli clothing for their races. Maurizio was a pioneer of sublimation dyeing which made it possible to have colours, logos and graphics on a technical fabric. On 9 November 1979, Castelli was awarded the gold Discobolus, a prestigious award from Corriere dello Sport – Stadio.

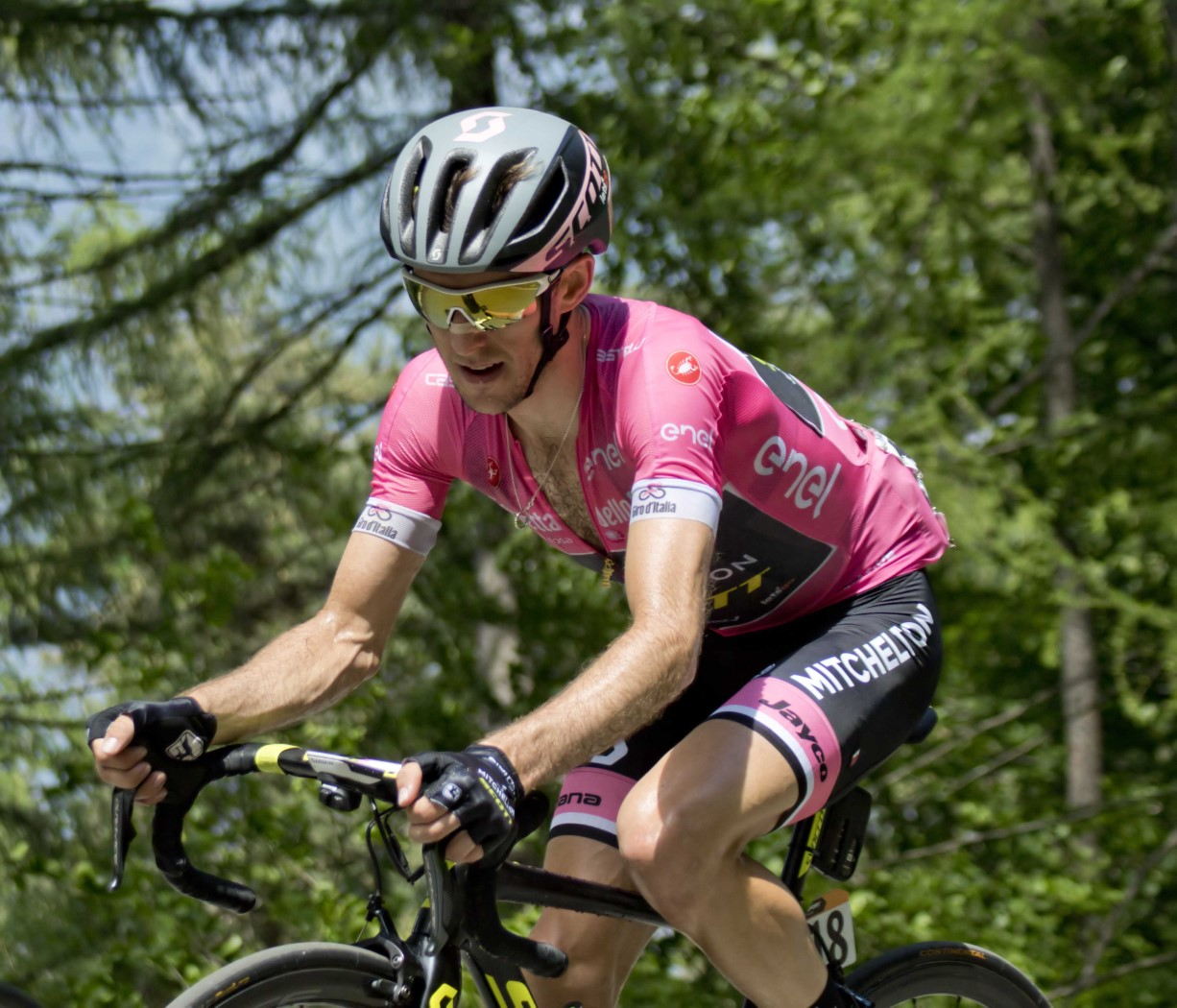
Simon Yates wearing the Castelli Maglia rosa at the 2018 Giro d'Italia

In 1981, Maurizio dressed his cyclists in turquoise Lycra shorts, when at the time only black shorts were allowed, so the riders showed up at the starting line creating an unexpected explosion of colour but then had to change their shorts.

In 1995, Maurizio Castelli died suddenly at the age of 47 due to a heart attack while cycling on the Cipressa. In 1996, at the Olympic Games in Atlanta, Paola Pezzo wore Castelli, winning the gold medal in mountain bike. Castelli was the first brand to embark on an entirely women's collection for cycling. In 1997 Castelli revolutionised the cycling seat pad, giving life to Progetto Y.

1999, marked Castelli's return to professional cycling with the Spanish team ONCE-Deutsche Bank. In the following decade, riders such as Laurent Jalabert, Carlos Sastre and Andrea Peron wore Castelli, as well as many important teams such as Roslotto, Refin Ceramiche, Tenax, Tinkoff and Saunier Duval.

In 2003, Giordano Cremonese, president of Manifattura Valcismon, the parent company of the Sportful brand, decided to buy Castelli and transfer it from Rosate to Fonzaso.

In 2009, Castelli became part of the supplier brands of Cervélo TestTeam which included, among others, Carlos Sastre, Thor Hushovd and Heinrich Haussler. In 2017 Castelli became an official sponsor of Team Sky, which later became Team Ineos in 2019. In 2018 they signed a deal to sponsor the Giro d'Italia's jerseys signing a four-year contract.

In 2021, they announced they would be ending their sponsorship with Team Ineos and began sponsoring Quick-Step Alpha Vinyl Team starting in 2022.

== Sponsorships ==
=== Teams ===
- Quick-Step Alpha Vinyl Team (2022-)
- Ceratizit-WNT Pro Cycling Team (2022-)

=== Athletes ===
- Nathan Peter Haas (2022-)

=== Triathlon ===
- Timothy O'Donnell
- Frederik Van Lierde
- Patrick Lange
- Laura Philipp
