= General classification in the Giro d'Italia =

Most important classification of the Giro d'Italia

Pink jersey
- Isaac del Toro wearing the pink jersey.
- Sport: Road Cycling
- Competition: Giro d'Italia
- Awarded for: Winner overall classification
- Local name: Maglia Rosa (in Italian)

History
- First award: 1909 (first pink jersey in 1931)
- Editions: 108 (as of 2025)
- First winner: Luigi Ganna (ITA)
- Most wins: Alfredo Binda (ITA); Fausto Coppi (ITA); Eddy Merckx (BEL) (5 wins each)
- Most recent: Jonas Vingegaard (DEN)

The general classification in the Giro d'Italia is the most important classification of the Giro d'Italia, which determines who is the overall winner. It is therefore considered more important than secondary classifications as the points classification or the mountains classification.

Since 1931, the leader of the general classification has been identified by a pink jersey (Italian: maglia rosa [ˈmaʎʎa ˈrɔːza]). Prior to that year and since the creation of the race, no colour was used to distinguish the winner at the top of the classification. The first rider to wear the maglia rosa was Learco Guerra following the first stage of the 1931 Giro d'Italia. The first jersey was entirely pink and made from wool. It had a roll-neck collar and front pockets. As Italy was under Fascist Party rule there was a gray shield stitched onto the shirt, a symbol for the party. This initial jersey and many of the first pink jerseys were designed by Vittore Gianni who had created jerseys for AC Milan and Juventus. Castelli has made the pink jerseys from 1981 to being worn by Miguel Indurain last in 1992. In 2018 they resigned a four-year agreement to be the sponsor of the jersey again. Since 2000, the pink jersey has been altered between years from being exclusively solid pink, like in 2006 there was a bike pattern on the jersey in a darker shade of pink. To celebrate the 2009 Giro d'Italia which was on the 100th anniversary of the race's beginning in 1909, the jersey had side panels displaying the Italian colors of green, white, and red and was designed by Dolce and Gabbana. Other designers that have designed a maglia rosa include Paul Smith and Fergus Niland, the latter of which made all the classification jerseys have a shamrock pattern while the 2014 race raced throughout Ireland.

In the first editions of the Giro d'Italia, a points system was used for the calculation of the general classification, but since 1914 a time system is used. All stage results are added together, taking into account time bonuses for high finishes and intermediate sprints, and time penalties for breaking the rules.

The color pink was chosen because La Gazzetta dello Sport, the sports newspaper that created the Giro, was (and, as of 2025, is) printed on pink paper. In comparison, the leader of the general classification in the Tour de France is awarded a yellow jersey, which originally corresponds with the yellow newsprint of L'Auto, the newspaper that created the Tour de France.

== See also ==
- List of Giro d'Italia general classification winners
- Pink jersey statistics
