= 2016 Team Sky season =

Team Sky
- 2016 season
- UCI code: SKY
- Status: UCI WorldTeam
- World Tour Rank: 3rd (1187 points)
- Manager: Dave Brailsford
- Main sponsor(s): Sky
- Based: National Cycling Centre; Manchester; England
- Bicycles: Pinarello
- Groupset: Shimano

Season victories
- One-day races: 4
- Stage race overall: 8
- Stage race stages: 24
- Grand Tours: 1
- National Championships: 3
- Most wins: Chris Froome (6 wins)
- Best ranked rider: Chris Froome (5th)

The 2016 season for Team Sky began in January at the Tour Down Under.

As a UCI WorldTeam, they were automatically invited and obliged to send a squad to every event in the UCI World Tour.

== Team roster ==
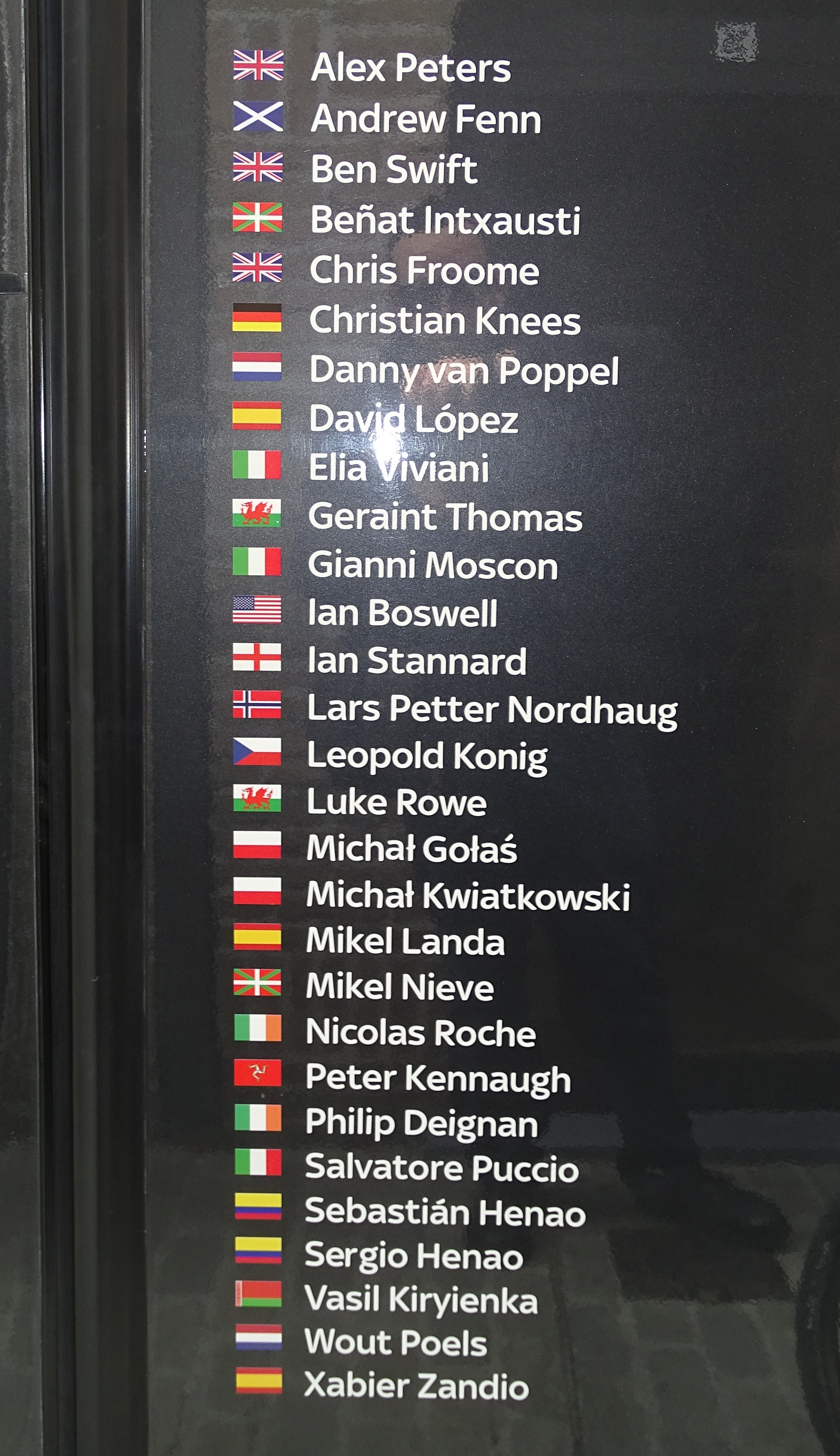
The 2016 team, as displayed on one of the team buses

As of 9 August 2016

Rider	Date of birth
Ian Boswell (USA)	7 February 1991 (aged 25)
Philip Deignan (IRL)	7 September 1983 (aged 32)
Owain Doull (Note: Doull joined the team on 1 August as a stagiaire, from WIGGINS.) (GBR)	17 October 1995 (aged 20)
Andrew Fenn (GBR)	1 July 1990 (aged 26)
Chris Froome (GBR)	20 May 1985 (aged 31)
Michał Gołaś (POL)	29 April 1984 (aged 32)
Sebastián Henao (COL)	5 August 1993 (aged 23)
Sergio Henao (COL)	10 December 1987 (aged 28)
Beñat Intxausti (ESP)	20 March 1986 (aged 30)
Peter Kennaugh (GBR)	15 June 1989 (aged 27)
Vasil Kiryienka (BLR)	28 June 1981 (aged 35)
Christian Knees (GER)	5 March 1981 (aged 35)
Michał Kwiatkowski (POL)	2 June 1990 (aged 26)
Mikel Landa (ESP)	3 December 1989 (aged 26)
Leopold König (CZE)	15 November 1987 (aged 28)

Rider	Date of birth
David López (ESP)	13 May 1981 (aged 35)
Gianni Moscon (ITA)	20 April 1994 (aged 22)
Mikel Nieve (ESP)	26 May 1984 (aged 32)
Lars Petter Nordhaug (NOR)	14 May 1984 (aged 32)
Alex Peters (GBR)	31 March 1994 (aged 22)
Wout Poels (NED)	1 October 1987 (aged 28)
Salvatore Puccio (ITA)	31 August 1989 (aged 26)
Nicolas Roche (IRL)	3 July 1984 (aged 32)
Luke Rowe (GBR)	10 March 1990 (aged 26)
Ian Stannard (GBR)	25 May 1987 (aged 29)
Ben Swift (GBR)	5 November 1987 (aged 28)
Geraint Thomas (GBR)	25 May 1986 (aged 30)
Danny van Poppel (NED)	26 July 1993 (aged 23)
Elia Viviani (ITA)	7 February 1989 (aged 27)
Xabier Zandio (ESP)	17 March 1977 (aged 39)

Riders who joined the team for the 2016 season
Rider	2015 team
Michał Gołaś	Etixx–Quick-Step
Beñat Intxausti	Movistar Team
Michał Kwiatkowski	Etixx–Quick-Step
Mikel Landa	Astana
Gianni Moscon	neo-pro (Zalf-Euromobil)
Alex Peters	neo-pro (SEG Racing)
Danny van Poppel	Trek Factory Racing

Riders who left the team during or after the 2015 season
Rider	2016 team
Nathan Earle	Drapac Professional Cycling
Bernhard Eisel	Team Dimension Data
Danny Pate	Rally Cycling
Richie Porte	BMC Racing Team
Kanstantsin Siutsou	Team Dimension Data
Christopher Sutton	Retired
Bradley Wiggins	WIGGINS

== Season victories ==
Date	Race	Competition	Rider	Country	Location
24 January	Tour Down Under, Mountains classification	UCI World Tour	Sergio Henao (COL)	Australia	Adelaide
31 January	Cadel Evans Great Ocean Road Race	UCI Oceania Tour	Peter Kennaugh (GBR)	Australia	Geelong
3 February	Volta a la Comunitat Valenciana, Stage 1	UCI Europe Tour	Wout Poels (NED)	Spain	Oropesa del Mar
4 February	Herald Sun Tour, Stage 1	UCI Oceania Tour	Peter Kennaugh (GBR)	Australia	Healesville
4 February	Dubai Tour, Stage 2	UCI Asia Tour	Elia Viviani (ITA)	United Arab Emirates	Dubai
6 February	Volta a la Comunitat Valenciana, Stage 4	UCI Europe Tour	Wout Poels (NED)	Spain	Xorret de Catí
7 February	Herald Sun Tour, Stage 4	UCI Oceania Tour	Chris Froome (GBR)	Australia	Arthurs Seat, Victoria
7 February	Herald Sun Tour, Overall	UCI Oceania Tour	Chris Froome (GBR)	Australia	
7 February	Herald Sun Tour, Mountains classification	UCI Oceania Tour	Chris Froome (GBR)	Australia	
7 February	Herald Sun Tour, Teams classification	UCI Oceania Tour	(Note: The riders on the squad were Chris Froome, Ian Boswell, Salvatore Puccio, Peter Kennaugh, Sebastián Henao and Luke Rowe)	Australia	
7 February	Volta a la Comunitat Valenciana, Overall	UCI Europe Tour	Wout Poels (NED)	Spain	
7 February	Volta a la Comunitat Valenciana, Points classification	UCI Europe Tour	Wout Poels (NED)	Spain	
7 February	Volta a la Comunitat Valenciana, Mountains classification	UCI Europe Tour	Wout Poels (NED)	Spain	
7 February	Volta a la Comunitat Valenciana, Teams classification	UCI Europe Tour	(Note: The riders on the squad were Wout Poels, Beñat Intxausti, Leopold König, Mikel Nieve, Vasil Kiryienka, Alex Peters, David Lopez and Nicolas Roche)	Spain	
21 February	Volta ao Algarve, Overall	UCI Europe Tour	Geraint Thomas (GBR)	Portugal	
21 February	Vuelta an Andalucía, Points classification	UCI Europe Tour	Ben Swift (GBR)	Spain	
6 March	UCI Oceania Tour, Individual classification	UCI Oceania Tour	Peter Kennaugh (GBR)		
6 March	UCI Oceania Tour, Teams classification	UCI Oceania Tour	(Note: This award is calculated by adding the points earned by a team's top five riders in the individual standings. Those five riders were Peter Kennaugh, Chris Froome, Ben Swift Luke Rowe, and Sebastián Henao)		
13 March	Paris–Nice, Overall	UCI World Tour	Geraint Thomas (GBR)	France	
25 March	Volta a Catalunya, Stage 5	UCI World Tour	Wout Poels (NED)	Spain	Valls
25 March	E3 Harelbeke	UCI World Tour	Michał Kwiatkowski (POL)	Belgium	Harelbeke
27 March	Settimana Internazionale Coppi e Bartali, Teams classification	UCI Europe Tour	(Note: The riders on the squad were Philip Deignan, Sebastián Henao, Mikel Landa, Xavier Zandio, Danny van Poppel, Alex Peters, David Lopez and Gianni Moscon)	Italy	
30 March	Three Days of De Panne, Stage 2	UCI Europe Tour	Elia Viviani (ITA)	Belgium	Koksijde
31 March	Three Days of De Panne, Sprints classification	UCI Europe Tour	Danny van Poppel (NED)	Belgium	
5 April	Tour of the Basque Country, Stage 2	UCI World Tour	Mikel Landa (ESP)	Spain	Amurrio-Baranbio
9 April	Tour of the Basque Country, Points classification	UCI World Tour	Sergio Henao (COL)	Spain	
9 April	Tour of the Basque Country, Teams classification	UCI World Tour	(Note: The riders on the squad were Sergio Henao, Sebastián Henao, Mikel Landa, Xavier Zandio, Lars Petter Nordhaug, David Lopez, Philip Deignan and Vasil Kiryienka)	Spain	
20 April	Giro del Trentino, Stage 2	UCI Europe Tour	Mikel Landa (ESP)	Austria	Anras
22 April	Giro del Trentino, Overall	UCI Europe Tour	Mikel Landa (ESP)	Italy	
22 April	Giro del Trentino, Mountains classification	UCI Europe Tour	Mikel Landa (ESP)	Italy	
24 April	Liège–Bastogne–Liège	UCI World Tour	Wout Poels (NED)	Belgium	Ans
30 April	Tour de Yorkshire, Stage 2	UCI Europe Tour	Danny van Poppel (NED)	United Kingdom	Doncaster
30 April	Tour de Romandie, Stage 4	UCI World Tour	Chris Froome (GBR)	Switzerland	Villars-sur-Ollon
20 May	Giro d'Italia, Stage 13	UCI World Tour	Mikel Nieve (ESP)	Italy	Cividale del Friuli
29 May	Giro d'Italia, Mountains classification	UCI World Tour	Mikel Nieve (ESP)	Italy	
10 June	Critérium du Dauphiné, Stage 5	UCI World Tour	Chris Froome (GBR)	France	Vaujany
12 June	Critérium du Dauphiné, Overall	UCI World Tour	Chris Froome (GBR)	France	
12 June	Critérium du Dauphiné, Teams classification	UCI World Tour	(Note: The riders on the squad were Sergio Henao, Chris Froome, Mikel Landa, Michał Kwiatkowski, Wout Poels, Salvatore Puccio, Luke Rowe and Ian Stannard)	France	
9 July	Tour de France, Stage 8	UCI World Tour	Chris Froome (GBR)	France	Bagnères-de-Luchon
21 July	Tour de France, Stage 18	UCI World Tour	Chris Froome (GBR)	France	Megève
24 July	Tour de France, Overall	UCI World Tour	Chris Froome (GBR)	France	
2 August	Vuelta a Burgos, Stage 1	UCI Europe Tour	Danny van Poppel (NED)	Spain	Melgar de Fernamental
4 August	Vuelta a Burgos, Stage 3	UCI Europe Tour	Danny van Poppel (NED)	Spain	Villarcayo
6 August	Vuelta a Burgos, Points classification	UCI Europe Tour	Danny van Poppel (NED)	Spain	
12 August	Arctic Race of Norway, Stage 2	UCI Europe Tour	Danny van Poppel (NED)	Norway	Sandnessjøen
13 August	Arctic Race of Norway, Stage 3	UCI Europe Tour	Gianni Moscon (ITA)	Norway	Korgfjellet
14 August	Arctic Race of Norway, Overall	UCI Europe Tour	Gianni Moscon (ITA)	Norway	
14 August	Arctic Race of Norway, Young rider classification	UCI Europe Tour	Gianni Moscon (ITA)	Norway	
14 August	Arctic Race of Norway, Teams classification	UCI Europe Tour	(Note: The riders on the squad were Sebastián Henao, Gianni Moscon, Lars Petter Nordhaug, Danny van Poppel, Andrew Fenn and Ben Swift)	Norway	
20 August	Vuelta a España, Stage 1	UCI World Tour	Team Time Trial (Note: The winning riders were Chris Froome, Ian Boswell, Michał Gołaś, Peter Kennaugh, Christian Knees, Leopold König, Michał Kwiatkowski, Salvatore Puccio and David López)	Spain	Castrelo de Miño
31 August	Vuelta a España, Stage 11	UCI World Tour	Chris Froome (GBR)	Spain	Peña Cabarga
6 September	Tour of Britain, Stage 3	UCI Europe Tour	Ian Stannard (GBR)	United Kingdom	Tatton Park
9 September	Tour of Britain, Stage 6	UCI Europe Tour	Wout Poels (NED)	United Kingdom	Haytor
9 September	Vuelta a España, Stage 19	UCI World Tour	Chris Froome (GBR)	Spain	Calp
11 September	Tour of Britain, Teams classification	UCI Europe Tour	(Note: The riders on the squad were Elia Viviani, Ian Stannard, Wout Poels, Nicolas Roche, Ben Swift and Danny van Poppel)	United Kingdom	
23 October	Chrono des Nations	UCI Europe Tour	Vasil Kiryienka (BLR)	France	Les Herbiers

== National, Continental and World champions 2016 ==
Date	Discipline	Jersey	Rider	Country	Location
23 June	Czech National Time Trial Champion		Leopold König (CZE)	Czech Republic	Hodonín
23 June	Irish National Time Trial Champion Champion		Nicolas Roche (IRL)	Ireland	Kilcullen
26 June	Irish National Road Race Championships		Nicolas Roche (IRL)	Ireland	Kilcullen
