= 2015 Tirreno–Adriatico =

2015 UCI World Tour, race 3 of 28

Race details
- Dates: 11–17 March 2015
- Stages: 7
- Distance: 1,006.4 km (625.3 mi)
- Winning time: 25h 11' 16"

Results
Jersey awarded to the overall winner	Winner	Nairo Quintana (COL)	(Movistar Team)
	Second	Bauke Mollema (NED)	(Trek Factory Racing)
	Third	Rigoberto Urán (COL)	(Etixx–Quick-Step)
Jersey awarded to the points classification winner	Points	Peter Sagan (SVK)	(Tinkoff–Saxo)
Jersey awarded to the mountains classification winner	Mountains	Carlos Quintero (COL)	(Colombia)
Jersey awarded to the young rider classification winner	Young rider	Nairo Quintana (COL)	(Movistar Team)
	Team	Movistar Team	

The 2015 Tirreno–Adriatico was the 50th edition of the Tirreno–Adriatico stage race. It took place from 11 to 17 March and was the third race of the 2015 UCI World Tour. The race was one of the most important races in the early part of the cycling season and was used by riders preparing both for the Grand Tours and for the classics season.

The route of the 2015 edition started and finished with individual time trials, one of which was rescheduled from a team time trial shortly before the race began. In between, the race consisted of two stages suitable for sprinters, one for puncheurs and two for climbers. The key stage of the race was stage 5, which involved a summit finish on Monte Terminillo. The defending champion from the 2014 edition was Alberto Contador (Tinkoff–Saxo), who was expected to be challenged by three of the strongest stage racers in the world, Nairo Quintana (Movistar Team), Vincenzo Nibali (Astana) and Chris Froome (Team Sky). Froome, however, pulled out shortly before the race.

The first individual time trial was won by Adriano Malori (Movistar Team), who kept the lead for the first two stages. Greg Van Avermaet (BMC Racing Team) and Wout Poels (Team Sky) won the next two stages, each taking the race lead for one day. The queen stage to Monte Terminillo was won by Quintana, who took the overall lead and was able to defend it to the end of the race. Bauke Mollema (Trek Factory Racing) finished second, 18 seconds behind Quintana, with Rigoberto Urán (Etixx–Quick-Step) third.

Peter Sagan (Tinkoff–Saxo) won the points classification, after he won one stage and finished in the top ten on three others. The mountains classification was won by Carlos Quintero (Colombia), while Quintana won the young rider classification as a consequence of his overall race victory.

== Teams ==
As Tirreno-Adriatico was a UCI World Tour event, all 17 UCI WorldTeams were invited automatically and were obliged to send a squad. Five Professional Continental teams received wildcard invitations.

WorldTeams

- AG2R La Mondiale
- Astana
- BMC Racing Team
- Etixx–Quick-Step
- FDJ
- IAM Cycling
- Lampre–Merida
- Lotto–Soudal
- Movistar Team
- Orica–GreenEDGE
- Cannondale–Garmin
- Team Giant–Alpecin
- Team Katusha
- LottoNL–Jumbo
- Team Sky
- Tinkoff–Saxo
- Trek Factory Racing

Wildcard teams

- Bardiani–CSF
- Bora–Argon 18
- Team Europcar
- MTN–Qhubeka
- Colombia

== Pre-race favourites ==
The key stages on the general classification were expected to be the time trials and the summit finish. The race was originally expected to be the first contest of the season between the four riders expected to contest the Tour de France: the 2014 Tirreno–Adriatico champion Alberto Contador (Tinkoff–Saxo), the 2013 Tirreno–Adriatico champion Vincenzo Nibali (Astana), Nairo Quintana (Movistar Team) and Chris Froome (Team Sky). Shortly before the race, however, Froome withdrew on account of a chest infection (he had also withdrawn at the last minute in 2013). Following Froome's withdrawal, Contador was seen as the main favourite for the race; he had demonstrated his form when he and Froome fought a close battle in the Vuelta a Andalucía weeks earlier. Nibali, however, had not yet shown good form in the 2015 season, while Quintana had not raced for several weeks following a crash. Other riders considered to have a chance in the general classification included Rigoberto Urán (Etixx–Quick-Step), Joaquim Rodríguez (Team Katusha), Dan Martin (Cannondale–Garmin) and Thibaut Pinot (FDJ).

As well as losing Froome from the general classification battle, the race also lost one of the riders expected to challenge for stage wins. Marcel Kittel (Team Giant–Alpecin) withdrew from the race with a virus. The principal sprinters left in the race were Mark Cavendish (Etixx–Quick-Step), Elia Viviani (Team Sky), Tyler Farrar (MTN–Qhubeka) and Sam Bennett (Bora–Argon 18). The race was also notable as the first time when Peter Sagan raced alongside Contador in the Tinkoff–Saxo team; Sagan was expected to feature both on the sprint stages and on the uphill finish on stage 3.

== Route ==
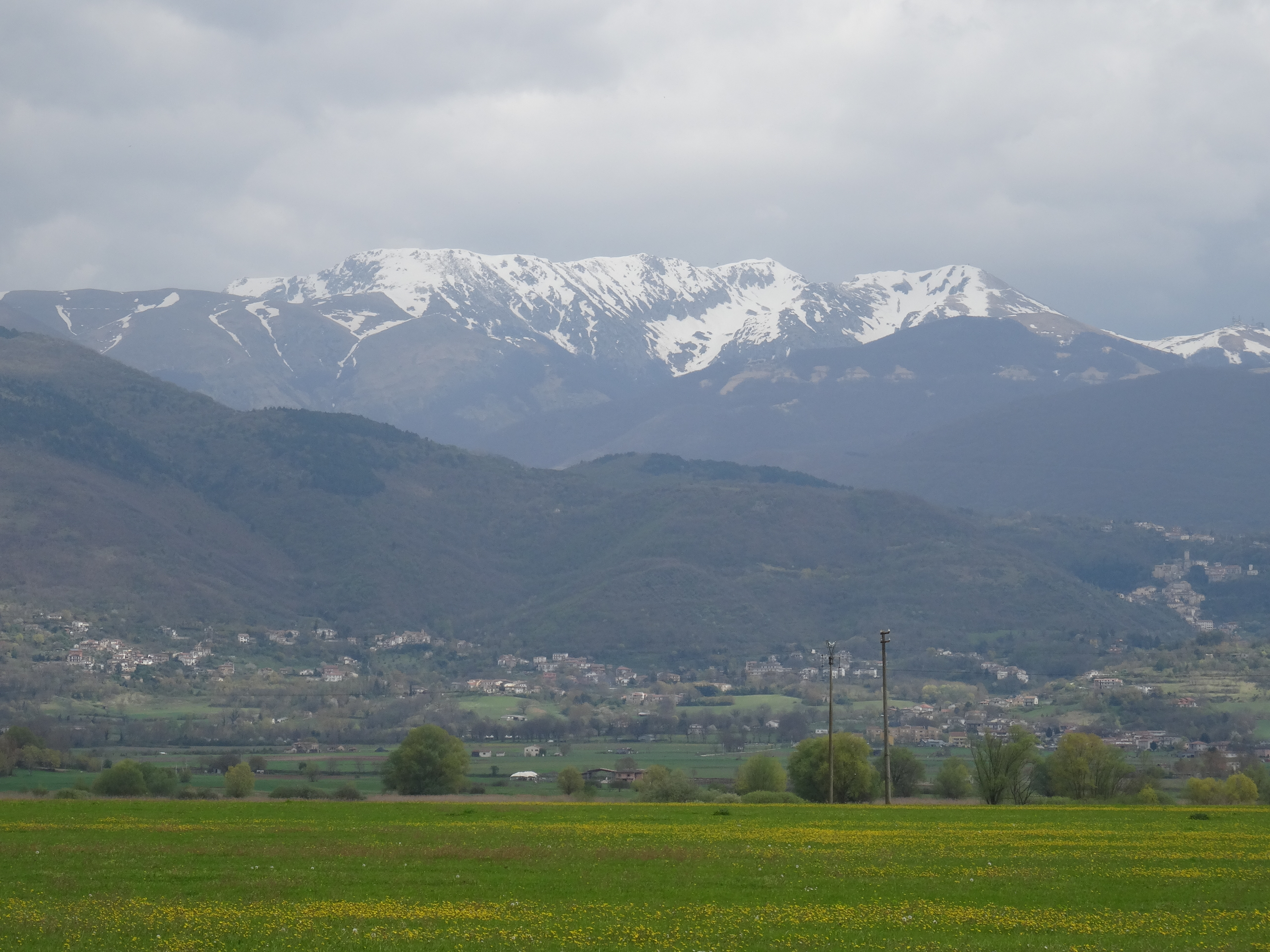
Monte Terminillo, the location of the summit finish on stage 5

Tirreno–Adriatico was an important race in the early part of the road cycling season. It was the third UCI World Tour race of the year, running at the same time as Paris–Nice. The two races compete for prestige and for the best riders. Tirreno–Adriatico was an important test as part of riders' preparations both for the Grand Tours and for the classics races, such as Milan–San Remo. The race generally took the riders east across central Italy, from the Tyrrhenian Sea to the Adriatic Sea – the race is therefore sometimes known as the "race of the two seas" – and the Italian names of the seas give the name Tirreno–Adriatico.

The race was originally intended to begin with a 22-kilometre (13.7 mi) team time trial around Lido di Camaiore. This was expected to be a difficult test and to result in significant gaps in the general classification. Heavy wind and rain in the week before the race, however, forced the race organisers, RCS Sport, to change this stage. Though the start and finish lines were unchanged, the stage was shortened, first to 5.7 kilometres (3.5 mi), then to 5.4 kilometres (3.4 mi); it was also changed to be an individual time trial. This was expected to result in smaller gaps; it was a particular blow to the Orica–GreenEDGE team, who had based most of their squad around the team time trial.

Stage 2 was a fairly flat stage, expected to suit the sprinters preparing for Milan–San Remo. Stage 3 was also unlikely to change the general classification, though it included a steep uphill finish. The key stages, however, came on the weekend. Stage 4 was a difficult, mountainous stage with a downhill finish. The following day's route had a summit finish on the 16-kilometre (10-mile) climb of Monte Terminillo. Stage 6 was another fairly flat stage and the race ended on the Adriatic coast with another individual time trial in San Benedetto del Tronto.

Stage characteristics and winners
Stage	Date	Course	Distance	Type	Winner
1	11 March	Lido di Camaiore	~~22.7 km (14.1 mi)~~ 5.4 km (3.4 mi)	~~Team time trial~~ Individual time trial	Adriano Malori (ITA)
2	12 March	Camaiore to Cascina	153 km (95.1 mi)	Flat stage	Jens Debusschere (BEL)
3	13 March	Cascina to Arezzo	203 km (126.1 mi)	Hilly stage	Greg Van Avermaet (BEL)
4	14 March	Indicatore (Arezzo) to Castelraimondo	226 km (140.4 mi)	Medium-mountain stage	Wout Poels (NED)
5	15 March	Esanatoglia to Monte Terminillo	199 km (123.7 mi)	Mountain stage	Nairo Quintana (COL)
6	16 March	Rieti to Porto Sant'Elpidio	210 km (130.5 mi)	Hilly stage	Peter Sagan (SVK)
7	17 March	San Benedetto del Tronto	10 km (6.2 mi)	Individual time trial	Fabian Cancellara (SUI)

== Stages ==
=== Stage 1 ===
11 March 2015 – Lido di Camaiore, 5.4 km (3.4 mi), individual time trial (ITT)

Stage 1 was originally intended to be a 22.7-kilometre (14.1-mile) team time trial, but bad weather (high wind and torrential rain) in the week leading up to the event made this impossible. The race organisers reduced the race to a 5.7-kilometre (3.5-mile) individual time trial; on the day of the race, this was shortened by a further 300 metres (980 ft). The course was based in the Lido di Camaiore holiday resort on the Tyrrhenian coast and was entirely flat. The out-and-back course meant that the riders had a tailwind on the first half of the course and a headwind on the second.

The early benchmark time was set by Daniel Oss (BMC Racing Team), who completed the course in 6' 08". A good time was also set by Peter Sagan (Tinkoff–Saxo), whose time was 6' 10" and who was the best young rider in the stage. Sagan did well to set such a good time, since he hit a pavement early in his ride and nearly fell. Oss kept the lead for a long time, but was eventually overtaken by Matthias Brändle (IAM Cycling). Brändle, however, was immediately overtaken by Adriano Malori (Movistar Team), the Italian national time trial champion – who won the closing time trial of the 2014 Tirreno–Adriatico – with a time of 6' 04". Maciej Bodnar (Tinkoff–Saxo), Steve Cummings (MTN–Qhubeka) and Greg Van Avermaet (BMC Racing Team) all came close to Malori's time, but were unable to beat it. The principal favourite for the stage, former world time trial champion Fabian Cancellara (Trek Factory Racing), finished one second behind Malori, who therefore won the stage, winning both the blue jersey of the overall leader of the race and the red jersey of the points classification leader.

Rigoberto Urán (Etixx–Quick-Step) was the fastest of the general classification contenders, finishing 19th on the stage, 10" behind Malori. Vincenzo Nibali (Astana) was the first of the three major favourites for the race, one second behind Urán. Alberto Contador (Tinkoff–Saxo) and Nairo Quintana (Movistar Team) both lost time.

Stage 1 result and General classification after Stage 1
Rank	Rider	Team	Time
1	Adriano Malori (ITA)	Movistar Team	6' 04"
2	Fabian Cancellara (SUI)	Trek Factory Racing	+ 1"
3	Greg Van Avermaet (BEL)	BMC Racing Team	+ 2"
4	Maciej Bodnar (POL)	Tinkoff–Saxo	+ 2"
5	Matthias Brändle (AUT)	IAM Cycling	+ 2"
6	Daniel Oss (ITA)	BMC Racing Team	+ 4"
7	Ramūnas Navardauskas (LTU)	Cannondale–Garmin	+ 5"
8	Steve Cummings (GBR)	MTN–Qhubeka	+ 6"
9	Peter Sagan (SVK)	Tinkoff–Saxo	+ 6"
10	Johan Le Bon (FRA)	FDJ	+ 8"

=== Stage 2 ===
12 March 2015 – Camaiore to Cascina, 153 km (95.1 mi)

The second stage of the race was a 153-kilometre (95-mile) route from Camaiore, the location of stage 1, to Cascina. The course started with one and a half laps of a circuit around Camaiore, including the only two categorised climbs of the day, before heading south-east towards the city of Lucca. After leaving Lucca, the course turned west, then headed north to enter Cascina. In Cascina, the riders completed two laps of a 20.7-kilometre (12.9-mile) finishing circuit. Although the final circuit was flat, there were three roundabouts, a sharp turn and a bridge in the final 5 kilometres (3.1 miles).

An early breakaway was formed on the circuit around Camaiore. This was made up of seven riders: Edoardo Zardini (Bardiani–CSF), Danilo Wyss (BMC Racing Team), Cristiano Salerno and Patrick Konrad (Bora–Argon 18), Camilo Castiblanco, Carlos Quintero (both Colombia) and Martijn Keizer (LottoNL–Jumbo). The breakaway built up a lead of over six minutes and took all the mountains classification points. Wyss won the first ahead of Quintero; Quintero beat Wyss on the second climb. Wyss went on to take the jersey for the leader of the mountains classification thanks to his better general classification standing after the stage. The breakaway was carefully controlled by the sprinters' teams − principally Etixx–Quick-Step and Tinkoff–Saxo − and with 91 kilometres (57 miles) remaining the breakaway had less than three minutes' lead. The gap was reduced to less than 90 seconds as the peloton entered the finishing circuit with 41.4 kilometres (25.7 miles) remaining.

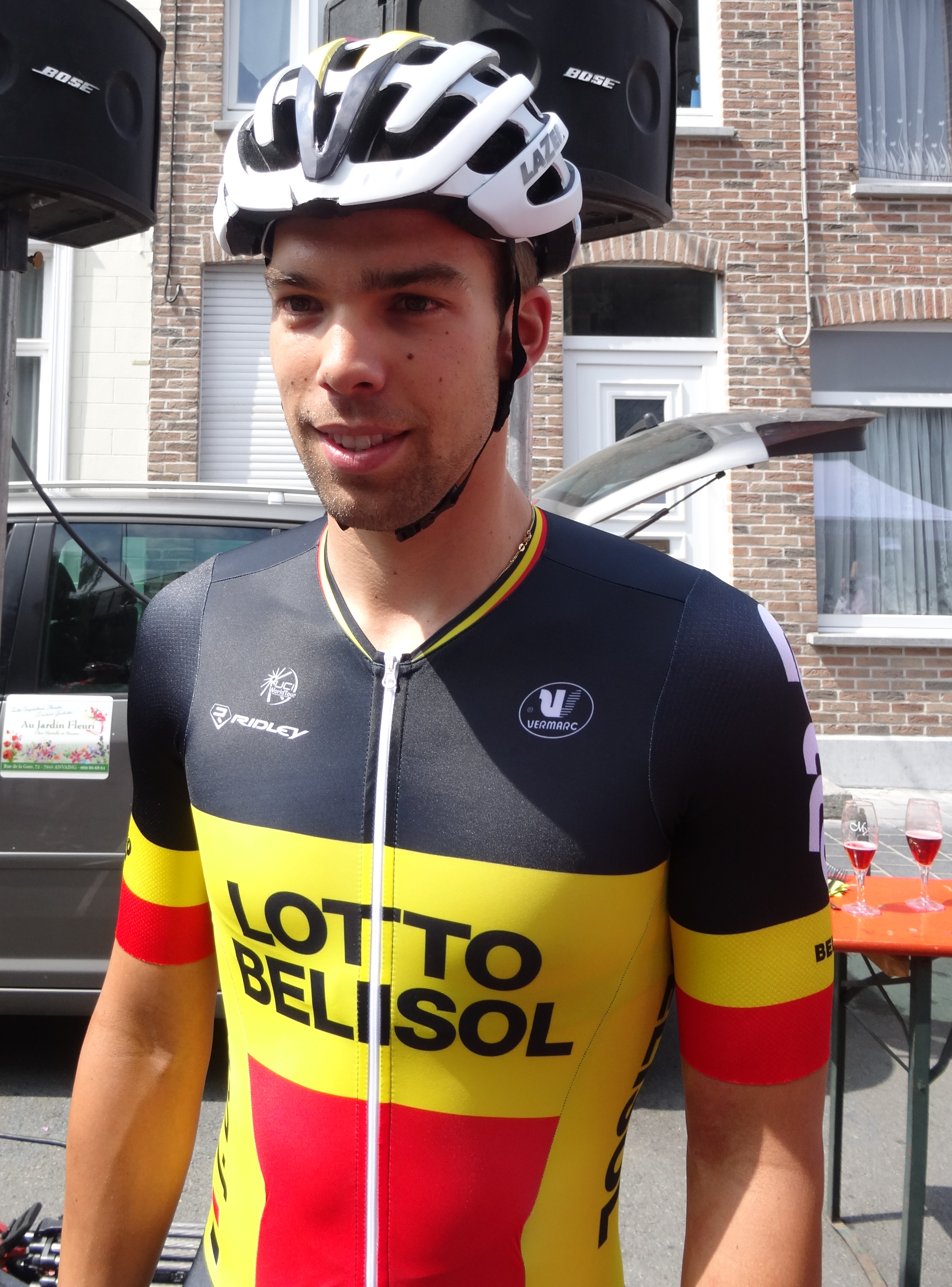
Jens Debusschere (photographed in 2014), the winner of stage 2

About 10 kilometres (6.2 miles) later, Zardini attacked and was followed by Quintero and Salerno. These three riders continued alone; they had less than a minute's lead as they entered the final lap of the circuit with 20.7 kilometres (12.9 miles) remaining and were caught soon afterwards. There was a crash in the peloton 11 kilometres (6.8 miles) from the finish, which eliminated Matteo Pelucchi (Lampre–Merida) from contention, as well as causing some delay for Orica–GreenEDGE's general classification rider Adam Yates.

Going into the final kilometres of the race, several teams were competing at the front of the peloton. MTN–Qhubeka, Tinkoff–Saxo and Etixx–Quick-Step all tried to set up their sprinters, with Zdeněk Štybar particularly prominent. MTN–Qhubeka led the group under the flamme rouge with 1 kilometre (0.62 miles) remaining, as Edvald Boasson Hagen attempted to lead out his teammate Tyler Farrar. In the final few hundred metres, however, there was a large crash. Mark Cavendish (Etixx–Quick-Step) suddenly moved right, clashing wheels with Elia Viviani (Team Sky). Cavendish was unable to continue sprinting, while Viviani was thrown from his bike while riding at over 70 km/h (43 mph). Several other riders were brought down in the incident, including Sacha Modolo (Lampre–Merida) and Luka Mezgec (Team Giant–Alpecin). This crash left a small group of 12 riders to contest the stage finish. Jens Debusschere (Lotto–Soudal), riding in the colours of the Belgian national champion, outsprinted Peter Sagan (Tinkoff–Saxo) on the line; Sam Bennett (Bora–Argon 18) finished third. Thanks to the time bonus he won for coming second, Sagan moved up into second place overall, on the same time as Malori. Debusschere, meanwhile, moved into the lead of the points classification.

It was revealed after the stage that Cavendish's sudden movement had been caused by his chain falling off the big chainring. The loss of power caused him to swerve right and Viviani was unable to avoid him. Viviani suffered cuts and abrasions from the crash, though he avoided any broken bones and was able to complete the stage. Etixx–Quick-Step were keen to investigate the incident, as Tom Boonen had suffered a similar problem in the Tour of Qatar.

Stage 2 result
Rank	Rider	Team	Time
1	Jens Debusschere (BEL)	Lotto–Soudal	3h 30' 18"
2	Peter Sagan (SVK)	Tinkoff–Saxo	+ 0"
3	Sam Bennett (IRL)	Bora–Argon 18	+ 0"
4	Alexander Porsev (RUS)	Team Katusha	+ 0"
5	Tyler Farrar (USA)	MTN–Qhubeka	+ 0"
6	Magnus Cort (DEN)	Orica–GreenEDGE	+ 0"
7	Roger Kluge (GER)	IAM Cycling	+ 0"
8	Nicola Ruffoni (ITA)	Bardiani–CSF	+ 0"
9	Zak Dempster (AUS)	Bora–Argon 18	+ 0"
10	Mark Renshaw (AUS)	Etixx–Quick-Step	+ 0"

General classification after Stage 2
Rank	Rider	Team	Time
1	Adriano Malori (ITA)	Movistar Team	3h 36' 22"
2	Peter Sagan (SVK)	Tinkoff–Saxo	+ 0"
3	Fabian Cancellara (SUI)	Trek Factory Racing	+ 1"
4	Greg Van Avermaet (BEL)	BMC Racing Team	+ 2"
5	Matthias Brändle (AUT)	IAM Cycling	+ 2"
6	Maciej Bodnar (POL)	Tinkoff–Saxo	+ 2"
7	Daniel Oss (ITA)	BMC Racing Team	+ 4"
8	Ramūnas Navardauskas (LTU)	Cannondale–Garmin	+ 5"
9	Steve Cummings (GBR)	MTN–Qhubeka	+ 6"
10	Martijn Keizer (NED)	LottoNL–Jumbo	+ 7"

=== Stage 3 ===
13 March 2015 – Cascina to Arezzo, 203 km (126.1 mi)

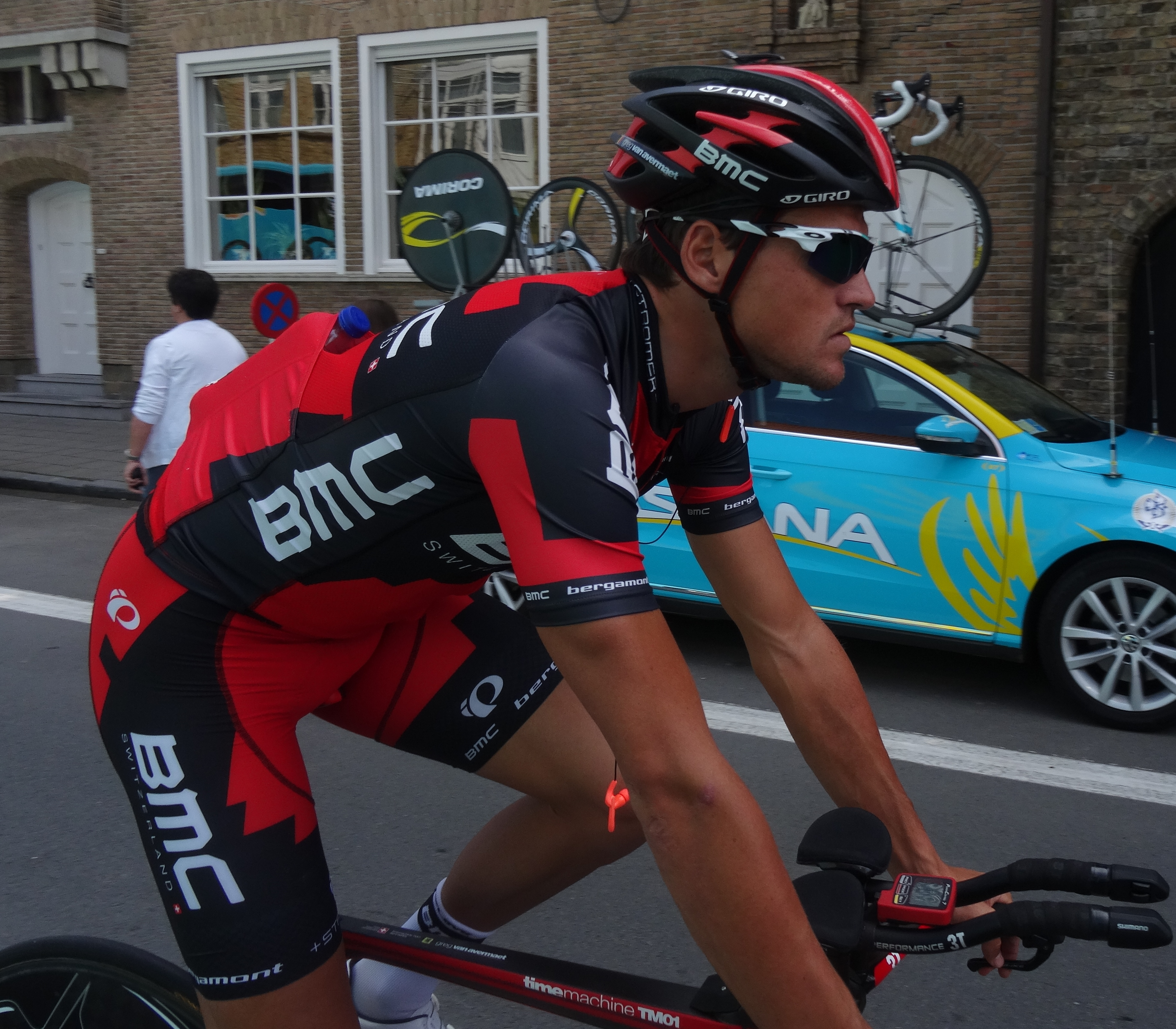
Greg Van Avermaet (photographed in 2014), winner of stage 3

Stage 3 took the riders on a 203-kilometre (126-mile) route from Cascina to Arezzo. The route was very similar to stage 3 of the previous year's race, with a long route east, including two categorised climbs, and a finishing circuit in Arezzo. In the 2015 edition, the riders did five laps of a 15-kilometre (9.3-mile) circuit. The final 1 kilometre (0.62 miles) of the circuit was difficult: it was uphill, with one section of 11%, there was a narrow gate and one section of road was cobbled. On the previous year's stage, Peter Sagan had beaten Michał Kwiatkowski (Etixx–Quick-Step) in the sprint.

The early breakaway was formed by Nicola Boem (Bardiani–CSF), Carlos Quintero (Colombia), Chad Haga (Team Giant–Alpecin), Danilo Wyss (BMC Racing Team) and Rick Flens (LottoNL–Jumbo). Wyss, the leader of the mountains classification, won both mountain sprints, with Quintero behind him both times. With 95 kilometres (59 miles) left to race, the breakaway had a five-minute lead. Sagan's Tinkoff–Saxo team, however, controlled the race carefully: Matteo Tosatto and Christopher Juul-Jensen both put in long efforts on the front of the peloton to bring the group back. The lead was less than a minute with 30 kilometres (19 miles) left to race and the breakaway split. 18.5 kilometres (11.5 miles) from the end, Boem and Haga were the last riders of the group to be caught.

Tinkoff–Saxo controlled the peloton in the following kilometres, with BMC Racing Team, Team Sky and IAM Cycling close behind. Sagan's teammates, however, were quickly running out and, with 4 kilometres (2.5 miles) remaining, he only had Maciej Bodnar left to support him. BMC, meanwhile, had several riders left to support Greg Van Avermaet. Van Avermaet was therefore perfectly positioned as the climb began and attacked towards the top. He won a small gap ahead of Zdeněk Štybar (Etixx–Quick-Step) and was able to hold on to his lead to take the stage victory. Sagan was the quickest in the final metres, but he had started too far back; although he was able to pass Stybar to finish second on the stage, he was unable to catch Van Avermaet. Sagan did, however, take the lead in the points classification. Van Avermaet took over the lead in the general classification thanks to the bonus seconds he won on the stage.

Stage 3 result
Rank	Rider	Team	Time
1	Greg Van Avermaet (BEL)	BMC Racing Team	4h 58' 17"
2	Peter Sagan (SVK)	Tinkoff–Saxo	+ 0"
3	Zdeněk Štybar (CZE)	Etixx–Quick-Step	+ 0"
4	Filippo Pozzato (ITA)	Lampre–Merida	+ 0"
5	Fabian Cancellara (SUI)	Trek Factory Racing	+ 0"
6	Simon Geschke (GER)	Team Giant–Alpecin	+ 0"
7	Paul Martens (GER)	LottoNL–Jumbo	+ 0"
8	Andriy Hrivko (UKR)	Astana	+ 0"
9	Rigoberto Urán (COL)	Etixx–Quick-Step	+ 0"
10	Wout Poels (NED)	Team Sky	+ 0"

General classification after Stage 3
Rank	Rider	Team	Time
1	Greg Van Avermaet (BEL)	BMC Racing Team	8h 34' 31"
2	Peter Sagan (SVK)	Tinkoff–Saxo	+ 2"
3	Adriano Malori (ITA)	Movistar Team	+ 8"
4	Fabian Cancellara (SUI)	Trek Factory Racing	+ 9"
5	Matthias Brändle (AUT)	IAM Cycling	+ 10"
6	Ramūnas Navardauskas (LTU)	Cannondale–Garmin	+ 13"
7	Steve Cummings (GBR)	MTN–Qhubeka	+ 14"
8	Jonathan Castroviejo (ESP)	Movistar Team	+ 16"
9	Edvald Boasson Hagen (NOR)	MTN–Qhubeka	+ 16"
10	Andriy Hrivko (UKR)	Astana	+ 17"

=== Stage 4 ===
14 March 2015 – Indicatore (Arezzo) to Castelraimondo, 226 km (140.4 mi)

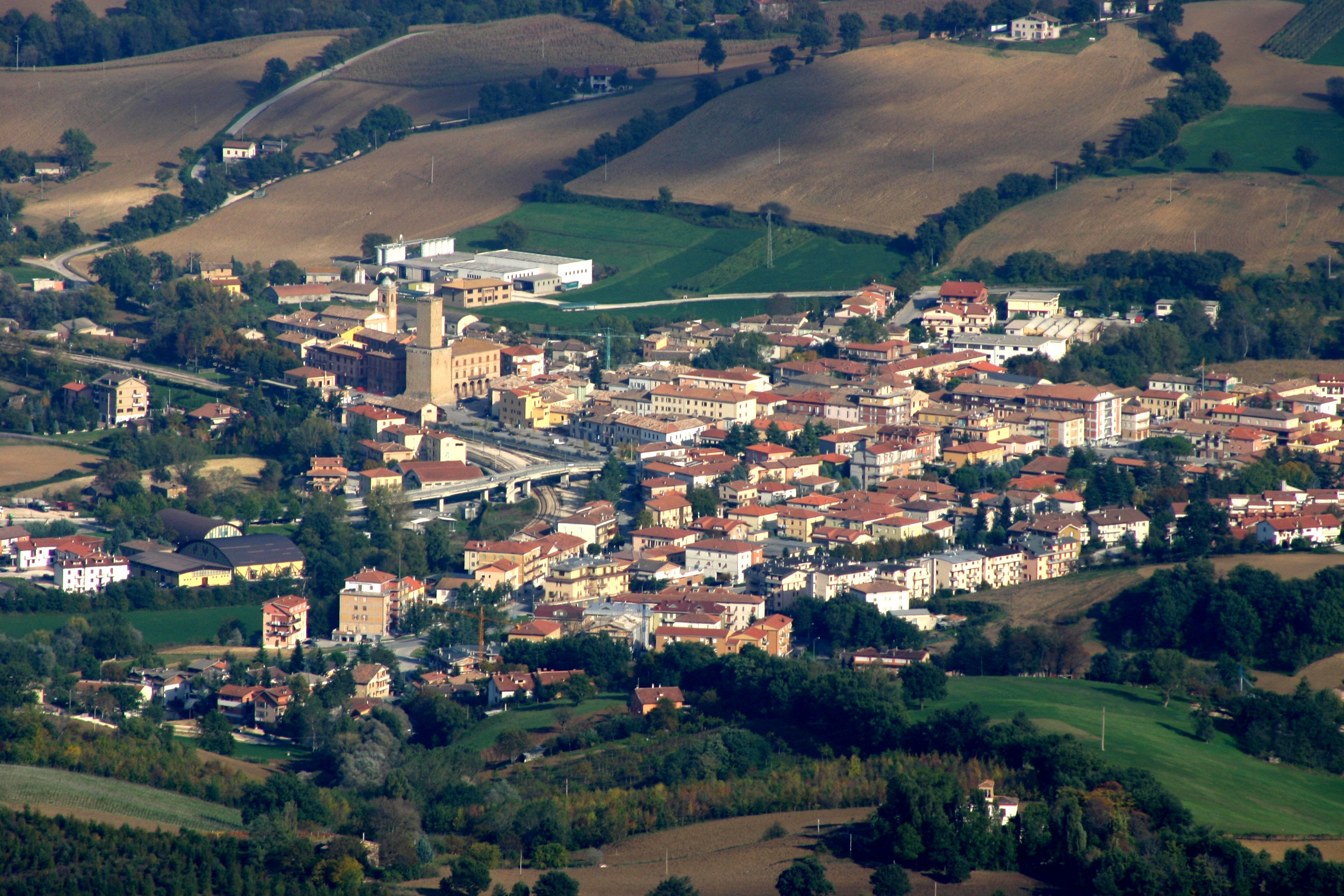
Castelraimondo, the finish of stage 4

The fourth stage of the race was the longest stage of the race at 226 kilometres (140 miles). The route took the riders from Arezzo east, with intermediate sprints in Gubbio and Fabriano and two classified climbs. The riders then entered a 11.5-kilometre (7.1-mile) finishing circuit around the town of Castelraimondo. The riders did two laps of the circuit, each of which included the climb of the Crispiero, a 3-kilometre (1.9-mile) climb with an average gradient of over 9%. Following the climb, there was a technical 6-kilometre (3.7-mile) descent into the stage finish. The early breakaway was formed by two riders from Orica–GreenEDGE, Mathew Hayman and Luke Durbridge. The two riders built up a lead of over seven minutes ahead of the main peloton, though it seemed that both riders had crashed at some point on the route, away from the view of the television cameras. Two separate chasing groups formed: one was made up of Nathan Haas (Cannondale–Garmin) and Carlos Quintero (Colombia); the other was formed by Walter Pedraza, Miguel Ángel Rubiano (both Colombia) and Manuel Quinziato (BMC Racing Team). Neither of the chase groups was successful, however, and the lead pair stayed clear until Durbridge tired with 21 kilometres (13 miles) remaining. Hayman was caught soon afterwards.

On the first climb of the Crispiero, Giovanni Visconti (Movistar Team) attacked along with Michele Scarponi (Astana) and Julián Arredondo (Trek Factory Racing). Visconti was the first to cross the summit, with Daniel Moreno (Team Katusha) catching the group on the descent. The riders were caught, however, on the flat section between the two climbs, with approximately 10 kilometres (6.2 miles) still to race. The peloton was led at this point by Tinkoff–Saxo. After the group was caught, AG2R La Mondiale came forwards in support of Domenico Pozzovivo. Alexis Vuillermoz led the peloton into the foot of the final climb, dropping Van Avermaet, the race leader, with about 8 kilometres (5.0 miles) left. Giampaolo Caruso (Team Katusha) was the next to attack. As he was approaching the summit and looking at the group behind, Wout Poels (Team Sky) attacked and came past on Caruso's left.

Poels therefore entered the descent off the Crispiero alone, with several seconds lead over the main group. The main favourites for the general classification hesitated before taking up the chase, allowing Poels to build a lead. Eventually, Katusha attempted to chase him down, but Poels was able to make the most of the difficult descent and built a 20-second lead. Although this was reduced on the way to the finish, Poels held on to take the win, his first for Team Sky. He also moved into the overall lead of the race, with a 17-second advantage over Rigoberto Urán (Etixx–Quick-Step), who had won the sprint for second place in the group behind.

Poels, who was leading Sky in the absence of Chris Froome, expressed hope after the stage that he would be able to defend his race lead on the summit finish the following day. In the other classifications, Thibaut Pinot (FDJ) moved into the lead of the young riders competition, as he moved up to fourth place in the general classification. Quintero, having been part of the breakaway for the third day running, took enough mountain points on the stage to move into the lead of the mountains classification.

Stage 4 result
Rank	Rider	Team	Time
1	Wout Poels (NED)	Team Sky	5h 53' 38"
2	Rigoberto Urán (COL)	Etixx–Quick-Step	+ 14"
3	Joaquim Rodríguez (ESP)	Team Katusha	+ 14"
4	Alexis Vuillermoz (FRA)	AG2R La Mondiale	+ 14"
5	Rinaldo Nocentini (ITA)	AG2R La Mondiale	+ 14"
6	Roman Kreuziger (CZE)	Tinkoff–Saxo	+ 14"
7	Giampaolo Caruso (ITA)	Team Katusha	+ 14"
8	Nairo Quintana (COL)	Movistar Team	+ 14"
9	Jurgen Van den Broeck (BEL)	Lotto–Soudal	+ 14"
10	Adam Yates (GBR)	Orica–GreenEDGE	+ 14"

General classification after Stage 4
Rank	Rider	Team	Time
1	Wout Poels (NED)	Team Sky	14h 28' 18"
2	Rigoberto Urán (COL)	Etixx–Quick-Step	+ 17"
3	Steve Cummings (GBR)	MTN–Qhubeka	+ 26"
4	Thibaut Pinot (FRA)	FDJ	+ 26"
5	Roman Kreuziger (CZE)	Tinkoff–Saxo	+ 27"
6	Jonathan Castroviejo (ESP)	Movistar Team	+ 28"
7	Bauke Mollema (NED)	Trek Factory Racing	+ 28"
8	Peter Sagan (SVK)	Tinkoff–Saxo	+ 30"
9	Vincenzo Nibali (ITA)	Astana	+ 31"
10	Alberto Contador (ESP)	Tinkoff–Saxo	+ 32"

=== Stage 5 ===
15 March 2015 – Esanatoglia to Monte Terminillo, 199 km (123.7 mi)

Stage 5 was the queen stage of the 2015 Tirreno−Adriatico and the only summit finish of the race. It took the riders on a 199-kilometre (124-mile) course from Esanatoglia. The peloton first travelled south, crossing three significant climbs in the first 72 kilometres (45 miles). The middle of the stage was flat, as the riders travelled southwest towards Terni, but the final part of the stage was difficult. The route first passed through Rieti, then turned east towards the summit finish at a ski station on Monte Terminillo. The final climb was 16.1 kilometres (10.0 miles) in length, with an average gradient of 7.3% and a total ascent of 1,175 metres (3,855 ft). The steepest sections were in the first part of the climb (one section had a gradient of 12%); the rest of the climb had a steady incline, except for the final few hundred metres of false flat. The stage took place in cold, difficult conditions with temperatures below 0 °C (32 °F). There were rumours before the stage that it would have to be cancelled, but these were refuted by the race organisers and the stage took place as planned.

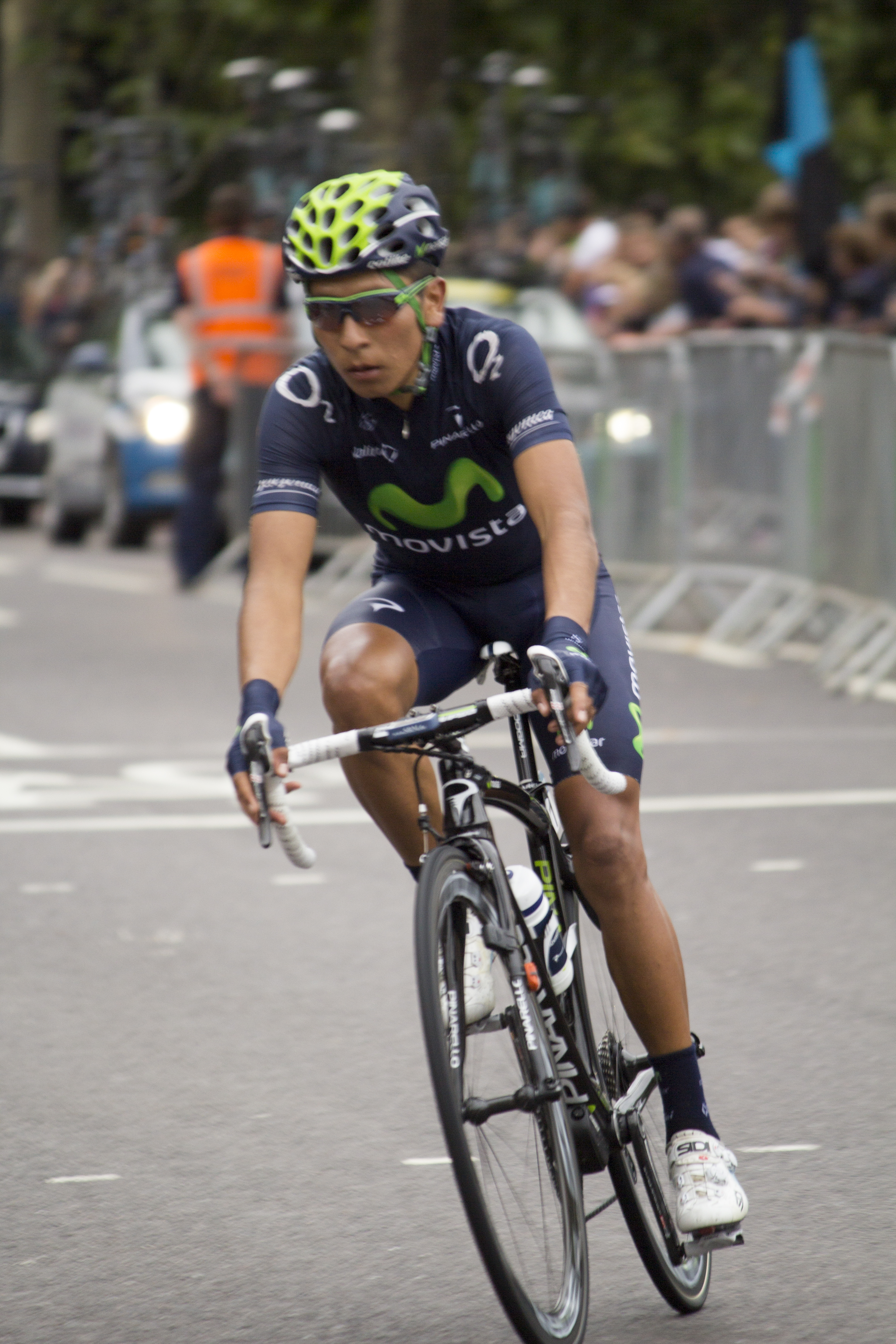
Nairo Quintana (photographed in 2013), winner of stage 5

The day's main breakaway was formed early on by Maxime Monfort (Lotto–Soudal), Michele Scarponi, Andriy Hrivko (both Astana), Alessandro De Marchi (BMC Racing Team), Matteo Montaguti (AG2R La Mondiale), Paul Voß (Bora–Argon 18), Ángel Vicioso (Team Katusha) and Jesús Herrada (Movistar Team). They built up a lead of over seven minutes after 60 kilometres (37 miles) of racing. Montaguti won both mountain sprints early in the stage, with Scarponi second on both occasions. After the two climbs, the main peloton made an effort to reduce the breakaway's lead and the gap was reduced to two minutes at the base of the final climb of the day. The breakaway disintegrated on the final climb, with Scarponi, De Marchi and Monfort forming a lead group. In the peloton, Vasil Kiryienka (Team Sky) and Ivan Basso (Tinkoff–Saxo) were setting the pace. Scarponi pulled clear of De Marchi and Monfort to lead the race solo, as Roman Kreuziger and Alberto Contador (Tinkoff–Saxo) briefly pulled clear of the main pack. As the riders entered the final 5 kilometres (3.1 miles), snow began to fall. As Contador drifted back in the pack, Nairo Quintana (Movistar Team) attacked and immediately broke clear of the pack. Contador tried to respond but was unable to take Quintana's wheel. Contador ended up in a group of about 15 riders chasing Quintana. Vincenzo Nibali (Astana) was dropped at this point, while Quintana quickly caught up to Scarponi.

Contador twice made attacks on the chasing group, but on both occasions was unable to break free, although the race leader, Wout Poels (Team Sky) was dropped, while Rigoberto Urán (Etixx–Quick-Step) also made an unsuccessful attack. Finally, Bauke Mollema (Trek Factory Racing) put in a successful attack and dropped the group behind. Contador did most of the work in a group of five riders, including Urán, Joaquim Rodríguez (Team Katusha), Thibaut Pinot (FDJ) and Adam Yates (Orica–GreenEDGE). The group did not keep up a steady pace, however, and Quintana was able to reach the finish line with a lead of 41 seconds over Mollema and 55 seconds over Contador's group. Quintana therefore moved into the lead of the overall classification, 39 seconds ahead of Mollema and over a minute ahead of Contador. Poels, meanwhile, finished 16th on the stage, 1' 37" behind Quintana, and dropped to tenth in the general classification.

After the stage, several riders expressed displeasure with the extreme weather conditions. Fabian Cancellara (Trek Factory Racing) was prominent among them, as he had been in a dispute over hot weather at the Tour of Oman, with Filippo Pozzato (Lampre–Merida) and Luca Paolini (Team Katusha) expressing similar concerns. The conditions were particularly difficult for the riders in the gruppetto, as the conditions they faced in the final kilometres were significantly worse than those faced by the race leaders. Cancellara and other riders called for an extreme-weather policy to govern racing in such conditions.

Stage 5 result
Rank	Rider	Team	Time
1	Nairo Quintana (COL)	Movistar Team	5h 26' 03"
2	Bauke Mollema (NED)	Trek Factory Racing	+ 41"
3	Joaquim Rodríguez (ESP)	Team Katusha	+ 55"
4	Rigoberto Urán (COL)	Etixx–Quick-Step	+ 55"
5	Alberto Contador (ESP)	Tinkoff–Saxo	+ 55"
6	Thibaut Pinot (FRA)	FDJ	+ 55"
7	Adam Yates (GBR)	Orica–GreenEDGE	+ 55"
8	Domenico Pozzovivo (ITA)	AG2R La Mondiale	+ 55"
9	Przemysław Niemiec (POL)	Lampre–Merida	+ 1' 05"
10	Damiano Caruso (ITA)	BMC Racing Team	+ 1' 10"

General Classification after Stage 5
Rank	Rider	Team	Time
1	Nairo Quintana (COL)	Movistar Team	19h 54' 45"
2	Bauke Mollema (NED)	Trek Factory Racing	+ 39"
3	Rigoberto Urán (COL)	Etixx–Quick-Step	+ 48"
4	Thibaut Pinot (FRA)	FDJ	+ 57"
5	Alberto Contador (ESP)	Tinkoff–Saxo	+ 1' 03"
6	Adam Yates (GBR)	Orica–GreenEDGE	+ 1' 04"
7	Domenico Pozzovivo (ITA)	AG2R La Mondiale	+ 1' 06"
8	Joaquim Rodríguez (ESP)	Team Katusha	+ 1' 07"
9	Steve Cummings (GBR)	MTN–Qhubeka	+ 1' 12"
10	Wout Poels (NED)	Team Sky	+ 1' 13"

=== Stage 6 ===
16 March 2015 – Rieti to Porto Sant'Elpidio, 210 km (130.5 mi)

The sixth stage was the final road stage of the race. It took the riders from the city of Rieti, at the foot of Monte Terminillo, northeast to finish on the Adriatic coast at Porto Sant'Elpidio over a 210-kilometre (130.5-mile) route. The first part was a 181.2-kilometre (112.6-mile) route, which took the riders from the startline and across some medium mountains. The most difficult climb was at Montelparo and came 78.8 kilometres (49.0 miles) from the finish line. Once the riders had reached Porto Sant'Elpidio, they entered a 14.4-kilometre (8.9-mile) finishing circuit. They first rode the final 8 kilometres (5.0 miles) of the circuit and crossed the finish line; this was the final intermediate sprint of the day. They then completed two complete laps of the circuit, where the final 1.6 kilometres (0.99 miles) were entirely straight. The stage took place in rainy conditions.

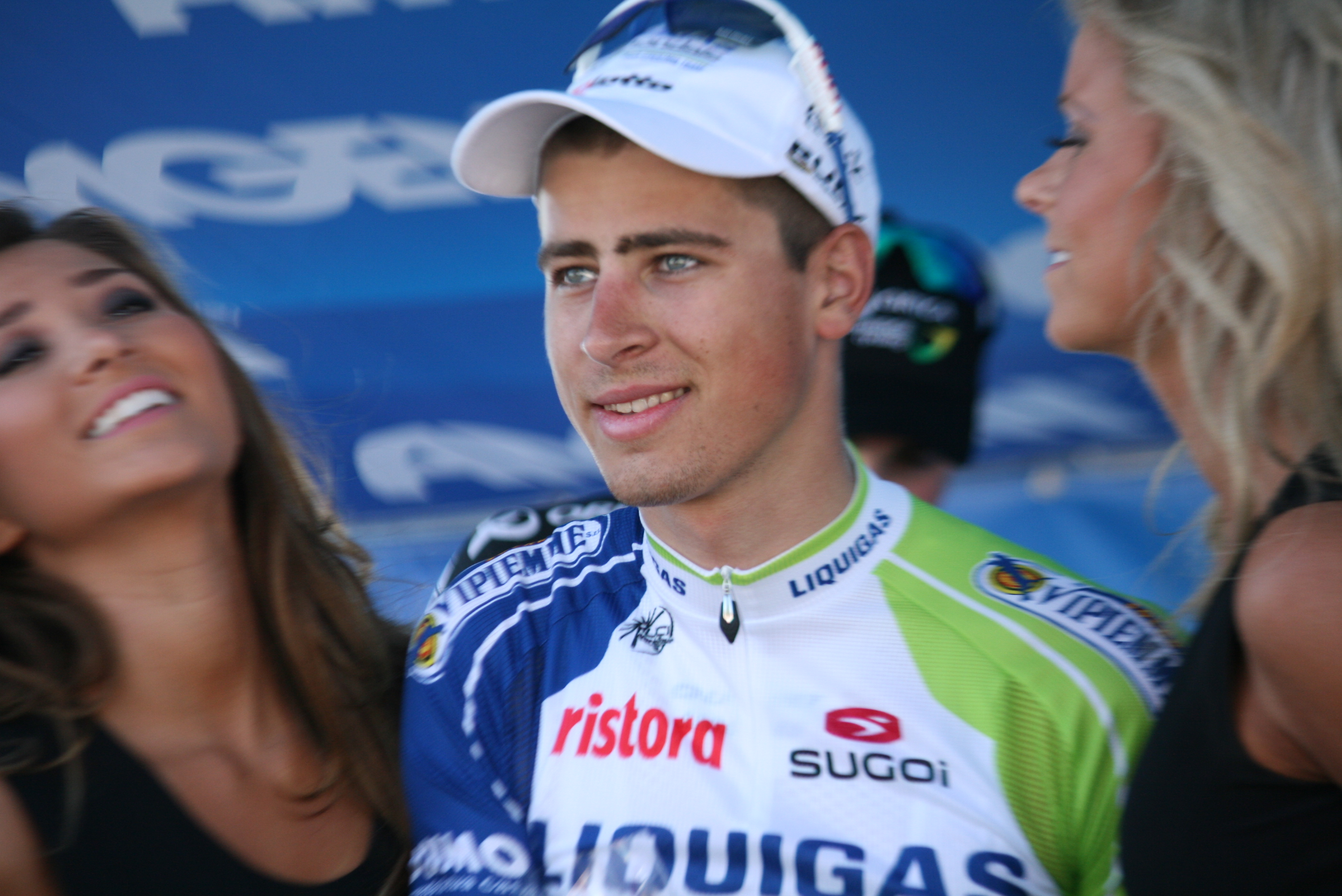
Peter Sagan (photographed in 2012), winner of stage 6

An early breakaway formed at 15 kilometres (9.3 miles), involving Yukiya Arashiro (Team Europcar), Stijn Devolder (Trek Factory Racing) and Alessandro Vanotti (Astana). They were caught, however, on the climb at Montelparo, as Tinkoff–Saxo increased the pace in the peloton. Their team leader, Alberto Contador, was one of the riders to set the pace on behalf of Peter Sagan. On this climb, several of the race's main sprinters were unable to stay with the peloton. These included Mark Cavendish (Etixx–Quick-Step) and Luka Mezgec (Team Giant–Alpecin). The breakaway's advantage had been reduced to 1' 30" and, soon after the summit of the climb, Devolder sat up and was caught. Arashiro and Vanotti were caught soon after, with 50 kilometres (31 miles) still to race.

Vanotti, however, attacked again and built a 40-second gap to the peloton, which was still led by Tinkoff–Saxo. He was joined in the lead by Alexis Vuillermoz (AG2R La Mondiale). The two riders rode together until there were 12 kilometres (7.5 miles) remaining, when Vuillermoz attacked. Tinkoff–Saxo were joined by Lotto–Soudal at the front of the pack and Vuillermoz was caught with 5 kilometres (3.1 miles) remaining. Throughout this time, the group containing the main sprinters in the race had been unable to reduce the advantage, which was 4 minutes with 30 kilometres (19 miles) to race. Cavendish, along with his entire sprint train, pulled out of the race as they crossed the finish line for the first time in order to rest ahead of Milan–San Remo the following weekend.

As the main peloton approached the finish line, it was led by MTN–Qhubeka, who still had several riders in the main pack. Tinkoff–Saxo had no riders left to support Sagan. He therefore positioned himself behind the final MTN–Qhubeka rider, Gerald Ciolek, who was being led out by Edvald Boasson Hagen. Sagan passed Ciolek in the final 150 metres (490 ft) win the stage. Ciolek finished second, with Jens Debusschere (Lotto–Soudal) in third. This was Sagan's first win in nine months, when he won a stage of the 2014 Tour de Suisse. All the general classification riders finished in the main group, so the standings were unchanged.

Stage 6 result
Rank	Rider	Team	Time
1	Peter Sagan (SVK)	Tinkoff–Saxo	5h 04' 13"
2	Gerald Ciolek (GER)	MTN–Qhubeka	+ 0"
3	Jens Debusschere (BEL)	Lotto–Soudal	+ 0"
4	Magnus Cort (DEN)	Orica–GreenEDGE	+ 0"
5	Maximiliano Richeze (ARG)	Lampre–Merida	+ 0"
6	Edvald Boasson Hagen (NOR)	MTN–Qhubeka	+ 0"
7	Nikias Arndt (GER)	Team Giant–Alpecin	+ 0"
8	Sam Bennett (IRL)	Bora–Argon 18	+ 0"
9	Ramūnas Navardauskas (LTU)	Cannondale–Garmin	+ 0"
10	Alexey Lutsenko (KAZ)	Astana	+ 0"

General classification after Stage 6
Rank	Rider	Team	Time
1	Nairo Quintana (COL)	Movistar Team	24h 58' 58"
2	Bauke Mollema (NED)	Trek Factory Racing	+ 39"
3	Rigoberto Urán (COL)	Etixx–Quick-Step	+ 48"
4	Thibaut Pinot (FRA)	FDJ	+ 57"
5	Alberto Contador (ESP)	Tinkoff–Saxo	+ 1' 03"
6	Adam Yates (GBR)	Orica–GreenEDGE	+ 1' 04"
7	Domenico Pozzovivo (ITA)	AG2R La Mondiale	+ 1' 06"
8	Joaquim Rodríguez (ESP)	Team Katusha	+ 1' 07"
9	Steve Cummings (GBR)	MTN–Qhubeka	+ 1' 12"
10	Wout Poels (NED)	Team Sky	+ 1' 13"

=== Stage 7 ===
17 March 2015 – San Benedetto del Tronto to San Benedetto del Tronto, 10 km (6.2 mi), individual time trial (ITT)

The seventh and final stage of the 2015 Tirreno–Adriatico was another individual time trial. This stage was 10 kilometres (6.2 miles) in length and took place entirely in the resort of San Benedetto del Tronto on the Adriatic seafront. The course was an out-and-back route; it first headed south, through an intermediate time check after 4.7 kilometres (2.9 miles), to a pair of 90-degree right hand turns halfway through the course. The course then headed north on almost entirely straight roads. The stage was flat throughout with no significant climbs.

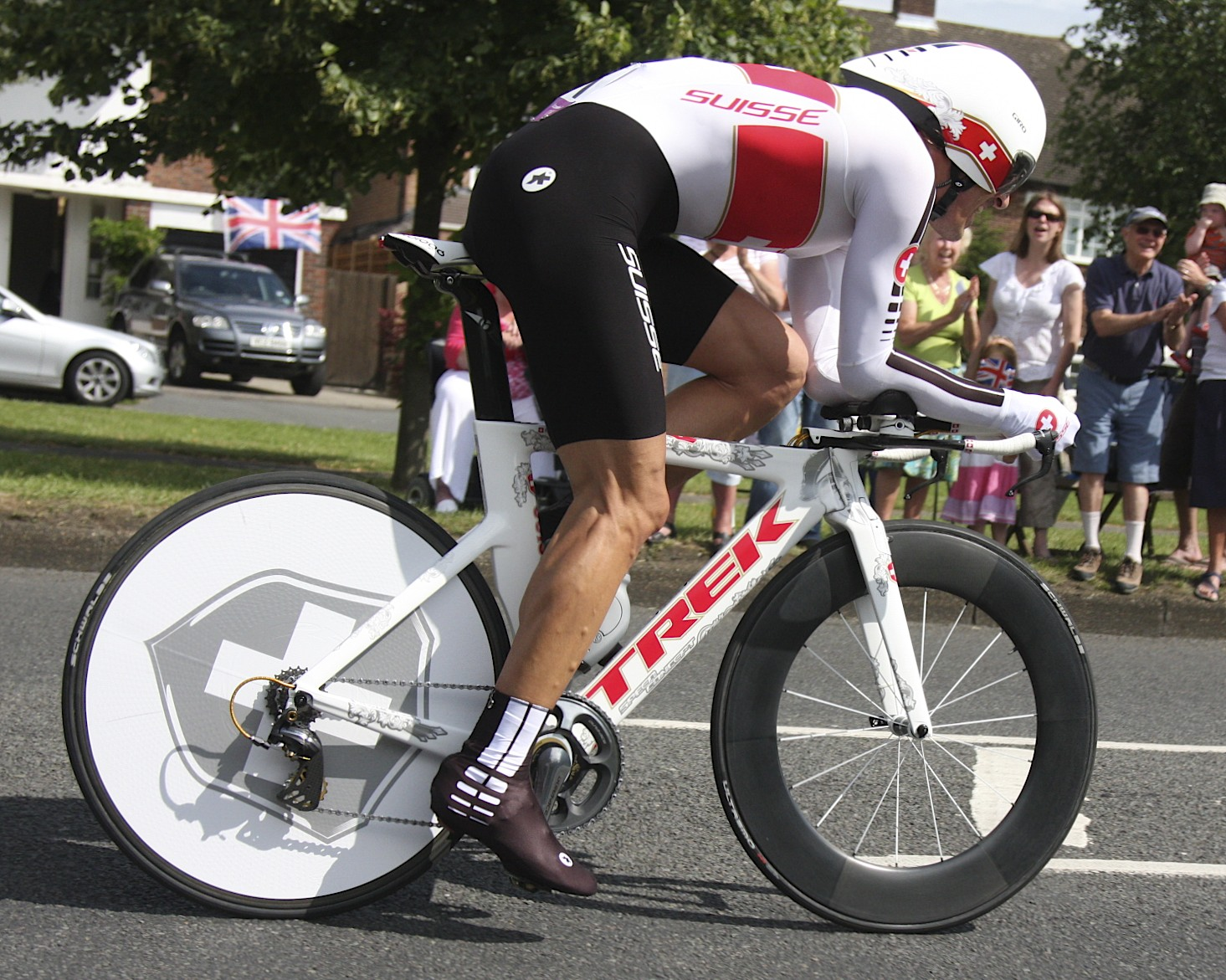
Fabian Cancellara (photographed in 2012), winner of stage 7

The early lead was taken by Maciej Bodnar (Tinkoff–Saxo), who set a time of 11' 39". His time was soon beaten, however, by Adriano Malori (Movistar Team), the winner of stage 1 and the Italian national time trial champion, with a time of 11' 27". Although Vasil Kiryienka (Team Sky) came close, he was five seconds behind at the finish. Fabian Cancellara (Trek Factory Racing), who had come second to Malori on stage 1, set off as Malori was finishing. Cancellara was a second off Malori's time at the intermediate checkpoint, but he was five seconds quicker over the second part of the course and took the stage lead by four seconds. Cancellara's time would not be beaten by any of the remaining riders and he won the stage, with Malori in second and Kiryienka in third.

Though the general classification riders did not have a chance of victory on the stage, there were still positions to be won and lost. The best time from the general classification riders was that of Alberto Contador (Tinkoff–Saxo), 31 seconds behind Cancellara, and he stayed in fifth place overall. Wout Poels (Team Sky), Steve Cummings (MTN–Qhubeka) and Thibaut Pinot (FDJ) all put in good times, with Poels and Cummings moving up in the top ten and Pinot defending his fourth place ahead of Contador. Bauke Mollema (Trek Factory Racing) also put in a strong ride, finishing ahead of Rigoberto Urán (Etixx–Quick-Step), who was seen as the better time triallist of the two. Mollema therefore defended his second place overall. He was not, however, able to catch the race leader Nairo Quintana (Movistar Team). Quintana finished 55" behind Cancellara in 55th place; he took the overall race victory ahead of Mollema by 18". Peter Sagan (Tinkoff–Saxo), the leader of the points competition, only had to finish the stage within the time limit to win the classification. He came very close to failing: he was the slowest rider in the stage, finishing 2' 59" behind Cancellara. It was, however, just enough to prevent his exclusion and to allow him the classification victory.

Stage 7 result
Rank	Rider	Team	Time
1	Fabian Cancellara (SUI)	Trek Factory Racing	11' 23"
2	Adriano Malori (ITA)	Movistar Team	+ 4"
3	Vasil Kiryienka (BLR)	Team Sky	+ 9"
4	Jonathan Castroviejo (ESP)	Movistar Team	+ 12"
5	Maciej Bodnar (POL)	Tinkoff–Saxo	+ 16"
6	Michael Hepburn (AUS)	Orica–GreenEDGE	+ 16"
7	Ramūnas Navardauskas (LIT)	Cannondale–Garmin	+ 17"
8	Steve Cummings (GBR)	MTN–Qhubeka	+ 23"
9	Andrey Amador (CRC)	Movistar Team	+ 25"
10	Edvald Boasson Hagen (NOR)	MTN–Qhubeka	+ 26"

Final general classification
Rank	Rider	Team	Time
1	Nairo Quintana (COL)	Movistar Team	25h 11' 16"
2	Bauke Mollema (NED)	Trek Factory Racing	+ 18"
3	Rigoberto Urán (COL)	Etixx–Quick-Step	+ 31"
4	Thibaut Pinot (FRA)	FDJ	+ 35"
5	Alberto Contador (ESP)	Tinkoff–Saxo	+ 39"
6	Steve Cummings (GBR)	MTN–Qhubeka	+ 40"
7	Wout Poels (NED)	Team Sky	+ 56"
8	Domenico Pozzovivo (ITA)	AG2R La Mondiale	+ 59"
9	Adam Yates (GBR)	Orica–GreenEDGE	+ 1' 09"
10	Roman Kreuziger (CZE)	Tinkoff–Saxo	+ 1' 11"

== Classification leadership table ==
There were four main classifications in the 2015 Tirreno–Adriatico. The first and most important of these was the general classification. This was calculated by adding each cyclist's finishing times on each stage. Time bonuses were awarded to the first three finishers on road stages (stages 2–6): the stage winner won a ten-second bonus, with six and four seconds for the second and third riders respectively. Bonus seconds were also awarded to the first three riders at intermediate sprints (three seconds for the winner of the sprint, two seconds for the rider in second and one second for the rider in third. The leader of the general classification received a blue jersey and the winner of the classification was considered the overall winner of the race.

The second classification was the points classification. On each stage of the race, points were awarded to the top 10 riders. The winner won 12 points, with 10 for the second-placed rider, 8 for the third-placed rider and then one point fewer for each place down to tenth place. Points were also awarded to the top four riders at intermediate sprints, with five points for the winner of the sprint and three, two and one points for the riders in second, third and fourth places, respectively. It was originally intended that points would not be awarded on stage 1 as it was a team time trial. After this was changed to an individual time trial, however, points were awarded on the stage, on the same scale as for an intermediate sprint. The winner of the points classification was awarded a red jersey.

The third classification was the mountains classification. On each of the road stages there were classified climbs on the route. The first riders to the top of the climb were awarded points in the mountains classification. For most of the climbs, the first four riders won points, with five, three, two and one points respectively. More points were awarded for the two most difficult climbs of the race. These were the summit finish to Monte Terminillo on stage 5 and the Poggio San Romualdo on stage 4. On these climbs, the winner won 15 points in the classification, with the next six riders also winning points. The rider with the most points was awarded the green jersey.

The final classification was the young riders classification. This was based on the general classification: the highest placed rider born after 1 January 1990 was the leader of the classification and was awarded a white jersey.

Classification leadership by stage
Stage	Winner	General classification	Points classification	Mountains classification	Young rider classification	Teams classification
1	Adriano Malori	Adriano Malori	Adriano Malori	not awarded	Peter Sagan	BMC Racing Team
2	Jens Debusschere	Adriano Malori	Jens Debusschere	Danilo Wyss	Peter Sagan	BMC Racing Team
3	Greg Van Avermaet	Greg Van Avermaet	Peter Sagan	Danilo Wyss	Peter Sagan	Movistar Team
4	Wout Poels	Wout Poels	Peter Sagan	Carlos Quintero	Thibaut Pinot	Team Sky
5	Nairo Quintana	Nairo Quintana	Peter Sagan	Carlos Quintero	Nairo Quintana	Team Katusha
6	Peter Sagan	Nairo Quintana	Peter Sagan	Carlos Quintero	Nairo Quintana	Team Katusha
7	Fabian Cancellara	Nairo Quintana	Peter Sagan	Carlos Quintero	Nairo Quintana	Movistar Team
Final		Nairo Quintana	Peter Sagan	Carlos Quintero	Nairo Quintana	Movistar Team

== Classification standings ==
=== General classification ===
Result of general classification
Rank	Rider	Team	Time
1	Nairo Quintana (COL)	Movistar Team	25h 11' 16"
2	Bauke Mollema (NED)	Trek Factory Racing	+ 18"
3	Rigoberto Urán (COL)	Etixx–Quick-Step	+ 31"
4	Thibaut Pinot (FRA)	FDJ	+ 35"
5	Alberto Contador (ESP)	Tinkoff–Saxo	+ 39"
6	Steve Cummings (GBR)	MTN–Qhubeka	+ 40"
7	Wout Poels (NED)	Team Sky	+ 56"
8	Domenico Pozzovivo (ITA)	AG2R La Mondiale	+ 59"
9	Adam Yates (GBR)	Orica–GreenEDGE	+ 1' 09"
10	Roman Kreuziger (CZE)	Tinkoff–Saxo	+ 1' 11"

=== Points classification ===
Result of points classification
Rank	Rider	Team	Points
1	Peter Sagan (SVK)	Tinkoff–Saxo	32
2	Fabian Cancellara (SUI)	Trek Factory Racing	21
3	Jens Debusschere (BEL)	Lotto–Soudal	20
4	Rigoberto Urán (COL)	Etixx–Quick-Step	19
5	Greg Van Avermaet (BEL)	BMC Racing Team	18
6	Joaquim Rodríguez (ESP)	Team Katusha	16
7	Nairo Quintana (COL)	Movistar Team	15
8	Adriano Malori (ITA)	Movistar Team	15
9	Wout Poels (NED)	Team Sky	14
10	Sam Bennett (IRL)	Bora–Argon 18	11

=== Mountains classification ===
Result of mountains classification
Rank	Rider	Team	Points
1	Carlos Quintero (COL)	Colombia	21
2	Danilo Wyss (SUI)	BMC Racing Team	18
3	Nairo Quintana (COL)	Movistar Team	15
4	Mathew Hayman (AUS)	Orica–GreenEDGE	15
5	Matteo Montaguti (ITA)	AG2R La Mondiale	13
6	Bauke Mollema (NED)	Trek Factory Racing	10
7	Luke Durbridge (AUS)	Orica–GreenEDGE	10
8	Michele Scarponi (ITA)	Astana	9
9	Joaquim Rodríguez (ESP)	Team Katusha	7
10	Wout Poels (NED)	Team Sky	5

=== Young rider classification ===
Result of young rider classification
Rank	Rider	Team	Time
1	Nairo Quintana (COL)	Movistar Team	25h 11' 16"
2	Thibaut Pinot (FRA)	FDJ	+ 35"
3	Adam Yates (GBR)	Orica–GreenEDGE	+ 1' 09"
4	Davide Formolo (ITA)	Cannondale–Garmin	+ 6' 39"
5	Louis Meintjes (RSA)	MTN–Qhubeka	+ 15' 26"
6	Jesús Herrada (ESP)	Movistar Team	+ 18' 36"
7	Peter Sagan (SVK)	Tinkoff–Saxo	+ 22' 45"
8	Tsgabu Grmay (ERI)	Lampre–Merida	+ 23' 01"
9	Brayan Ramírez (COL)	Colombia	+ 26' 01"
10	Moreno Moser (ITA)	Cannondale–Garmin	+ 27' 51"

=== Team classification ===
Result of teams classification
Rank	Team	Time
1	Movistar Team	75h 37' 35"
2	Team Sky	+ 29"
3	Team Katusha	+ 1' 02"
4	Tinkoff–Saxo	+ 6' 04"
5	AG2R La Mondiale	+ 7' 56"
6	MTN–Qhubeka	+ 10' 42"
7	Astana	+ 14' 28"
8	BMC Racing Team	+ 17' 50"
9	Lotto–Soudal	+ 18' 30"
10	FDJ	+ 20' 47"
