= San Biagio, Castelraimondo =

Church building in Castelraimondo, Italy

Coordinates: 43.2106933°N 13.0590849°E

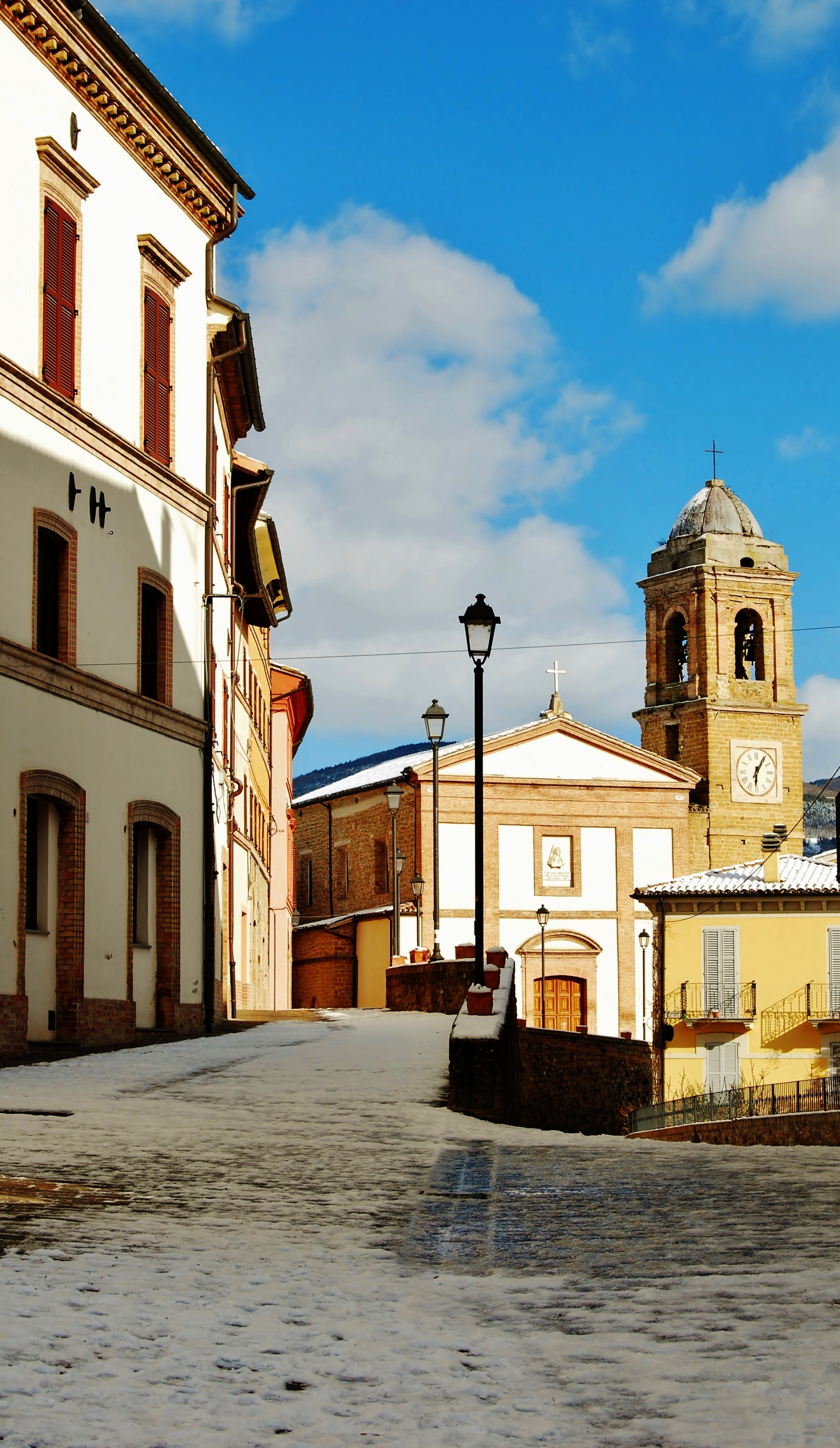

San Biagio is a Roman Catholic church located in Castelraimondo, province of Macerata, in the region of Marche, Italy.

Details on the foundation of the church are slim. It was likely erected at the site of a former church inside the castle walls. The church utilizes the castle guard tower as one of its bell-towers. The church is mentioned in documents by 1330. The earthquake of 1799 caused damage, and the church underwent a major reconstruction commissioned in 1802 by Cardinal Giuseppe Doria Pamphili, and with recommendations by the architect Giacomo Cansoni. A fire in 1906, led to further reconstruction and modifications.

The façade is in brick and stucco, while the flanks are in stone.
