= Wout Poels =

Dutch racing cyclist

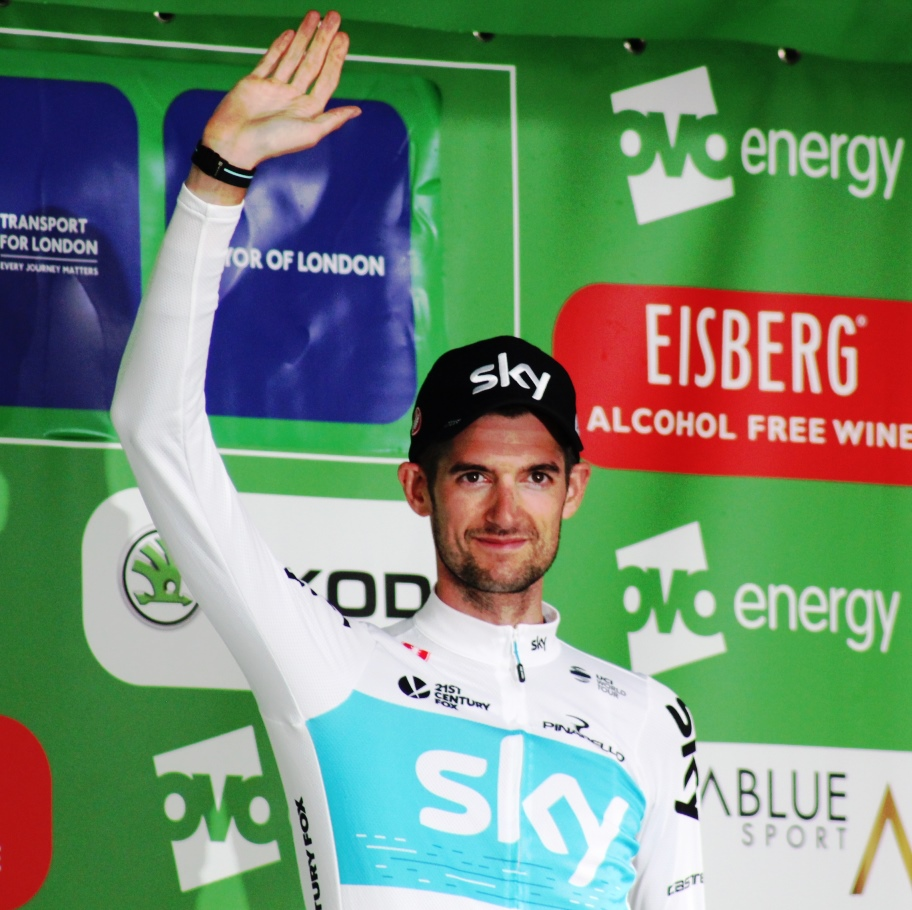
- Poels at the 2018 Tour of Britain

Personal information
- Full name: Wouter Lambertus Martinus Henricus Poels
- Born: 1 October 1987 (age 39) Venray, Limburg, the Netherlands
- Height: 1.83 m (6 ft 0 in)
- Weight: 66 kg (146 lb; 10 st 6 lb)

Cycling career
- Sport: Cycling
- Current team: Unibet Rose Rockets
- Discipline: Road
- Role: Rider
- Rider type: Climber; Super-domestique

Professional teams
- 2006–2008: Fondas-P3Transfer Team
- 2009–2013: Vacansoleil
- 2014: Omega Pharma–Quick-Step
- 2015–2019: Team Sky
- 2020–2024: Bahrain–McLaren
- 2025: XDS Astana Team
- 2026–: Unibet Rose Rockets

Major wins
- Grand Tours Tour de France 1 individual stage (2023) Vuelta a España 2 individual stages (2011, 2023) Stage races Vuelta a Andalucía (2022) Tour of Turkey (2025) One-day races and Classics Liège–Bastogne–Liège (2016)

Wouter Lambertus Martinus Henricus Poels (born 1 October 1987) is a Dutch professional road bicycle racer, who rides for UCI ProTeam Unibet Rose Rockets.

== Career ==
Poels was born in Venray. He almost lost a kidney after a massive crash on the sixth stage of the 2012 Tour de France.

After competing with the Vacansoleil–DCM squad since 2009, Poels moved to the Omega Pharma–Quick-Step squad for the 2014 season.

=== Team Sky (2015–19) ===
In September 2014, Team Sky announced that Poels would join them from 1 January 2015. His first win for the team came in the 2015 Tirreno–Adriatico, where he led the team following the withdrawal of Chris Froome. Poels won stage 4 into Castelraimondo with an attack on the final climb and a solo descent to the finish line. He moved into the lead of the race and went on to finish seventh in the overall standings. He later finished second overall at the Tour of Britain, winning the toughest mountain stage with an uphill finish on Hartside Fell.

In 2016, Poels won his first one-day race after sprinting to victory from a four-man group in Liège–Bastogne–Liège. It was the first monument for Team Sky and for Poels himself.

=== Bahrain–McLaren (2020–2024) ===
In September 2019, Poels announced that he was joining the Bahrain–Merida team, later renamed as Bahrain–McLaren, for the 2020 season. In his first season with the team, Poels finished sixth overall at the Vuelta a España. The following year, he held the polka-dot jersey for four days at the 2021 Tour de France, and recorded his best finish at the race to that point – sixteenth overall. In 2022, Poels won the penultimate stage and the general classification at the Vuelta a Andalucía, his first overall stage race win since 2016. Poels then won his first Tour de France stage in 2023; having been part of a large breakaway on stage fifteen, Poels and three other riders went clear following the Col des Aravis, with Poels soloing away on the final climb towards Saint-Gervais-les-Bains and he ultimately won the stage by more than two minutes.

=== XDS Astana (2025) ===
Poels joined XDS Astana Team for the 2025 season. His standout result for the season was winning Presidential Tour of Turkey general classification, mountain jersey and victory in stage 4.

=== Unibet Rose Rockets (2026-current) ===
After only a season with Astana, Poels leave the team and joined Unibet Rose Rockets at the start of 2026 season.

== Major results ==
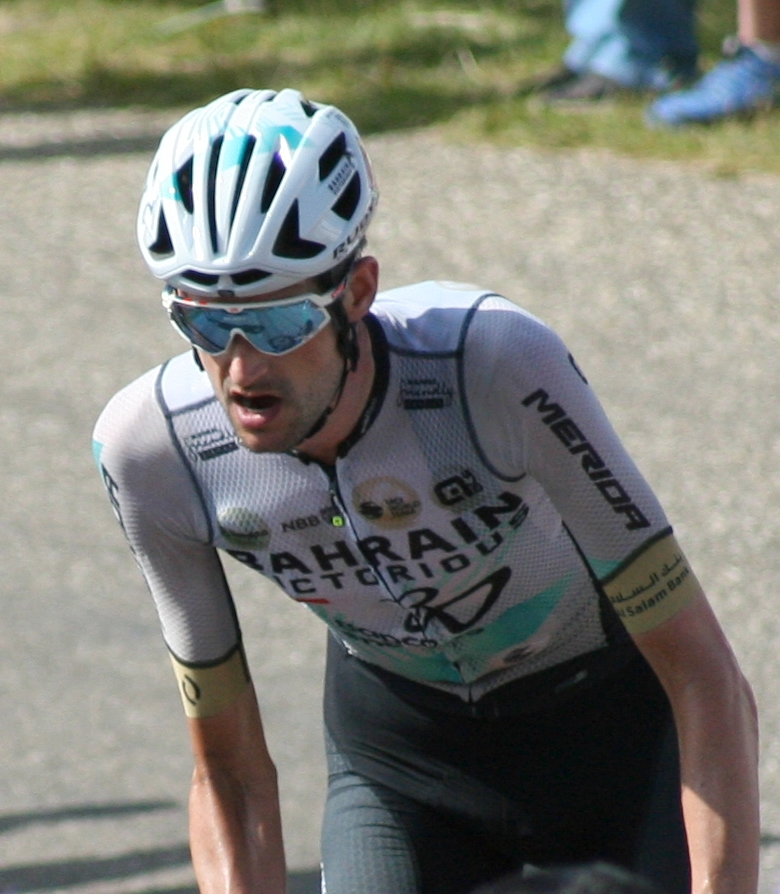
Poels at the 2023 Tour de France, where he won stage 15 of the race

2007
10th Overall Vuelta a Extremadura

1st Mountains classification

2008
1st Overall Vuelta Ciclista a León
3rd Overall Volta a Lleida
3rd Rund um Düren
9th Overall Circuit des Ardennes
2010 (2 pro wins)
1st Stage 4 Tour of Britain
2nd Overall Tour de l'Ain

1st Stage 4

8th Overall Tour du Poitou-Charentes
9th Eschborn–Frankfurt City Loop
2011 (1)
1st Stage 15 Vuelta a España
2nd Overall Tour de l'Ain

1st Stage 3

3rd Overall Tour Méditerranéen

1st Young rider classification

3rd Overall Vuelta a Murcia
4th Overall Tour de Pologne
2012 (1)
2nd Overall Tour de Luxembourg

1st Young rider classification
1st Stage 3

3rd Overall Vuelta a Murcia
8th Overall Tirreno–Adriatico

1st Young rider classification

2013 (1)
7th Amstel Curaçao Race
8th Overall Tour de l'Ain

1st Stage 4

9th Overall Tour of the Basque Country
10th Overall Tirreno–Adriatico
2014 (1)
1st Stage 1 (TTT) Tirreno–Adriatico
9th Strade Bianche
10th Overall Tour of the Basque Country

1st Stage 4

2015 (2)
2nd Overall Tour of Britain

1st Stage 5

3rd Overall Abu Dhabi Tour
5th Milano–Torino
7th Overall Tirreno–Adriatico

1st Stage 4

8th Overall Tour du Poitou-Charentes
8th GP Ouest-France
2016 (6)
1st Overall Volta a la Comunitat Valenciana

1st Points classification
1st Mountains classification
1st Stages 1 (ITT) & 4

1st Liège–Bastogne–Liège
1st Stage 5 Volta a Catalunya
1st Stage 6 Tour of Britain
4th La Flèche Wallonne
7th Overall Vuelta a Andalucía
2017 (1)
3rd Overall Tour de Pologne

1st Stage 7

4th Overall Volta a la Comunitat Valenciana
4th Overall Vuelta a Andalucía
6th Overall Vuelta a España
6th Milano–Torino
7th Overall Tour of Guangxi
2018 (3)
1st Stage 4 (ITT) Paris–Nice
2nd Overall Vuelta a Andalucía

1st Points classification
1st Stage 2

2nd Overall Tour of Britain

1st Stage 6

2019 (1)
3rd Overall Tour Down Under
3rd Overall Volta ao Algarve
4th Overall Critérium du Dauphiné

1st Stage 7

7th Overall Tirreno–Adriatico
10th Liège–Bastogne–Liège
2020
6th Overall Vuelta a España
6th Overall Volta a la Comunitat Valenciana
Combativity award Stage 5 Tour de France
2021
4th Overall Tour de la Provence
Tour de France

Held after Stages 8 & 15–17
Combativity award Stage 8

2022 (2)
1st Overall Vuelta a Andalucía

1st Stage 4

2023 (2)
1st Stage 15 Tour de France
1st Stage 20 Vuelta a España
6th Overall UAE Tour
9th Overall Tour of Slovenia
2024 (1)
3rd Overall Tour de Hongrie

1st Stage 5

6th Overall Tour of the Alps
2025 (2)
1st Overall Tour of Turkey

1st Mountains classification
1st Stage 4

7th Overall Tour of Oman
2026
4th Overall Sibiu Cycling Tour
7th Overall Arctic Race of Norway

=== General classification results timeline ===
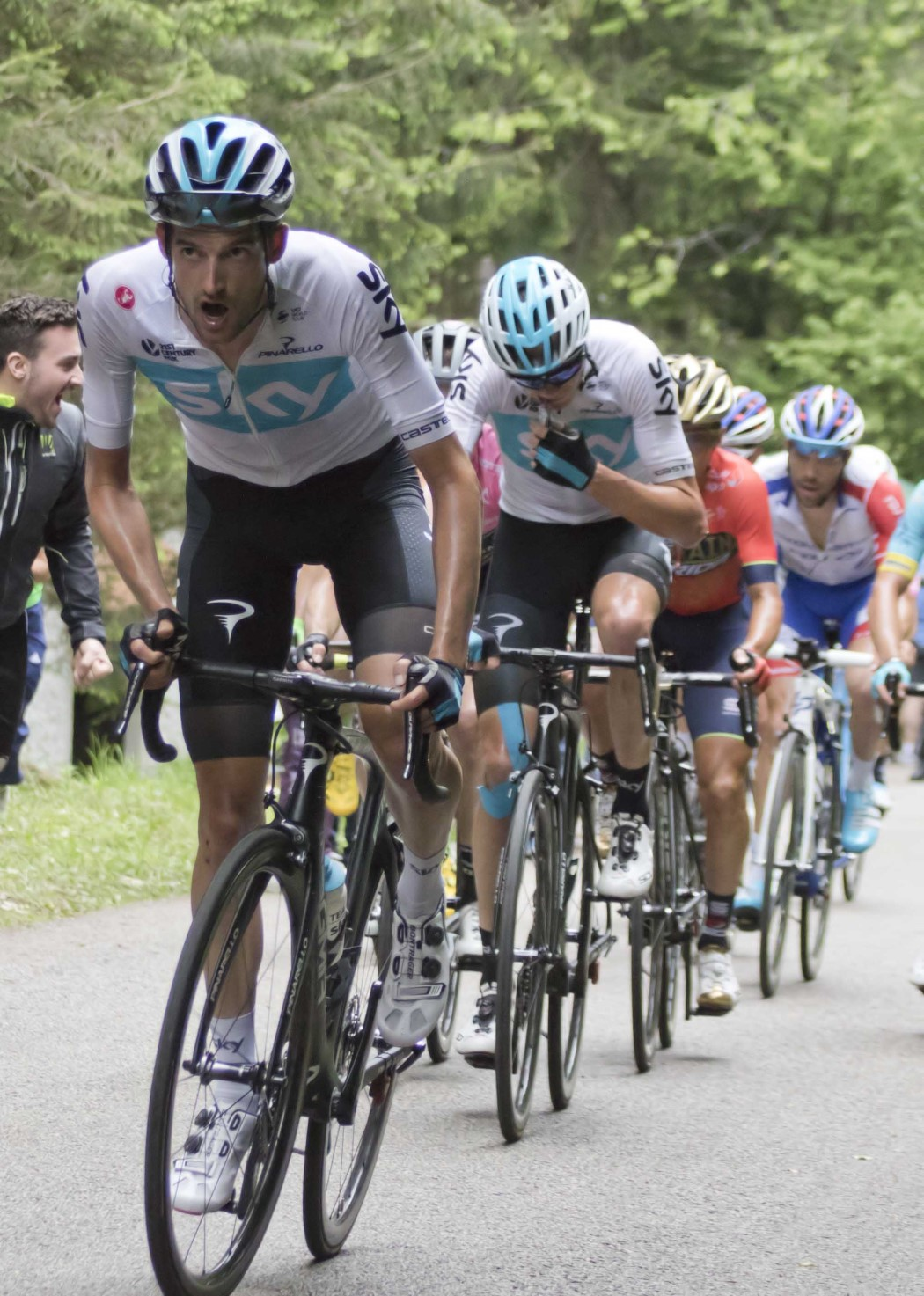
Poels leading a group of riders at the 2018 Giro d'Italia; he finished twelfth overall, his best finish at the race.

Grand Tour general classification results
Grand Tour	2011	2012	2013	2014	2015	2016	2017	2018	2019	2020	2021	2022	2023	2024	2025	2026
Giro d'Italia	—	—	—	21	—	—	—	12	—	—	—	34	—	—	50	22
Tour de France	DNF	DNF	28	—	44	28	—	58	26	110	16	—	27	43	—	—
Vuelta a España	17	—	DNF	38	—	—	6	—	34	6	23	DNF	15	—	23	
Major stage race general classification results
Stage races	2011	2012	2013	2014	2015	2016	2017	2018	2019	2020	2021	2022	2023	2024	2025	2026
Paris–Nice	—	—	—	—	—	—	—	DNF	—	—	—	15	27	—	—	—
Tirreno–Adriatico	18	8	10	38	7	14	—	—	7	—	—	—	—	11	DNF	—
Volta a Catalunya	—	—	—	—	24	34	—	—	—	NH	79	DNF	29	11	18	—
Tour of the Basque Country	39	17	9	10	—	—	—	—	—	NH	—	—	—	—	—	—
Tour de Romandie	—	—	DNF	—	—	—	—	—	—	NH	—	—	—	—	—	—
Critérium du Dauphiné	—	—	57	—	39	25	—	—	4	—	—	—	—	—	—	—
Tour de Suisse	25	15	—	—	—	—	—	—	—	NH	31	—	—	16	—	—

==== Classics results timeline ====
Monument	2009	2010	2011	2012	2013	2014	2015	2016	2017	2018	2019	2020	2021	2022	2023	2024	2025	2026
Milan–San Remo	—	—	—	—	—	—	—	—	—	—	—	—	—	—	—	—	—	119
Tour of Flanders	—	—	—	—	—	—	—	—	—	—	—	—	—	—	—	—	—	—
Paris–Roubaix	—	—	—	—	—	—	—	—	—	—	—	NH	—	—	—	—	—	—
Liège–Bastogne–Liège	—	—	DNF	76	—	80	—	1	—	117	10	87	109	38	42	30	—	—
Giro di Lombardia	119	—	DNF	—	—	DNF	12	DNF	38	—	—	—	—	DNF	—	105	—	
Classic	2009	2010	2011	2012	2013	2014	2015	2016	2017	2018	2019	2020	2021	2022	2023	2024	2025	2026
Omloop Het Nieuwsblad	—	—	—	—	—	—	—	—	—	—	—	—	—	—	—	—	—	—
Kuurne–Brussels–Kuurne	—	—	—	NH	—	—	—	—	—	—	—	—	—	—	—	—	—	—
Strade Bianche	—	—	—	—	—	9	—	—	—	—	—	—	—	—	—	—	—	44
E3 Harelbeke	—	—	—	—	—	—	—	—	—	—	—	NH	—	—	—	—	—	—
Dwars door Vlaanderen	—	—	—	—	—	—	—	—	—	—	—	NH	—	—	—	—	—	—
Amstel Gold Race	—	106	DNF	DNF	—	118	DNF	41	—	DNF	108	NH	58	—	22	—	—	—
La Flèche Wallonne	DNF	—	32	15	113	12	DNF	4	—	64	22	16	22	25	47	—	—	—
Clásica de San Sebastián	—	—	—	—	15	—	—	—	—	—	DNF	NH	—	DNF	—	—	—	

Legend
—	Did not compete
DNF	Did not finish
IP	In progress
NH	Not held
