= 2016 Volta a la Comunitat Valenciana =

UCI Europe Tour

Race details
- Dates: 3–7 February 2016
- Stages: 5
- Distance: 614.95 km (382.1 mi)
- Winning time: 14h 15' 51"

Results
Jersey awarded to the overall winner	Winner	Wout Poels (NED)	(Team Sky)
	Second	Luis León Sánchez (ESP)	(Astana)
	Third	Beñat Intxausti (ESP)	(Team Sky)
Jersey awarded to the points classification winner	Points	Wout Poels (NED)	(Team Sky)
Jersey awarded to the mountains classification winner	Mountains	Wout Poels (NED)	(Team Sky)
Jersey awarded to the team classification winner	Team	Team Sky	

The 2016 Volta a la Comunitat Valenciana was a road cycling stage race that took place in the Valencian Community between 3 and 7 February 2016. The race was rated as a 2.1 event as part of the 2016 UCI Europe Tour. It was the 67th edition of the Volta a la Comunitat Valenciana and the first since 2008; the race was revived by Ángel Casero and his brother Rafael.

The race included five stages. The first of these was a 16.25-kilometre (10.10 mi) individual time trial; this was then followed by four road stages, ending in Valencia. The previous champion, from the 2008 edition, was Rubén Plaza, but his Lampre–Merida team was not among those invited to start the race.

The first stage time trial was won by Wout Poels (Team Sky), with Luis León Sánchez (Astana) second and Poels's teammate Vasil Kiryienka, the world time trial champion third. Poels retained his lead by finishing third on the uphill finish the following day, with Dan Martin (Etixx–Quick-Step) winning the stage. He maintained this the following day, with Dylan Groenewegen (LottoNL–Jumbo winning a sprint. Poels extended his lead by winning Stage 4 alone, with his teammate Beñat Intxausti finishing second and moving up to third overall. The final stage was won in a solo break by Stijn Vandenbergh (Etixx–Quick-Step). Poels won the overall classification, with Sánchez second and Intxausti third. Poels also won the points and mountains classification, and Team Sky won the team classification.

== Teams ==
25 teams were invited to take part in the race. These included eight UCI WorldTeams, eight UCI Professional Continental teams, eight UCI Continental teams and a Spanish national team.

UCI WorldTeams

- Team Katusha
- Movistar Team
- Team Sky
- Etixx–Quick-Step
- Astana
- LottoNL–Jumbo
- IAM Cycling
- Cannondale

UCI Professional Continental teams

- Cofidis
- Roompot–Oranje Peloton
- Bardiani–CSF
- Caja Rural–Seguros RGA
- Wanty–Groupe Gobert
- Gazprom–RusVelo
- CCC–Sprandi–Polkowice
- Southeast–Venezuela

UCI Continental teams

- Burgos BH
- Team Roth
- Kinan Cycling Team
- GM Europa Ovini
- D'Amico–Bottecchia
- Tuşnad Cycling Team
- Euskadi Basque Country–Murias
- Lokosphinx

National teams

- Spain

== Stages ==
Stage schedule
Stage	Date	Route	Distance	Type	Winner
1	3 February	Benicàssim–Oropesa del Mar	16.25 km (10 mi)	Individual time trial	Wout Poels (NED)
2	4 February	Castellón de la Plana–Fredes	163.3 km (101 mi)	Hilly stage	Dan Martin (IRE)
3	5 February	Sagunto–Alzira	173.5 km (108 mi)	Hilly stage	Dylan Groenewegen (NED)
4	6 February	Orihuela–Xorret de Catí	141.3 km (88 mi)	Hilly stage	Wout Poels (NED)
5	7 February	Valencia–Valencia	120.6 km (75 mi)	Hilly stage	Stijn Vandenbergh (BEL)

=== Stage 1 ===
3 February 2016 – Benicàssim–Oropesa del Mar, 16.25 km (10 mi) (ITT)

Result of Stage 1 and general classification
Rank	Rider	Team	Time
1	Wout Poels (NED)	Team Sky	+ 22' 34"
2	Luis León Sánchez (ESP)	Astana	+ 15"
3	Vasil Kiryienka (BLR)	Team Sky	+ 21"
4	Diego Rosa (ITA)	Astana	+ 22"
5	Jesús Herrada (ESP)	Movistar Team	+ 26"
6	Victor Campenaerts (BEL)	LottoNL–Jumbo	+ 27"
7	Bob Jungels (LUX)	Etixx–Quick-Step	+ 27"
8	Leopold König (CZE)	Team Sky	+ 29"
9	Reto Hollenstein (SUI)	IAM Cycling	+ 30"
10	Imanol Erviti (ESP)	Movistar Team	+ 30"

=== Stage 2 ===
4 February Castellón de la Plana–Fredes, 163.3 km (101 mi)

Result of Stage 2
Rank	Rider	Team	Time
1	Dan Martin (IRL)	Etixx–Quick-Step	4h 10' 06"
2	Jesús Herrada (ESP)	Movistar Team	+ 2"
3	Wout Poels (NED)	Team Sky	+ 2"
4	Beñat Intxausti (ESP)	Team Sky	+ 2"
5	Tom-Jelte Slagter (NED)	Cannondale	+ 2"
6	Jon Izagirre (ESP)	Movistar Team	+ 2"
7	Luis León Sánchez (ESP)	Astana	+ 2"
8	Eduard Prades (ESP)	Caja Rural–Seguros RGA	+ 2"
9	Dayer Quintana (COL)	Movistar Team	+ 2"
10	Davide Formolo (ITA)	Cannondale	+ 2"

General classification after Stage 2
Rank	Rider	Team	Time
1	Wout Poels (NED)	Team Sky	4h 32' 42"
2	Luis León Sánchez (ESP)	Astana	+ 15"
3	Diego Rosa (ITA)	Astana	+ 22"
4	Jesús Herrada (ESP)	Movistar Team	+ 26"
5	Bob Jungels (LUX)	Etixx–Quick-Step	+ 27"
6	Javier Moreno (ESP)	Movistar Team	+ 32"
7	Beñat Intxausti (ESP)	Team Sky	+ 33"
8	Jon Izagirre (ESP)	Movistar Team	+ 38"
9	Leopold König (CZE)	Team Sky	+ 39"
10	Stef Clement (NED)	IAM Cycling	+ 45"

=== Stage 3 ===
5 February – Sagunto–Alzira, 173.5 km (108 mi)

Result of Stage 3
Rank	Rider	Team	Time
1	Dylan Groenewegen (NED)	LottoNL–Jumbo	4h 04' 12"
2	Nacer Bouhanni (FRA)	Cofidis	+ 0"
3	Alexander Porsev (RUS)	Team Katusha	+ 0"
4	Tom Boonen (BEL)	Etixx–Quick-Step	+ 0"
5	Raymond Kreder (NED)	Roompot–Oranje Peloton	+ 0"
6	Jonas van Genechten (BEL)	IAM Cycling	+ 0"
7	Pablo Torres (ESP)	Burgos BH	+ 0"
8	Nicola Ruffoni (ITA)	Bardiani–CSF	+ 0"
9	Filippo Fortin (ITA)	GM Europa Ovini	+ 0"
10	Giorgio Bocchiola (ITA)	D'Amico–Bottecchia	+ 0"

General classification after Stage 3
Rank	Rider	Team	Time
1	Wout Poels (NED)	Team Sky	8h 36' 54"
2	Luis León Sánchez (ESP)	Astana	+ 15"
3	Diego Rosa (ITA)	Astana	+ 22"
4	Jesús Herrada (ESP)	Movistar Team	+ 26"
5	Bob Jungels (LUX)	Etixx–Quick-Step	+ 27"
6	Javier Moreno (ESP)	Movistar Team	+ 32"
7	Beñat Intxausti (ESP)	Team Sky	+ 33"
8	Jon Izagirre (ESP)	Movistar Team	+ 38"
9	Leopold König (CZE)	Team Sky	+ 39"
10	Stef Clement (NED)	IAM Cycling	+ 45"

=== Stage 4 ===
6 February – Orihuela–Xorret de Catí, 141.3 km (88 mi)

Result of Stage 4
Rank	Rider	Team	Time
1	Wout Poels (NED)	Team Sky	3h 26' 32"
2	Beñat Intxausti (ESP)	Team Sky	+ 23"
3	Jon Izagirre (ESP)	Movistar Team	+ 23"
4	Fabio Aru (ITA)	Astana	+ 25"
5	Daniel Navarro (ESP)	Cofidis	+ 25"
6	Luis León Sánchez (ESP)	Astana	+ 31"
7	Davide Formolo (ITA)	Cannondale	+ 38"
8	Sergey Firsanov (RUS)	Gazprom–RusVelo	+ 38"
9	Tom-Jelte Slagter (NED)	Cannondale	+ 38"
10	Javier Moreno (ESP)	Movistar Team	+ 38"

General classification after Stage 4
Rank	Rider	Team	Time
1	Wout Poels (NED)	Team Sky	12h 03' 26"
2	Luis León Sánchez (ESP)	Astana	+ 46"
3	Beñat Intxausti (ESP)	Team Sky	+ 56"
4	Jon Izagirre (ESP)	Movistar Team	+ 1' 01"
5	Javier Moreno (ESP)	Movistar Team	+ 1' 10"
6	Fabio Aru (ITA)	Astana	+ 1' 26"
7	Diego Rosa (ITA)	Astana	+ 1' 27"
8	Jesús Herrada (ESP)	Movistar Team	+ 1' 31"
9	Daniel Navarro (ESP)	Cofidis	+ 1' 34"
10	Leopold König (CZE)	Team Sky	+ 1' 50"

=== Stage 5 ===
7 February – Valencia–Valencia, 120.6 km (75 mi)

Result of Stage 5
Rank	Rider	Team	Time
1	Stijn Vandenbergh (BEL)	Etixx–Quick-Step	2h 12' 25"
2	Dylan Groenewegen (NED)	LottoNL–Jumbo	+ 0"
3	Raymond Kreder (NED)	Roompot–Oranje Peloton	+ 0"
4	Nacer Bouhanni (FRA)	Cofidis	+ 0"
5	Jonas van Genechten (BEL)	IAM Cycling	+ 0"
6	Alexander Porsev (RUS)	Team Katusha	+ 0"
7	Sonny Colbrelli (ITA)	Bardiani–CSF	+ 0"
8	Matti Breschel (DEN)	Cannondale	+ 0"
9	Nicola Ruffoni (ITA)	Bardiani–CSF	+ 0"
10	Eduard Prades (ESP)	Caja Rural–Seguros RGA	+ 0"

General classification after Stage 5
Rank	Rider	Team	Time
1	Wout Poels (NED)	Team Sky	14h 15' 51"
2	Luis León Sánchez (ESP)	Astana	+ 46"
3	Beñat Intxausti (ESP)	Team Sky	+ 56"
4	Jon Izagirre (ESP)	Movistar Team	+ 1' 01"
5	Javier Moreno (ESP)	Movistar Team	+ 1' 10"
6	Fabio Aru (ITA)	Astana	+ 1' 26"
7	Diego Rosa (ITA)	Astana	+ 1' 27"
8	Jesús Herrada (ESP)	Movistar Team	+ 1' 31"
9	Daniel Navarro (ESP)	Cofidis	+ 1' 34"
10	Leopold König (CZE)	Team Sky	+ 1' 50"

== Classification Leadership ==
Classification leadership by stage
Stage	Winner	General classification	Points classification	Mountains classification	Team classification
1 (ITT)	Wout Poels	Wout Poels	Wout Poels	Wout Poels	Team Sky
2	Dan Martin	Wout Poels	Wout Poels	Dan Martin	Team Sky
3	Dylan Groenewegen	Wout Poels	Wout Poels	Dan Martin	Team Sky
4	Wout Poels	Wout Poels	Wout Poels	Wout Poels	Team Sky
5	Stijn Vandenbergh	Wout Poels	Wout Poels	Wout Poels	Team Sky
Final		Wout Poels	Wout Poels	Wout Poels	Team Sky
