= Xorret de Catí =

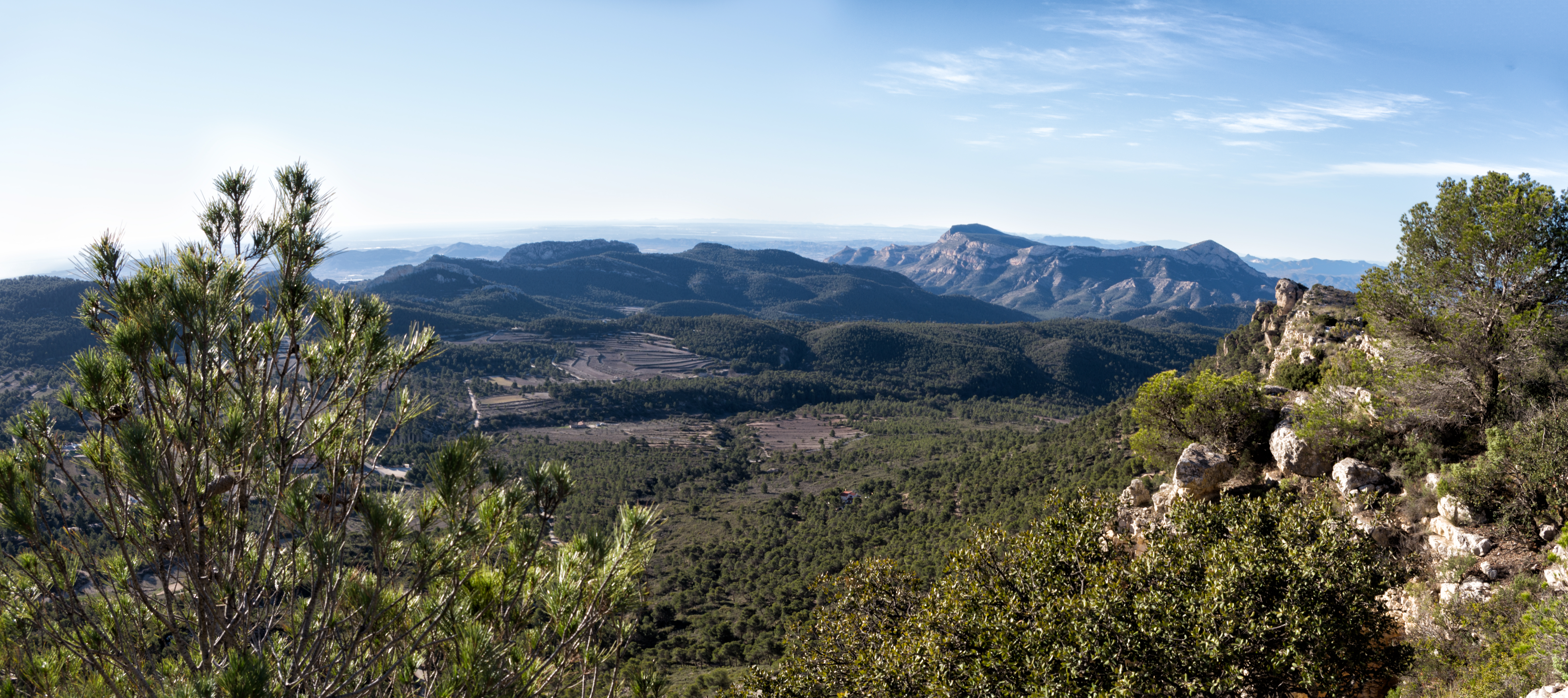

Highest point
- Elevation: 1,100 m (3,600 ft)
- Coordinates: 38°31′12″N 0°40′42″W

Geography
- Location within Spain
- Location: Alacantí, Valencian Community; Alicante
- Parent range: Prebaetic System, Eastern zone

Geology
- Mountain type: karstic

Climbing
- First ascent: Unknown
- Easiest route: From Castalla

Xorret de Catí is a rural mountainous area in the Valencian Community, Spain. As a part of Prebaetic System, it is located in the province of Alicante, between Castalla and Petrer, at an altitude of about 1,100 metres. Xorret de Catí is open throughout the year.

Xorret means "little stream" in Valencian, taking its name from a small spring in the area. The area is situated in the Sierra del Fraile, with a maximum height of 1,261 m (4,137 ft), sometimes also known as Sierra de Catí, a little to the north of Sierra del Cid and to the west of Sierra del Maigmó.

It can be accessed from both Petrer and Castalla. The vegetation is typical Mediterranean, with a predominance of pine forests and evergreen oaks, as well as shrubs like thyme, lavender, wild olive, sage, and broom.

== Cycling ==
Xorret de Catí is one of the most famous cycling climbs in the Valencia region. It is often present at the Volta a la Comunitat Valenciana. It has been popular with fans since its first appearance in the 1998 Vuelta a España - a stage won by climber Chava Jiménez. The climb beginning just south of Castalla is undoubtedly the star side of Xorret de Catí, with consistently steep gradients - at times in excess of 20% - testing even the strongest of climbers.

=== Monument to the cyclist ===
At the top of the climb there is a "monument to the cyclist" (es: Monumento al Ciclista del Xorret del Catí). It is a bronze statue, on a marble plinth, representing of a racing cyclist climbing the hill. This iconic sculpture, was created by the Spanish sculptor Vicente Ferrero in the year 2003 as a tribute to the cyclists who were ascending Xorret de Catí as a result of the uphill finishes of La Vuelta in this challenging setting. The sculpture's weights 300 kilograms, measuring 175x55x178cm. On the plinth there is the list of winners of Vuelta a España stages on this hill, as well as winners of Vuelta a la Comunitat Valenciana Feminas stages.

In May 2023 the sculpture was stolen - not a simple task, considering its weight and size.

=== Appearances in Vuelta a España ===
Year	Stage winner	Race leader
1998	(Spain) José María Jiménez	(Spain) José María Jiménez
2000	(Spain) Eladio Jiménez	(Switzerland) Alex Zülle
2004	(Spain) Eladio Jiménez	(United States) Floyd Landis
2009	(Spain) Gustavo César Veloso	(Spain) Alejandro Valverde
2010	(France) David Moncoutié	(Spain) Igor Antón
2017	(France) Julian Alaphilippe	(United Kingdom) Chris Froome
2023	(Slovenia) Primož Roglič	(United States) Sepp Kuss

== See also ==
- Mountains of the Valencian Community
