= Castelraimondo =

- Comune
- Comune di Castelraimondo
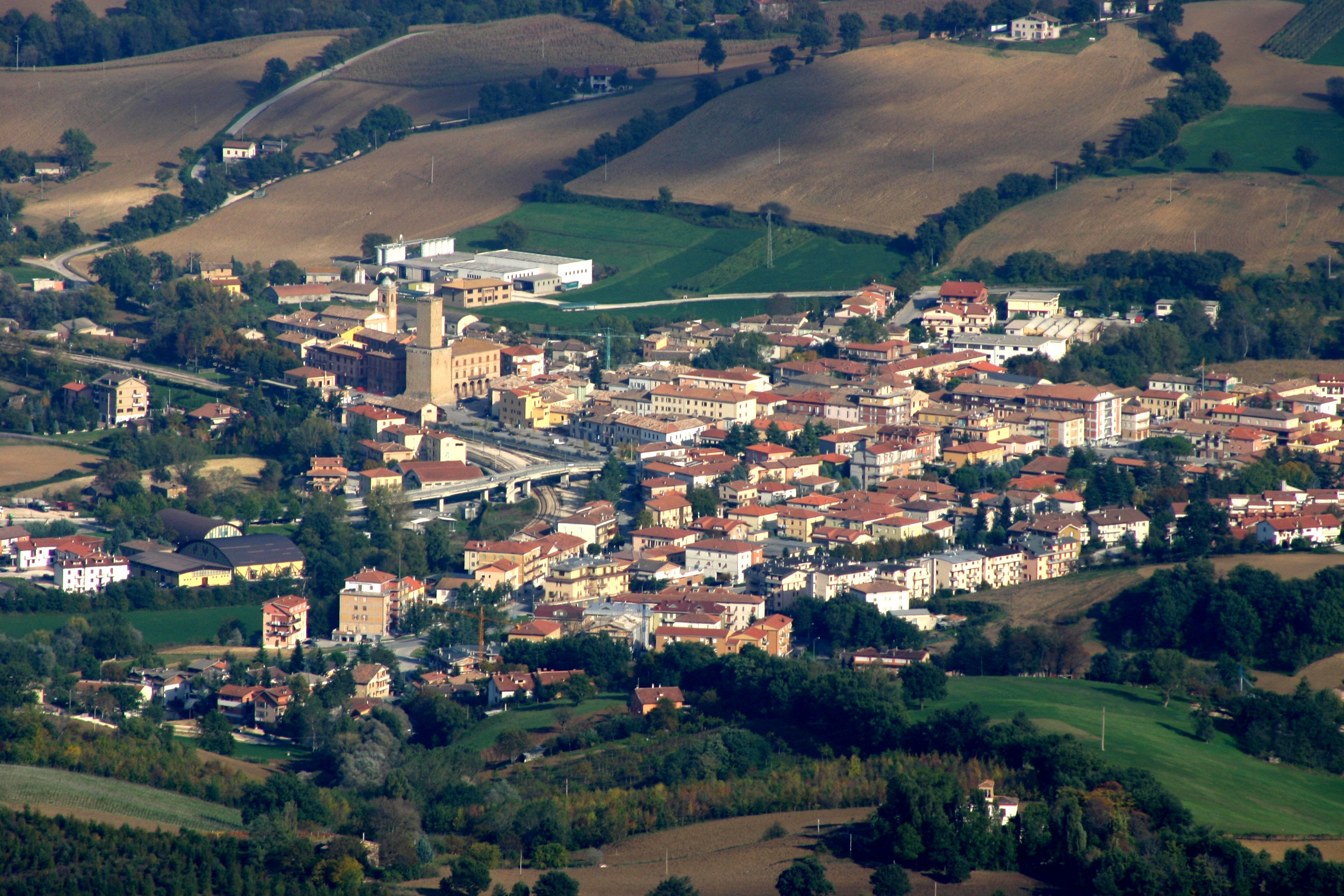
- Castelraimondo

- Coat of arms

- Location within Italy Location within Marche
- Coordinates: 43°13′N 13°3′E
- Country: Italy
- Region: Marche
- Province: Macerata (MC)
- Frazioni: Crispiero, Castel S.Maria, Rustano, Brondoleto, Collina, S.Angelo, Carsignano

Government
  - Mayor: Renzo Marinelli

Area
  - Total: 44.9 km^{2} (17.3 sq mi)
- Elevation: 305 m (1,001 ft)

Population (28 February 2017)
  - Total: 4,534
  - Density: 101/km^{2} (262/sq mi)
- Demonym: Castelraimondesi
- Time zone: UTC+1 (CET)
  - Summer (DST): UTC+2 (CEST)
- Postal code: 62022
- Dialing code: 0737
- Website: Official website

Castelraimondo is a comune (municipality) in the Province of Macerata in the Italian region Marche, located about 60 kilometres (37 mi) southwest of Ancona and about 35 kilometres (22 mi) southwest of Macerata.

Castelraimondo borders the following municipalities: Camerino, Fiuminata, Gagliole, Matelica, Pioraco, San Severino Marche, Serrapetrona. The main sights is the Cassero, a watchtower built by the Da Varano lords of Camerino in medieval times.

== Main sights ==
The town contains the following churches:

- San Biagio.
- San Lorenzo a Brondoleto.
- San Martino a Rustano.
- San Michele Arcangelo a Sant’Angelo.
- Santa Maria Assunta a Collina.
