= 2021 UCI Track Cycling World Championships – Men's omnium =

Track Cycling World Championship

Men's omnium at the 2021 UCI Track Cycling World Championships
- Venue: Vélodrome Couvert Régional Jean Stablinski
- Location: Roubaix, France
- Dates: 23 October
- Competitors: 27 from 27 nations
- Winning points: 180

Medalists
| gold medal | Ethan Hayter | Great Britain |
| silver medal | Aaron Gate | New Zealand |
| bronze medal | Elia Viviani | Italy |

The Men's omnium competition at the 2021 UCI Track Cycling World Championships was held on 23 October 2021.

== Qualifying ==
The first 12 riders in each heat advance.

=== Heat 1 ===
The race was started at 10:00.

| Rank | Name | Nation | Lap points | Sprint points | Total points | Notes |
|---|---|---|---|---|---|---|
| 1 | Ethan Hayter | Great Britain | 20 | 6 | 26 | Q |
| 2 | Iúri Leitão | Portugal | 20 | 5 | 25 | Q |
| 3 | Fabio Van den Bossche | Belgium | 20 | 3 | 23 | Q |
| 4 | Viktor Filutás | Hungary | 0 | 14 | 14 | Q |
| 5 | Kelland O'Brien | Australia | 0 | 13 | 13 | Q |
| 6 | Eiya Hashimoto | Japan | 0 | 10 | 10 | Q |
| 7 | Derek Gee | Canada | 0 | 10 | 10 | Q |
| 8 | Ricardo Peña | Mexico | 0 | 8 | 8 | Q |
| 9 | Juan Esteban Arango | Colombia | 0 | 8 | 8 | Q |
| 10 | Tim Teutenberg | Germany | 0 | 6 | 6 | Q |
| 11 | Roy Eefting | Netherlands | 0 | 6 | 6 | Q |
| 12 | Daniel Crista | Romania | 0 | 5 | 5 | Q |
| 13 | Yacine Chalel | Algeria | 0 | 3 | 3 | |
| 14 | Roman Gladysh | Ukraine | −20 | 2 | −18 | |

=== Heat 2 ===
The race was started at 10:23.

| Rank | Name | Nation | Lap points | Sprint points | Total points | Notes |
|---|---|---|---|---|---|---|
| 1 | Elia Viviani | Italy | 0 | 15 | 15 | Q |
| 2 | Erik Martorell | Spain | 0 | 14 | 14 | Q |
| 3 | Denis Rugovac | Czech Republic | 0 | 14 | 14 | Q |
| 4 | Yauheni Karaliok | Belarus | 0 | 12 | 12 | Q |
| 5 | Aaron Gate | New Zealand | 0 | 9 | 9 | Q |
| 6 | Alan Banaszek | Poland | 0 | 8 | 8 | Q |
| 7 | Gleb Syritsa | Russian Cycling Federation | 0 | 8 | 8 | Q |
| 8 | Donavan Grondin | France | 0 | 5 | 5 | Q |
| 9 | Akil Campbell | Trinidad and Tobago | 0 | 5 | 5 | Q |
| 10 | Gavin Hoover | United States | 0 | 4 | 4 | Q |
| 11 | Alex Vogel | Switzerland | 0 | 4 | 4 | Q |
| 12 | Matias Malmberg | Denmark | 0 | 1 | 1 | Q |
| – | Teck Kwang Calvin Sim | Singapore | −40 | Did not finish | | |

== Results ==
=== Scratch race ===
The scratch race was started at 12:24.

| Rank | Name | Nation | Laps down | Event points |
|---|---|---|---|---|
| 1 | Ethan Hayter | Great Britain | | 40 |
| 2 | Donavan Grondin | France | | 38 |
| 3 | Elia Viviani | Italy | | 36 |
| 4 | Iúri Leitão | Portugal | | 34 |
| 5 | Aaron Gate | New Zealand | | 32 |
| 6 | Matias Malmberg | Denmark | | 30 |
| 7 | Eiya Hashimoto | Japan | | 28 |
| 8 | Derek Gee | Canada | | 26 |
| 9 | Alex Vogel | Switzerland | | 24 |
| 10 | Erik Martorell | Spain | | 22 |
| 11 | Fabio Van den Bossche | Belgium | | 20 |
| 12 | Roy Eefting | Netherlands | | 18 |
| 13 | Yauheni Karaliok | Belarus | | 16 |
| 14 | Juan Esteban Arango | Colombia | | 14 |
| 15 | Denis Rugovac | Czech Republic | | 12 |
| 16 | Alan Banaszek | Poland | | 10 |
| 17 | Gavin Hoover | United States | | 8 |
| 18 | Kelland O'Brien | Australia | | 6 |
| 19 | Gleb Syritsa | Russian Cycling Federation | | 4 |
| 20 | Tim Teutenberg | Germany | | 2 |
| 21 | Viktor Filutás | Hungary | −1 | 1 |
| 22 | Daniel Crista | Romania | −1 | 1 |
| 23 | Ricardo Peña | Mexico | −1 | 1 |
| 24 | Akil Campbell | Trinidad and Tobago | −2 | 1 |

=== Tempo race ===
The tempo race was started at 12:24.

| Rank | Name | Nation | Lap points | Sprint points | Total points | Event points |
|---|---|---|---|---|---|---|
| 1 | Ethan Hayter | Great Britain | 20 | 8 | 28 | 40 |
| 2 | Iúri Leitão | Portugal | 20 | 4 | 24 | 38 |
| 3 | Aaron Gate | New Zealand | 20 | 1 | 21 | 36 |
| 4 | Erik Martorell | Spain | 0 | 4 | 4 | 34 |
| 5 | Kelland O'Brien | Australia | 0 | 3 | 3 | 32 |
| 6 | Derek Gee | Canada | 0 | 2 | 2 | 30 |
| 7 | Matias Malmberg | Denmark | 0 | 1 | 1 | 28 |
| 8 | Elia Viviani | Italy | 0 | 0 | 0 | 26 |
| 9 | Yauheni Karaliok | Belarus | 0 | 0 | 0 | 24 |
| 10 | Alan Banaszek | Poland | 0 | 0 | 0 | 22 |
| 11 | Fabio Van den Bossche | Belgium | 0 | 0 | 0 | 20 |
| 12 | Eiya Hashimoto | Japan | 0 | 0 | 0 | 18 |
| 13 | Viktor Filutás | Hungary | −20 | 10 | −10 | 16 |
| 14 | Donavan Grondin | France | −20 | 2 | −18 | 14 |
| 15 | Alex Vogel | Switzerland | −20 | 1 | −19 | 12 |
| 16 | Ricardo Peña | Mexico | −20 | 0 | −20 | 10 |
| 17 | Denis Rugovac | Czech Republic | −20 | 0 | −20 | 8 |
| 18 | Juan Esteban Arango | Colombia | −20 | 0 | −20 | 6 |
| 19 | Akil Campbell | Trinidad and Tobago | −20 | 0 | −20 | 4 |
| 20 | Gavin Hoover | United States | −20 | 0 | −20 | 2 |
| 21 | Roy Eefting | Netherlands | −20 | 0 | −20 | 1 |
| – | Tim Teutenberg | Germany | Did not start | | | |
| – | Daniel Crista | Romania | Did not start | | | |
| – | Gleb Syritsa | Russian Cycling Federation | Did not start | | | |

=== Elimination race ===
The elimination race was started at 18:51.

| Rank | Name | Nation | Event points |
|---|---|---|---|
| 1 | Aaron Gate | New Zealand | 40 |
| 2 | Donavan Grondin | France | 38 |
| 3 | Matias Malmberg | Denmark | 36 |
| 4 | Ethan Hayter | Great Britain | 34 |
| 5 | Eiya Hashimoto | Japan | 32 |
| 6 | Erik Martorell | Spain | 30 |
| 7 | Gavin Hoover | United States | 28 |
| 8 | Iúri Leitão | Portugal | 26 |
| 9 | Elia Viviani | Italy | 24 |
| 10 | Akil Campbell | Trinidad and Tobago | 22 |
| 11 | Yauheni Karaliok | Belarus | 20 |
| 12 | Alex Vogel | Switzerland | 18 |
| 13 | Alan Banaszek | Poland | 16 |
| 14 | Roy Eefting | Netherlands | 14 |
| 15 | Kelland O'Brien | Australia | 12 |
| 16 | Derek Gee | Canada | 10 |
| 17 | Fabio Van den Bossche | Belgium | 8 |
| 18 | Denis Rugovac | Czech Republic | 6 |
| 19 | Ricardo Peña | Mexico | 4 |
| 20 | Juan Esteban Arango | Colombia | 2 |
| 21 | Viktor Filutás | Hungary | 1 |

=== Points race and overall standings ===
The points race was started at 20:02.

| Rank | Name | Nation | Lap points | Sprint points | Total points |
|---|---|---|---|---|---|
| 1st place, gold medalist(s) | Ethan Hayter | Great Britain | 40 | 26 | 180 |
| 2nd place, silver medalist(s) | Aaron Gate | New Zealand | 0 | 16 | 124 |
| 3rd place, bronze medalist(s) | Elia Viviani | Italy | 20 | 15 | 121 |
| 4 | Iúri Leitão | Portugal | 0 | 19 | 117 |
| 5 | Erik Martorell | Spain | 20 | 6 | 112 |
| 6 | Matias Malmberg | Denmark | 0 | 8 | 102 |
| 7 | Donavan Grondin | France | 0 | 11 | 101 |
| 8 | Fabio Van den Bossche | Belgium | 20 | 10 | 78 |
| 9 | Eiya Hashimoto | Japan | 0 | 0 | 78 |
| 10 | Derek Gee | Canada | 0 | 2 | 68 |
| 11 | Alan Banaszek | Poland | 20 | 0 | 68 |
| 12 | Yauheni Karaliok | Belarus | 0 | 0 | 60 |
| 13 | Kelland O'Brien | Australia | 0 | 0 | 50 |
| 14 | Gavin Hoover | United States | 0 | 0 | 38 |
| 15 | Alex Vogel | Switzerland | –20 | 0 | 34 |
| 16 | Roy Eefting | Netherlands | 0 | 0 | 33 |
| 17 | Viktor Filutás | Hungary | 0 | 8 | 26 |
| 18 | Juan Esteban Arango | Colombia | 0 | 0 | 22 |
| 19 | Ricardo Peña | Mexico | –20 | 0 | –5 |
| – | Denis Rugovac | Czech Republic | Did not finish | | |
| – | Akil Campbell | Trinidad and Tobago | Did not finish | | |
| – | Tim Teutenberg | Germany | Did not finish | | |
| – | Gleb Syritsa | Russian Cycling Federation | Did not finish | | |
| – | Daniel Crista | Romania | Did not finish | | |
