= 2022 UCI Track Cycling World Championships – Men's omnium =

Men's omnium at the 2022 UCI Track Cycling World Championships
- Venue: Vélodrome National
- Location: Saint-Quentin-en-Yvelines, France
- Dates: 15 October
- Competitors: 24 from 24 nations
- Winning points: 147

Medalists
gold medal	Ethan Hayter	Great Britain
silver medal	Benjamin Thomas	France
bronze medal	Aaron Gate	New Zealand

The Men's omnium competition at the 2022 UCI Track Cycling World Championships was held on 15 October 2022.

== Results ==
=== Scratch race ===
The scratch race was started at 13:17.

Rank	Name	Nation	Laps down	Event points
1	Aaron Gate	New Zealand		40
2	Shunsuke Imamura	Japan		38
3	Kelland O'Brien	Australia		36
4	Ethan Hayter	Great Britain	−1	34
5	Elia Viviani	Italy	−1	32
6	Benjamin Thomas	France	−1	30
7	Dylan Bibic	Canada	−1	28
8	Vincent Hoppezak	Netherlands	−1	26
9	Simon Vitzthum	Switzerland	−1	24
10	Niklas Larsen	Denmark	−1	22
12	Tim Torn Teutenberg	Germany	−1	18
13	Alan Banaszek	Poland	−1	16
15	Gavin Hoover	United States	−1	12
17	Jules Hesters	Belgium	−1	8
23	Sebastián Mora	Spain	−1	1
11	Bernard Van Aert	Indonesia	−2	20
14	Ángel Pulgar	Venezuela	−2	14
16	Artyom Zakharov	Kazakhstan	−2	10
18	João Matias	Portugal	−2	6
19	Ricardo Peña	Mexico	−2	4
20	Juan Esteban Arango	Colombia	−2	2
21	Akil Campbell	Trinidad and Tobago	−2	1
22	Daniel Crista	Romania	−2	1
24	Yacine Chalel	Algeria	−3	1

=== Tempo race ===
The tempo race was started at 15:40.

Rank	Name	Nation	Lap points	Sprint points	Total points	Event points
1	Shunsuke Imamura	Japan	40	1	41	40
2	Ethan Hayter	Great Britain	20	9	29	38
3	Aaron Gate	New Zealand	20	4	24	36
4	Niklas Larsen	Denmark	20	3	23	34
5	Juan Esteban Arango	Colombia	20	3	23	32
6	Elia Viviani	Italy	20	2	22	30
7	Tim Torn Teutenberg	Germany	20	2	22	28
8	Benjamin Thomas	France	20	1	21	26
9	Simon Vitzthum	Switzerland	20	1	21	24
10	Gavin Hoover	United States	20	1	21	22
11	Ricardo Peña	Mexico	20	0	20	20
12	Vincent Hoppezak	Netherlands	20	0	20	18
13	Sebastián Mora	Spain	20	0	20	16
14	Alan Banaszek	Poland	20	0	20	14
15	Kelland O'Brien	Australia	0	5	5	12
16	Dylan Bibic	Canada	0	4	4	10
17	Akil Campbell	Trinidad and Tobago	0	0	0	8
18	Jules Hesters	Belgium	0	0	0	6
19	Artyom Zakharov	Kazakhstan	0	0	0	4
20	Daniel Crista	Romania	0	0	0	2
21	João Matias	Portugal	−20	1	−19	1
22	Ángel Pulgar	Venezuela	−20	0	−20	1
23	Yacine Chalel	Algeria	−20	0	−20	1
24	Bernard Van Aert	Indonesia	−20	0	−20	1

=== Elimination race ===
The elimination race was started at 19:41.

Rank	Name	Nation	Event points
1	Benjamin Thomas	France	40
2	Ethan Hayter	Great Britain	38
3	Dylan Bibic	Canada	36
4	Elia Viviani	Italy	34
5	Tim Torn Teutenberg	Germany	32
6	Aaron Gate	New Zealand	30
7	Jules Hesters	Belgium	28
8	Simon Vitzthum	Switzerland	26
9	João Matias	Portugal	24
10	Shunsuke Imamura	Japan	22
11	Akil Campbell	Trinidad and Tobago	20
12	Alan Banaszek	Poland	18
13	Kelland O'Brien	Australia	16
14	Niklas Larsen	Denmark	14
15	Artyom Zakharov	Kazakhstan	12
16	Vincent Hoppezak	Netherlands	10
17	Sebastián Mora	Spain	8
18	Gavin Hoover	United States	6
19	Ángel Pulgar	Venezuela	4
20	Yacine Chalel	Algeria	2
21	Bernard Van Aert	Indonesia	1
22	Ricardo Peña	Mexico	1
23	Daniel Crista	Romania	1
24	Juan Esteban Arango	Colombia	1

=== Points race and overall standings ===
The points race was started at 19:41.

Rank	Name	Nation	Lap points	Sprint points	Total points
1st place, gold medalist(s)	Ethan Hayter	Great Britain	20	17	147
2nd place, silver medalist(s)	Benjamin Thomas	France	20	11	127
3rd place, bronze medalist(s)	Aaron Gate	New Zealand	0	12	118
4	Niklas Larsen	Denmark	40	5	115
5	Tim Torn Teutenberg	Germany	20	5	105
6	Shunsuke Imamura	Japan	0	1	101
7	Elia Viviani	Italy	0	4	100
8	Simon Vitzthum	Switzerland	0	8	82
9	Vincent Hoppezak	Netherlands	20	8	82
10	Dylan Bibic	Canada	0	6	80
11	Jules Hesters	Belgium	20	8	76
12	Alan Banaszek	Poland	20	5	75
13	Kelland O'Brien	Australia	0	5	69
14	Sebastián Mora	Spain	20	6	62
15	Gavin Hoover	United States	0	5	49
16	João Matias	Portugal	0	10	39
17	Ricardo Peña	Mexico	0	2	25
18	Juan Esteban Arango	Colombia	−20	2	16
19	Artyom Zakharov	Kazakhstan	−20	0	2
20	Bernard Van Aert	Indonesia	−20	0	−8
21	Akil Campbell	Trinidad and Tobago	−40	0	−11
22	Ángel Pulgar	Venezuela	−40	0	−27
23	Daniel Crista	Romania	−40	0	−36
24	Yacine Chalel	Algeria	−80	1	−115
