= Portugal at the 2024 Summer Olympics =

- IOC code: POR
- NOC: Olympic Committee of Portugal
- Website: www.comiteolimpicoportugal.pt (in Portuguese)

in Paris, France 26 July 2024 – 11 August 2024
- Competitors: 73 (36 men and 37 women) in 15 sports
- Flag bearers (opening): Fernando Pimenta & Ana Cabecinha
- Flag bearers (closing): Iúri Leitão & Patrícia Sampaio
- Medals Ranked 50th: Gold 1 Silver 2 Bronze 1 Total 4

Summer Olympics appearances (overview)
- 1912; 1920; 1924; 1928; 1932; 1936; 1948; 1952; 1956; 1960; 1964; 1968; 1972; 1976; 1980; 1984; 1988; 1992; 1996; 2000; 2004; 2008; 2012; 2016; 2020; 2024; 2028

Portugal competed at the 2024 Summer Olympics in Paris from 26 July to 11 August 2024. It was the 26th consecutive participation of the nation in the Summer Olympic Games since their debut at the 1912 Summer Olympics in Stockholm.

These were the most successful Olympic Games for Portugal as the delegation won a total of four medals, including one gold, two silvers and one bronze, improving from their previous best-ever participation in Tokyo 2020 (one gold, one silver and two bronzes). For the first time ever, Portugal won medals in Olympic track cycling in their second participation in the discipline (after Tokyo 2020), first in the men's events. By winning a gold medal in the men's Madison and a silver medal in the men's omnium in his Olympic debut, Iúri Leitão became the first Portuguese Olympic champion in a sport outside of athletics and the first Portuguese Olympian to win two medals in a single edition of the Games. Portuguese judokas won a bronze medal for the third consecutive Games, as Patrícia Sampaio (women's 78 kg) followed the footsteps of Jorge Fonseca (men's 100 kg) in Tokyo 2020 and Telma Monteiro (women's 57 kg) in Rio 2016.

== Medalists ==
Medal	Name	Sport	Event	Date
Gold	Iúri Leitão; Rui Oliveira	Cycling	Men's Madison	10 August
Silver	Iúri Leitão	Cycling	Men's omnium	8 August
Silver	Pedro Pichardo	Athletics	Men's triple jump	9 August
Bronze	Patrícia Sampaio	Judo	Women's –78 kg	1 August

Medals by sport
Sport	1st place, gold medalist(s)	2nd place, silver medalist(s)	3rd place, bronze medalist(s)	Total
Judo	0	0	1	1
Athletics	0	1	0	1
Cycling	1	1	0	2
Total	1	2	1	4

Medals by gender
Gender	1st place, gold medalist(s)	2nd place, silver medalist(s)	3rd place, bronze medalist(s)	Total
Female	0	0	1	1
Male	1	2	0	3
Mixed	0	0	0	0
Total	1	2	1	4

Medals by date
Date	1st place, gold medalist(s)	2nd place, silver medalist(s)	3rd place, bronze medalist(s)	Total
01 August	0	0	1	1
08 August	0	1	0	1
09 August	0	1	0	1
10 August	1	0	0	1
Total	1	2	1	4

Multiple medalists
Name	Sport	1st place, gold medalist(s)	2nd place, silver medalist(s)	3rd place, bronze medalist(s)	Total
Iúri Leitão	Cycling	1	1	0	2

== Competitors ==
The competitors taking part in the Games are distributed per sport and per gender as follows:

Sport	Men	Women	Total
Athletics	9	13	22
Breaking	0	1	1
Canoeing	3	1	4
Cycling	4	3	7
Equestrian	3	2	5
Gymnastics	1	1	2
Judo	2	5	7
Sailing	2	2	4
Shooting	0	1	1
Skateboarding	2	0	2
Surfing	0	2	2
Swimming	3	2	5
Table tennis	3	2	5
Tennis	2	0	2
Triathlon	2	2	4
Total	36	37	73

== Athletics ==
Portuguese track and field athletes achieved the entry standards for Paris 2024, either by passing the direct qualifying mark (or time for track and road races) or by world ranking, in the following events (a maximum of 3 athletes each):

Key

- Note–Ranks given for track events are within the athlete's heat only
- Q = Qualified for the next round
- q = Qualified for the next round as a fastest loser or, in field events, by position without achieving the qualifying target
- R = Qualified for the repechage round
- NR = National record
- N/A = Round not applicable for the event
- Bye = Athlete not required to compete in round

Track and road events

Athlete	Event	Heat		Repechage		Semifinal		Final	
Athlete	Event	Result	Rank	Result	Rank	Result	Rank	Result	Rank
João Coelho	Men's 400 m	45.35	4 R	45.64	5	Did not advance			
Isaac Nader	Men's 1500 m	3:35.44	6 Q	Bye		3:34.75	8	Did not advance	
Samuel Barata	Men's marathon	N/A						2:13:23 SB	48
Lorène Bazolo	Women's 100 m	11.38	5	N/A		Did not advance			
Lorène Bazolo	Women's 200 m	23.10	5 R	23.08	4	Did not advance			
Cátia Azevedo	Women's 400 m	52.73	8 R	52.04 SB	5	Did not advance			
Salomé Afonso	Women's 1500 m	4:04.42	5 Q	Bye		3:59.96 PB	12	Did not advance	
Mariana Machado	Women's 5000 m	15:23.26	11	N/A				Did not advance	
Fatoumata Diallo	Women's 400 m hurdles	54.75	2 Q	Bye		54.93	6	Did not advance	
Ana Cabecinha	Women's 20 km walk	N/A						1:46:30	43
Vitória Oliveira	Women's 20 km walk	N/A						1:36:22	38
Susana Santos	Women's marathon	N/A						2:35:57 SB	57

Field events

Athlete	Event	Qualification		Final	
Athlete	Event	Result	Rank	Result	Rank
Pedro Buaró	Men's pole vault	5.40	=25	Did not advance	
Francisco Belo	Men's shot put	NM	–	Did not advance	
Tsanko Arnaudov	Men's shot put	20.31	16	Did not advance	
Pedro Pichardo	Men's triple jump	17.44	1 Q	17.84	2nd place, silver medalist(s)
Tiago Pereira	Men's triple jump	16.36	25	Did not advance	
Leandro Ramos	Men's javelin throw	75.73	28	Did not advance	
Agate de Sousa	Women's long jump	6.34	24	Did not advance	
Jéssica Inchude	Women's shot put	18.36	9 q	18.41	8
Eliana Bandeira	Women's shot put	17.97	15	Did not advance	
Irina Rodrigues	Women's discus throw	62.90	10 q	61.19	9
Liliana Cá	Women's discus throw	62.43	14	Did not advance	

== Breaking ==
Portugal competed in the inaugural Olympic breaking tournaments after securing one of the 16 places in the B-Girls event via performance at the 2024 Olympic Qualifier Series.

Athlete	Nickname	Event	Pre-qualifier	Round robin				Quarterfinal	Semifinal	Final / BM	
Athlete	Nickname	Event	Opposition Result	Opposition Result	Opposition Result	Opposition Result	Rank	Opposition Result	Opposition Result	Opposition Result	Rank
Vanessa Marina	B-Girl Vanessa	B-Girls	Bye	India (NED); L 0–2	671 (CHN); L 0–2	Sunny (USA); L 0–2	4	Did not advance			

== Canoeing ==
=== Sprint ===
Portuguese canoeists qualified boats in each of the following distances for the Games through the 2023 ICF Canoe Sprint World Championships in Duisburg, Germany. On 18 April 2024, after a national trial competition, the Portuguese Canoe Federation officially selected the canoeists that had originally secured the quotas at the World Championships.

Athlete	Event	Heats		Quarterfinals		Semifinals		Final	
Athlete	Event	Time	Rank	Time	Rank	Time	Rank	Time	Rank
Fernando Pimenta	Men's K-1 1000 m	3:29.76	1	Bye		3:29.14	2 FA	3:29.59	6
Messias Baptista; João Ribeiro	Men's K-2 500 m	1:28.10	2	Bye		1:27.64	3 FA	1:27.82	6
Teresa Portela	Women's K-1 500 m	1:51.03	3	1:52.40	4	1:50.28	3 FB	1:52.38	10

Qualification Legend: FA = Qualify to final (medal); FB = Qualify to final B (non-medal); FC = Qualify to final C (non-medal)

== Cycling ==
=== Road ===
Portugal qualified three riders – two men and one woman – to compete in the Olympic road events, by virtue of the nation's UCI World Ranking.

Men

Athlete	Event	Time	Rank
Rui Costa	Road race	6:26:57	46
Rui Costa	Time trial	39:00.07	25
Nelson Oliveira	Road race	6:23:16	33
Nelson Oliveira	Time trial	37:43.15	7

Women

Athlete	Event	Time	Rank
Daniela Campos	Road race	4:07:16	41

=== Track ===
Portugal entered three riders for men's omnium, madison, and women's omnium events, based on the nations performances, through the final UCI Olympic rankings.

Omnium

Athlete	Event	Scratch race		Tempo race		Elimination race		Points race		Total	
Athlete	Event	Rank	Points	Rank	Points	Rank	Points	Rank	Points	Rank	Points
Iúri Leitão	Men's omnium	7	28	2	38	7	28	2	59	2nd place, silver medalist(s)	153
Maria Martins	Women's omnium	13	16	8	26	15	12	15	7	14	61

Madison

Athlete	Event	Points	Laps	Rank
Iúri Leitão; Rui Oliveira	Men's Madison	35	20	1st place, gold medalist(s)

=== Mountain biking ===
Portugal mountain bikers secured one female quota place for the Olympic through the release of the final Olympic mountain biking rankings.

Athlete	Event	Time	Rank
Raquel Queirós	Women's cross-country	LAP (2 laps)	29

== Equestrian ==
Portugal entered a squad of four equestrians. Portuguese equestrians qualified for the team dressage events and individual jumping events, through the establishments of final olympics ranking.

=== Dressage ===
Athlete	Horse	Event	Grand Prix		Grand Prix Special		Grand Prix Freestyle	
Athlete	Horse	Event	Score	Rank	Score	Rank	Score	Rank
Maria Caetano	Hit Plus	Individual	66.630	50	—N/a		Did not advance	
Rita Ralão Duarte	Irao	Individual	68.261	44	—N/a		Did not advance	
António do Vale	Fine Fellow	Individual	66.910	48	—N/a		Did not advance	
Maria Caetano; Rita Ralão Duarte; António do Vale	See above	Team	201.801	12	Did not advance		—N/a	

Qualification Legend: Q = Qualified for the final based on position in group; q = Qualified for the final based on overall position

=== Eventing ===
Athlete	Horse	Event	Dressage		Cross-country			Jumping						Total	
Athlete	Horse	Event	Dressage		Cross-country			Qualifier			Final			Total	
Athlete	Horse	Event	Penalties	Rank	Penalties	Total	Rank	Penalties	Total	Rank	Penalties	Total	Rank	Penalties	Rank
Manuel Grave	Carat de Bremoy	Individual	40.90	59	Eliminated			Did not advance							

=== Jumping ===
Athlete	Horse	Event	Qualification		Final		
Athlete	Horse	Event	Penalties	Rank	Penalties	Time	Rank
Duarte Seabra	Dourados 2	Individual	8	48	Did not advance		

== Gymnastics ==
=== Artistic ===
Portuguese artistic gymnasts secured athlete quota places for the following events in Paris 2024. Rio 2016 and Tokyo 2020 Olympian Ana Filipa Martins booked a spot in the Olympic women's individual all-around event for the third consecutive Games by being one of the top 14 all-arounders from a NOC that did not qualify a team at the 2023 World Artistic Gymnastics Championships in Antwerp, Belgium.

Women

Athlete	Event	Qualification						Final					
Athlete	Event	Apparatus				Total	Rank	Apparatus				Total	Rank
Athlete	Event	V	UB	BB	F	Total	Rank	V	UB	BB	F	Total	Rank
Ana Filipa Martins	All-around	14.133	13.800	12.600	12.633	53.166	18 Q	12.500	13.566	12.700	12.466	51.232	20

=== Trampoline ===
Portugal secured one athlete quota place for the men's Olympic event, after placing two gymnasts in the top eight of the men's individual event at the 2023 World Championships in Birmingham, Great Britain.

Athlete	Event	Qualification		Final	
Athlete	Event	Score	Rank	Score	Rank
Gabriel Albuquerque	Men's	59.750	5 Q	59.740	5

== Judo ==
Portugal qualified seven judoka (two men and five women) for the following weight classes at the Games:

Men

Athlete	Event	Round of 32	Round of 16	Quarterfinals	Semifinals	Repechage	Final / BM	
Athlete	Event	Opposition Result	Opposition Result	Opposition Result	Opposition Result	Opposition Result	Opposition Result	Rank
João Fernando	−81 kg	Gauthier-Drapeau (CAN); L 00–10	Did not advance					
Jorge Fonseca	−100 kg	Bye	Wolf (JPN); L 00–10	Did not advance				

Women

Athlete	Event	Round of 32	Round of 16	Quarterfinals	Semifinals	Repechage	Final / BM	
Athlete	Event	Opposition Result	Opposition Result	Opposition Result	Opposition Result	Opposition Result	Opposition Result	Rank
Catarina Costa	−48 kg	Menz (GER); W 01–00	Narváez (PAR); L 00–10	Did not advance				
Bárbara Timo	−63 kg	Kim (KOR); L 00–10	Did not advance					
Taís Pina	−70 kg	Polling (ITA); L 00–01	Did not advance					
Patrícia Sampaio	−78 kg	Cherotich (KEN); W 10–00	Malonga (FRA); W 11–00	Ma (CHN); W 10–00	Bellandi (ITA); L 00–01	—N/a	Takayama (JPN); W 10–00	3rd place, bronze medalist(s)
Rochele Nunes	+78 kg	Mzougui (TUN); W 10–00	Cerić (BIH); L 00–10	Did not advance				

== Sailing ==
Portuguese sailors qualified one boat in each of the following classes through the 2023 Sailing World Championships, the class-associated World Championships, and the continental regattas.

Elimination events

Athlete	Event	Race																															Final rank
Athlete	Event	1	2	3	4	5	6	7	8	9	10	11	12	13	14	15	16	Pts	Rank	QF	SF1	SF2	SF3	SF4	SF5	SF6	F1	F2	F3	F4	F5	F6	Final rank
Mafalda Pires de Lima	Women's Formula Kite	8	~~16~~	14	13	15	9	Cancelled										59	14	—N/a	Did not advance												14

Medal race events

Athlete	Event	Race											Net points	Final rank
Athlete	Event	1	2	3	4	5	6	7	8	9	10	M*	Net points	Final rank
Eduardo Marques	Men's ILCA7	5	11	31	15	35	1	~~44~~	3	Cancelled		EL	101	11
Diogo Costa; Carolina João	Mixed 470	~~20~~	3	16	14	2	4	2	8	Cancelled		2	53	5

M = Medal race; EL = Eliminated – did not advance into the medal race

== Shooting ==
Portuguese shooters achieved quota places for the following events by virtue of their best finishes at the 2023 European Shotgun Championships:

Athlete	Event	Qualification		Final	
Athlete	Event	Points	Rank	Points	Rank
Maria Inês Barros	Women's trap	121+0	8	Did not advance	

== Skateboarding ==
Portugal will enter two skateboarders in the Olympic competition, one more than at the previous Games, after each secured a top 20 place in their respective event's Olympic World Skating Rankings on 23 June 2024. Gustavo Ribeiro will compete for the second consecutive Games in the men's street event, while Thomas Augusto will make his and Portugal's debut in the men's park event.

Athlete	Event	Qualification		Final	
Athlete	Event	Result	Rank	Result	Rank
Thomas Augusto	Men's park	81.75	13	Did not advance	
Gustavo Ribeiro	Men's street	142.14	17	Did not advance	

== Surfing ==
Portuguese surfers confirmed two quota places for the women's shortboard event. Tokyo 2020 Olympian Teresa Bonvalot finished among the top eight surfers eligible for qualification in the 2023 World Surf League rankings to secure a spot on the Portuguese roster for her second Games. Meanwhile, the other Tokyo 2020 Olympian, Yolanda Hopkins, also qualified for her second Games after securing one of eight eligible quota places at the 2024 World Surfing Games in Arecibo, Puerto Rico.

Athlete	Event	Round 1		Round 2	Round 3	Quarterfinal	Semifinal	Final / BM	
Athlete	Event	Score	Rank	Opposition Result	Opposition Result	Opposition Result	Opposition Result	Opposition Result	Rank
Teresa Bonvalot	Women's shortboard	10.34	3 R2	Matsuda (JPN); L 6.84–9.77	Did not advance				
Yolanda Hopkins	Women's shortboard	7.00	3 R2	Vette (NZL); W 4.67–1.27	Hennessy (CRC); L 12.34–9.90	Did not advance			

Qualification legend: R3 - Qualifies to elimination rounds; R2 - Qualifies to repechage round

== Swimming ==
Portuguese swimmers achieved the entry standards in the following events for Paris 2024 (a maximum of two swimmers under the Olympic Qualifying Time (OQT) and potentially at the Olympic Consideration Time (OCT):

Qualifiers for the latter rounds (Q) of all events were decided on a time only basis, therefore positions shown are overall results versus competitors in all heats.

Men

Athlete	Event	Heat		Semifinal		Final	
Athlete	Event	Time	Rank	Time	Rank	Time	Rank
João Costa	100 m backstroke	54.90	32	Did not advance			
Miguel Nascimento	50 m freestyle	22.49	36	Did not advance			
Diogo Ribeiro	50 m freestyle	21.91	=13 Q	22.01	16	Did not advance	
Diogo Ribeiro	100 m freestyle	48.88	29	Did not advance			
Diogo Ribeiro	100 m butterfly	51.90	20	Did not advance			

Women

Athlete	Event	Heat		Semifinal		Final	
Athlete	Event	Time	Rank	Time	Rank	Time	Rank
Camila Rebelo	200 m backstroke	2:11.26	19	Did not advance			
Angélica André	10 km open water	—N/a				2:06:17.0	12

== Table tennis ==
Portugal qualified a table tennis squad for the men's team event the Games after reaching the quarter-finals of the 2024 World Team Table Tennis Championships in Busan, South Korea. Two of those players will also participate in the men's singles event. In addition, the country qualified two players for the women's singles event at the Games, after Shao Jieni and Fu Yu secured one of five quota places in offer at the 2024 European Olympic Singles Qualification tournament in Sarajevo, Bosnia and Herzegovina.

Athlete	Event	Round of 64	Round of 32	Round of 16	Quarterfinals	Semifinals	Final / BM	
Athlete	Event	Opposition Result	Opposition Result	Opposition Result	Opposition Result	Opposition Result	Opposition Result	Rank
Marcos Freitas	Men's singles	Lind (DEN); L 0–4	Did not advance					
Tiago Apolónia	Men's singles	Qiu (GER); L 1–4	Did not advance					
Marcos Freitas; Tiago Apolónia; João Geraldo	Men's team	—N/a		Brazil; L 1–3	Did not advance			
Shao Jieni	Women's singles	Nutte (LUX); W 4–2	Polcanova (AUT); L 2–4	Did not advance				
Fu Yu	Women's singles	Jeon (KOR); W 4–0	Bajor (POL); L 3–4	Did not advance				

== Tennis ==
Portugal entered two tennis players into the Olympic tournament.

Athlete	Event	Round of 64	Round of 32	Round of 16	Quarterfinals	Semifinals	Final / BM	
Athlete	Event	Opposition Score	Opposition Score	Opposition Score	Opposition Score	Opposition Score	Opposition Score	Rank
Nuno Borges	Men's singles	Navone (ARG); L 2–6, 2–6	Did not advance					
Francisco Cabral	Men's singles	Struff (GER); L 2–6, 2–6	Did not advance					
Nuno Borges; Francisco Cabral	Men's doubles	—N/a	S. Tsitsipas / P. Tsitsipas (GRE); W 3–6, 6–3, [12–10]	Struff / Koepfer (GER); L 2–6, 2–6	Did not advance			

== Triathlon ==
Portugal qualified a team of four triathletes (two men and two women) to compete in the mixed relay event at the Olympics, after finishing as one of the six eligible best-placed NOCs in the World Triathlon Mixed Relay Olympic Qualification Ranking of 25 March 2024.

Individual

Athlete	Event	Time						Rank
Athlete	Event	Swim (1.5 km)	Trans 1	Bike (40 km)	Trans 2	Run (10 km)	Total	Rank
Ricardo Batista	Men's	21:10	0:46	51:29	0:27	30:06	1:43:58	6
Vasco Vilaça	Men's	21:03	0:52	51:30	0:27	30:04	1:43:56	5
Melanie Santos	Women's	24:20	0:57	1:01:00	0:28	37:03	2:03:48	45
Maria Tomé	Women's	24:17	0:56	57:34	0:31	33:55	1:57:13	11

Relay

Athlete	Event	Time						Rank
Athlete	Event	Swim (300 m)	Trans 1	Bike (7 km)	Trans 2	Run (2 km)	Total group	Rank
Ricardo Batista	Mixed relay	4:20	1:12	9:22	0:23	4:59	20:16	—N/a
Melanie Santos	Mixed relay	5:05	1:07	10:27	0:26	5:49	22:54	—N/a
Vasco Vilaça	Mixed relay	4:19	1:01	9:31	0:23	5:02	20:16	—N/a
Maria Tomé	Mixed relay	5:04	1:12	11:02	0:26	5:58	23:42	—N/a
Total	Mixed relay	—N/a					1:27:08	5

== See also ==
- Portugal at the 2024 Winter Youth Olympics
