= 2024 UCI Track Cycling World Championships – Men's omnium =

Men's omnium at the 2024 UCI Track Cycling World Championships
- Venue: Ballerup Super Arena
- Location: Ballerup, Denmark
- Dates: 19 October
- Competitors: 24 from 24 nations
- Winning points: 150

Medalists
gold medal	Lindsay De Vylder	Belgium
silver medal	Simone Consonni	Italy
bronze medal	Yanne Dorenbos	Netherlands

The Men's omnium competition at the 2024 UCI Track Cycling World Championships was held on 19 October 2024.

== Results ==
=== Scratch race ===
The scratch race was started at 13:37.

Rank	Name	Nation	Laps down	Event points
1	Yanne Dorenbos	Netherlands		40
2	Simone Consonni	Italy		38
3	Shunsuke Imamura	Japan		36
4	Grant Koontz	United States		34
5	Rui Oliveira	Portugal		32
6	Alan Banaszek	Poland		30
7	Simon Vitzthum	Switzerland		28
8	Tim Torn Teutenberg	Germany		26
9	Tobias Hansen	Denmark		24
10	Lindsay De Vylder	Belgium		22
11	Dylan Bibic	Canada		20
12	Ethan Hayter	Great Britain		18
13	Oscar Nilsson-Julien	France		16
14	Sebastián Mora	Spain		14
15	Bernard Van Aert	Indonesia		12
16	Jan Voneš	Czech Republic		10
17	Bertold Drijver	Hungary		8
18	Liam Walsh	Australia		6
19	Ramis Dinmukhametov	Kazakhstan		4
20	Juan Esteban Arango	Colombia		2
21	Fernando Gabriel Nava Romo	Mexico		1
22	Harshveer Sekhon	India	–1	1
23	Tso Kai Kwong	Hong Kong	–1	1
24	Akil Campbell	Trinidad and Tobago	–1	1

=== Tempo race ===
The tempo race was started at 15:49.

Rank	Name	Nation	Lap points	Sprint points	Total points	Event points
1	Oscar Nilsson-Julien	France	20	4	24	40
2	Yanne Dorenbos	Netherlands	20	4	24	38
3	Ethan Hayter	Great Britain	20	3	23	36
4	Lindsay De Vylder	Belgium	20	2	22	34
5	Simon Vitzthum	Switzerland	20	1	21	32
6	Simone Consonni	Italy	20	1	21	30
7	Sebastián Mora	Spain	0	6	6	28
8	Tobias Hansen	Denmark	0	4	4	26
9	Rui Oliveira	Portugal	0	3	3	24
10	Alan Banaszek	Poland	0	2	2	22
11	Dylan Bibic	Canada	0	2	2	20
12	Tim Torn Teutenberg	Germany	0	2	2	18
13	Liam Walsh	Australia	0	1	1	16
14	Ramis Dinmukhametov	Kazakhstan	0	1	1	14
15	Grant Koontz	United States	0	0	0	12
16	Jan Voneš	Czech Republic	0	0	0	10
17	Fernando Gabriel Nava Romo	Mexico	0	0	0	8
18	Shunsuke Imamura	Japan	0	0	0	6
19	Tso Kai Kwong	Hong Kong	0	0	0	4
20	Bernard Van Aert	Indonesia	0	0	0	2
21	Juan Esteban Arango	Colombia	0	0	0	1
22	Akil Campbell	Trinidad and Tobago	−20	0	−20	1
23	Harshveer Sekhon	India	−40	0	−40	1
	Bertold Drijver	Hungary	Did not finish			

=== Elimination race ===
The elimination race was started at 19:54.

Rank	Name	Nation	Event points
1	Ethan Hayter	Great Britain	40
2	Rui Oliveira	Portugal	38
3	Simone Consonni	Italy	36
4	Yanne Dorenbos	Netherlands	34
5	Dylan Bibic	Canada	32
6	Sebastián Mora	Spain	30
7	Lindsay De Vylder	Belgium	28
8	Tobias Hansen	Denmark	26
9	Alan Banaszek	Poland	24
10	Simon Vitzthum	Switzerland	22
11	Oscar Nilsson-Julien	France	20
12	Liam Walsh	Australia	18
13	Tim Torn Teutenberg	Germany	16
14	Ramis Dinmukhametov	Kazakhstan	14
15	Shunsuke Imamura	Japan	12
16	Akil Campbell	Trinidad and Tobago	10
17	Bernard Van Aert	Indonesia	8
18	Fernando Gabriel Nava Romo	Mexico	6
19	Jan Voneš	Czech Republic	4
20	Juan Esteban Arango	Colombia	2
21	Harshveer Sekhon	India	1
22	Tso Kai Kwong	Hong Kong	1
23	Grant Koontz	United States	1

=== Points race and overall standings ===
The points race was started at 21:07.

Rank	Name	Nation	Lap points	Sprint points	Total points
1st place, gold medalist(s)	Lindsay De Vylder	Belgium	60	6	150
2nd place, silver medalist(s)	Simone Consonni	Italy	20	14	138
3rd place, bronze medalist(s)	Yanne Dorenbos	Netherlands	0	16	128
4	Oscar Nilsson-Julien	France	40	11	127
5	Ethan Hayter	Great Britain	20	11	125
6	Rui Oliveira	Portugal	20	10	124
7	Sebastián Mora	Spain	40	5	117
8	Tim Torn Teutenberg	Germany	40	6	106
9	Simon Vitzthum	Switzerland	20	3	105
10	Alan Banaszek	Poland	20	2	98
11	Shunsuke Imamura	Japan	40	4	98
12	Tobias Hansen	Denmark	20	1	97
13	Grant Koontz	United States	20	20	87
14	Dylan Bibic	Canada	0	3	75
15	Liam Walsh	Australia	20	3	63
16	Jan Voneš	Czech Republic	0	1	25
17	Fernando Gabriel Nava Romo	Mexico	0	0	15
18	Ramis Dinmukhametov	Kazakhstan	−20	0	12
19	Juan Esteban Arango	Colombia	0	5	10
20	Tso Kai Kwong	Hong Kong	0	0	6
21	Bernard Van Aert	Indonesia	−20	0	2
22	Akil Campbell	Trinidad and Tobago	−40	0	−28
23	Harshveer Sekhon	India	−40	0	−77
