= Cycling at the 2023 Pan American Games – Men's omnium =

Men's omnium at the 2023 Pan American Games
- Venue: Velodrome
- Dates: October 24
- Competitors: 13 from 13 nations

Medalists
Gold medal	Hugo Ruiz	Peru
Silver medal	Ricardo Peña	Mexico
Bronze medal	Jacob Decar	Chile

The men's omnium competition of the cycling events at the 2023 Pan American Games was held on October 24 at the Velodrome in Santiago, Chile.

== Schedule ==
Date	Time	Round
October 24, 2023	11:08	Scratch
October 24, 2023	11:54	Tempo Race
October 24, 2023	18:05	Elimination
October 24, 2023	19:27	Points Race

== Results ==
=== Scratch ===
The race was started at 11:08.

Rank	Name	Nation	Laps down	Event points
1	Armando Reis	Brazil		40
2	Juan Esteban Arango	Colombia	-1	38
3	Jacob Decar	Chile	-1	36
4	Michael Foley	Canada	-1	34
5	Clever Martínez	Venezuela	-1	32
6	Tomás Contte	Argentina	-1	30
7	Ricardo Peña	Mexico	-1	28
8	Anders Johnson	United States	-1	26
9	Akil Campbell	Trinidad and Tobago	-1	24
10	Leonidas Novoa	Ecuador	-1	22
11	Hugo Ruiz	Peru	-1	20
12	Dorian Monterroso	Independent Athletes Team	-1	18
	Steven Polanco	Dominican Republic	-1 DNF	16

=== Tempo Race ===
The race was started at 11:54.

Rank	Name	Nation	Lap points	Total points	Event points
1	Anders Johnson	United States	20	37	40
2	Ricardo Peña	Mexico	20	35	38
3	Hugo Ruiz	Peru		4	36
4	Juan Esteban Arango	Colombia			34
5	Tomás Contte	Argentina			32
6	Jacob Decar	Chile			30
7	Leonidas Novoa	Ecuador			28
8	Michael Foley	Canada			26
9	Armando Reis	Brazil			24
10	Akil Campbell	Trinidad and Tobago			22
11	Clever Martínez	Venezuela			20
12	Dorian Monterroso	Independent Athletes Team			18
	Steven Polanco	Dominican Republic	DNS		

=== Elimination ===
The race was started at 18:05.

Rank	Name	Nation	Event points
1	Jacob Decar	Chile	40
2	Michael Foley	Canada	38
3	Hugo Ruiz	Peru	36
4	Ricardo Peña	Mexico	34
5	Juan Esteban Arango	Colombia	32
6	Leonidas Novoa	Ecuador	30
7	Anders Johnson	United States	28
8	Dorian Monterroso	Independent Athletes Team	26
9	Tomás Contte	Argentina	24
10	Armando Reis	Brazil	22
	Clever Martínez	Venezuela	20
	Akil Campbell	Trinidad and Tobago	18
	Steven Polanco	Dominican Republic	16

=== Points Race ===
The race was started at 19:27.

Rank	Name	Nation	Lap points	Event points
1	Ricardo Peña	Mexico		24
2	Jacob Decar	Chile		15
3	Michael Foley	Canada		16
4	Juan Esteban Arango	Colombia		16
5	Anders Johnson	United States		16
6	Hugo Ruiz	Peru	20	13
7	Tomás Contte	Argentina		8
8	Armando Reis	Brazil		12
	Leonidas Novoa	Ecuador	-40	1
	Clever Martínez	Venezuela		
	Akil Campbell	Trinidad and Tobago		
	Dorian Monterroso	Independent Athletes Team		
	Steven Polanco	Dominican Republic		

=== Final standings ===
The final classification determined the overall standings.

Rank	Name	Nation	Scratch	Tempo	Elimination	Points Race	Total
1st place, gold medalist(s)	Hugo Ruiz	Peru	20	36	36	33	125
2nd place, silver medalist(s)	Ricardo Peña	Mexico	28	38	34	24	124
3rd place, bronze medalist(s)	Jacob Decar	Chile	36	20	40	15	121
4	Juan Esteban Arango	Colombia	38	34	32	16	120
5	Michael Foley	Canada	34	26	38	16	114
6	Anders Johnson	United States	26	40	28	16	110
7	Armando Reis	Brazil	40	24	22	12	98
8	Tomás Contte	Argentina	30	32	24	8	94
	Leonidas Novoa	Ecuador	22	28	30		DNF
	Clever Martínez	Venezuela	32	20	20		DNS
	Akil Campbell	Trinidad and Tobago	24	22	18		DNS
	Dorian Monterroso	Independent Athletes Team	18	18	26		DNS
	Steven Polanco	Dominican Republic	16	DNS	16		DNS
