= Cycling at the 2024 Summer Olympics – Men's omnium =

Men's Omnium at the Games of the XXXIII Olympiad
- Olympic track cycling
- Venues: Vélodrome National de Saint-Quentin-en-Yvelines
- Date: 8 August 2024

Medalists
1st place, gold medalist(s)		Benjamin Thomas	France
2nd place, silver medalist(s)		Iúri Leitão	Portugal
3rd place, bronze medalist(s)		Fabio Van den Bossche	Belgium

The men's omnium event at the 2024 Summer Olympics took place on 8 August 2024 at the Vélodrome National de Saint-Quentin-en-Yvelines.

== Background ==
This was the fourth appearance of the event, what has been held at every Summer Olympics since its introduction in 2012.

== Competition format ==
An omnium is a multiple-race event, and the current event features four different types of races.

The entire event is contested within a single day, but there are breaks between each race.

The winner of the omnium is the cyclist who obtains the most points through the four races. The winner of each of the first three races earns 40 points, the second-place cyclist earns 38, the third-place rider 36, and so forth, and the final race has special scoring rules. The races in the omnium are:

- Scratch race: Mass start race; first to finish is the winner. Distance is 7.5 km (30 laps).
- Tempo race: The new race for 2020, the distance is 7.5 km (30 laps). After the first five laps, the winner of each lap earns one point, and lapping the field earns 20 points. The winner of the race is the cyclist with the most points (the points earned within the tempo race do not count for the omnium total: they are used only to place cyclists for this race).
- Elimination race: Every two laps, the last-place cyclist is eliminated.
- Points race: A 25 km (100 lap) points race, with points earned for sprints (5/3/2/1, every 10 laps, with double points for the final sprint) and for lapping the field (20 points).

There is only one round of competition.

== Schedule ==
All times are Central European Time (UTC+2)

Date	Time	Round
8 August 2024	17:00; 17:38; 18:25; 19:27	Scratch race Tempo race Elimination race Points race

== Results ==
=== Scratch race ===
Rank	Cyclist	Nation	Laps down	Event points
1	Benjamin Thomas	France		40
2	Niklas Larsen	Denmark		38
3	Fabio Van den Bossche	Belgium		36
4	Jan-Willem van Schip	Netherlands		34
5	Kazushige Kuboki	Japan	–1	32
6	Ethan Hayter	Great Britain	–1	30
7	Iúri Leitão	Portugal	–1	28
8	Albert Torres	Spain	–1	26
9	Aaron Gate	New Zealand	–1	24
10	Tim Torn Teutenberg	Germany	–1	22
11	Alex Vogel	Switzerland	–1	20
12	Elia Viviani	Italy	–1	18
13	Tim Wafler	Austria	–1	16
14	Sam Welsford	Australia	–1	14
15	Grant Koontz	United States	–1	12
16	Dylan Bibic	Canada	–1	10
17	Jan Voneš	Czech Republic	–1	8
18	Bernard Van Aert	Indonesia	–1	6
19	Alan Banaszek	Poland	–1	4
20	Fernando Gaviria	Colombia	–2	2
21	Ricardo Peña	Mexico	–2	1
22	Youssef Abouelhassan	Egypt	–4	–39

=== Tempo race ===
Rank	Name	Nation	Race points	Event points
1	Fabio Van den Bossche	Belgium	31	40
2	Iúri Leitão	Portugal	28	38
3	Tim Torn Teutenberg	Germany	25	36
4	Alex Vogel	Switzerland	23	34
5	Jan Voneš	Czech Republic	22	32
6	Niklas Larsen	Denmark	22	30
7	Albert Torres	Spain	21	28
8	Aaron Gate	New Zealand	21	26
9	Grant Koontz	United States	21	24
10	Elia Viviani	Italy	1	22
11	Benjamin Thomas	France	1	20
12	Ethan Hayter	Great Britain	0	18
13	Jan-Willem van Schip	Netherlands	0	16
14	Fernando Gaviria	Colombia	0	14
15	Kazushige Kuboki	Japan	0	12
16	Tim Wafler	Austria	0	10
17	Alan Banaszek	Poland	0	8
18	Sam Welsford	Australia	0	6
19	Ricardo Peña	Mexico	0	4
20	Bernard Van Aert	Indonesia	0	2
21	Dylan Bibic	Canada	0	1
22	Youssef Abouelhassan	Egypt	–20	1

=== Elimination race ===
Rank	Name	Nation	Event points
1	Ethan Hayter	Great Britain	40
2	Elia Viviani	Italy	38
3	Benjamin Thomas	France	36
4	Tim Torn Teutenberg	Germany	34
5	Sam Welsford	Australia	32
6	Fabio Van den Bossche	Belgium	30
7	Iúri Leitão	Portugal	28
8	Fernando Gaviria	Colombia	26
9	Alan Banaszek	Poland	24
10	Kazushige Kuboki	Japan	22
11	Aaron Gate	New Zealand	20
12	Dylan Bibic	Canada	18
13	Albert Torres	Spain	16
14	Jan Voneš	Czech Republic	14
15	Youssef Abouelhassan	Egypt	12
16	Niklas Larsen	Denmark	10
17	Alex Vogel	Switzerland	8
18	Grant Koontz	United States	6
19	Tim Wafler	Austria	4
20	Ricardo Peña	Mexico	2
21	Jan-Willem van Schip	Netherlands	1
22	Bernard Van Aert	Indonesia	1

=== Points race and final standings ===
Rank	Name	Nation	SR	TR	ER	Subtotal	Sprint points	Lap points	Finish order	Total points
1st place, gold medalist(s)	Benjamin Thomas	France	40	20	38	98	26	40	2	164
2nd place, silver medalist(s)	Iúri Leitão	Portugal	28	38	28	94	19	40	3	153
3rd place, bronze medalist(s)	Fabio Van den Bossche	Belgium	36	40	30	106	5	20	8	131
4	Albert Torres	Spain	26	28	16	70	17	40	1	127
5	Aaron Gate	New Zealand	24	26	20	70	13	40	4	123
6	Kazushige Kuboki	Japan	32	12	22	66	7	40	10	113
7	Tim Torn Teutenberg	Germany	22	36	36	94	4	0	17	98
8	Ethan Hayter	Great Britain	30	18	40	88	9	0	5	97
9	Elia Viviani	Italy	18	22	34	74	3	20	7	97
10	Niklas Larsen	Denmark	38	30	10	78	6	0	13	84
11	Alex Vogel	Switzerland	20	34	8	62	0	0	18	62
12	Jan Voneš	Czech Republic	8	32	14	54	2	0	11	56
13	Tim Wafler	Austria	16	10	4	30	5	20	9	55
14	Sam Welsford	Australia	14	6	32	52	0	0	16	52
15	Jan-Willem van Schip	Netherlands	34	16	1	51	0	0	12	51
16	Grant Koontz	United States	12	24	6	42	0	0	6	42
17	Fernando Gaviria	Colombia	2	14	26	42	0	0	14	42
18	Alan Banaszek	Poland	4	8	24	36	5	0	21	41
19	Dylan Bibic	Canada	10	1	18	29	0	0	20	29
20	Bernard Van Aert	Indonesia	6	2	1	9	0	-40	15	-31
21	Ricardo Peña	Mexico	1	4	2	7	0	-40	19	-33
22	Youssef Abouelhassan	Egypt	-39	1	12	-26	0	-40	DNF	-66
