= António do Vale =

Portuguese dressage rider (born 1982)

Personal information
- Born: 3 April 1982 (age 44) Lisbon, Portugal
- Occupation: Professional equestrian
- Height: 179 cm (5 ft 10 in)
- Spouse: Joana do Vale

Sport
- Country: Portugal
- Sport: Equestrian
- Event: Dressage

Achievements and titles
- Olympic finals: 2024 Summer Olympics

António do Vale (born 3 April 1982) is a Portuguese dressage rider. Originally selected as a travelling reserve rider for Portugal at the 2024 Summer Olympics, he was promoted to a team rider along with Fine Fellow-H, when Joao Moreira withdrew after his mount Furst Kennedy required an operation.

Do Vale and his wife, Joana do Vale, are both Grand Prix dressage riders. They have five children together and are based in Lastrup, Germany.
