= 2026 UCI Track Cycling World Championships – Men's scratch =

Men's scratch at the 2026 UCI Track Cycling World Championships
- Venue: Shanghai Velodrome
- Location: Shanghai, China
- Dates: 15 October
- Competitors: 24 from 24 nations

Medalists
gold medal	Matthew Bostock	Great Britain
silver medal	Tom Sexton	New Zealand
bronze medal	Lindsay De Vylder	Belgium

The Men's scratch competition at the 2026 UCI Track Cycling World Championships was held on 15 October 2026.

== Results ==
The race was started at 19:30. First rider across the line without a net lap loss won.

Rank	Name	Nation	Laps down
1st place, gold medalist(s)	Matthew Bostock	Great Britain	
2nd place, silver medalist(s)	Tom Sexton	New Zealand	
3rd place, bronze medalist(s)	Lindsay De Vylder	Belgium	
4	Thomas Cornish	Australia	
5	Yanne Dorenbos	Netherlands	
6	Tim Torn Teutenberg	Germany	
7	Raphael Kokas	Austria	
8	Graeme Frislie	United States	
9	Clever Martínez	Venezuela	
10	Bryan Coquard	France	
11	Filip Prokopyszyn	Poland	
12	Shunsuke Imamura	Japan	
13	Ramazan Yılmaz	Turkey	
14	Diogo Narciso	Portugal	
15	Tobias Hansen	Denmark	
16	Matyáš Koblížek	Czechia	
17	Álvaro Navas	Spain	
18	Davide Stella	Italy	
19	Ilya Savekin	Individual Neutral Athletes	
20	Red Walters	Grenada	
21	Alisher Zhumakan	Kazakhstan	
22	Alex Vogel	Switzerland	
23	Fernando Nava	Mexico	DNF
23	Pei Zhengyu	China	DNF
