= 2021 UEC European Track Championships – Men's omnium =

Cycling competition

Men's omnium at the 2021 UEC European Track Championships
- Venue: Tissot Velodrome, Grenchen
- Date: 8 October
- Competitors: 24 from 24 nations
- Winning points: 136

Medalists
gold medal	Alan Banaszek	Poland
silver medal	Fabio Van den Bossche	Belgium
bronze medal	Matias Malmberg	Denmark

The men's omnium competition at the 2021 UEC European Track Championships was held on 8 October 2021.

== Results ==
=== Scratch race ===
Rank	Name	Nation	Laps down	Event points
1	Roy Eefting	Netherlands		40
2	Matias Malmberg	Denmark		38
3	Francesco Lamon	Italy		36
4	Thomas Boudat	France		34
5	Alan Banaszek	Poland		32
6	Oliver Wood	Great Britain		30
7	Denis Rugovac	Czech Republic		28
8	Sebastián Mora	Spain		26
9	Tim Torn Teutenberg	Germany		24
10	Maksym Vasyliev	Ukraine		22
11	João Matias	Portugal		20
12	Daniel Crista	Romania		18
13	Fabio Van den Bossche	Belgium		16
14	Simon Vitzthum	Switzerland		14
15	JB Murphy	Ireland		12
16	Itamar Einhorn	Israel		10
17	Dzianis Mazur	Belarus		8
18	Andreas Graf	Austria		6
19	Zisis Soulios	Greece		4
20	Justas Beniušis	Lithuania		2
21	Gleb Syritsa	Russia		1
22	Martin Chren	Slovakia		1
23	Viktor Filutas	Hungary	–1	1
24	Nikolay Genov	Bulgaria	–2	–39

=== Tempo race ===
Rank	Name	Nation	Points in race	Event points
1	Matias Malmberg	Denmark	9	40
2	Alan Banaszek	Poland	6	38
3	Oliver Wood	Great Britain	5	36
4	Thomas Boudat	France	3	34
5	Tim Torn Teutenberg	Germany	3	32
6	Fabio Van den Bossche	Belgium	3	30
7	JB Murphy	Ireland	2	28
8	Francesco Lamon	Italy	1	26
9	Simon Vitzthum	Switzerland	1	24
10	Roy Eefting	Netherlands	0	22
11	Sebastián Mora	Spain	0	20
12	João Matias	Portugal	0	18
13	Maksym Vasyliev	Ukraine	0	16
14	Dzianis Mazur	Belarus	0	14
15	Viktor Filutas	Hungary	0	12
16	Denis Rugovac	Czech Republic	0	10
17	Justas Beniušis	Lithuania	–18	8
18	Daniel Crista	Romania	–19	6
19	Gleb Syritsa	Russia	–20	4
20	Zisis Soulios	Greece	–20	2
21	Itamar Einhorn	Israel	–20	1
22	Andreas Graf	Austria	–40	–39
23	Martin Chren	Slovakia	–40	–39
24	Nikolay Genov	Bulgaria	DNF	–39

=== Elimination race ===
Rank	Name	Nation	Event points
1	Thomas Boudat	France	40
2	Matias Malmberg	Denmark	38
3	Alan Banaszek	Poland	36
4	Fabio Van den Bossche	Belgium	34
5	Tim Torn Teutenberg	Germany	32
6	Denis Rugovac	Czech Republic	30
7	Sebastián Mora	Spain	28
8	Oliver Wood	Great Britain	26
9	Simon Vitzthum	Switzerland	24
10	Viktor Filutas	Hungary	22
11	João Matias	Portugal	20
12	Maksym Vasyliev	Ukraine	18
13	Dzianis Mazur	Belarus	16
14	Gleb Syritsa	Russia	14
15	Francesco Lamon	Italy	12
16	Justas Beniušis	Lithuania	10
17	Itamar Einhorn	Israel	8
18	Nikolay Genov	Bulgaria	6
19	Andreas Graf	Austria	4
20	Roy Eefting	Netherlands	2
21	Zisis Soulios	Greece	1
22	JB Murphy	Ireland	1
23	Daniel Crista	Romania	1
24	Martin Chren	Slovakia	1

=== Points race and final standings ===
The final ranking is given by the sum of the points obtained in the 4 specialties.

Overall rank	Name	Nation	Scratch race	Tempo race	Elim. race	Subotal	Lap points	Sprint points	Finish order	Total points
1st place, gold medalist(s)	Alan Banaszek	Poland	32	38	36	106	20	10	15	136
2nd place, silver medalist(s)	Fabio Van den Bossche	Belgium	16	30	34	80	40	10	4	130
3rd place, bronze medalist(s)	Matias Malmberg	Denmark	38	40	38	116	0	8	3	124
4	Oliver Wood	Great Britain	30	36	26	92	20	5	5	117
5	Tim Torn Teutenberg	Germany	24	32	32	88	20	8	8	116
6	Francesco Lamon	Italy	36	26	12	74	40	2	13	116
7	Thomas Boudat	France	34	34	40	108	0	7	7	115
8	Sebastián Mora	Spain	26	20	28	74	20	19	1	113
9	Roy Eefting	Netherlands	40	22	2	64	40	1	22	105
10	João Matias	Portugal	20	18	20	58	20	11	2	89
11	JB Murphy	Ireland	12	28	1	41	40	8	14	89
12	Denis Rugovac	Czech Republic	28	10	30	68	20	0	24	88
13	Simon Vitzthum	Switzerland	14	24	24	62	20	3	11	85
14	Maksym Vasyliev	Ukraine	22	16	18	56	0	6	9	62
15	Viktor Filutas	Hungary	1	12	22	35	0	5	12	40
16	Dzianis Mazur	Belarus	8	14	16	38	0	2	18	40
17	Daniel Crista	Romania	18	6	1	25	0	0	23	25
18	Gleb Syritsa	Russia	1	4	14	19	0	5	6	24
19	Itamar Einhorn	Israel	10	1	8	19	0	5	19	24
20	Justas Beniušis	Lithuania	2	8	10	20	0	3	17	23
21	Zisis Soulios	Greece	4	2	1	7	0	3	10	10
22	Andreas Graf	Austria	6	–39	4	–29	0	0	16	–29
23	Martin Chren	Slovakia	1	–39	1	–37	0	0	20	–37
24	Nikolay Genov	Bulgaria	–39	–39	6	–72	0	0	21	–72
