= 2024 UCI Track Cycling World Championships – Men's madison =

Men's madison at the 2024 UCI Track Cycling World Championships
- Venue: Ballerup Super Arena
- Location: Ballerup, Denmark
- Dates: 20 October
- Competitors: 36 from 18 nations
- Teams: 18
- Winning points: 76

Medalists
gold medal	Roger Kluge; Tim Torn Teutenberg	Germany
silver medal	Lindsay De Vylder; Fabio Van Den Bossche	Belgium
bronze medal	Niklas Larsen; Michael Mørkøv	Denmark

The Men's madison competition at the 2024 UCI Track Cycling World Championships was held on 20 October 2024.

== Results ==
The race was started at 15:50.

Rank	Riders	Nation	Laps points	Sprint points	Total points
1st place, gold medalist(s)	Roger Kluge; Tim Torn Teutenberg	Germany	40	36	76
2nd place, silver medalist(s)	Lindsay De Vylder; Fabio Van Den Bossche	Belgium	20	30	60
3rd place, bronze medalist(s)	Niklas Larsen; Michael Mørkøv	Denmark	20	39	59
4	Ivo Oliveira; Rui Oliveira	Portugal	40	13	53
5	Ethan Hayter; Mark Stewart	Great Britain	20	23	43
6	Yoeri Havik; Vincent Hoppezak	Netherlands	20	23	43
7	Simone Consonni; Elia Viviani	Italy	0	18	18
8	Lukas Rüegg; Valere Thiebaud	Switzerland	0	10	10
9	Oscar Nilsson-Julien; Clément Petit	France	0	7	7
10	Shunsuke Imamura; Kazushige Kuboki	Japan	−20	13	−7
11	Denis Rugovac; Jan Voneš	Czech Republic	−20	13	−7
12	Kelland O'Brien; Blake Agnoletto	Australia	−40	24	−16
13	Alan Banaszek; Filip Prokopyszyn	Poland	−60	0	−60
14	Colby Lange; Peter Moore	United States	−60	0	−60
–	Dylan Bibic; Mathias Guillemette	Canada	Did not finish		
–	Erik Martorell; Álvaro Navas	Spain	Did not finish		
–	Chu Tsun Wai; Tso Kai Kwong	Hong Kong	Did not finish		
–	Vladyslav Loginov; Alon Yogev	Israel	Did not finish		
