= Matthew Bostock =

Manx cyclist

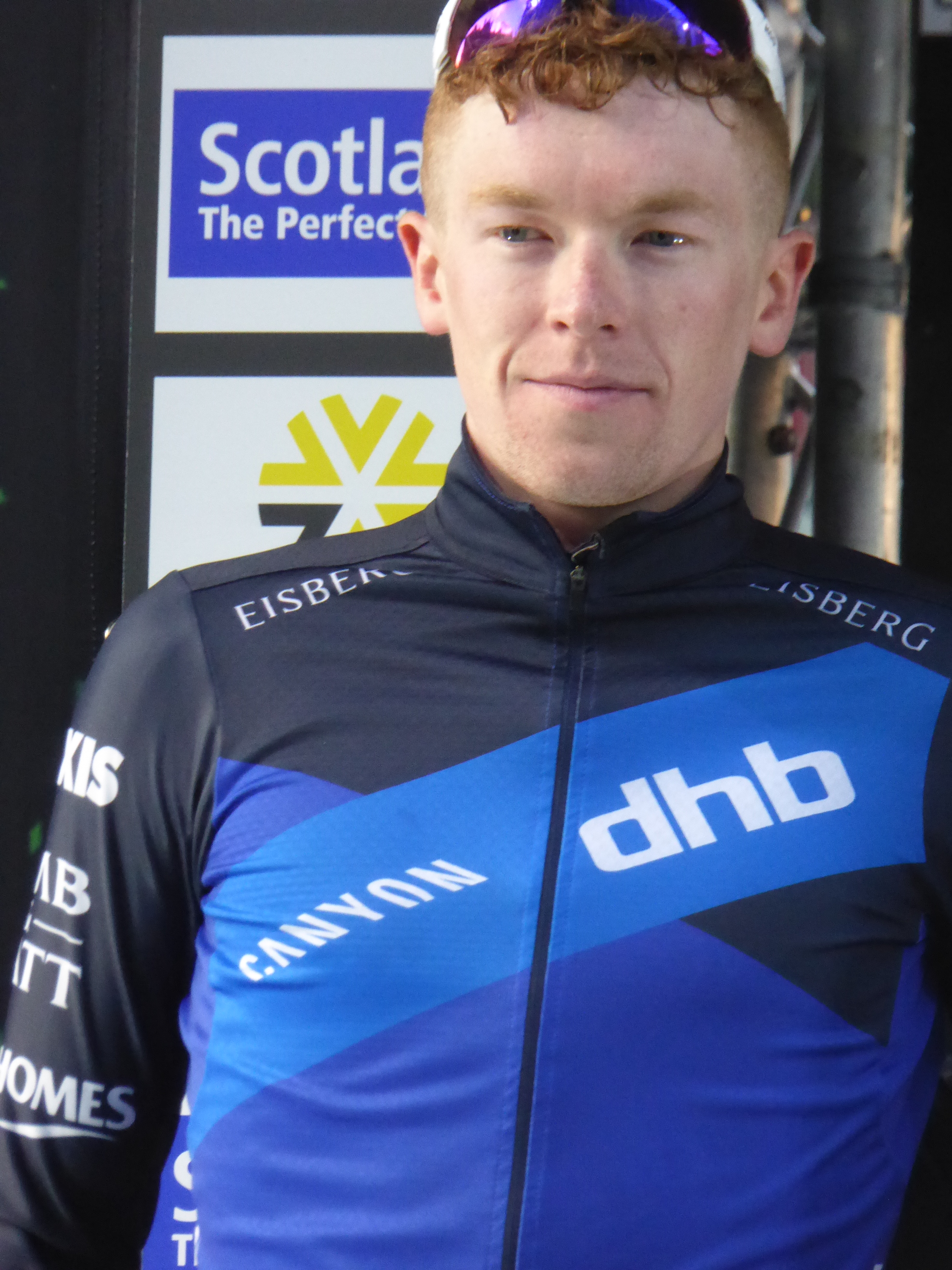
- Bostock in 2019

Personal information
- Full name: Matthew John Bostock
- Born: 16 July 1997 (age 29) Douglas, Isle of Man
- Height: 1.83 m (6 ft 0 in)
- Weight: 69 kg (152 lb)

Cycling career
- Sport: Cycling
- Current team: Tekkerz CC
- Disciplines: Track; Road
- Role: Rider

Amateur teams
- 2016–2018: 100% Me
- 2024: Ribble Rebellion
- 2025–: Tekkerz CC

Professional teams
- 2019–2022: Canyon dhb p/b Bloor Homes
- 2023: Bolton Equities Black Spoke

Major wins
- Track World Championships Scratch (2026)
Medal record
Men's track cycling
Representing Great Britain
World Championships
Gold medal – first place	2026 Shanghai	Scratch
Bronze medal – third place	2026 Shanghai	Team pursuit
European Championships
Bronze medal – third place	2016 Yvelines	Team pursuit
Bronze medal – third place	2026 Konya	Team pursuit
Representing Isle of Man
Commonwealth Games
Gold medal – first place	2026 Glasgow	Points race

Matthew John Bostock (born 16 July 1997) is a Manx road and track cyclist, who rides for British amateur team Tekkerz CC. He is the 2026 world champion in the scratch race, the 2026 Commonwealth points race champion and two-time European medallist in the team pursuit.

== Career ==
At the 2022 Commonwealth Games in Birmingham, Bostock was one of several riders involved in a serious crash during the heats of the Men's Scratch Race. Bostock was one of two riders taken to hospital.

At the 2026 Commonwealth Games, he won the gold medal in the 40 km points race, and at the 2026 UCI Track Cycling World Championships, he won the scratch race, his first world title.

== Major results ==
=== Road ===
2015
3rd Overall Driedaagse van Axel
2017
4th Beaumont Trophy
2019
National Circuit Series

1st Otley
1st Abergavenny
1st Newcastle
1st Colne
1st Barnsley

1st Birkenhead, Tour Series
National Championships

2nd Under-23 road race
3rd Circuit race

6th Youngster Coast Challenge
2020
3rd Dorpenomloop Rucphen
2021
6th Heistse Pijl
7th Cholet-Pays de la Loire
10th Circuit de Wallonie
2022
National Championships

1st Circuit race
5th Road race

Tour Series

1st Sprints classification
1st Clacton-on-Sea
1st Manchester

2nd Overall Tour de la Mirabelle

1st Points classification
1st Stage 4

8th Elfstedenronde
2023
5th Overall Tour of Taihu Lake
2024
2nd Overall National Circuit Series

1st Otley
1st Dudley
1st Colne
1st Beverley

2025
2nd Otley Grand Prix
3rd Circuit race, National Road Championships
4th Lincoln Grand Prix

=== Track ===
2016
1st Team pursuit, UCI World Cup, Glasgow
2nd Madison, National Championships (with Matt Walls)
3rd Team pursuit, UEC European Championships
3rd Team pursuit, UEC European Under-23 Championships
2017
1st Team pursuit, UEC European Under-23 Championships
2nd Team pursuit, National Championships
2018
1st Team pursuit, UEC European Under-23 Championships
2026
UCI World Championships

1st Scratch
3rd Team pursuit

1st Points race, Commonwealth Games
National Championships

1st Elimination
1st Scratch

3rd Team pursuit, UEC European Championships
