= Youssef Abouelhassan =

Egyptian cyclist

Personal information
- Full name: Youssef Ahmed ZAKY Abouelhassan
- Nickname: YOUSIF ZAKI
- Born: 7 December 2001 (age 24) Suez, Egypt
- Height: 1.79 m (5 ft 10 in)
- Weight: 74 kg (163 lb)

Cycling career
- Sport: Cycling
- Disciplines: Track; Road
- Role: Rider
- Rider type: Endurance
Medal record
Representing Egypt
Men's road cycling
African Youth Games
Gold medal – first place	2018 Algeria	Individual time trial-ITT
African Championships
Bronze medal – third place	2022 Sharm El Sheikh	Team time trial
Silver medal – second place	2022 Sharm El Sheikh	Individual time trial U23
Men's track cycling
African Championships
Gold medal – first place	2018 Casablanca	point race
Gold medal – first place	2018 Casablanca	Team pursuit race
Gold medal – first place	2018 Casablanca	Team sprint race
Silver medal – second place	2018 Casablanca	Individual pursuit race
Silver medal – second place	2018 Casablanca	Scratch race
Bronze medal – third place	2018 Casablanca	Time Trial race 1 kilo
Gold medal – first place	2019 South Africa	Time Trial race 1 kilo
Gold medal – first place	2020 Cairo	Team pursuit race
Bronze medal – third place	2020 Cairo	Team sprint race
Bronze medal – third place	2020 Cairo	Individual pursuit race
Silver medal – second place	2021 Cairo	Team sprint race
Gold medal – first place	2022 Abuja	Elimination race
Gold medal – first place	2022 Abuja	Team sprint
Silver medal – second place	2022 Abuja	Madison
Bronze medal – third place	2022 Abuja	Team pursuit
Silver medal – second place	2023 Cairo	Team pursuit
Silver medal – second place	2023 Cairo	Madison
Silver medal – second place	2024 Cairo	Team pursuit
Silver medal – second place	2024 Cairo	Madison
Bronze medal – third place	2024 Cairo	Elimination race
Bronze medal – third place	2024 Cairo	Scratch

Youssef Ahmed Zaky Abouelhassan (born 7 December 2001) is an Egyptian cyclist. He competed in the men's omnium event at the 2024 Summer Olympics.
