= 2025 UCI Track Cycling World Championships – Men's madison =

Men's madison at the 2025 UCI Track Cycling World Championships
- Venue: Velódromo Peñalolén
- Location: Santiago, Chile
- Dates: 26 October
- Competitors: 36 from 18 nations
- Teams: 18
- Winning points: 81

Medalists
gold medal	Lindsay De Vylder; Fabio Van den Bossche	Belgium
silver medal	Mark Stewart; Josh Tarling	Great Britain
bronze medal	Niklas Larsen; Lasse Norman Leth	Denmark

The Men's madison competition at the 2025 UCI Track Cycling World Championships was held on 26 October 2025.

== Results ==
The race was started at 15:58.

Rank	Riders	Nation	Laps points	Sprint points	Total points
1st place, gold medalist(s)	Lindsay De Vylder; Fabio Van Den Bossche	Belgium	40	41	81
2nd place, silver medalist(s)	Mark Stewart; Joshua Tarling	United Kingdom	40	33	73
3rd place, bronze medalist(s)	Niklas Larsen; Lasse Norman Leth	Denmark	40	31	71
4	Moritz Augenstein; Roger Kluge	Germany	40	24	64
5	Iúri Leitão; Diogo Narciso	Portugal	20	26	46
6	Yanne Dorenbos; Vincent Hoppezak	Netherlands	20	15	35
7	Oscar Nilsson-Julien; Clément Petit	France	20	15	35
8	Tom Sexton; Keegan Hornblow	New Zealand	20	12	32
9	Peter Moore; Graeme Frislie	United States	20	9	29
10	Héctor Álvarez; Albert Torres	Spain	20	8	28
11	Juan David Sierra; Davide Stella	Italy	20	4	24
12	Naoki Kojima; Kazushige Kuboki	Japan	0	5	5
13	Oliver Bleddyn; Blake Agnoletto	Australia	0	4	4
14	Raphael Kokas; Maximilian Schmidbauer	Austria	0	2	2
15	Adam Křenek; Jan Voneš	Czech Republic	0	2	2
16	Daniel Staniszewski; Wojciech Pszczolarski	Poland	0	0	0
–	Mats Poot; Pascal Tappeiner	Switzerland	Did not finish		
–	Diego Rojas; Cristián Arriagada	Chile	Did not finish		
