= 2017 UEC European Track Championships – Men's points race =

Men's points race at the 2017 UEC European Track Championships
- UEC European Champion jersey
- Venue: Velodrom, Berlin
- Date: 21 October
- Competitors: 24 from 24 nations

Medalists
gold medal	Alan Banaszek	Poland
silver medal	Niklas Larsen	Denmark
bronze medal	Maximilian Beyer	Germany

The Men's points race was held on 21 October 2017. 24 riders participated over a distance of 40 km (160 laps), with sprints every 10 laps awarding 5, 3, 2 or 1 point to the first four (double in the final sprint); 20 points are also awarded/withdrawn for each lap gained/lost respectively.

== Results ==
Rank	Name	Nation	Sprint points	Lap points	Finish order	Total points
1st place, gold medalist(s)	Alan Banaszek	Poland	29	20	13	49
2nd place, silver medalist(s)	Niklas Larsen	Denmark	24	20	1	44
3rd place, bronze medalist(s)	Maximilian Beyer	Germany	14	20	2	34
4	Andreas Müller	Austria	9	20	3	29
5	Christos Volikakis	Greece	8	20	5	28
6	Krisztián Lovassy	Hungary	8	20	6	28
7	Liam Bertazzo	Italy	22	0	4	22
8	Denis Nekrasov	Russia	2	20	12	22
9	Anders Oddli	Norway	19	0	10	19
10	Moreno De Pauw	Belgium	13	0	15	13
11	Louis Pijourlet	France	10	0	17	10
12	Jan-Willem van Schip	Netherlands	6	0	8	6
13	Mark Downey	Ireland	6	0	9	6
14	Sebastián Mora	Spain	6	0	14	6
15	Maksym Vasilyev	Ukraine	4	0	7	4
16	Yauheni Karaliok	Belarus	3	0	18	3
17	Mark Stewart	Great Britain	3	–20	11	–17
18	Cyrille Thièry	Switzerland	0	–40	16	–40
19	Andrej Strmiska	Slovakia	0	–40	19	–40
–	Jacob Wihk	Sweden	0	0	–	DNF
–	Cesar Martingil	Portugal	0	–20	–	DNF
–	Vitālijs Korņilovs	Latvia	0	–40	–	DNF
–	Marius Petrache	Romania	0	−40	–	DNF
–	Nicolas Pietrula	Czech Republic	0	−60	–	DNF
