= Lindsay De Vylder =

Belgian cyclist (born 1995)

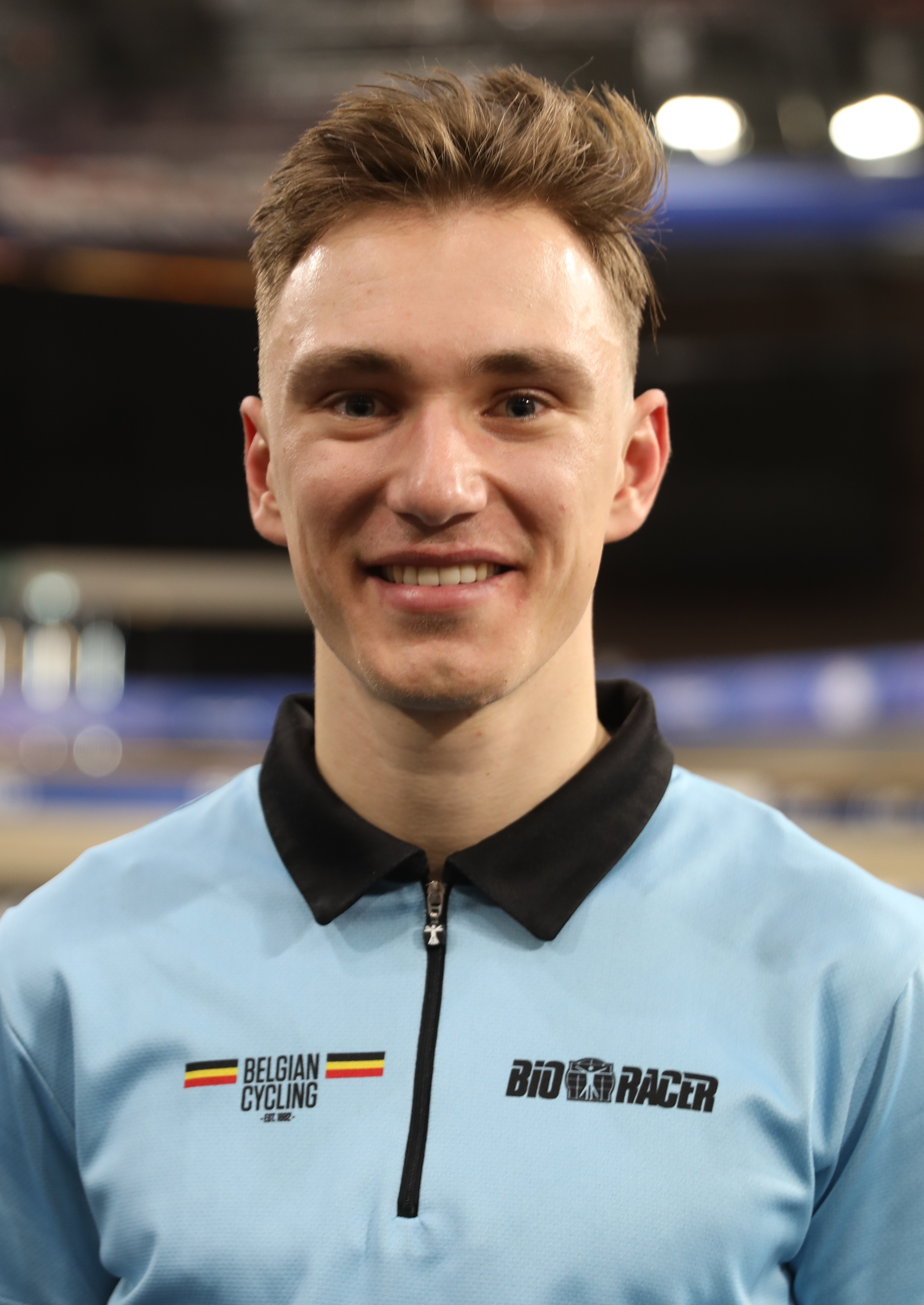
- De Vylder in 2024

Personal information
- Full name: Lindsay De Vylder
- Born: 30 May 1995 (age 31) Wetteren, Belgium
- Height: 1.83 m (6 ft 0 in)
- Weight: 70 kg (154 lb)

Cycling career
- Sport: Cycling
- Current team: Alpecin–Premier Tech
- Disciplines: Track; Road
- Role: Rider

Amateur teams
- 2010–2011: Immo Dejaegher–Lotto Menen
- 2012–2013: Avia Fuji Youth
- 2014: Van Der Vurst Development
- 2015–2016: EFC–Etixx

Professional teams
- 2017–2025: Sport Vlaanderen–Baloise
- 2026–: Alpecin–Premier Tech

Major wins
- Track World Championships Madison (2025) Omnium (2024)
Medal record
Men's track cycling
Representing Belgium
World Championships
Gold medal – first place	2024 Ballerup	Omnium
Gold medal – first place	2025 Santiago	Madison
Silver medal – second place	2024 Ballerup	Madison
Bronze medal – third place	2022 Saint-Quentin-en-Yvelines	Madison
Bronze medal – third place	2025 Santiago	Omnium
Bronze medal – third place	2026 Shanghai	Scratch
European Championships
Silver medal – second place	2021 Grenchen	Madison

Lindsay De Vylder (born 30 May 1995) is a Belgian cyclist, who currently rides for UCI WorldTeam Alpecin–Premier Tech. He represented Belgium at the 2020 (as a reserve) and 2024 Summer Olympics where he finished 7th in the men's team pursuit but a disappointing 10th in the men's madison at the side of Fabio Van den Bossche.

== Career ==
Without a single family member or fan to witness, De Vylder won his first international title when he became European junior champion in the Omnium at the 2013 European Track Championships (under-23 & junior) in Anadia, Portugal finishing with an equal points total as Italian rider Riccardo Minali but having posted better time trials.

The Sangalhos National Velodrome in Anadia, Portugal holds good memories for De Vylder as four years later, in 2017, he won his second European title, teaming up with Robbe Ghys to win the under-23 madison at the 2017 UEC European Track Championships (under-23 & junior) on said velodrome.

He won multiple medals at the senior level in the men's madison taking the silver and the bronze at the side of Fabio Van den Bossche at the 2024 UCI Track Cycling World Championships resp. 2022 UCI Track Cycling World Championships and another silver at the side of Kenny De Ketele at the 2021 UEC European Track Championships.

A couple months after the disappointment in the men's madison at the 2024 Summer Olympics in Paris, France, he became a track cycling world champion winning the gold medal in the men's omnium at the 2024 UCI Track Cycling World Championships in Ballerup, Denmark. A year later, at the 2025 UCI Track Cycling World Championships in Santiago, Chile, having already won a bronze medal in the men's omnium, he won his second world title, winning the gold medal in the men's madison with teammate Fabio Van Den Bossche.

== Personal life ==
De Vylder tried his hand at other sports like football and Judo before he turned to cycling. His parents, seeing this as an expensive sport, tried to discourage him but eventually gave in and bought him a second-hand bike when he was 11. De Vylder is married, with two children. He holds a degree of real estate surveyor from the HOGENT University of Applied Sciences and Arts in Ghent, Belgium.

== Major results ==
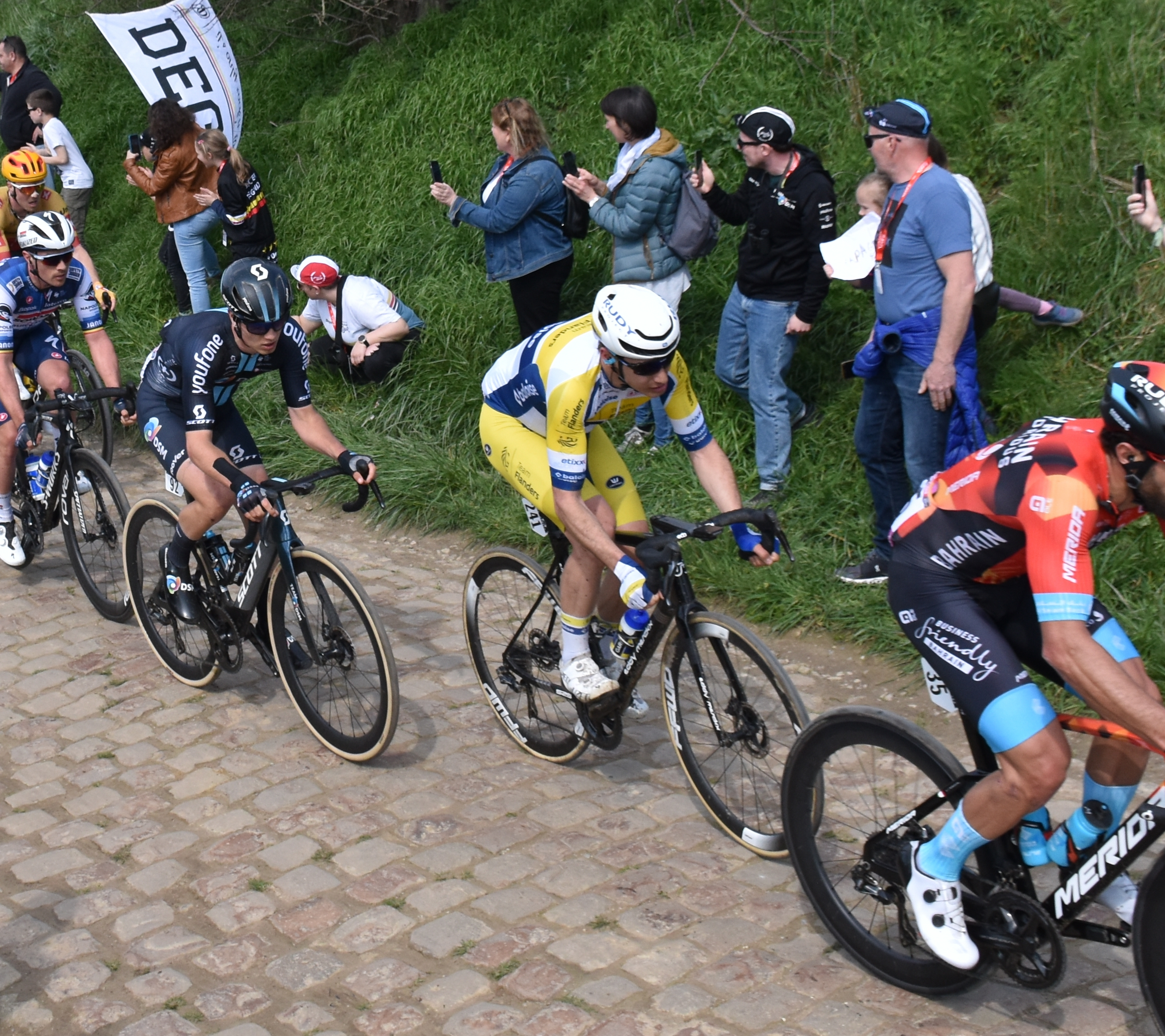
Paris-Roubaix 2023 - Secteur pavé de Quiévy à Saint-Python - N° 241 Linrsay de Vylder.

=== Track ===
2013
1st Omnium, UEC European Junior Championships
National Junior Championships

1st Individual pursuit
1st Points race
1st Scratch
1st Omnium
1st Kilo
1st Team pursuit
1st Team sprint

2014
3rd Scratch, National Championships
2017
UEC European Under-23 Championships

1st Madison (with Robbe Ghys)
2nd Team pursuit

2nd Omnium, UCI World Cup, Cali
National Championships

2nd Madison
2nd Omnium

2018
1st Madison, UCI World Cup, Milton (with Kenny De Ketele)
2019
National Championships

1st Madison (with Moreno De Pauw)
1st Scratch
1st Omnium

2nd Team pursuit, UCI World Cup, London
2021
2nd Madison, UEC European Championships (with Kenny De Ketele)
2022
1st Six Days of Ghent (with Robbe Ghys)
1st Six Days of Rotterdam (with Jules Hesters)
3rd Madison, UCI World Championships (with Fabio Van den Bossche)
2024
UCI World Championships

1st Omnium
2nd Madison (with Fabio Van den Bossche)

2nd Six Days of Ghent (with Robbe Ghys)
3rd Six Days of Bremen (with Nils Politt)
2025
UCI World Championships

1st Madison (with Fabio Van den Bossche)
3rd Omnium

1st Six Days of Ghent (with Fabio Van den Bossche)
2026
3rd Scratch, UCI World Championships

=== Road ===
2013
1st Mountains classification, Niedersachsen-Rundfahrt der Junioren
2016
1st Stage 2 Ronde van Oost-Vlaanderen
2018
9th Grote Prijs Jean-Pierre Monseré
2023
5th Cholet-Pays de la Loire
