= 2023 UCI Track Cycling World Championships – Men's points race =

Men's points race at the 2023 UCI Track Cycling World Championships
- Venue: Sir Chris Hoy Velodrome
- Location: Glasgow, United Kingdom
- Dates: 9 August
- Competitors: 24 from 24 nations
- Winning points: 123

Medalists
gold medal	Aaron Gate	New Zealand
silver medal	Albert Torres	Spain
bronze medal	Fabio Van den Bossche	Belgium

The Men's points race competition at the 2023 UCI Track Cycling World Championships was held on 9 August 2023.

== Results ==
The race was started at 19:15.

Rank	Name	Nation	Lap points	Sprint points	Total points
1st place, gold medalist(s)	Aaron Gate	New Zealand	80	43	123
2nd place, silver medalist(s)	Albert Torres	Spain	80	27	107
3rd place, bronze medalist(s)	Fabio Van den Bossche	Belgium	80	15	95
4	Roger Kluge	Germany	80	9	89
5	William Perrett	Great Britain	60	15	75
6	Mathias Guillemette	Canada	60	9	69
7	Naoki Kojima	Japan	60	3	63
8	Bertold Drijver	Hungary	60	0	60
9	Yoeri Havik	Netherlands	40	12	52
10	Michele Scartezzini	Italy	40	7	47
11	Donavan Grondin	France	20	21	41
12	Alon Yogev	Israel	20	5	25
13	Wojciech Pszczolarski	Poland	0	3	3
14	Gustav Johansson	Sweden	0	2	2
15	Adam Křenek	Czech Republic	0	1	1
16	Colby Lange	United States	0	0	0
18	Artyom Zakharov	Kazakhstan	–20	5	–15
19	Daniel Crista	Romania	–20	2	–18
20	Facundo Gabriel Lezica	Argentina	–20	0	–20
21	Mykyta Yakovlev	Ukraine	–20	0	–20
—	Lotfi Tchambaz	Algeria	Did not finish		
—	Simon Vitzthum	Switzerland	Did not finish		
—	Juan Esteban Arango	Colombia	Did not finish		
—	Joshua Duffy	Australia	Did not finish		
