= Rita Ralão Duarte =

Portuguese dressage rider (born 1993)

Personal information
- Born: 16 May 1993 (age 33) Lisbon, Portugal
- Height: 170 cm (5 ft 7 in)

Sport
- Country: Portugal
- Sport: Equestrian
- Event: Dressage

Achievements and titles
- Olympic finals: 2024 Olympic Games

Rita Ralão Duarte (born 16 May 1993) is a Portuguese dressage rider.

Ralão Duarte represented the Portuguese team at the 2024 Olympic Games in Paris.
