= Fabio Van den Bossche =

Belgian road and track cyclist (born 2000)

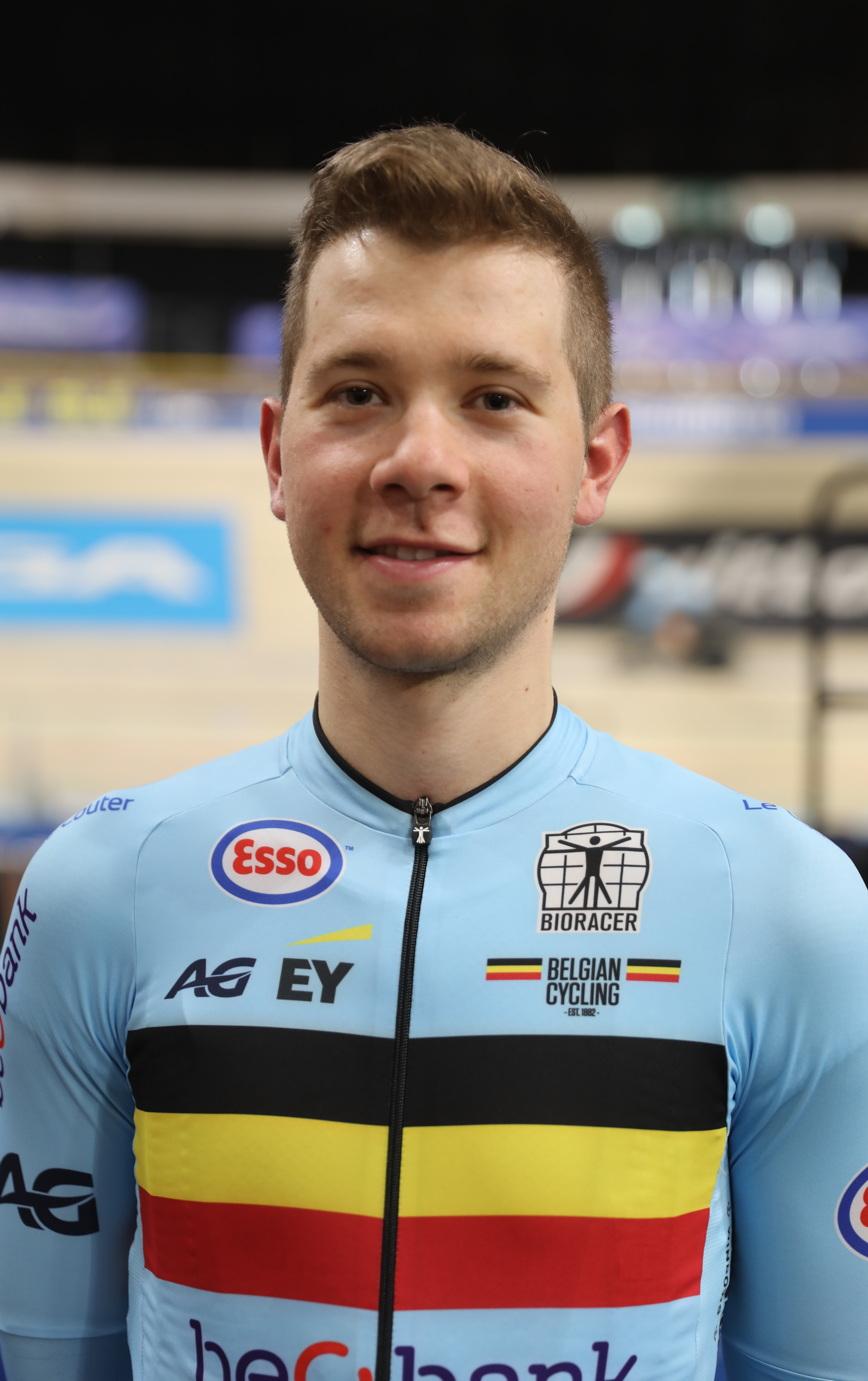
- Van den Bossche in 2024

Personal information
- Born: 21 September 2000 (age 26) Ghent, Belgium
- Height: 1.76 m (5 ft 9 in)
- Weight: 63 kg (139 lb)

Cycling career
- Sport: Cycling
- Current team: Soudal–Quick-Step
- Disciplines: Track; Road
- Role: Rider

Amateur teams
- 2016: John Saey
- 2017–2018: Davo–Tongeren
- 2019: EFC–L&R–Vulsteke

Professional teams
- 2019: Sport Vlaanderen–Baloise (stagiaire)
- 2020–2021: Sport Vlaanderen–Baloise
- 2022–2025: Alpecin–Fenix
- 2026–: Soudal–Quick-Step

Major wins
- Track World Championships Madison (2025)
Medal record
Men's track cycling
Representing Belgium
Olympic Games
Bronze medal – third place	2024 Paris	Omnium
World Championships
Gold medal – first place	2025 Santiago	Madison
Silver medal – second place	2024 Ballerup	Madison
Silver medal – second place	2026 Shanghai	Omnium
Bronze medal – third place	2022 Saint-Quentin-en-Yvelines	Points race
Bronze medal – third place	2022 Saint-Quentin-en-Yvelines	Madison
Bronze medal – third place	2023 Glasgow	Points race
European Championships
Silver medal – second place	2021 Grenchen	Omnium
Bronze medal – third place	2022 Munchen	Madison
Bronze medal – third place	2024 Apeldoorn	Omnium

Fabio Van den Bossche (born 21 September 2000) is a Belgian road and track cyclist, who rides for UCI WorldTeam Soudal–Quick-Step. He represented Belgium at the 2024 Summer Olympics in Paris, France finishing 7th in the men's team pursuit and winning the bronze medal in the men's omnium.

== Career ==
Van den Bossche enjoyed his start in track cycling at the Flemish Cycling Center Eddy Merckx in Ghent, Belgium and attended the Topsportschool in Ghent.

Known at the time as the Remco Evenepoel of track cycling, he is the only rider to have beaten Belgian great Remco Evenepoel in his jersey of junior world champion.

He is a multiple European track cycling junior champion, having won the men's madison (with Nicolas Wernimont) at the 2017 UEC European Track Championships (under-23 & junior) in Sangalhos, Portugal and the men's omnium and madison (with Nicolas Wernimont) at the 2018 UEC European Track Championships (under-23 & junior) in Aigle, Switzerland.

Having come close at the 2022 UCI Track Cycling World Championships (bronze) and 2024 UCI Track Cycling World Championships (silver), he finally won the gold medal in the men's madison together with teammate Lindsay De Vylder at the 2025 UCI Track Cycling World Championships in Santiago, Chile.

In August 2025, Van den Bossche signed with UCI WorldTeam Soudal–Quick-Step ahead of the 2026 season.

== Personal life ==
Van den Bossche was born in to a cycling family on the very day that Belgian cyclists Etienne De Wilde and Matthew Gilmore won a silver medal in the men's madison at the 2000 Summer Olympics in Sydney, Australia. He is the grandson of former professional cyclist Willy De Geest, a teammate of five years of the cycling great Roger De Vlaeminck. His father, Gunther, was a professional cyclist himself and later "soigneur" with UCI ProSeries team Team Flanders–Baloise.

He is married to Kate Wiggins, daughter of former track cycling coach Jonathan Wiggins.

== Major results ==
=== Road ===
2017
1st Overall Keizer der Juniores
1st Vlaams-Brabant Classic
2018
1st Overall Sint-Martinusprijs Kontich
2019
3rd GP Dr. Eugeen Roggeman
2026
3rd Road race, National Championships

==== Grand Tour general classification results timeline ====
Grand Tour	2024	2025
Giro d'Italia	107	100
Tour de France	—	—
Vuelta a España	—	—

Legend
—	Did not compete
DNF	Did not finish

=== Track ===
2017
UEC European Junior Championships

1st Madison (with Nicolas Wernimont)
2nd Points race

National Junior Championships

1st Madison (with Nicolas Wernimont)
1st Points race

2018
UEC European Junior Championships

1st Madison (with Nicolas Wernimont)
1st Omnium

National Track Championships

1st Derny
1st Points race
2nd Madison
2nd Scratch
2nd Omnium

2019
2nd Team pursuit, UEC European Under-23 Championships
2021
2nd Omnium, UEC European Championships
2022
UCI World Championships

3rd Madison (with Lindsay De Vylder)
3rd Points race

3rd Madison, UEC European Championships (with Robbe Ghys)
2023
3rd Points race, UCI World Championships
3rd Six Days of Ghent (with Jules Hesters)
2024
1st Six Days of Ghent (with Benjamin Thomas)
2nd Madison, UCI World Championships (with Lindsay De Vylder)
3rd Omnium, Olympic Games
2025
1st Madison, UCI World Championships (with Lindsay De Vylder)
1st Six Days of Ghent (with Lindsay De Vylder)
2025
2nd Omnium, UCI World Championships
