= Maria Tomé (triathlete) =

Portuguese triathlete (born 2001)

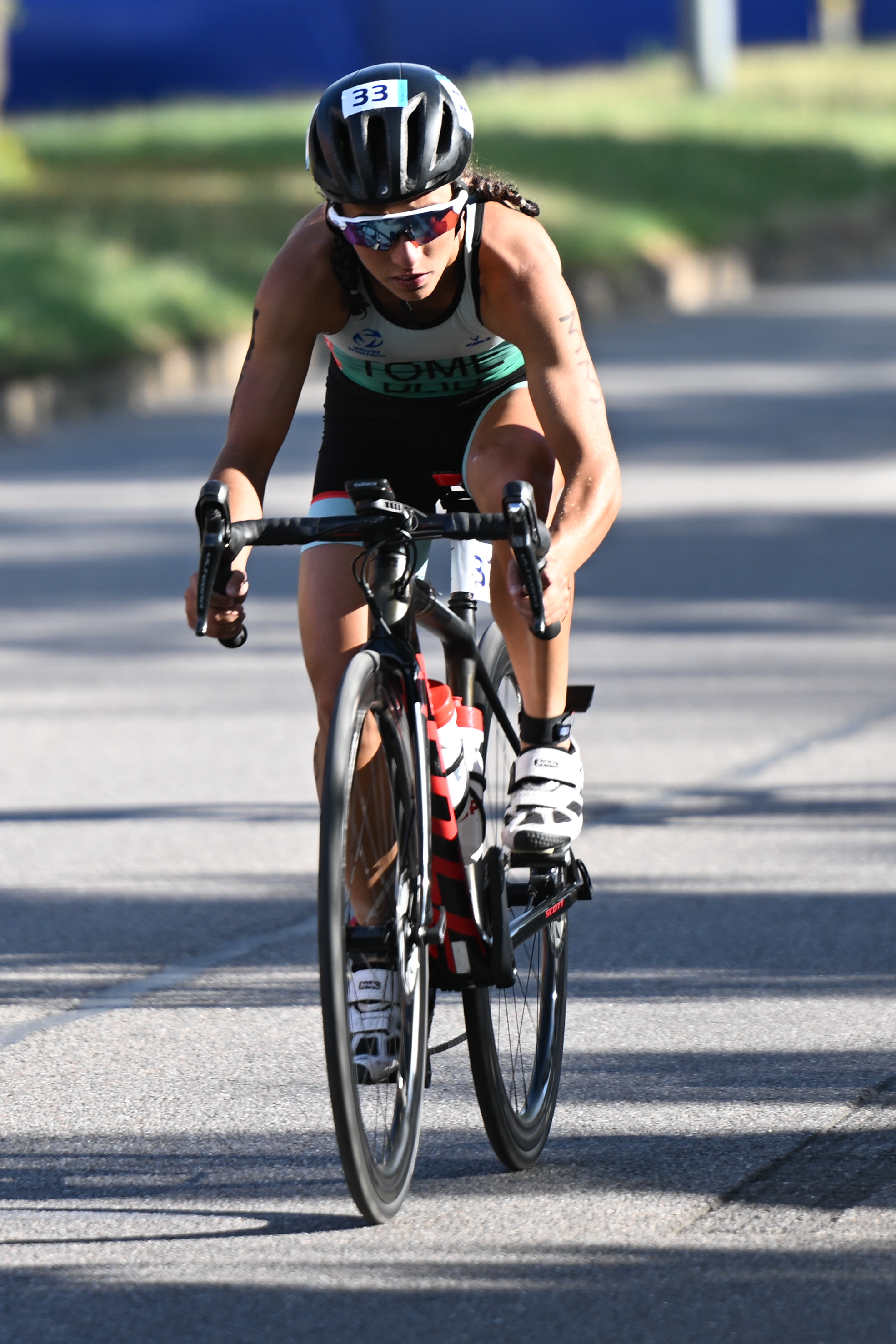
- Tomé in 2022

Personal information
- Nationality: Portuguese
- Born: 28 June 2001 (age 25) Lisbon, Portugal

Sport
- Sport: Triathlon
Medal record
Women's triathlon
Representing Portugal
World Championships
Bronze medal – third place	2024 Torremolinos	Under-23

Maria Tomé (born 28 June 2001) is a Portuguese triathlete. She competed at the 2024 Paris Olympics.

== Early life ==
She was encouraged to start swimming as a child on medical advise due to a diagnosed heart murmur. She made her international competitive debut in triathlon in 2018. She studied physiotherapy at the Escola Superior de Saúde de Alcoitão in Cascais.

== Career ==
A member of the Valence Triathlon team in France and the Torres Novas Swimming Club in Portugal, she won silver at the U23 World Triathlon Championships in 2023.

She was selected to compete at the 2024 Summer Olympics in Paris. She placed eleventh overall in the women's individual race. This came after she was in 39th position after the swimming segment of the race. In the cycling section she performed the fastest of all competitors, including the race winner. She was also part of the Portuguese team for the mixed relay race, in which they placed in fifth overall.
