= Aaron Gate =

New Zealand road cyclist (born 1990)

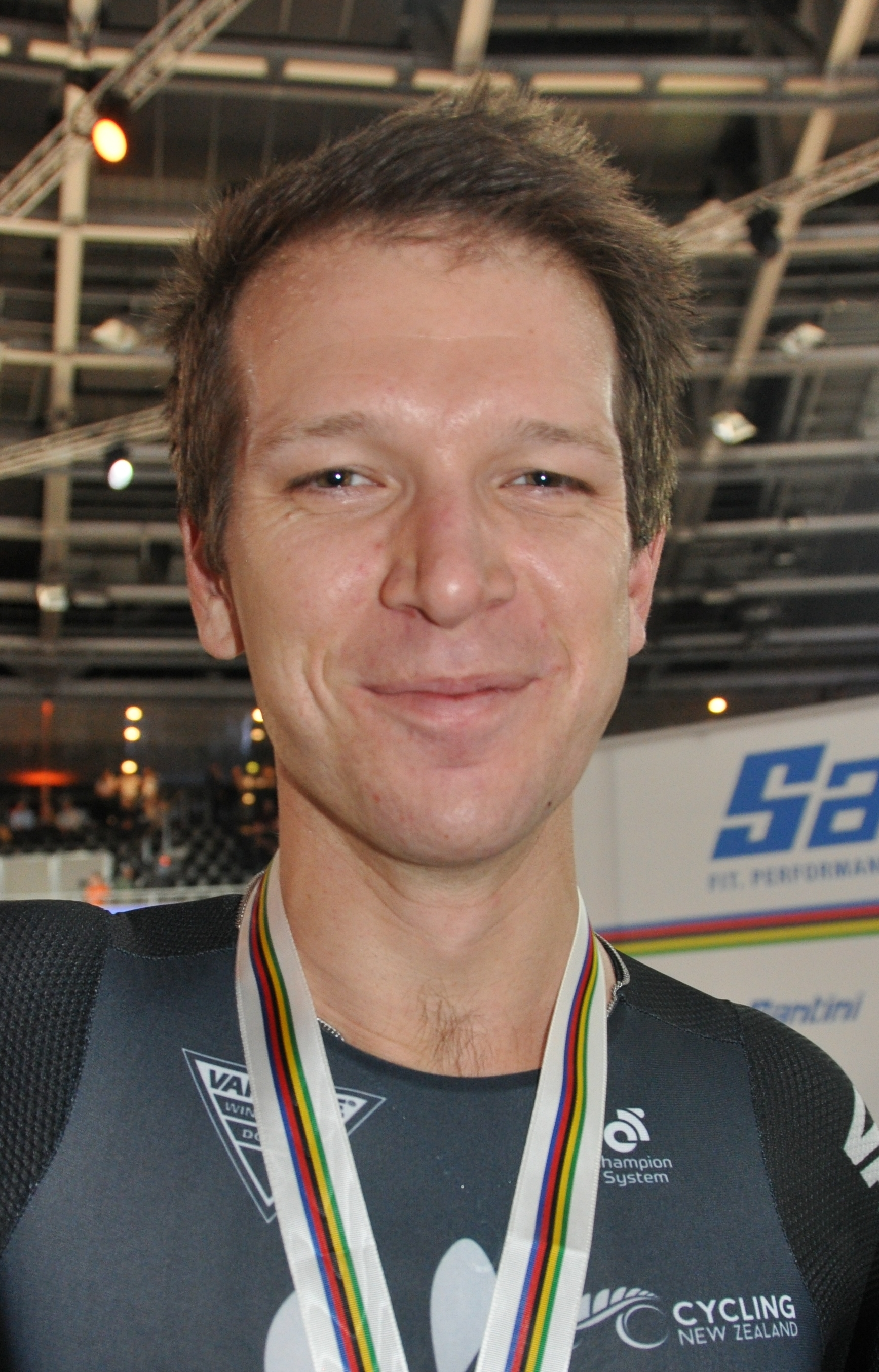
- Gate in 2020

Personal information
- Full name: Aaron Murray Gate
- Born: 26 November 1990 (age 35) Auckland, New Zealand
- Height: 1.80 m (5 ft 11 in)
- Weight: 71 kg (157 lb)

Cycling career
- Sport: Cycling
- Current team: XDS Astana Team
- Disciplines: Road; Track
- Role: Rider

Professional teams
- 2013–2016: An Post–Chain Reaction
- 2017–2018: Aqua Blue Sport
- 2019: EvoPro Racing
- 2020–2023: Black Spoke Pro Cycling Academy
- 2024: Burgos BH
- 2025–: XDS Astana Team

Major wins
- Road Stage races Tour of Hainan (2024) Boucles de la Mayenne (2025) One-day races and Classics National Road Race Championships (2024) National Time Trial Championships (2021, 2023) Track World Championships Omnium (2013) Points race (2023)
Medal record
Representing New Zealand
Men's track cycling
Olympic Games
Bronze medal – third place	2012 London	Team pursuit
World Championships
Gold medal – first place	2013 Minsk	Omnium
Gold medal – first place	2023 Glasgow	Points race
Silver medal – second place	2017 Hong Kong	Omnium
Silver medal – second place	2020 Berlin	Madison
Silver medal – second place	2020 Berlin	Team pursuit
Silver medal – second place	2021 Roubaix	Omnium
Bronze medal – third place	2012 Melbourne	Team pursuit
Bronze medal – third place	2014 Cali	Team Pursuit
Bronze medal – third place	2022 Saint-Quentin-en-Yvelines	Omnium
Bronze medal – third place	2023 Glasgow	Madison
Bronze medal – third place	2023 Glasgow	Team pursuit
Commonwealth Games
Gold medal – first place	2022 Birmingham	Individual pursuit
Gold medal – first place	2022 Birmingham	Points race
Gold medal – first place	2022 Birmingham	Team pursuit
Bronze medal – third place	2014 Glasgow	Points race
Men's road bicycle racing
Commonwealth Games
Gold medal – first place	2022 Birmingham	Road race

Aaron Murray Gate (born 26 November 1990) is a New Zealand road and track cyclist, who currently rides for UCI WorldTeam XDS Astana Team. He represented his country in track cycling at the 2012, 2016 and 2020 Summer Olympics. Gate is the first New Zealand athlete to win four gold medals at a single Commonwealth Games.

== Career ==
He won a bronze medal at the 2012 Summer Olympics in the team pursuit event with teammates Sam Bewley, Marc Ryan, Jesse Sergent and Westley Gough. On 24 February 2013 in Belarus, Gate won the world championship title in the omnium event. Alongside Pieter Bulling, Regan Gough, and Dylan Kennett, he came fourth in the men's team pursuit at the 2016 Rio Olympics, being beaten by Denmark to the bronze medal. He was named in the startlist for the 2017 Vuelta a España. In 2021 he won his first national title winning the New Zealand National Time Trial Championships by 0.7 seconds ahead of George Bennett.

At the 2020 Summer Olympics, Gate competed in the team pursuit event with teammates Regan Gough, Jordan Kerby and Campbell Stewart. In the bronze medal race against Australia, he crashed after clipping Kerby's rear wheel, fracturing his collarbone. He subsequently withdrew from the rest of the Games, and was replaced by Stewart in the madison and omnium events.

In 2022, at the age of 31, Gate became a quadruple Commonwealth champion when taking gold in the individual pursuit, team pursuit and points race on the track as well as the road race at the 2022 Commonwealth Games in Birmingham.

== Major results ==
=== Road ===
2011
1st Stage 4 Tour of the Murray River
6th Overall Rás Tailteann
10th Rund um den Finanzplatz Eschborn-Frankfurt U23
2012
7th Overall Tour of Wellington

1st Stage 5

2013
10th Halle–Ingooigem
2015
4th Rutland–Melton CiCLE Classic
5th Overall Rás Tailteann

1st Sprints classification
1st Stages 2 & 5

6th Overall Ronde de l'Oise
6th Ronde van Overijssel
2016
1st Overall Tour of Southland

1st Stage 5

1st Lake Taupo Cycle Challenge
6th Grote Prijs Jean-Pierre Monseré
6th Overall Rás Tailteann

1st Points classification
1st Stage 6

2018
1st Mountains classification, Tour of Austria
2019 (1 pro win)
1st Overall New Zealand Cycle Classic

1st Stage 1

1st Stage 1 Belgrade–Banja Luka
5th Overall Circuit des Ardennes
9th Antwerp Port Epic
2020
1st Overall Tour of Southland

1st Stage 1 (TTT), 6 & 7

2nd Overall New Zealand Cycle Classic

1st Stage 1

4th Road race, National Championships
2021 (1)
1st Time trial, National Championships
1st Gravel and Tar Classic
3rd Overall New Zealand Cycle Classic
4th Chrono des Nations
10th Lillehammer GP
2022 (4)
Commonwealth Games

1st Road race
4th Time trial

1st Time trial, Oceania Championships
1st Overall International Tour of Hellas

1st Stage 1

4th Overall Ronde de l'Oise
9th Overall Tour de Luxembourg

1st Stage 3

10th Overall Tour of Belgium
10th Polynormande
2023 (2)
1st Time trial, National Championships
2nd Overall International Tour of Hellas

1st Prologue

2024 (5)
Oceania Championships

1st Time trial
3rd Road race

National Championships

1st Road race
2nd Time trial

1st Overall Tour of Hainan

1st Points classification
1st Stages 3 & 4

1st Overall New Zealand Cycle Classic

1st Stages 1, 3, 4 & 5

1st Overall Trans-Himalaya Cycling Race
4th Overall Tour de Taiwan
6th Gravel and Tar Classic
2025 (4)
1st Overall Boucles de la Mayenne

1st Stage 2

1st Stage 8 Tour de Langkawi
2nd Time trial, National Championships
2nd Cadel Evans Great Ocean Road Race
3rd Overall Tour of Hainan

1st Stage 4

6th Grand Prix Criquielion
10th Surf Coast Classic
2026
10th Cadel Evans Great Ocean Road Race

==== Grand Tour general classification results timeline ====
Grand Tour	2017
Giro d'Italia	—
Tour de France	—
Vuelta a España	140

Legend
—	Did not compete
DNF	Did not finish

=== Track ===
2008
3rd Team pursuit, UCI World Junior Championships
2009
Oceania Championships

2nd Team pursuit
3rd Madison (with Myron Simpson)

3rd Team pursuit, UCI World Cup, Pekin
2010
Oceania Championships

2nd Madison (with Myron Simpson)
2nd Team pursuit
3rd Omnium

UCI World Cup

2nd Madison, Melbourne (with Myron Simpson)
2nd Team pursuit, Manchester

2011
Oceania Championships

1st Team pursuit
2nd Points race

UCI World Cup

1st Team pursuit, Cali
3rd Team pursuit, London

2012
1st Scratch, National Championships
3rd Team pursuit, Olympic Games
3rd Team pursuit, UCI World Championships
2013
1st Omnium, UCI World Championships
Oceania Championships

1st Team pursuit
2nd Omnium
3rd Madison (with Marc Ryan)

National Championships

1st Points race
1st Scratch
1st Individual pursuit
1st Madison (with Myron Simpson)

3rd Omnium, UCI World Cup, Manchester
2014
Oceania Championships

1st Points race
2nd Team pursuit
3rd Omnium

3rd Team pursuit, UCI World Championships
3rd Points race, Commonwealth Games
2015
Oceania Championships

1st Points race
1st Team pursuit
2nd Omnium

1st Omnium, National Championships
2016
Oceania Championships

1st Omnium
2nd Points race

1st Points race, National Championships
2017
2nd Omnium, UCI World Championships
2018
1st Madison, UCI World Cup, Cambridge (with Campbell Stewart)
2019
UCI World Cup

1st Omnium, Brisbane
1st Madison, Cambridge (with Campbell Stewart)
2nd Madison, Brisbane (with Tom Sexton)
3rd Team pursuit, Cambridge

2020
National Championships

1st Omnium
1st Individual pursuit
1st Madison (with Campbell Stewart)

UCI World Championships

2nd Madison (with Campbell Stewart)
2nd Team pursuit

2021
National Championships

1st Points race
1st Individual pursuit

2nd Omnium, UCI World Championships
UCI Champions League

2nd Elimination, Panevėžys
2nd Elimination, London

2022
Commonwealth Games

1st Team pursuit
1st Individual pursuit
1st Points race

Oceania Championships

1st Individual pursuit
1st Points race
1st Scratch
1st Omnium
2nd Madison (with Tom Sexton)

3rd Omnium, UCI World Championships
2023
UCI World Championships

1st Points race
3rd Madison (with Campbell Stewart)
3rd Team pursuit

2024
3rd Six Days of Ghent (with Jules Hesters)

Awards
Preceded by Nico Porteous	New Zealand's Sportsman of the Year; 2023	Succeeded by Hamish Kerr
Olympic Games
Preceded by Sarah Hirini & David Nyika	Flagbearer for New Zealand; Paris 2024; With: Jo Aleh	Incumbent
