= Ricardo Peña (cyclist) =

Mexican cyclist (born 2001)

Personal information
- Full name: Ricardo Peña Salas
- Born: 30 June 2001 (age 25)

Cycling career
- Sport: Cycling
- Current team: Crisa–SEEI
- Disciplines: Track; Road
- Role: Rider

Amateur teams
- 2019–2021: Baja California Sur
- 2021: ABC Zapatitos
- 2022–: Crisa–SEEI
Medal record
Men's track cycling
Representing Mexico
Pan American Games
Gold medal – first place	2023 Santiago	Madison
Silver medal – second place	2023 Santiago	Omnium
Pan American Championships
Gold medal – first place	2021 Lima	Omnium
Silver medal – second place	2021 Lima	Team pursuit
Silver medal – second place	2022 Lima	Omnium
Silver medal – second place	2022 Lima	Madison
Bronze medal – third place	2022 Lima	Team pursuit
Bronze medal – third place	2023 San Juan	Madison
Bronze medal – third place	2024 Carson	Omnium
Bronze medal – third place	2026 Santiago	Omnium
Central American and Caribbean Games
Gold medal – first place	2023 San Salvador	Omnium
Gold medal – first place	2026 Santo Domingo	Omnium
Gold medal – first place	2026 Santo Domingo	Madison
Silver medal – second place	2026 Santo Domingo	Team pursuit
Junior Pan American Games
Silver medal – second place	2021 Cali-Valle	Omnium
Silver medal – second place	2021 Cali-Valle	Team pursuit

Ricardo Peña Salas (Note: In this Spanish name, the first or paternal surname is Peña and the second or maternal family name is Salas.) (born 30 June 2001) is a Mexican track and road cyclist, who currently rides for club team Crisa–SEEI. He competed in the omnium at the 2024 Summer Olympics, placing 21st overall.

== Major results ==
=== Track ===
2020
2nd Team pursuit, National Championships
2021
National Championships

1st Omnium
2nd Team pursuit

Pan American Championships

1st Omnium
2nd Team pursuit

UCI Nations Cup

3rd Team pursuit, Cali

2022
Pan American Championships

2nd Omnium
3rd Madison (with Fernando Nava)
3rd Team pursuit

UCI Nations Cup

2nd Madison, Cali

2023
Pan American Games

1st Madison (with Fernando Nava)
3rd Omnium

3rd Madison (with Fernando Nava), Pan American Championships
2024
3rd Omnium, Pan American Championships

2026
Central American and Caribbean Games

1st Omnium
1st Madison
2nd Team pursuit

=== Road ===
2018
2nd Road race, Pan American Junior Championships
2019
1st Road race, National Junior Championships
2nd Road race, Pan American Junior Championships
2021
3rd Road race, Pan American Under-23 Championships
