= Akil Campbell =

Trinidad and Tobago cyclist

Personal information
- Born: 1 February 1996 (age 30) San Fernando, Trinidad and Tobago

Cycling career
- Sport: Cycling
- Disciplines: Road; Track
- Role: Rider

Amateur teams
- 2015: Rigtech Sonics CC
- 2018: Heatware
- 2019: PSL
- 2022: PSL Cycling Club
Medal record
Men's track cycling
Representing Trinidad and Tobago
Pan American Championships
Gold medal – first place	2021 Lima	Scratch race
Bronze medal – third place	2022 Lima	Scratch race
Bronze medal – third place	2023 San Juan	Omnium
Bronze medal – third place	2024 Carson	Scratch
Bronze medal – third place	2026 Santiago	Scratch race
Bronze medal – third place	2026 Santiago	Elimination

Akil Campbell (born 1 February 1996) is a Trinidadian road and track cyclist. His sister Teniel Campbell is also a professional cyclist.

== Major results ==
=== Track ===
2015
National Championships

1st Scratch
1st Points race
1st Team pursuit

2017
National Championships

1st Omnium
1st Points race

2018
3rd Omnium, Central American and Caribbean Games
2019
National Championships

1st Scratch
1st Omnium
1st Individual pursuit

2021
1st Overall Elimination, UCI Nations Cup

1st Elimination, Cali

2022
1st Elimination, Cali, UCI Nations Cup
National Championships

1st Scratch
1st Points race
1st Individual pursuit

2023
3rd Omnium, Pan American Championships

=== Road ===
2014
1st Time trial, National Junior Championships
2015
1st Time trial, National Championships
2016
National Championships

1st Time trial
2nd Road race

2019
National Championships

2nd Road race
2nd Time trial

2023
National Championships

1st Time trial
4th Road race
